= Wise (surname) =

Wise is a surname. Notable people with the surname include:

- Alfie Wise (1942–2025), American actor
- Anna Wise (born 1991), American singer
- Audrey Wise (1935–2000), United Kingdom politician
- Bernhard Wise (1858–1916), Australian politician
- Bob Wise (born 1948), American politician
- Brownie Wise (1913–1992), American saleswoman who developed "party plan" marketing
- Charla Wise, American aerospace executive
- Christopher Wise (born 1961), American author
- Cody Wise (born 1995), American singer
- Daniel Wise (disambiguation), several people, including
  - Daniel Wise (American football) (born 1996), American football player
  - Daniel Wise (author) (1813–1898), Methodist Episcopal clerical author
  - Daniel Wise (playwright), American contemporary playwright, producer, and author
  - Daniel Wise (mathematician) (born 1971), American mathematician
- David Wise (disambiguation), several people, including
  - David Wise (composer), British video game music composer
  - David Wise (cricketer) (born 1963), English cricketer
  - David Wise (freestyle skier) (born 1990), American Olympic gold medalist
  - David Wise (journalist) (1930–2018), American investigative journalist and writer
  - David Wise (writer) (1955–2020), American television writer
- Deatrich Wise (born 1965), American football player
- Deatrich Wise Jr. (born 1994), American football player
- Dennis Wise (born 1966), English footballer
- DeWayne Wise (born 1978), American baseball player
- Doc Wise (born 1967), American football player
- Dwight Wise (1930–2020), American politician.
- Ernie Wise (1925–1999), British comedian
- Frank Wise (1897–1986), Australian politician
- Frank Wise (British politician) (1885–1933), British politician and economist
- Frank C. Wise (1864–1956), American politician from Ohio
- Fred Wise (disambiguation), several people
  - Fred Wise (physician) (1881–1950), American dermatologist
  - Fred Wise (songwriter) (1915–1966), American lyricist who wrote songs for Elvis Presley
- Frederick Wise, 1st Baron Wise (1887–1968), British Labour Party politician
- Fredric Wise (1871–1928), British Conservative Party politician
- George Wise (disambiguation), several people, including
  - George Wise (Australian politician) (1853–1950), Australian politician and solicitor
  - George Wise (rugby union) (1904–1971), New Zealand rugby union player
  - George D. Wise (Union) (1816–1881), Union Army officer during the American Civil War
  - George D. Wise (politician) (1831–1898), U.S. Representative from Virginia
  - George S. Wise (1906–1987), American Jewish sociologist
- Glenn Wise American politician
- Greg Wise (born 1966) English actor and producer
- Henry Wise (disambiguation), several people, including
  - Henry Wise (footballer) (born 2000), English professional footballer
  - Henry Wise (gardener) (1653–1738), English gardener, designer, and nurseryman
  - Henry Wise (merchant) (1802–1866), English mariner and merchant
  - Henry Wise (publisher) (1835–1922), New Zealand publisher
  - Henry A. Wise (1806–1876), Governor of Virginia
  - Henry Wise Jr. (1920–2003), American physician and World War II Tuskegee Airman fighter pilot
  - Henry A. Wise (New York state senator) (1906–1982), New York politician
  - Henry Augustus Wise (1819–1869), author and U.S. Naval Officer
  - Henry Seiler Wise (1909–1982), United States federal judge
  - Henry Christopher Wise (politician) (1806–1883), English politician
- Herbert Wise (1924–2015), Austrian-born film and television producer and director.
- Isaac Mayer Wise (1819–1900), American Reform rabbi and author
- Jake Wise (born 2000), American professional ice-hockey player
- James H. Wise (politician) (1912–1976), American politician
- John Wise (disambiguation), several people, including:
  - John Wise (Australian politician) (1856–1942), New South Wales politician
  - John Wise (balloonist) (1808–1879), American ballooning pioneer
  - John Wise (Canadian politician) (1935–2013)
  - John Wise (clergyman) (1652–1725), Massachusetts divine who protested taxation
  - John Wise (footballer) (born 1954), Australian footballer
  - John Wise (Canadian politician) (1935–2013), Progressive Conservative MP and federal Minister of Agriculture
  - John Wise (sport shooter) (1901–1971), Australian, competed at the 1948 Olympic Games
  - John Wise (Virginia politician) (fl. 1768–1812), Speaker of Virginia House of Delegates
  - John A. Wise (1939–2011), American scientist
  - John Ayshford Wise (1810–1865), British MP for Stafford
  - John Henry Wise (1868–1937), Hawaiian politician
  - John Richard de Capel Wise (1831–1890), British writer
  - John Sergeant Wise (1846–1913), American Congressman
- Josh Wise (born 1983), NASCAR driver
- Korey Wise (born 1972), American activist
- Kurt Wise, American creationist
- Leo Wise (1849–1933), American newspaper editor and publisher
- Louise Waterman Wise (1874–1974), American social worker and artist
- Mark B. Wise (1953–2026), physicist
- Matt Wise (born 1975), baseball player
- Max Wise (born 1975), American former FBI agent, serving as a member of the Kentucky Senate
- Michael Wise (disambiguation), several people, including
  - Michael John Wise (1918–2015), British geographer
  - Mike Wise (American football) (1964–1992), American football defensive end
  - Mike Wise (American columnist), sports and feature writer for The Washington Post
  - Mike Wise (politician), member of the Ohio House of Representatives
- Rev. Percy W. Wise "Canon Wise" (1870–1950), Anglican priest in South Australia
- Ray Wise (born 1947), American actor
- Richard Alsop Wise (1843–1900), US politician of political family
- Rick Wise (born 1945), American baseball player
- Robert Wise (disambiguation), several people, including
  - Robert Wise (1914–2005), American film producer and director
  - Bob Wise (born 1948), U.S. governor of West Virginia
  - Robert Russell "Chubby" Wise (1915–1996), American bluegrass fiddler
  - Robert C. Wise (1925–2024), American politician in Pennsylvania
  - Robert Wise, chairman and managing director of the Wise Music Group (formerly Music Sales Group), sheet music publishers
  - Robert E. Wise, American architect, founder of the Cramer, Bartlett & Wise firm in Los Angeles in the early 1900s
- Ron Wise, Australian businessman and entrepreneur
- Seelig Wise (1913–2004), American farmer and politician
- Stephen Wise (disambiguation), several people, including
  - Stephen Samuel Wise (1874–1949), American rabbi and Zionist leader
  - Stephen Wise (politician) (born 1941), member of the Florida Senate
- Steven M. Wise (born 1952), American legal scholar
- Sue Wise (born 1953), English feminist author
- Tim Wise, American anti-racist activist
- Thomas Wise (disambiguation), several people
  - Sir Thomas Wise (died 1630) (died 1629), English politician, MP for Bere Alston, 1621
  - Thomas James Wise (1859–1937), manuscript forger
  - Thomas Wise (died 1641) (c. 1605 – 1641), English politician
  - Thomas Wise (priest) (1671–1726), clergyman of the Church of England
  - Thomas A. Wise (1865–1928), American actor and president of The Lambs
  - Thomas Dewey Wise (born 1939), American politician in the state of South Carolina
  - Tom Wise (born 1948), Independent and UKIP member of the European Parliament
- Wes Wise (1928–2022), American journalist and politician
- Willie Wise, American basketballer born 1947
- William Wise (disambiguation), several people, including
  - William Furlong Wise, British Naval officer
  - William Wise III, American basketballer born 1992
- Willy Wise, American boxer

== See also ==
- Wise (disambiguation)
