= John Wise =

John Wise may refer to:

- John Wise (clergyman) (1652–1725), Massachusetts divine who protested taxation
- John Wise (Virginia politician) (fl. 1768–1812), speaker of Virginia House of Delegates
- John Wise (balloonist) (1808–1879), American ballooning pioneer
- John Ayshford Wise (1810–1865), British MP for Stafford
- John Richard de Capel Wise (1831–1890), British writer
- John Sergeant Wise (1846–1913), U.S. congressman (Readjuster Party) from Virginia
- John Wise (Australian politician) (1856–1942), New South Wales politician
- John Henry Wise (1868–1937), Hawaiian politician
- John Humphrey Wise (1890–1984), British colonial administrator
- John Wise (Canadian politician) (1935–2013), former Progressive Conservative MP and federal Minister of Agriculture
- John Wise (sport shooter) (1901–1971), Australian, competed at the 1948 Olympic Games
- John Wise (footballer) (born 1954), Australian footballer
- John A. Wise (1939–2011), American scientist
