= Thomas Wise =

Thomas Wise or Tom Wise may refer to:

- Sir Thomas Wise (died 1630) (died 1629), English politician, MP for Bere Alston, 1621
- Thomas James Wise (1859–1937), manuscript forger
- Thomas Wise (died 1641) (c. 1605–1641), English politician
- Thomas Wise (priest) (1671–1726), clergyman of the Church of England
- Thomas A. Wise (1865–1928), American actor and president of The Lambs
- Thomas Dewey Wise (born 1939), American politician in the state of South Carolina
- Thomas Alexander Wise (1802–1889), Scottish physician, medical author, polymath and collector
- Tom Wise (politician) (born 1948), Independent and UKIP member of the European Parliament

== See also ==
- Thomas Wyse (1791–1862), Irish politician
