= Jesse S. Miller (politician) =

American politician and lawyer (1865–1935)

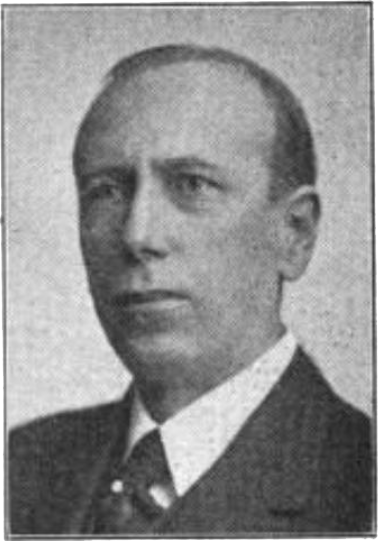
- Miller in 1920 publication

Member of the Ohio House of Representatives from the Stark County district
- In office 1917–1920 Serving with Frank C. Wise and Harvey S. Cable
- Preceded by: Adam W. Oberlin and Walter G. Agler

Personal details
- Born: Jesse Sproat Miller; January 23, 1865 North Benton, Mahoning County, Ohio, U.S.
- Died: June 14, 1935 (aged 70) Cleveland, Ohio, U.S.
- Party: Republican
- Spouse: Olive Gertrude Ruff (m. 1895)
- Children: 4
- Education: Mount Union College (BA); Wooster University (PhM)
- Occupation: Politician; lawyer; educator

Jesse Sproat Miller (January 23, 1865 – June 14, 1935) was an American politician and lawyer from Ohio. He served as a member of the Ohio House of Representatives, representing Stark County from 1917 to 1920.

== Early life ==
Jesse Sproat Miller was born on January 23, 1865, in North Benton, Mahoning County, Ohio, to Isabella Tate (née Sproat) and Jacob Filson Miller. His father served as a lieutenant in a Pennsylvania regiment during the Civil War. His grandfather Robert W. Miller was a colonel in the same regiment. His father worked as a blacksmith in North Benton. His mother's parents were Scottish immigrants that moved to Mahoning County. Miller was educated in public schools. He graduated from Mount Union College with a Bachelor of Arts and graduated from Wooster University with a Master of Philosophy. He studied law under Asa W. Jones and W. S. Anderson in Youngstown. He was admitted to the bar in 1899.

== Career ==
Before 1899, Miller was principal of public schools in different areas of Ohio, including Hanover, Seville, Shreve and Middletown. Miller worked as a lawyer in Alliance. He worked as a solicitor in Alliance from 1902 to 1906.

Miller was a Republican. He was a member of the Ohio House of Representatives, representing Stark County from 1917 to 1920. He wrote legislation that established the municipal court in Alliance. He served on the enrollment, insurance, and public buildings and lands committees.

== Personal life ==
Miller married Olive Gertrude Ruff of Shreve in 1895. They had four children, Jessie Majel, Harold Maynard, Ruth Viola and Eugene Curtis. He lived in Alliance.

Miller died on June 14, 1935, at a hospital in Cleveland.
