= Harvey S. Cable =

American politician (1861–1924)

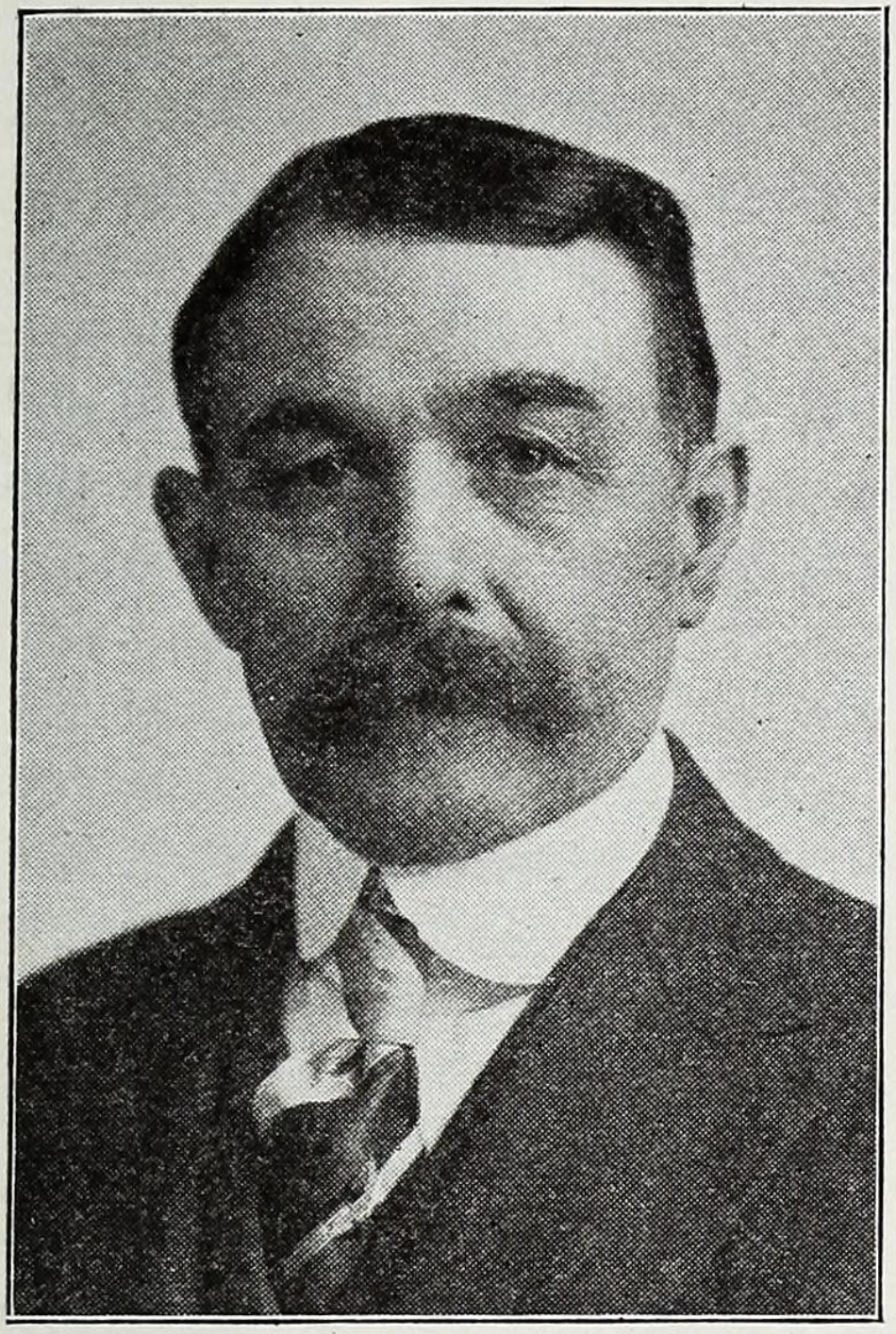
- Cable in 1918 publication

Member of the Ohio House of Representatives from the Stark County district
- In office 1917–1920 Serving with Frank C. Wise and Jesse S. Miller
- Preceded by: Adam W. Oberlin and Walter G. Agler

Personal details
- Born: January 3, 1861 Sandyville, Ohio, U.S.
- Died: September 12, 1924 (aged 63) Canton, Ohio, U.S.
- Resting place: Canton, Ohio, U.S.
- Party: Republican
- Spouse: Minnie M. Fox (m. 1889)
- Children: 1
- Education: Scio College
- Occupation: Politician; piano dealer; real estate businessman; educator

Harvey S. Cable (January 3, 1861 – September 12, 1924) was an American politician from Ohio. He served as a member of the Ohio House of Representatives, representing Stark County from 1917 to 1920.

== Early life ==
Harvey S. Cable was born on January 3, 1861, in Sandyville, Ohio, to Silas Cable. He was educated in public schools, the East Sparta normal school and one year at Scio College.

== Career ==
At the age of 20, Cable received a teacher's certificate and began teaching in Stark County. After attending school, Cable taught at rural schools and then taught at schools in Canton for three years. He also worked as a clerk at the Canton Water Works office for one term. Cable worked as a piano dealer and also in real estate.

Cable was a Republican. He was a member of the Ohio House of Representatives, representing Stark County from 1917 to 1920. He served as chairman of the public buildings and lands committee. He wrote a law to regulate the headlights and speed of automobiles.

== Personal life ==
Cable married Minnie M. Fox of Nevada, Ohio, on March 9, 1889. They had one son, Clyde H. Around 1894, Cable moved from Sandyville to Canton. He had a home at 6th Street and Smith Street in Canton, and later a home at Shorb Avenue and Cleveland Avenue. He was a member of Trinity Lutheran Church in Canton.

Cable died following a stroke on September 12, 1924, at Aultman Hospital in Canton. He was buried in Canton.
