= George Wise =

George Wise may refer to:

- George Wise (Australian politician) (1853–1950), Australian politician and solicitor
- George Wise (rugby union) (1904–1971), New Zealand rugby union player
- George D. Wise (general) (1816–1881), Union Army officer during the American Civil War
- George D. Wise (politician) (1831–1898), U.S. Representative from Virginia
- George S. Wise (1906–1987), American Jewish sociologist
