= Peter Collins =

Peter or Pete Collins may refer to:

== People ==
- Peter Collins (academic) (born 1945), British academic
- Peter Collins (New South Wales politician) (born 1947), Leader of the Opposition of New South Wales, 1995–1998
- Peter Collins (Victorian politician) (born 1941), member of the Victorian Legislative Assembly
- Peter Collins (broadcaster) (born 1964), Irish sportscaster
- Peter Collins (bishop) (born 1958), Roman Catholic Bishop of East Anglia
- Peter Collins (footballer) (born 1948), English footballer
- Peter Collins (organ builder) (1941–2015), English pipe organ builder
- Peter Collins (racing driver) (1931–1958), English racing driver
- Peter Collins (record producer) (1951–2024), English record producer
- Peter Collins (speedway rider) (born 1954), English former speedway rider
- Peter Collins (racing team manager) (born 1950), former racing team manager for the Lotus and Benetton Formula One teams
- Peter B. Collins (born 1953), American broadcaster
- Peter J. Collins (1859–1913), American politician from Ohio

== Other uses ==
- Pete Collins, fictional character in British soap opera, Emmerdale
- Pete Collins, fictional character in Australian soap opera Neighbours
- Peter Collins (slang), designating a nonexistent person to whom a newcomer was sent on an errand as a kind of initiation

== See also ==
- Peter K. Cullins (1928–2012), American admiral
