= Senator Wise =

Senator Wise may refer to:

- Bob Wise (born 1948), West Virginia State Senate
- Frank C. Wise (1864–1956), Ohio State Senate
- Henry A. Wise (New York state senator) (1906–1982), New York State Senate
- Jacob M. Wise (fl. 1820s), Pennsylvania State Senate
- J. J. Wise (1867–1930), Ohio State Senate
- Max Wise (born 1975), Kentucky State Senate
- Seelig Wise (1913–2004), Mississippi State Senate
- Stephen Wise (politician) (born 1941), Florida State Senate
- Thomas Dewey Wise (born 1939), South Carolina State Senate
