= USAI (disambiguation) =

USAI may refer to:

- Ukraine Security Assistance Initiative, a U.S. Department of Defense-led funding program to increase Ukraine's defense capabilities,
- United Sciences of America, a defunct multi-level marketing company, or
- USA Interactive, the name used by IAC from May 2002 to June 2003.
