= Peter J. Collins =

American politician (1859–1913)

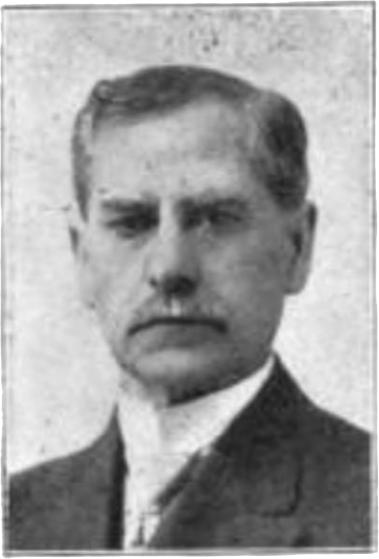
- Collins in 1912 publication

Member of the Ohio House of Representatives from the Stark County district
- In office 1913 – October 31, 1913 Serving with Walter G. Agler
- Preceded by: Milo W. Cathon, Owen J. Evans, Bernard Bell
- Succeeded by: Adam W. Oberlin

Personal details
- Born: October 1, 1859 Columbiana County, Ohio, U.S.
- Died: October 31, 1913 (aged 54) Canton, Ohio, U.S.
- Party: Democratic
- Spouse: Mary C. Mellen (m. 1888)
- Education: Mount Union College; Washington & Jefferson College
- Occupation: Politician; lawyer

Peter J. Collins (October 1, 1859 – October 31, 1913) was an American politician and lawyer from Ohio. He served as a member of the Ohio House of Representatives, representing Stark County from 1913 to his death.

== Early life ==
Peter J. Collins was born on October 1, 1859, in Columbiana County, Ohio, to William Collins. His father was an immigrant from County Donegal, Ireland. Collins studied at public schools in Columbiana County. He studied at Mount Union College and the Washington & Jefferson College. He was admitted to the bar on June 7, 1887.

== Career ==
Collins started practicing law in Canton. He was elected as city solicitor of Canton in 1893.

Collins was a Democrat. He was elected as a member of the Ohio House of Representatives, representing Stark County, in 1912. He served from 1913 to his death. He wrote a food trust bill that prevent monopolies by companies making food stuffs.

== Personal life ==
Collins married Mary C. Mellen of Millport in 1888.

Collins died following heart trouble on October 31, 1913, at his home in Canton.
