= Juice Plus =

Line of dietary supplements

- Founded: 1993
- Founder: Jay Martin
- Headquarters: United States
- Website: us.juiceplus.com

Juice Plus is a branded line of dietary supplements. It is produced by Natural Alternatives International of San Marcos, California, for National Safety Associates (NSA; Collierville, Tennessee). Introduced in 1993, the supplements are distributed by NSA via multi-level marketing. Juice Plus supplements contain fruit and vegetable juice extracts with added vitamins and nutrients.

National Safety Associates, founded in 1970, initially sold fire protection and water filtration products using a multi-level marketing model and later expanded internationally. In 1993, they launched the Juice Plus+ supplement line and have since supported philanthropic efforts such as the St. Jude Memphis Marathon. Juice Plus capsules are made by powdering fruit and vegetable juices through a proprietary process by an external supplier, then blended and encapsulated by Nutritional Alliances, Inc., and enriched with standardized nutrients like β-carotene, vitamin E, and ascorbic acid.

ConsumerLab tested Juice Plus+ Garden Blend and found it contained only 76.4% of its claimed calcium using a precise ICP-MS method, despite distributor claims otherwise. Juice Plus products are sold by individual distributors earning 6–14% commissions, with sales reportedly reaching $6 million monthly in 1993 and growing to nearly $300 million annually by 2008 before leveling off.

There is no good evidence that Juice Plus offers health benefits. Juice Plus is widely criticized for having unsupported health claims, low fruit and vegetable content, excessive cost, and conflicts of interest in its research. In multiple countries between 2019 and 2020, Juice Plus faced fines and warnings for deceptive marketing practices, including fake testimonials, illegal health claims, unauthorized endorsements, and false income promises. O. J. Simpson, a former athlete who endorsed Juice Plus with unverified health claims about curing his arthritis, was later involved in controversy during his murder trial where he claimed arthritis incapacitation, leading to the cancellation of his Juice Plus endorsement contract. The Juice Plus Children's Research Foundation, founded in 1997 to promote children's health, is criticized for conducting scientifically questionable research and primarily serving as a marketing tool to promote Juice Plus products.

== History ==
=== Foundation and early marketing ===
National Safety Associates was founded in 1970 by Jay Martin, a schoolteacher-turned-entrepreneur, who continued as CEO as of 2012. NSA initially sold home fire-protection equipment via door-to-door salespeople. In the late 1970s, they expanded into water filtration products. In 1986, they began using multi-level marketing, then expanding their product line to air filters and educational games for pre-schoolers. In 1991, it was claimed that their sales structure constituted a Ponzi scheme.

In 1993, the United States Attorney General's office followed up on complaints that the company was deceptively requiring new distributors to make large upfront purchases of air and water filters. Each of the 32,000 distributors in Florida purchased an average of $7,000 worth of water filters, and many of these distributors were unable to sell all of them. The company's business in the United States decreased that year, requiring the layoff of dozens of employees.

NSA later expanded its business outside the United States, and according to the company, was selling products in 33 countries as of 2000. NSA stopped manufacturing and marketing its water filter product line in 2007.

=== Supplement products ===
Juice Plus was NSA's first product, launched in 1993. The primary products in the Juice Plus line include "Orchard Blend" (a fruit juice powder-based supplement) and "Garden Blend" (vegetable juice powder-based) capsules, which are sold together in a four-month pack at a cost of approximately US$167 (2009). Other supplement products available in the Juice Plus line as of 2011 included Vineyard Blend (grape/berry juice powder-based) capsules, Juice Plus Complete (meal replacement powder), Juice Plus Chewables (Orchard and Garden Blends), and Juice Plus Chewables (Vineyard Blend). Discontinued products include Juice Plus Gummies, Juice Plus Thins (wafers), chewable tablets, and a vitamin formulation for dogs and cats.

In 2024, Juice Plus+’s launched Luminate, which claims to support mental clarity and cognitive health, along with overall well-being. While it uses scientifically validated ingredients, the product statements have not been evaluated by the FDA.

In 2025, NewBeauty magazine mentioned a new Juice Plus powder product in the context of a wider trend toward combining fruit, vegetable, and berry ingredients into single supplement formats.

=== Philanthropy ===
Juice Plus+ will serve as the presenting sponsor at the 2024 St. Jude Memphis Marathon Weekend, a fundraiser for St. Jude Children’s Research Hospital. The company has supported this event for 23 years and last year raised over $143,000 in support of pediatric cancer research and treatment.

== Manufacturing ==
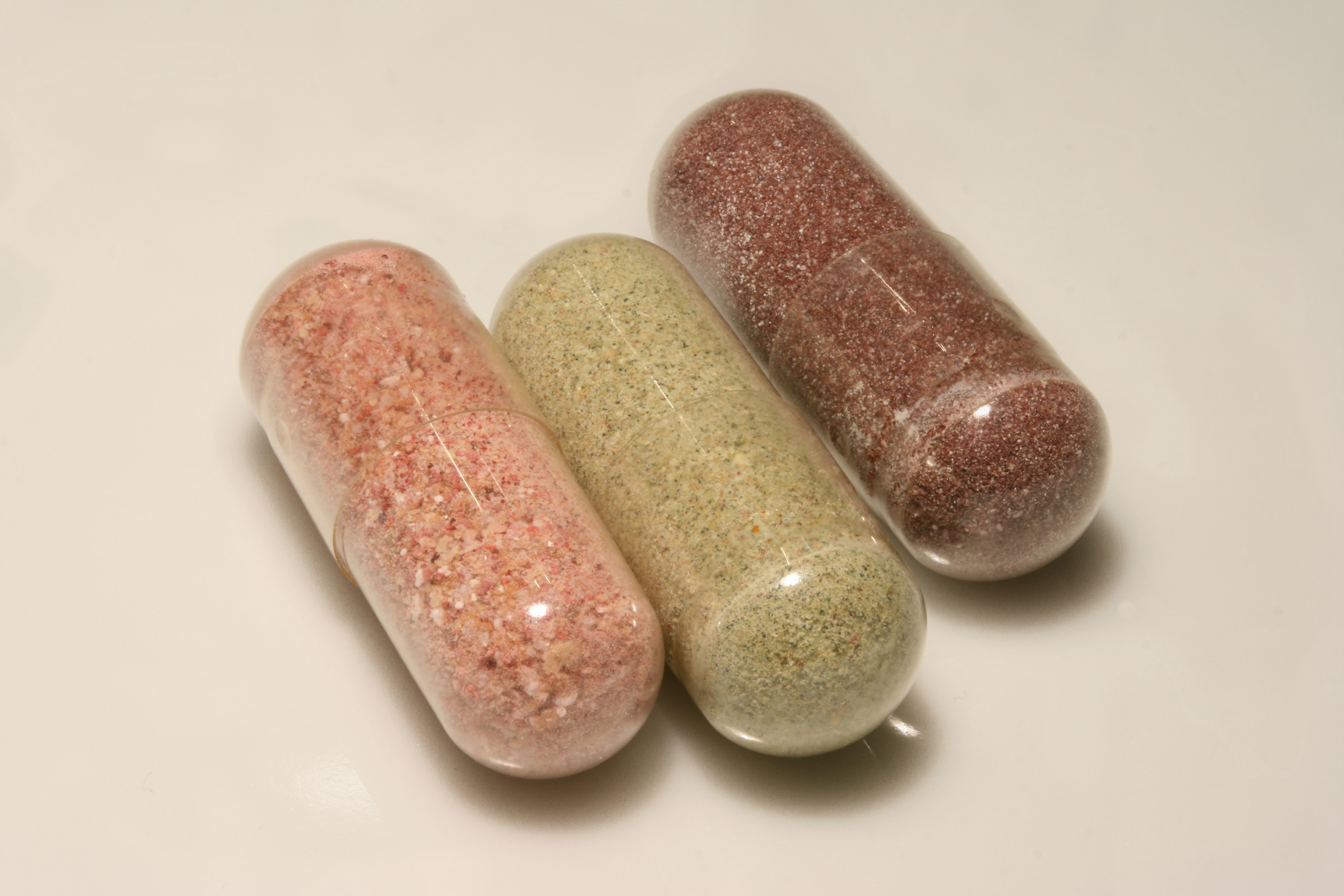
Juice Plus capsules

The main ingredients in Juice Plus Orchard Blend and Garden Blend capsules (vegetable and fruit juices) are reduced to powder through a proprietary process by an unrelated supplier, and then blended and encapsulated by NAI, which produces the finished product. Juice Plus capsules are "enriched with pure β-carotene, ascorbic acid, vitamin E, and folic acid". Two NAI-sponsored studies mention that the fruit and vegetable powders in Juice Plus include standardized levels of natural β-carotene derived from Dunaliella salina and soy-derived d-α-tocopherol (vitamin E), which are supplied by the Henkel Corporation (now doing business as Cognis Corporation), and ascorbic acid derived from acerola cherry, which is supplied by Schweizerhall Pharma.

== ConsumerLab product testing ==
Juice Plus+ Garden Blend was tested by ConsumerLab.com in their Multivitamin and Multimineral Supplements Review of 38 of the leading multivitamin/multimineral products sold in the U.S. and Canada. Testing included amounts of selected index elements, their ability to disintegrate in solution per United States Pharmacopeia guidelines, lead contamination threshold set in California Proposition 65, and meeting U.S. Food and Drug Administration (FDA) labeling requirements.

Garden Blend failed ConsumerLab's test as it contained only 76.4% of its claimed calcium, which was noted was low to start (labeled as just 4% of the Daily Value per serving.) On 23 June 2011, ConsumerLab was informed of misinformation circulated by a Juice Plus distributor incorrectly stating the variation was due to the analytical method used. ConsumerLab responded that their analytic method used was ICP-MS (Inductively Coupled Plasma Mass Spectrometry), a "highly precise and sensitive method of testing calcium". ConsumerLab also noted that the calcium deficiency in Juice Plus was confirmed with this method in two independent laboratories prior to publication of their Review.

== Sales ==
Juice Plus products are marketed by individual distributors who receive sales commissions ranging from 6% (for enrolling five customers in 30 days) to 14% (for enrolling 20 customers in 30 days). Detailed sales figures for Juice Plus are not publicly available, but NSA representatives claimed that Juice Plus achieved monthly sales of $6 million in 1993 and that it was the company's most successful new product. According to NSA vice-president John Blair, sales of Juice Plus in 2008 were "approaching $300 million but have leveled off due to economic factors."

== Product research ==
Doubts have been raised about the advertised benefits of Juice Plus by Memorial Sloan-Kettering Cancer Center, University of California Berkeley, Center for Science in the Public Interest, and other sources. The product has been criticized on the basis that: its marketing is unsupported by research data, it contains too little fruit and vegetable powder to offer significant clinical benefits, its effects can be attributed to the inclusion of added exogenous vitamins and micronutrients, and it is excessively priced relative to its potential benefits. Memorial Sloan-Kettering Cancer Clinic referred to Juice Plus as a "pricey supplement" that is "distributed through a multi-tiered marketing scheme with exaggerated value and cost."

=== Nutrients and phytochemicals ===
Concerns have been raised that the nutrients in Juice Plus+ capsules may not be bioavailable or effectively absorbed by the human body, and that some of the nutrients claimed to be in the products may not be present in significant amounts. Studies on nutrient absorption showed that subjects taking Juice Plus had elevated blood levels of folate and β-carotene, but the effects on blood levels of vitamin E and vitamin C were inconsistent. Some studies have shown significant increases in vitamin E and C levels, while other studies have shown much weaker effects on vitamin E and C levels, and that the levels of vitamin E and vitamin C are not significantly increased. Juice Plus was found to increase blood lycopene levels in several studies, while other studies have indicated that Juice Plus does not raise blood levels of lycopene or other phytochemicals in fresh fruits and vegetables such as lutein, zeaxanthin, and β-cryptoxanthin.

=== Conflicts of interest in studies ===
In a critique of Juice Plus, consumer health advocate and alternative medicine critic Stephen Barrett of MLM Watch remarked upon the previous association between two authors of a 1996 Juice Plus research study and United Sciences of America, Inc. (USAI), a multilevel marketing company that sold vitamin supplements with illegal claims that they could prevent many diseases. In 1986, lead author John A. Wise, who later co-authored several other Juice Plus research studies, was USAI's Executive Vice-president of Research and Development; and second author Robert J. Morin was a scientific advisor who helped design the products. State and federal enforcement actions drove USAI out of business in 1987. Wise became a consultant to Natural Alternatives International (NAI) in 1987 and a company executive (vice-president of Research and Development) in 1992. Barrett noted that Wise was also an NAI shareholder and that production of Juice Plus for National Safety Associates (NSA) was responsible for 16% of NAI's sales in 1999.

NSAs Juice Plus website cites various research articles in support of the company's marketing claims about the biological effects of Juice Plus, maintaining that these "studies were conducted by independent researchers" at various universities. Several of the studies were co-authored by Wise and Morin.

== Advertising violations ==
In 2019, companies trading under the Juice Plus brand name in Italy, Germany, and the United Kingdom were levied a €1 million penalty by Italy's Competition and Market Authority (AGCM) for deceptive marketing practices in breach of European Union advertising law. The AGCM cited evidence that the companies were posting fake user testimonials alleging that the products could help with weight loss and disease treatment. The parties involved had previously been the subject of an investigation on the Italian television program Patti Chiari that looked into the sales tactics used by distributors to market the products, and which revealed the use of secret Facebook groups where distributors were posing as satisfied customers.

In February 2020, the company that markets Juice Plus in Australia was hit with a $37,800 penalty by the Australian Therapeutic Goods Administration (TGA) subsequent to the issuance of three infringement notices relating to the promotion of Juice Plus vitamin products for medical conditions, and to the use of endorsements by health professionals, in violation of the Therapeutic Goods Advertising Code.

In June 2020, the US Federal Trade Commission (FTC) issued a warning letter to the Juice Plus Company for making unlawful claims that the company's products could treat or prevent COVID-19, as well as misleading claims that business opportunity participants were likely to earn substantial income.

== O. J. Simpson ==
University of California Berkeley Wellness Letter and MLMWatch commented on the unreliability of Juice Plus testimonials provided by former professional athlete O. J. Simpson. Simpson, known commonly as "O. J." and "The Juice", signed a multi-year six-figure contract with NSA in January 1994 and became an official celebrity endorser of Juice Plus. In March 1994, Simpson was videotaped telling 4,000 Juice Plus distributors at a sales meeting that the product had cured his arthritis, improved his golf game, and freed him from using anti-arthritic drugs. However, regarding the murder of his ex-wife Nicole Brown Simpson and her friend, Ronald Goldman, for which Simpson was tried and acquitted, Simpson claimed in his defence that he was too incapacitated by arthritis to have committed the murders and had continued to take the anti-inflammatory drug sulfasalazine. As a result of the controversy surrounding Simpson, NSA cancelled his endorsement contract and stopped using the Simpson videotape to promote Juice Plus.

== Juice Plus Children's Research Foundation ==
The Juice Plus Children's Research Foundation (JPCRF), founded in 1997, is a non-profit medical research organization (NTEE code H99). Its stated goal is to promote better health in children. The foundation is chaired by executives of National Safety Associates and operates from the company's head office in Collierville, Tennessee. In fiscal year 2007, the majority of funds donated to the foundation were disbursed to Volunteers of America (a faith-based social welfare organization) and to the Boys & Girls Clubs of Memphis.

The Foundation's website shows results of an ongoing customer survey (The Juice Plus Children's Health Study) which suggests a link between Juice Plus consumption and a general improvement in diet and lifestyle habits. The University of California Berkeley Wellness Letter and Stephen Barrett of MLM Watch questioned the survey's scientific value, and claimed that the Foundation is being used mainly as a marketing gimmick to get families to buy Juice Plus products. Barrett's organization Quackwatch includes the JPCRF among its list of "Questionable 'Research' Entities".

== See also ==
- List of ineffective cancer treatments
