= E. H. Thompson =

Mrs. E. H. Thompson was an American author and educator who wrote From the Thames to the Trossachs, published by New York company Hunt and Eaton in 1890.

== Biography ==
Mrs. E. H. Thompson was an active writer in the 1870s through to the early 1900s at least. Much of her work was published by the Zion's Herald (later to be known as The Progressive Christian), a Methodist weekly magazine. Her contributions to the Herald had a moral and religious focus, recommending school activities and prayers for school children, and warning of the dangers of excessive drinking.

== From the Thames to the Trossachs ==
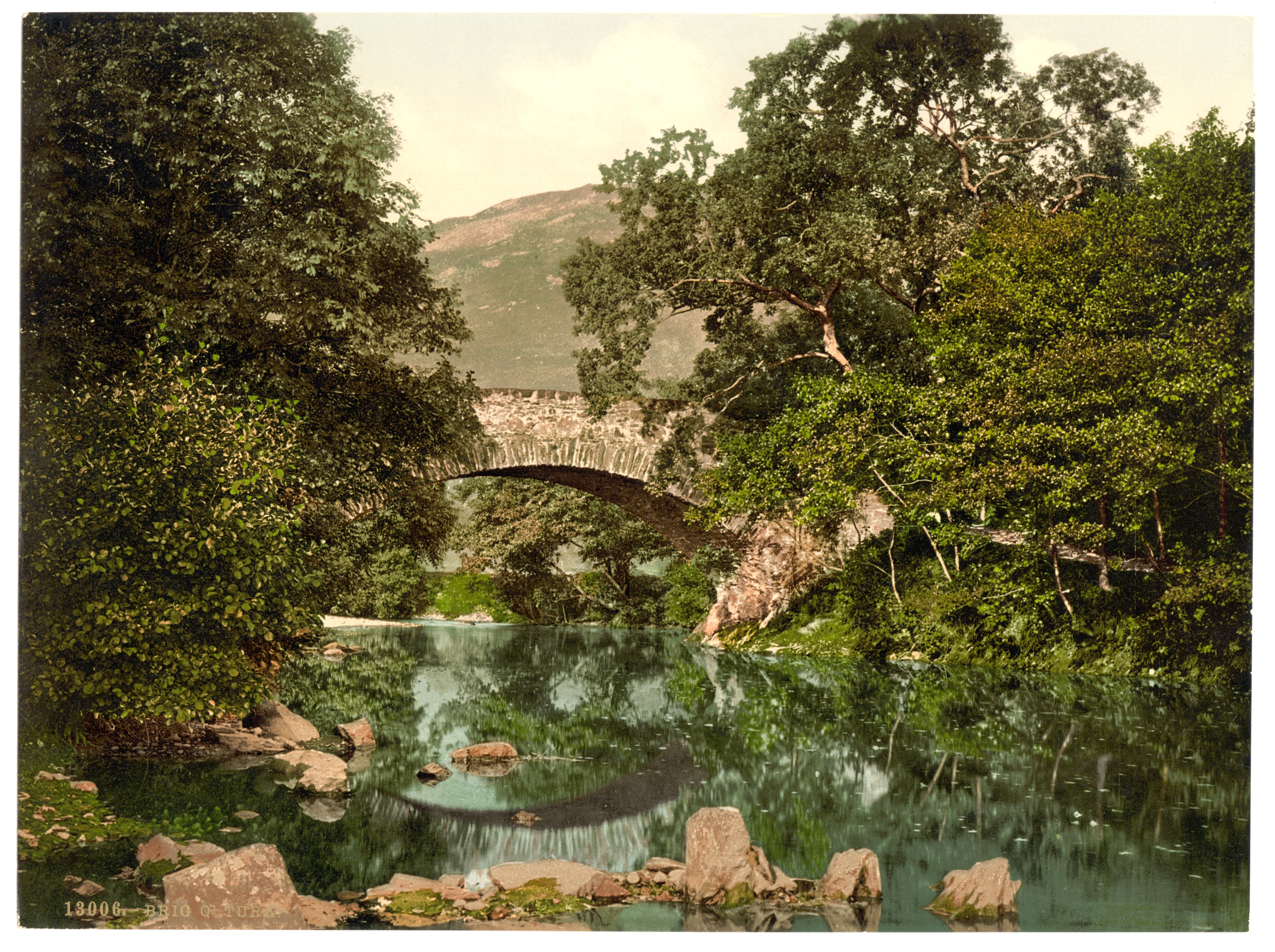
Brig o Turk Trossachs Scotland - An illustration of the titled destination in E.H. Thompson's book.

From the Thames to the Trossachs is a book of travel writing, written for the Epworth League, a Methodist young adult association for individuals from 18 to 35. An excerpt from the novel explains that "It was thought that some work on foreign travel would prove interesting to the readers in the League, and would suggest valuable programmes for literary meetings.". And the reason that the topic of the book focused on the United Kingdom being "All that is best in England is the heritage of America. Her literature is our literature, for we may enjoy Chaucer's tale and Shakespeare's strain and Bunyan's immortal dream and Browning's "veined humanity."

== Selected works ==
- Foreign tourists' series
- Beware of strong drink, 1879
- From the Thames to the Trossachs, 1890
