= Michael Wise =

Michael or Mike Wise may refer to:

- Michael Wise (musician) (1648–1687), English organist/composer
- Michael John Wise (1918–2015), British geographer
- Mike Wise (American football) (1964–1992), American football defensive end
- Mike Wise (columnist) (1964–2026), American sports columnist and feature writer
- Mike Wise (politician), former member of the Ohio House of Representatives
- Mike Wise (record producer), Canadian music producer, songwriter, and engineer

== See also ==
- Wise (surname)
