= Wise Observatory =

Astronomical observatory in Israel

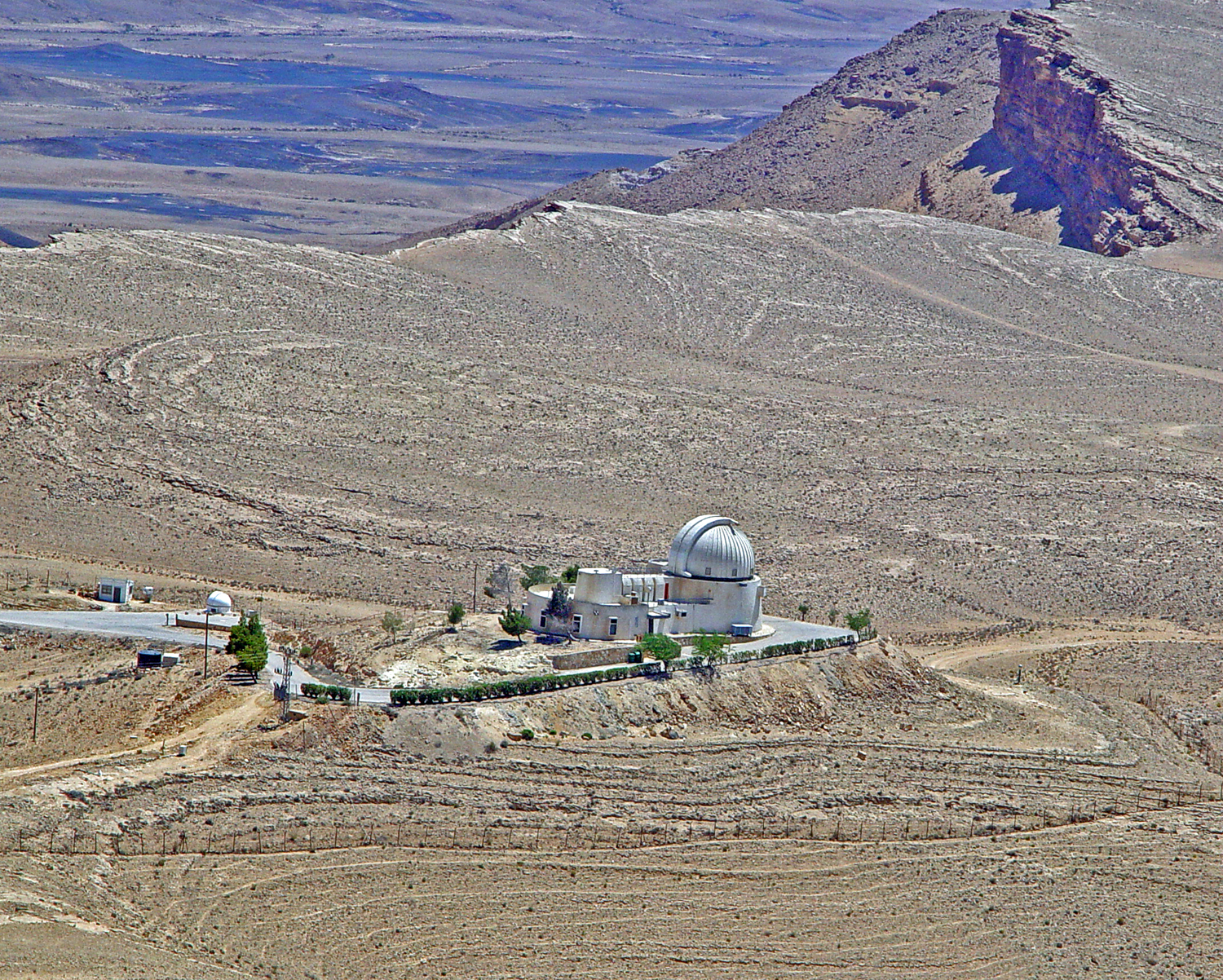
- Organization: Tel Aviv University
- Observatory code: 097
- Location: On the edge of Makhtesh Ramon, near Mizpe Ramon, Israel
- Coordinates: 30°35′50.6″N 34°45′43.9″E
- Altitude: 875 m (2,871 ft)
- Established: 1971
- Website: Wise Observatory

Telescopes
- One Meter: 100 cm Ritchey–Chrétien
- C18 46cm: 46 cm Centurion Prime-Focus Reflector
- WHAT: 10 cm Wise Hungarian Automated Telescope
- Related media on Commons

The Florence and George Wise Observatory (IAU code 097) is an astronomical observatory owned and operated by Tel Aviv University. It is located 5 kilometers (3.1 miles) west of the town of Mitzpe Ramon in the Negev desert near the edge of the Ramon Crater, and it is the only professional astronomical observatory in Israel.

== History ==
The observatory was founded in October 1971 as a collaboration between Tel Aviv University and the Smithsonian Institution, and named after the late Dr. George S. Wise, the first President of the Tel Aviv University. The observatory is a research laboratory of Tel Aviv University. It belongs to the Raymond and Beverly Sackler Faculty of Exact Sciences and it serves mainly staff and graduate students from the Department of Astronomy and Astrophysics of the School of Physics and Astronomy, and from the Department of Geophysics and Planetary Sciences. Traditionally, the Wise Observatory Director is appointed by Tel Aviv University's Dean of Exact Sciences from the senior academic staff of the Department of Astronomy and Astrophysics.

The directors of the Wise Observatory since its foundation were:

- Uri Feldman (1971–1973)
- Asher Gottesman (1973–1975)
- Dror Sadeh (1975–1977)
- Elia Leibowitz (1977–1980)
- Hagai Netzer (1980–1983)
- Elia Leibowitz (1983–1988)
- Tsevi Mazeh (1988–1990)
- Hagai Netzer (1990–1991)
- Elia Leibowitz (1991–1998)
- Dan Maoz (1998–2000)
- Noah Brosch (2000–2006)
- Tsevi Mazeh (2006 – February 2007)
- Noah Brosch (February 2007 – 2010)
- Tsevi Mazeh (2011–2012)
- Dan Maoz (since 2012)

== Site ==
The number of clear nights (zero cloudiness) at the Wise Observatory site is about 170 a year. The number of useful nights, with part of the night cloud-free, is about 240. The best season, when practically no clouds are observed, is June to August, while the highest chance for clouds are in the period January to April. Winds are usually moderate, mainly from North-East and North. Storm wind velocities (greater than 40 kilometers per hour (25 miles per hour)) occur, but rarely. The wind speed tends to decrease during the night. Temperature gradients are small and fairly moderate. The average relative humidity is quite high, with a tendency to decline during the night from April to August.

The average seeing is about 2-3 seconds of arc. A few good nights have seeing of 1" or less, while few show seeing larger than 5".

An important advantage of the Wise Observatory at its location of ~35°E in the Northern Hemisphere is the possibility of cooperating with observatories at other longitudes for time-series studies. Such projects involve searches for stellar oscillations within the Whole Earth Telescope project, monitoring gravitational microlensing events, combined ground and space observing campaigns, etc.

== Research highlights and discoveries ==
Minor planet discoveries
(9804) 1997 NU	July 1, 1997	^{[A]}
(148094) 1999 GP_{6}	April 15, 1999	^{[3]}
(36031) 1999 NG_{64}	July 10, 1999	^{[3]}
137217 Racah	July 8, 1999	^{[1]}
(249712) 2000 QU_{68}	August 24, 2000	^{[3]}
(139308) 2001 KH_{20}	May 22, 2001	^{[3]}
(193766) 2001 MW_{1}	June 18, 2001	^{[3]}
(239963) 2001 MX_{1}	June 18, 2001	^{[3]}
128054 Eranyavneh	June 28, 2003	^{[2]}
(143644) 2003 OE_{3}	July 23, 2003	^{[2]}
161315 de Shalit	August 19, 2003	^{[2]}
(163762) 2003 OH_{20}	July 25, 2003	^{[2]}
(170813) 2004 DW_{71}	February 25, 2004	^{[2]}
172425 Taliajacobi	July 25, 2003	^{[2]}
(159871) 2004 QF_{17}	August 23, 2004	^{[3]}
(191671) 2004 QC_{20}	August 25, 2004	^{[3]}
(202002) 2004 QW_{7}	August 22, 2004	^{[3]}
(227033) 2005 AM_{26}	January 11, 2005	^{[3]}
(230635) 2003 QO_{3}	August 18, 2003	^{[2]}
(232498) 2003 QT_{5}	August 19, 2003	^{[2]}
(254166) 2004 QP_{5}	August 20, 2004	^{[3]}
(260585) 2005 EJ_{287}	March 5, 2005	^{[3]}
(317702) 2003 QN_{3}	August 17, 2003	^{[2]}
(323186) 2003 OE_{16}	July 24, 2003	^{[3]}
(323506) 2004 QF_{28}	August 23, 2004	^{[3]}
Discovery credited to:^{A} E. O. Ofek^{1} I. Manulis and A. Gal-Yam^{2} D. Polishook^{3} Wise Observatory (as of 2016)

A project to monitor photometrically and spectroscopically Active Galactic Nuclei (AGNs) is still running, following about 30 years of data collection. Other major projects include searches for supernovae and extrasolar planets (transiting or lensing), and investigations of star formation processes in galaxies through wide and narrow-band filter imaging. Lately, some emphasis is put on studies of Near Earth Objects (NEOs), with the research focus being the rotational properties of NEOs and of other asteroids through the investigation of their light curves.

As of 2016, the Wise Observatory is credited by the Minor Planet Center with the discovery of 17 numbered minor planets during 1999–2007. Moreover, another 8 minor planets were discovered at the Wise Observatory, but are now credited to the individual astronomers such as David Polishook (see adjunct table and footnotes).

== Equipment ==
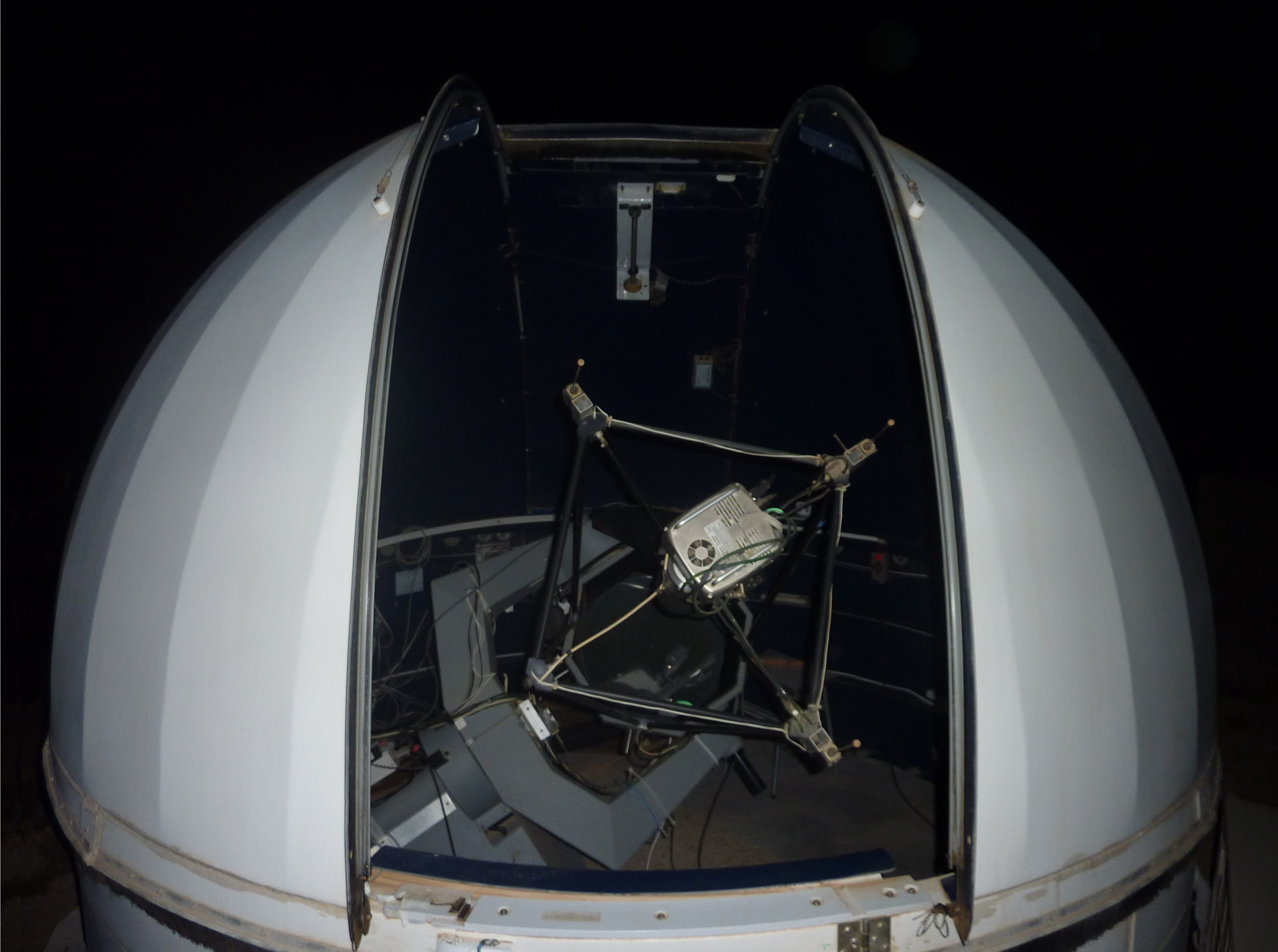
The smaller 46cm Telescope in its dome

The observatory operates a 1 meter (3.3 feet)-diameter Boller and Chivens telescope, which is a wide-field Ritchey-Chrétien reflector mounted on a rigid, off-axis equatorial mount. This telescope was originally a twin of the Las Campanas 1 m Swope telescope, which was described by Bowen and Vaughan (1973), though the two instruments diverged somewhat during the years. It also has two CCD cameras, a two-star "Nather-type" photometer, a "Faint-object spectrograph-camera" (FOSC), and an older Boller and Chivens spectrograph. The photoelectric photometer and the Boller and Chivens spectrograph have not been in use for more than a decade.

A dioptric focal reducer (Maala) was used at f/7 to project a field of view almost one-degree wide on one of the CCDs (a SITe 2048x4096 pixel array) at the cost of slightly larger than optimal PSF sampling and some edge-of-field distortions. However, this instrument never produced satisfactory images and its use was discontinued.

A new CCD camera entered regular use in 2006: it is a Princeton Instruments Versarray with 1340×1300 pixels each 20 μm wide, with a peak quantum efficiency of 95% and good response in the blue part of the spectrum. Another camera was operated from the end of 2007 to about 2014; this is a CCD mosaic covering a one-degree non-contiguous field of view at f/7 in a single exposure (the LAIWO (Large Array Imager of the Wise Observatory) camera). This camera is composed of four 4096x4096 pixel non-butted Fairchild CCDs that are thick and front-illuminated, thus have a response peaking in the red with approximately 42% quantum efficiency. A smaller CCD with very high quantum efficiency and fast readout, centered between the four large CCDs, is used for guiding and fast photometry of selected objects. LAIWO was a cooperative endeavour of the Wise Observatory (PI: T. Mazeh) with the Max Planck Institute for Astronomy Heidelberg (PI: T. Henning).

A 46 centimeters (18 inches) prime-focus computer-controlled telescope was added to the Wise Observatory in 2005 mainly for minor planet CCD photometry purposes and funded by the Israel Space Agency as part of a National Knowledge Center on Near Earth Objects. This is a Centurion-18 (C18) that has been extensively modified by the observatory staff in a continuous effort to transform it into a robotic telescope. The telescope was originally equipped with a thermoelectrically cooled SBIG ST-10XME CCD camera with 2184x1472 pixels each 6.8 micrometres wide, each subtending slightly more than one arcsec at the telescope prime focus. Since early-2009 this CCD was replaced by an SBIG STL-6303 CCD with 2048x3072 pixels, each 9 micrometers wide. The telescope and its camera, including the telescope dome, can be remotely operated.

A 70 cm (28-inch) prime-focus telescope, essentially the "big brother" of the C18 and called the Jay Baum Rich Telescope (JBRT), was added in 2013. This telescope has been commissioned and is in routine robotic operation.

A 50 centimeters (20 inches) wide-field telescope has been installed in 2016 and is being commissioned. This telescope is a node of the Korean OWL-Net (Optical Wide-field patroL Network) that acquires and maintains orbital information of LEO satellites by purely optical means. OWL-Net is part of and is operated by the Korea Astronomy and Space Science Institute (KASI).

== Observing time ==
Observations at the Wise Observatory are allocated on a semestrial basis for the periods from the beginning of April to the end of September (first semester) and from the beginning of October to the end of March the following year (second semester). The allocation is competitive and is based on the scientific merit of each proposal. The observing time is, in principle, open to qualified observers from all over the world. Over the years, most of the observing time during a given period has been allocated to one or two large, long-term, projects carried out by Tel Aviv faculty and graduate students.

== See also ==
- List of astronomical observatories
