= David Wise =

David Wise may refer to:

- David Wise (freestyle skier) (born 1990), American freestyle skier
- David Wise (cricketer) (born 1966), former English cricketer
- David Wise (composer) (born 1967), British video game music composer
- David Wise (journalist) (1930-2018), American investigative journalist and writer, winner of the 1975 Orwell Award
- David Wise (writer) (1955-2020), American television writer

== See also ==
- David Burgess-Wise, motoring author and automobile historian
