= Andy Alleman =

American football player (born 1983)

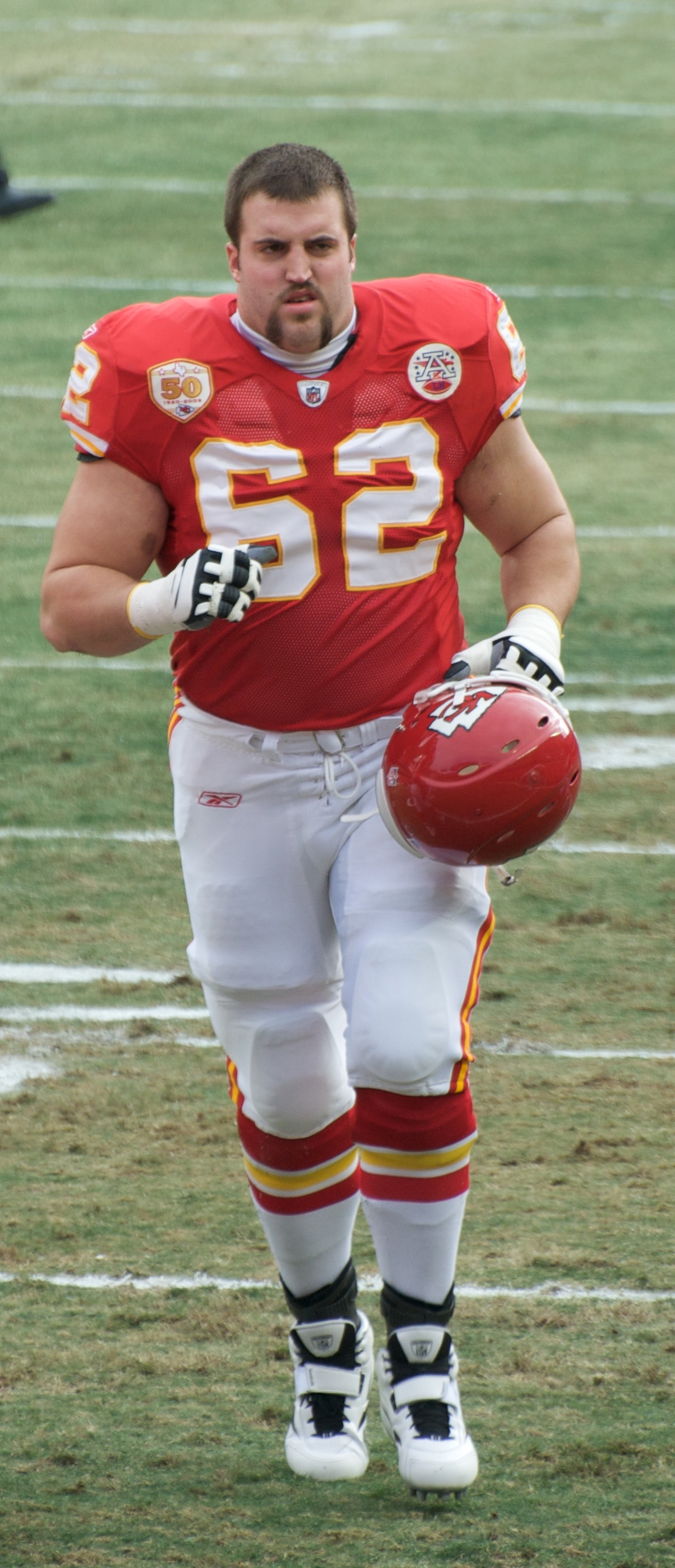
- Alleman with the Kansas City Chiefs in 2009

No. 57, 62
- Position: Guard

Personal information
- Born: November 20, 1983 (age 42); Akron, Ohio, U.S.
- Listed height: 6 ft 4 in (1.93 m)
- Listed weight: 305 lb (138 kg)

Career information
- High school: Massillon Washington (Massillon, Ohio)
- College: Akron
- NFL draft: 2007: 3rd round, 88th overall pick

Career history
- New Orleans Saints (2007); Miami Dolphins (2008); Kansas City Chiefs (2009); Indianapolis Colts (2010)*
- * Offseason or practice squad member only

Career NFL statistics
- Games played: 24
- Games started: 7
- Stats at Pro Football Reference

Andrew Alleman (born November 20, 1983) is an American former professional football player who was a guard in the National Football League (NFL). He was selected by the New Orleans Saints in the third round of the 2007 NFL draft. He played college football at The University of Akron.

Alleman was also a member of the Miami Dolphins, Kansas City Chiefs and Indianapolis Colts.

== Early life ==
Alleman grew up in Greentown, Ohio and played high school football at Massillon Washington High School in Massillon.
