= Daniel Wise =

Daniel Wise may refer to:

- Daniel Wise (author) (1813–1898), Methodist Episcopal clerical author
- Daniel Wise (playwright), contemporary playwright, producer, and author
- Daniel Wise (mathematician) (born 1971), American mathematician
- Daniel Wise (gridiron football), American football defensive end
