= John Cooke (Six Preacher) =

Rev. John Cooke (1646/47 – 1726) was a post-Restoration Church of England clergyman.

He was the son of Thomas Cooke of Bromsgrove, Worcestershire and was educated at Christ Church, Oxford (matriculated 1663, B.A. 1666, M.A. 1669). He was rector of Cuxton, Kent (1674–1677), of Mersham, Kent (1677–1726), and rector of St George the Martyr with St Mary Magdalene, Canterbury (1692–1726). He was appointed a Six Preacher of Canterbury Cathedral in 1687 and was Proctor for the diocese of Canterbury in 1699. He died on 13 August 1726 and was buried in the parish church at Mersham.

His widow published his Thirty Nine Sermons on Several Occasions in 1729 (second edition in 1736) and Some considerations touching the payment of tythes: address’d to the professors of religion, commonly call’d Quakers, in the parish of Mersham in about 1729/1730.
