= Thomas Bartlett (theologian) =

English clergyman and writer (1789–1872)

Thomas Bartlett (1789 – 1872) was an English clergyman and theological writer.

== Life ==
Bartlett was educated at St Edmund Hall, Oxford, and graduated B.A. 1813, and M.A. 1816 [Joseph Foster, 'Alumni Oxonienses']. He held the living of Kingston, near Canterbury, from 1816 to 1852; he was then preferred to Chevening, near Sevenoaks. In 1854 he moved on to Luton, Bedfordshire, and in 1857 to Burton Latimer, Northamptonshire. In 1832 he became one of the Six preachers of Canterbury Cathedral.

== Works ==
While at Kingston he produced a succession of pamphlets, letters, and sermons, maintaining evangelical tenets. He married a great-great-niece of Bishop Joseph Butler, the author of the Analogy, and he published a Memoir of the Life, Character, and Writings of Bishop Butler (1839), followed by an index to the Analogy (1842).
