= Six Preachers =

The college of Six Preachers of Canterbury Cathedral was created by Archbishop Thomas Cranmer as part of the reorganisation of the monastic Christ Church Priory into the new secular Cathedral. First mentioned in a letter of Cranmer to Thomas Cromwell in 1540, the Six Preachers were established by the Statutes of 1541. They were provided with houses in the Precincts but quickly became non-resident and rented out their properties. They had the right to dine with the Dean and Canons and to sit in the stalls in the quire with the canons during services. They were required to preach 20 sermons a year in their own parishes or in a church dependent on the Cathedral, as well as preaching in the Cathedral.

There has been an unbroken succession of Six Preachers from 1544 to the present day. In 1982 one of the twentieth-century Six Preachers, Canon Derek Ingram Hill, marked the appointment of the 200th Six Preacher with the publication of a small book detailing the history of the institution and giving a short biography of each of its occupants.

== Notable Six Preachers ==
- John Scory : 1541
- Lancelot Ridley : 1541–1554, 1560–
- Richard Turner : 1550
- Thomas Beccon : c. 1550
- Rowland Taylor : 1551
- Richard Clarke : 1602
- Richard Culmer : 1644
- John Cooke : 1687
- Thomas Wise : 1711
- John Duncombe : c.1760
- Evelyn Levett Sutton : 1811 (see under Charles Manners-Sutton)
- Henry John Todd: 1818
- Thomas Bartlett: 1832
- Francis Nixon : 1841
- Francis James Holland : 1859
- Randall Thomas Davidson 1882
- Richard Hodgson : 1908
- John A. T. Robinson : 1958
- Derek Ingram Hill : 1964
- Michael Green : 1993
- Michael Battle : 2010
- Tory Baucum : 2014
