= Frank C. Wise =

American politician (1864–1956)

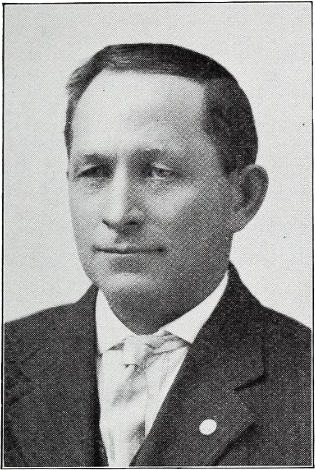
- Wise in 1918 publication

Member of the Ohio Senate from the 21st district
- In office 1923–1930

Member of the Ohio House of Representatives from the Stark County district
- In office 1917–1920 Serving with Jesse S. Miller and Harvey S. Cable
- Preceded by: Adam W. Oberlin and Walter G. Agler

Personal details
- Born: February 1864 Greentown, Ohio, U.S.
- Died: April 11, 1956 (aged 92) Tampa, Florida, U.S.
- Resting place: North Canton, Ohio, U.S.
- Party: Republican
- Spouse: Josephine Moody
- Children: 1
- Education: Ohio Northern University
- Occupation: Politician; farmer; bank president; educator

Frank C. Wise (February 1864 – April 11, 1956) was an American politician from Ohio. He served as a member of the Ohio House of Representatives, representing Stark County from 1917 to 1920. He served in the Ohio Senate from 1923 to 1930.

== Early life ==
Frank C. Wise was born on February 11 (or 14), 1864, in Greentown, Ohio. He was educated at schools in Greentown and at Ohio Northern University.

== Career ==
Wise taught school for twelve years. He served as treasurer of Plain Township for three terms and was a member of the school board in New Berlin (later North Canton) for four years. He served as a delegate of Stark County at the fourth constitutional convention in 1912. Wise served as the mayor of North Canton.

He was a member of the Ohio House of Representatives, representing Stark County from 1917 to 1920. In 1922, he was elected to the Ohio Senate, representing the 21st district. He was re-elected in 1924, 1926 and 1928. In 1936, Wise ran for the Republican nomination for Ohio House of Representatives, but lost.

Wise was president of the North Canton Bank and was an officer of the Ohio State Grange. He also worked as a farmer.

== Personal life ==
Wise married Josephine Moody. He had one son, Harry D. He lived in North Canton. He moved to Tampa, Florida, around 1949.

Wise died on April 11, 1956, at a nursing home in Tampa. He was buried in North Canton.
