= Derek Ingram Hill =

Derek Ingram Hill (11 September 1912 – 20 October 2003) was an Anglican priest, notable as a pastor, administrator and historian, active mainly in the south-east of England and particularly in the city of Canterbury and its cathedral.

== Early life and education ==
Derek Ingram Hill was born in Wimbledon, London but moved to Margate in 1916 for health reasons. At the age of 11, he was sent to The King's School, Canterbury, where he first formed a strong attachment to the cathedral and its pattern of worship and wrote a short guide to it. He then went to Trinity College, Oxford, to study modern history. At Trinity he developed a wider interest in the medieval churches of England. He visited every cathedral in the country by bicycle and wrote a study of the stained glass of Oxford. Moving to Wells Theological College to study for ordination, he again wrote a study of stained glass in local churches.

== Parish ministry ==
Ingram Hill was ordained in 1935 and became curate at Buckland-in-Dover. This facilitated his developing interest in the cathedrals and abbeys of northern France, which he explored each summer, as usual by bicycle. However, he also built a growing reputation for his parish work, moving to a further curacy at St Andrew's, Croydon, in 1939, and later taking over as priest-in-charge and then vicar at Holy Innocents, South Norwood. This was at a time of constant danger during the London Blitz, but he made a great success of Holy Innocents, where he ministered for 14 years.

Ingram Hill was invited to return to Canterbury by Archbishop Geoffrey Fisher in 1957, to take up the post of Vicar of St Gregory's. From there he moved a short distance in 1965 to become Rector of St Peter and St Alphege and Master of the Hospital of St. Thomas the Martyr, Eastbridge. In 1972 his work was extended to St Mildred with St Mary de Castro, the oldest church within the city walls, which had to be restored after a fire. In common with most English cities, Canterbury was undergoing a process of suburban growth, greatly intensified by the rapid development of the centre as a tourist attraction and the growth of the University and teacher training college (now Canterbury Christ Church University). Ingram Hill initiated a series of changes in use of church buildings, with St Alphege's itself ultimately becoming the Canterbury Environment Centre.

This work led him into membership of the Redundant Churches (now the Churches Conservation Trust), a charity which takes responsibility for Anglican churches no longer required for worship. He pursued his historical and conservation interests further through the Kent Archaeological Society and the Friends of Kent Churches. He was also a member of the General Synod of the Church of England for nearly a decade, from 1965 until 1974 and, for a time, the archbishop's adviser to diocesan schools.

== Involvement with the cathedral ==
In 1964, while still at St Gregory's, Ingram Hill was appointed a member of the college of Six Preachers – originally a body charged by Archbishop Thomas Cranmer with preaching against Roman Catholicism, but by this time an honorific appointment, allowing the holder to sit with the Dean and Canons in cathedral services. He was made an Honorary Canon of the Cathedral in 1970.

In 1976 Archbishop Donald Coggan appointed Ingram Hill a Canon Residentiary, a full-time member of the Cathedral Chapter. He held this position until his retirement in 1983. He was noted for his enthusiasm in promoting community interest in the cathedral itself and the churches of the surrounding city and countryside, as well as his punctilious observance of all aspects of cathedral worship. He produced a number of studies and guidebooks in this period, including Christ's Glorious Church (1976), a popular guide to the cathedral, the New Bell's Guide to Canterbury Cathedral (1986), a more substantial work, and The Six Preachers of Canterbury Cathedral (1982), a history of the college. His work extended to radio broadcasts and interviews. However, he was perhaps best known for his constant work in welcoming visiting parties, initiating them into the mysteries of the cathedral, often by torch-light. His knowledge and commitment were recognised on retirement by the award of an honorary doctorate of divinity by the University of Kent and the granting of the freedom of the city of Canterbury.

== Later years ==
Ingram Hill's scholarly work and enthusiasms persisted after retirement, and he continued to worship regularly at the cathedral until near his death. He was able to expand his interest in music, in particular the cantatas of Johann Sebastian Bach. In 1998 the King's School commissioned John Ward to paint his portrait, which won the BP Portrait Award at the National Portrait Gallery.

== Personal life ==
Derek Ingram Hill was married to Violet, who died in 1998. They had a daughter, who died in 2002, and a son.
