= Hagai Netzer =

Israeli astrophysicist and Professor

- חגי נצר
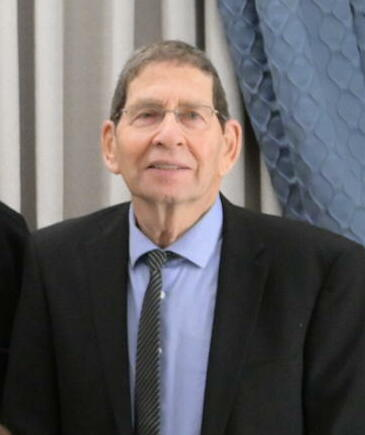
- Born: Israel
- Occupations: Astrophysicist and academic

Academic background
- Education: B.Sc., Physics; Ph.D., Astronomy
- Alma mater: Tel-Aviv University; Sussex University

Academic work
- Institutions: Tel-Aviv University

Hagai Netzer (Hebrew: חגי נצר; born 1945) is an Israeli astrophysicist and Professor Emeritus at Tel Aviv University, known for his research on quasars, active galactic nuclei (AGNs), Black hole, star-forming galaxies, and the interplay of gas and dust in the universe. He was awarded the Weizmann Prize in 2005 and is a Fellow of the Israel Physical Society as well as an associate of the Royal Astronomical Society. Moreover, he has authored five books on astronomy and science in Hebrew, three books in English, and more than 300 research papers in scientific journals.

Netzer's notable publications include The Crowded Cosmos: A Definitive Review of Intelligent Life Beyond Earth, a popular science book with Ami Ben Bassat, exploring intelligent life in the Milky Way and other galaxies, and The Physics and Evolution of Active Galactic Nuclei, a graduate-level textbook on the physics and evolution of active supermassive black holes and their host galaxies.

== Education ==
Netzer earned his Bachelor of Science degree in Physics from Tel Aviv University in 1972 and completed his Ph.D. in Astronomy at Sussex University in 1975.

== Career ==
Netzer joined Tel Aviv University in 1975, where he held academic and administrative roles over several decades. He served as the Jack Adler Chair of Extragalactic Astronomy from 1994 to 2011 and held University positions, including Chair of the Department of Astrophysics, Director of the Raymond and Beverly Sackler Institute of Astronomy, and Director of the Wise Observatory.

Since 2009, he has been Professor Emeritus at Tel Aviv University. Beyond academia, he has also contributed to national science education initiatives in Israel.

== Research contributions ==
Netzer's research has influenced the understanding of active galactic nuclei (AGNs)—galaxies hosting accreting supermassive black holes at their centers, often referred to as quasars.

=== AGN Emission Lines ===
Netzer's early observational and theoretical studies on the origin of the emission lines in AGN clarified several open questions, such as the physical conditions of the gas in the Broad Line Region (BLR) and the nature of low-ionization nuclear emission-line regions (LINERs).

=== AGN Variability Studies ===
Between 1989 and 2000, Netzer utilized the Wise Observatory's 1m telescope and space telescopes like the IUE and Hubble Space Telescope to investigate AGN variability. With his students, he demonstrated a strong correlation between the variable continuum luminosity and the time lags in emission-line responses to these variations. This work provided a foundation for measuring the masses of supermassive black holes.

=== Black Hole Mass Measurements ===
A 2000 study led by Netzer's group established a method for reliably measuring the masses of supermassive black holes using emission line lags in high-luminosity quasars. This method has become the standard technique for determining black hole masses in galaxies across the universe.

=== AGN-Galaxy Connection ===
Netzer focused on the relationship between active black holes and their host galaxies, particularly in star-forming galaxies and Ultraluminous Infrared Galaxies (ULIRGs). With his students and other collaborators, he initiated and led a study on the most luminous AGNs and star-forming galaxies in the early universe, about 1.2 billion years after the Big Bang.

=== Other research areas ===
Netzer has also contributed to topics such as AGN unification, the nature of post-starburst galaxies, and the causes of time-dependent continuum variations in AGNs. He demonstrated that observed lags in continuum variations were caused by diffuse gas emission in the BLR rather than irradiation from the central accretion disk.

=== Books ===
Netzer's 2013 textbook The Physics and Evolution of Active Galactic Nuclei, provides an exploration of AGNs, their structure, physics, and evolution.

== Books in English ==
- Active Galactic Nuclei (1990)
- The Physics and Evolution of Active Galactic Nuclei (2013) ISBN 9781107021518
- The Crowded Cosmos: A Definitive Review of Intelligent Life Beyond Earth (2023) ISBN 9798853316645 (with Ami Ben Bassat)
