= Richard Hodgson (cricketer) =

English clergyman, teacher, and sportsman

The Reverend Richard Greaves Hodgson (9 March 1845 – 1 November 1931) was an English clergyman, teacher and sportsman who played first-class cricket for Kent County Cricket Club.

Hodgson was born in Manchester in Lancashire on 9 March 1845, the second son of Edward Hodgson. He was educated at Manchester Grammar School and Christ Church, Oxford, graduating in 1867. With a mathematical training he joined the staff of The King's School, Canterbury in 1867, later becoming second master from 1871 to 1879 and the first Head master of the newly established King's Junior School from 1879 to 1908. He resigned from the Junior King's School in 1908 and was appointed Six Preacher at Canterbury Cathedral and was a member of the Cathedral Foundation for 60 years. Hodgson's Hall at King's School is named after him.

Hodgson was an all-round athlete who was over six feet tall and was described in his Wisden obituary as a "good average batsman". He played in three first-class matches for Kent, although without any real success, but played cricket regularly and scored 245 not out for the St. Lawrence Club in 1888. He was a member of the Kent Committee.

Hodgson had married Mary Latter in 1880. He died at his home in Canterbury on 1 November 1931 aged 87. His funeral took place in the Cathedral at Canterbury.

== Bibliography ==
- Carlaw, Derek (2020). Kent County Cricketers, A to Z: Part One (1806–1914) (PDF). Cardiff: ACS.
