= Greentown, Ohio =

- Census-designated place
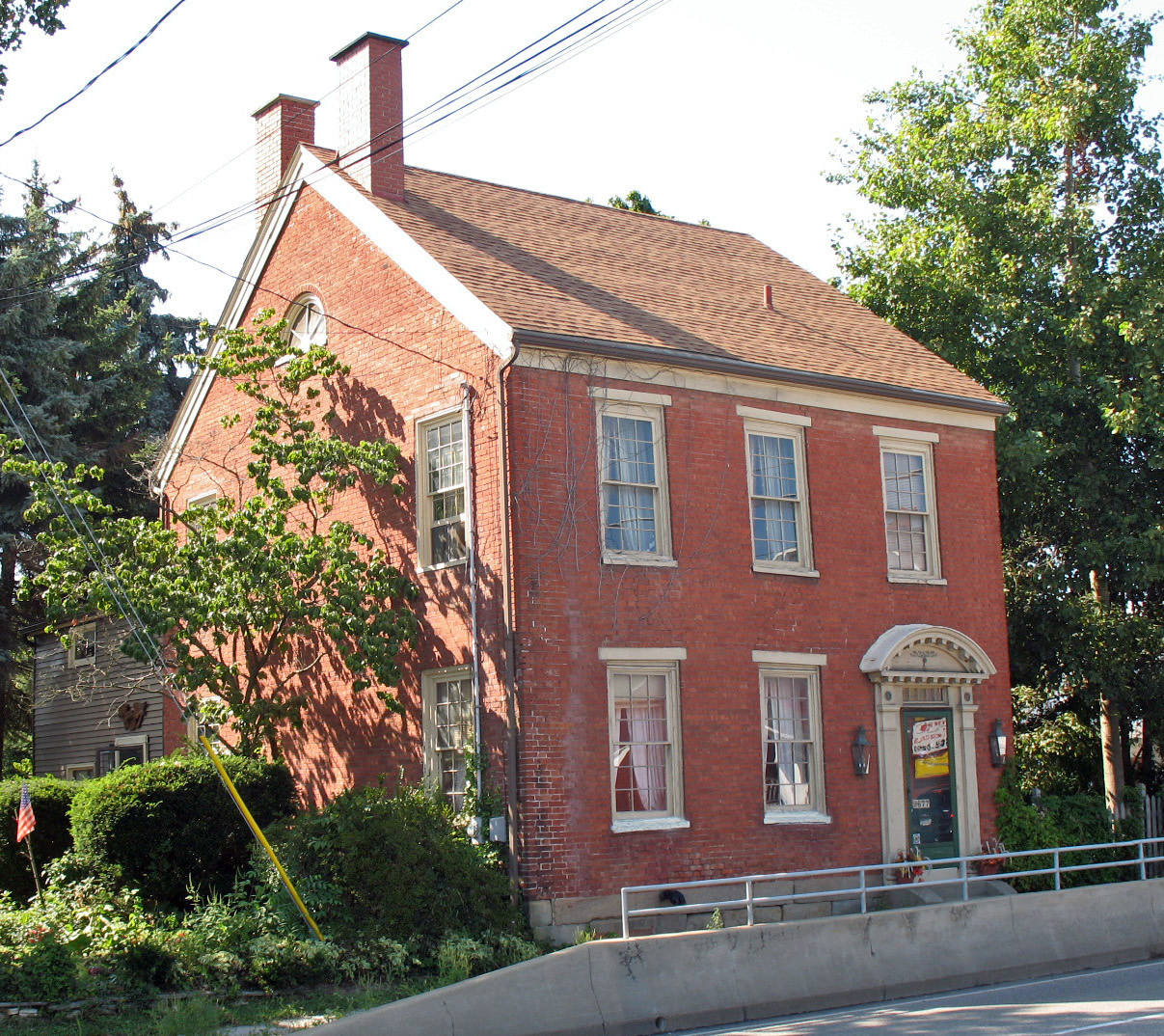
- The Miller House

- Location within Ohio Location within the United States
- Coordinates: 40°55′36″N 81°24′05″W
- Country: United States
- State: Ohio
- County: Stark
- Township: Lake

Area
  - Total: 2.55 sq mi (6.61 km^{2})
  - Land: 2.55 sq mi (6.61 km^{2})
  - Water: 0 sq mi (0.00 km^{2})
- Elevation: 1,198 ft (365 m)

Population (2020)
  - Total: 3,382
  - Density: 1,325.8/sq mi (511.91/km^{2})
- Time zone: UTC-5 (Eastern (EST))
  - Summer (DST): UTC-4 (EDT)
- ZIP code: 44630, 44720
- Area code: 330
- FIPS code: 39-32298
- GNIS feature ID: 2393030

Greentown is a census-designated place in northern Stark County, Ohio, United States. The population was 3,382 at the 2020 census. It is part of the Canton–Massillon metropolitan area.

== History ==
Greentown was platted in 1816. The community was formerly located in Green Township, hence the name.

== Geography ==
According to the United States Census Bureau, the CDP has a total area of 2.7 square miles (7.0 km^{2}), all land.

== Demographics ==
Historical population
Census	Pop.	Note	%±
2000	3,154		—
2010	3,804		20.6%
2020	3,382		−11.1%
U.S. Decennial Census

=== 2020 census ===
As of the 2020 census, Greentown had a population of 3,382. The median age was 40.2 years. 24.7% of residents were under the age of 18 and 15.4% of residents were 65 years of age or older. For every 100 females there were 101.2 males, and for every 100 females age 18 and over there were 102.6 males age 18 and over.

100.0% of residents lived in urban areas, while 0.0% lived in rural areas.

There were 1,217 households in Greentown, of which 32.8% had children under the age of 18 living in them. Of all households, 67.5% were married-couple households, 12.1% were households with a male householder and no spouse or partner present, and 15.7% were households with a female householder and no spouse or partner present. About 16.5% of all households were made up of individuals and 6.8% had someone living alone who was 65 years of age or older.

There were 1,261 housing units, of which 3.5% were vacant. The homeowner vacancy rate was 0.1% and the rental vacancy rate was 10.1%.

Racial composition as of the 2020 census
Race	Number	Percent
White	3,008	88.9%
Black or African American	53	1.6%
American Indian and Alaska Native	3	0.1%
Asian	61	1.8%
Native Hawaiian and Other Pacific Islander	0	0.0%
Some other race	36	1.1%
Two or more races	221	6.5%
Hispanic or Latino (of any race)	82	2.4%

=== 2010 census ===
As of the census of 2010, there were 3,804 people, 1,353 households, and 1,093 families residing in the CDP. The population density was 1,408.9 inhabitants per square mile (544.0/km^{2}). There were 1,398 housing units at an average density of 517.8 per square mile (199.9/km^{2}). The racial makeup of the CDP was 94.53% White, 1.55% African American, 0.18% Native American, 1.78% Asian, 0.50% from other races, and 1.44% from two or more races. Hispanic or Latino of any race were 1.63% of the population.

There were 1,353 households, out of which 38.3% had children under the age of 18 living with them, 69.9% were married couples living together, 7.6% had a female householder with no husband present, and 19.2% were non-families. 16.0% of all households were made up of individuals, and 5.1% had someone living alone who was 65 years of age or older. The average household size was 2.81 and the average family size was 3.15.

In the CDP the population was spread out, with 30.1% under the age of 19, 4.5% from 19 to 24, 25.4% from 25 to 44, 30.6% from 45 to 64, and 9.4% who were 65 years of age or older. The median age was 39.1 years. For every 100 females there were 98.7 males. For every 100 females age 18 and over, there were 98.1 males.

=== Income and poverty ===
The median income for a household in the CDP was $84,944, and the median income for a family was $101,414. Males had a median income of $63,307 versus $46,558 for females. The per capita income for the CDP was $31,148. About 3.4% of families and 4.6% of the population were below the poverty line, including none of those under age 18 and 13.2% of those age 65 or over.

== Education ==
Greentown is part of the North Canton City School District, which includes one elementary school, one intermediate school, one middle school and Hoover High School in North Canton. Formerly, the district operated Greentown Intermediate School in the village, which was sold in 2023.

== Notable people ==
- Andy Alleman, professional football player
- Lewis Miller, philanthropist
- Nina West, drag queen
- Frank C. Wise, politician
