= Peter Collins (slang) =

“Peter Collins” was a circus and theatrical colloquialism in British and American English of the late 19th and early 20th centuries, designating an imaginary or nonexistent person to whom a newcomer or beginner was sent on a silly errand as a kind of initiation (e.g., “Go ask Peter Collins for a left-handed screwdriver”). In underworld slang, it had the additional meaning of “nobody” or “no one”. In this latter sense, the term was the basis for the pen name “Peter Collinson” (i.e., Peter Collins's son) used at the very beginning of his writing career by Dashiell Hammett, who later authored The Maltese Falcon and other famous works.
