= Thomas Alexander Wise =

Dr Thomas Alexander Wise MD HEICS FRSE FRCS FRCPE (1802–1889) was a 19th-century Scottish physician, medical author, polymath and collector. He travelled in India, Tibet, China and Japan. He specialised in Tibetan maps and artefacts.

He was founder and first Principal of the Hooghly Mohsin College in 1834 and founder of the Hooghly Imambarah Hospital.

== Life ==
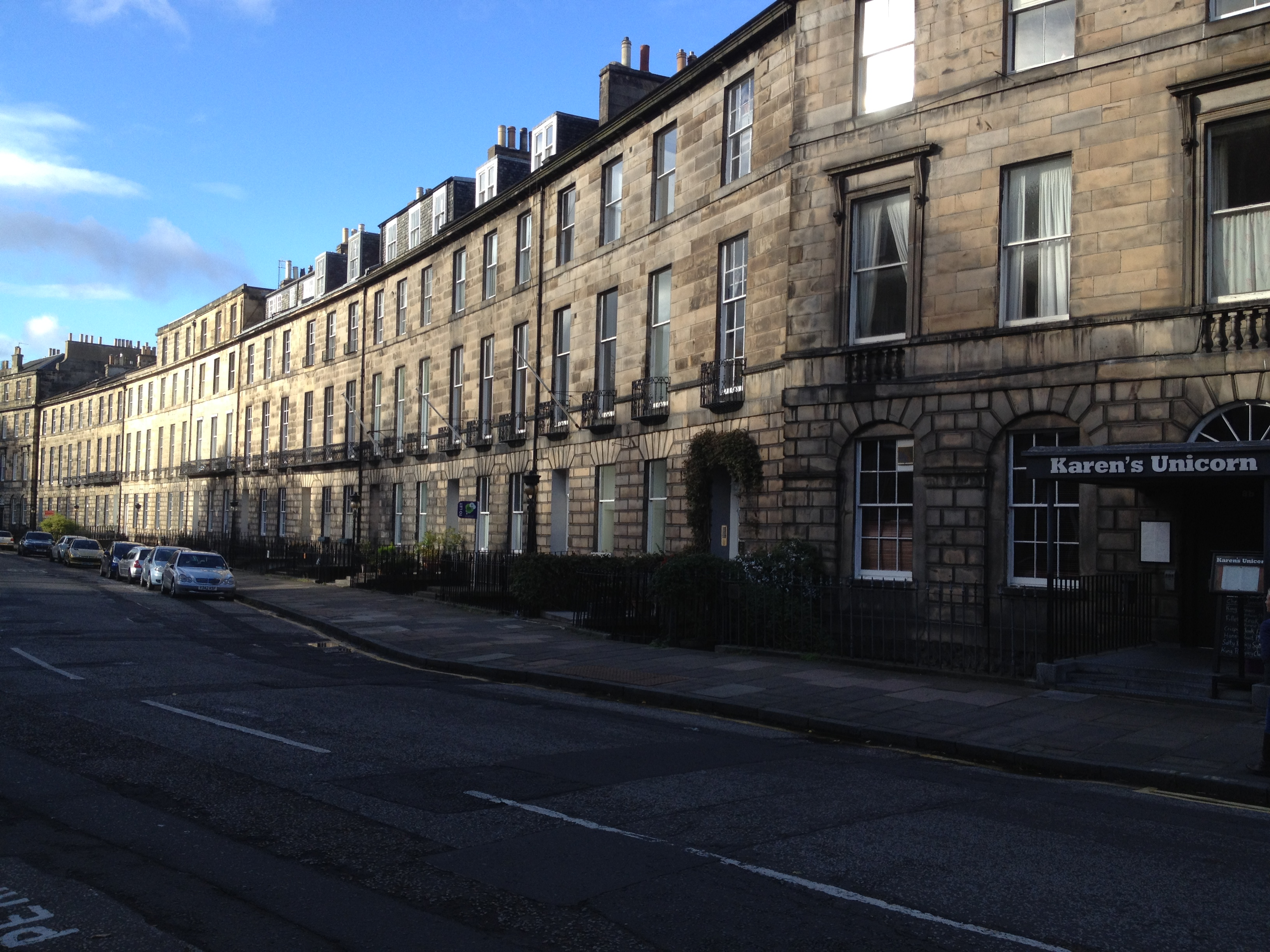
Abercromby Place in Edinburgh

He was born in or near Dundee on 13 June 1802 the second son of Thomas Wise of Hillbank in Forfarshire. His father had been a physician in Jamaica.

He studied medicine at Edinburgh University graduating MD in 1824. He went to India with the Indian Medical Service and worked first in Dum Dum. This brought him closer to his two brothers already in India: Josiah Patrick wise, a merchant, and an older brother serving in the East India Company.

He retired on health grounds in 1851 and returned to Scotland. In 1855 he was living at 17 Abercromby Place in Edinburgh's New Town. He also had property at Inchyra near Dundee.

In 1854 he was elected a Fellow of the Royal Society of Edinburgh. His proposer was John Hughes Bennett.

He later moved to London and died in Norwood in London on 23 July 1889. He is buried in West Norwood Cemetery.

== Publications ==
- Commentary of the Hindu System of Medicine (1845 republished 1860)
- Diseases of the Eye (1847)
- Practical Remarks on Insanity in Bengal (1852)
- Essay on the Pathology of the Blood (1858)
- Cholera, its Symptoms, Causes and Remedies (1864)
- the History of Medicine (1867)

== Memorials ==
A number of Wise's collections are held by the McManus Gallery in Dundee.

Thomas Wise Place near Ninewells Hospital in Dundee is named after him.

== Family ==
He married Emily Isabella Disney (1812–1839). She was the niece of Col Prendergast, auditor-general of Madras. She died young and is buried in the Dutch Cemetery in Chinsurah.

He secondly married Harriet Elizabeth Wise (1822–1881) who is buried with him.

His son James Wise was a surgeon in Dacca.
