= Natural Alternatives International =

Natural Alternatives International, Inc.
- Company type: Public
- Traded as: Nasdaq: NAII; Russell Microcap Index component
- Industry: Health
- Founded: 1980; 46 years ago
- Founder: Mark A. LeDoux
- Headquarters: Carlsbad, California, U.S.
- Number of employees: over 240
- Website: nai-online.com

Natural Alternatives International, Inc. (NAI) is an American company based in Carlsbad, California which manufactures nutritional supplements such as Juice Plus. NAI was founded in 1980 by Mark A. LeDoux, and had 241 employees in 2007. NAI's manufacturing facilities are located in Vista, California, Switzerland and Japan.

== Product Lines ==
NAI manufactures products sold by other companies such as National Safety Associates, Mannatech, NuSkin Enterprises, Jenny Craig, and Dr. Reginald Cherry. NAI previously held a multimillion-dollar contract with the U.S. Olympic Committee, which expired in March 1997.

NAI experienced a dramatic shift in its financial situation when NuSkin Enterprises, one of NAI’s largest customers, did not renew its manufacturing contract and began the process of transferring to another manufacturer. Sales subsequently declined 15.5% from $67.9 million USD in 1998, with a net profit of $5.9 million, to $57.4 million in 1999, with a net loss of $2.9 million.

== Juice Plus ==
One of their main products is Juice Plus, launched in 1993, which was brought up during the O. J. Simpson murder case in 1995, since O. J. Simpson was the product's chief spokesperson.

NAI manufactures Juice Plus products through an exclusive worldwide manufacturing agreement with National Safety Associates. During the fiscal year ended June 30, 2006, National Safety Associates accounted for approximately 38% of NAI's net sales.
