= John A. Wise =

John A. Wise, PhD (1939–2011), was an American scientist. He retired in 2010 as the chief science officer for Natural Alternatives International (NAI), a nutritional products manufacturer based in San Marcos, California, US. Earlier in his career, he was the vice-president of research and development for United Sciences of America, Inc. (USAI) until 1986. USAI was a multi-level marketing company in Dallas, Texas which went bankrupt after controversial marketing practices were revealed.

== Biography ==
Wise graduated with a B.S. in Preventative Medicine and a B.A. in Zoology from the University of Washington in 1963, as well as an M.S. in Microbiology from the University of Minnesota in 1967. He received his Ph.D. in Microbiology from Oregon State University in 1970.

== United Sciences of America ==
From 1982 to 1986, Wise was executive vice president of research and development for the nutritional supplement company United Sciences of America, Inc. (USAI) and was responsible for formulating the company's products. In October 1986, USAI was the subject of an exposé produced by NBC, which revealed the company's use of fraudulent scientific claims and deceptive advertising. The FDA subsequently investigated USAI for pyramid-scheming, the use of false and misleading promotional materials, and for making prohibited disease treatment claims. Attorneys General in California, New York and Texas simultaneously filed lawsuits ordering USAI to change its marketing plan and sales claims. In response, USAI filed for bankruptcy and ceased operations in 1987. USAI's deceptive sales and marketing tactics were reviewed in several articles published in 1986-1987.

== Natural Alternatives International ==
In 1987, Dr. Wise joined Natural Alternatives International (NAI) as the director of science and technology. He was appointed Vice President of Research and Development in 1992 and served as Chief Scientific Officer from 2002 until June 2007, at which time he retired as an officer, being retained by the company as a consultant. As Chief Scientific Officer, Wise was paid an annual salary in excess of $200,000. and as a consultant to NAI, he received compensation of $10,000 monthly. In mid-2006, shortly before the termination of his employment agreement with NAI, Wise owned 2.32% (182,340 shares) of the company's common stock. NAI manufactures a nutritional supplement known as Juice Plus+ for National Safety Associates. Several of the research articles published on Juice Plus were co-authored by Wise. Some of them received criticism as being poorly designed.

== Awards ==
In 2010, Wise received an Apple Award from the Council for Responsible Nutrition, a trade association/lobbying group representing the dietary supplement industry.
