= The Progressive Christian =

Magazine published by United Methodist Church

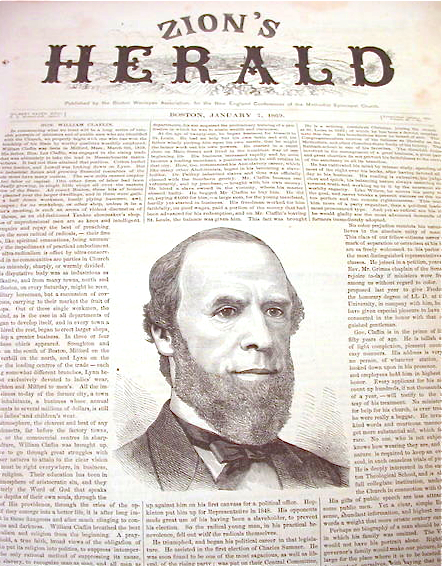
- Zion's Herald, 1869 (published by Boston Wesleyan Association)
- First issue: 1823
- Final issue: Fall/Winter 2011
- Company: TPC Publications
- Country: United States
- Based in: Dallas, Texas
- Language: English
- Website: tpcmagazine.org
- ISSN: 1934-7316

The Progressive Christian was an independent magazine and social community providing news, commentary, commentary, resources, discussion forums and multimedia for and about the Progressive Christian movement. It was published by TPC Publications, Inc., a Massachusetts-based non-profit religious publishing organization, and edited by Cynthia B. Astle. It was founded as Zion's Herald in 1823. Following its inception, it went by several names before assuming its final title in 2006:

- Zion's Herald (1823–1828), published in Boston, was the first weekly Methodist publication in America, though not an official publication of the church
- Christian Advocate and Journal and Zion's Herald (1828–1833), published in New York after merging with the Christian Advocate and Journal, which in 1828 was said to have the highest circulation of any paper in the world
- Zion's Herald (1833–1840), after acquisition by the Boston Wesleyan Association and replacing the New England Christian Herald
- Zion's Herald and Wesleyan Journal (1842–1867)
- Zion's Herald (1868 – c. 2003–2006)
- The Progressive Christian (c. 2006–2011)

As Zion's Herald, it was published as an insert in the Southern New England Reporter from 1979 to 1992. It returned to being published on its own from 1992 to 1996, with the United Methodist Review included as an insert. From 1997 to 1998, it was published as a section of the Cross Currents news magazine before resuming publication in 2000 as an independent magazine and changing its name in 2006 to The Progressive Christian. The name change was suggested by a marketing consultant to attract more readers and subscribership grew 50% in the following year.

The Zion's Herald was founded by a group of lay Methodists to be a journal "devoted to religion and moral subjects". After it was acquired by the Boston Wesleyan Association its editorial stance was one of "boldness and outspokenness on questions which agitate the public mind." When in 1844 the Methodist Episcopal Church separated into northern and southern conferences, the Zion's Herald was the only northern Methodist paper that did not condemn abolitionism, having in 1836 opened its pages to discussion of slavery while not itself taking a stand. In 1851, the Zion's Herald was considered one of the leading papers of the Methodist church, and described by the Buffalo Christian Advocate as, along with another paper, "the radical organs of the church, ... ably conducted, and by sound and discriminating men."

In April 2008, the Associated Church Press, North America's oldest religious journalism association, recognized The Progressive Christian print magazine with its Award of Excellence as the Best General Interest Magazine in its class (which includes, among other notable publications, Christian Century and Sojourners). In 2009 the ACP awarded it third place.

The magazine closed on January 1, 2012.

== Notable people ==
- Daniel Wise (author), editor from 1852 to 1856

== See also ==
- Christian Advocate
