= John Wise (sport shooter) =

Australian sports shooter

Personal information
- Born: 25 February 1901
- Died: 12 May 1971 (aged 70)

Sport
- Sport: Sports shooting

John Wise (26 February 1901 – 12 May 1971) was an Australian sports shooter. He competed in the 300 m rifle event at the 1948 Summer Olympics.
