= George S. Wise =

- ג'ורג' וייז
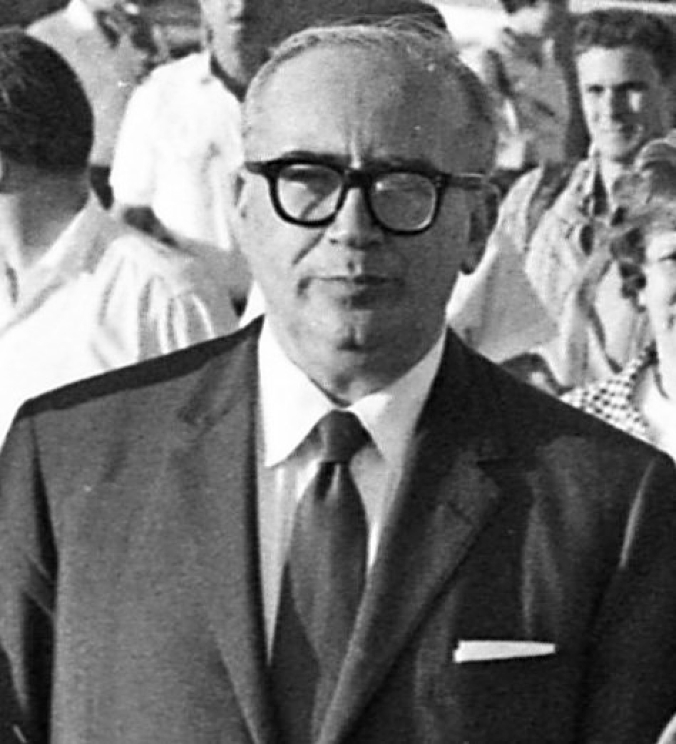
- Wise, 1969
- Born: George Schneiweis; April 6, 1906; Pinsk, White Russia, Russian Empire
- Died: July 2, 1987 (aged 81); Miami Beach, Florida, U.S.
- Education: Furman University; Columbia University
- Occupation: Sociologist
- Spouse: Florence Rosenberg

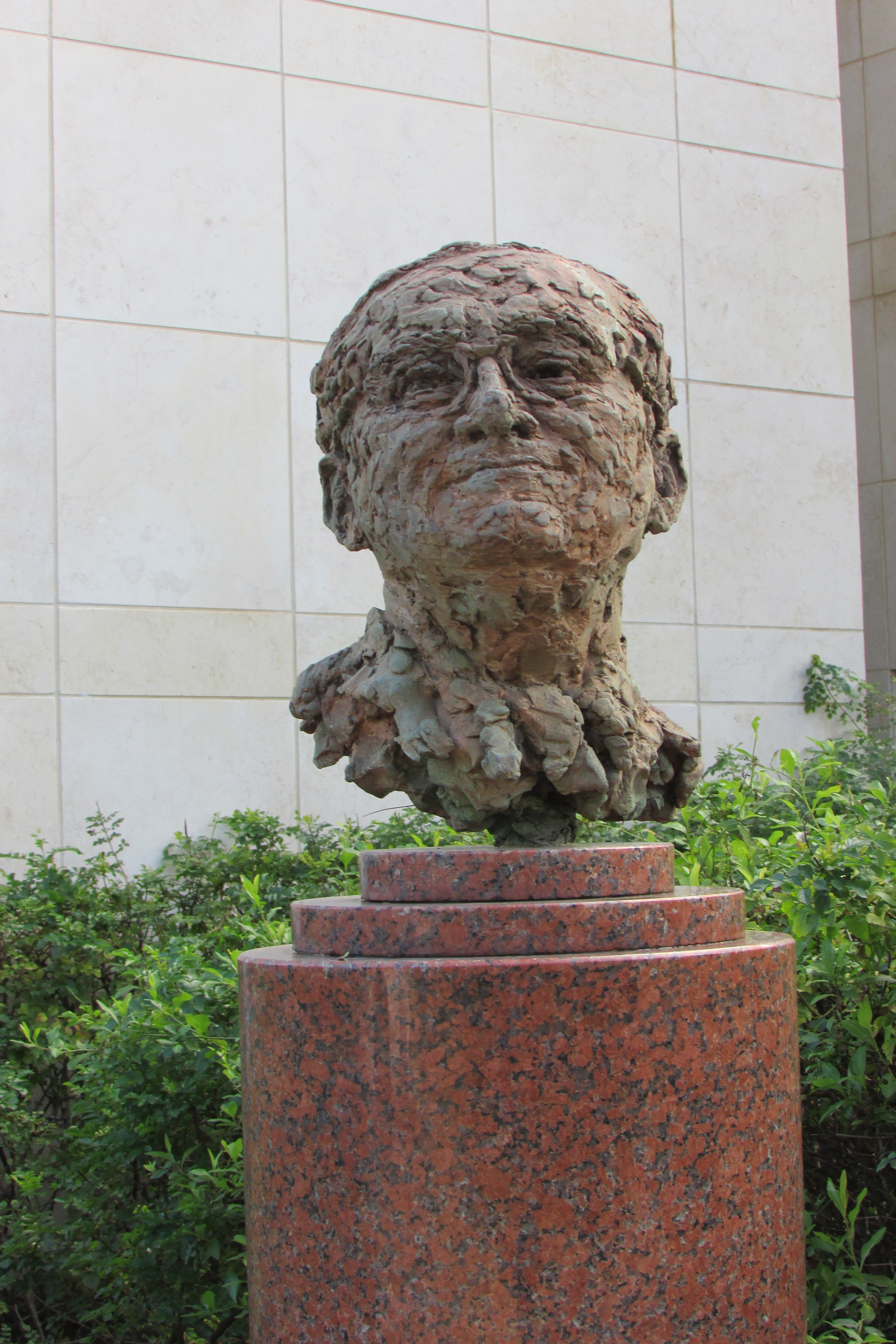
Bust of George S. Wise at Tel Aviv University

George Schneiweis Wise (Hebrew: ג'ורג' וייז; April 6, 1906 – July 2, 1987) was an American sociologist who served as the first president of Tel Aviv University in Ramat Aviv, Israel from 1963 to 1971.

== Early life ==
George Schneiweis (later Wise) was born in Pinsk, White Russia, Russian Empire in 1906. He emigrated to the United States in 1926. He graduated from Furman University in 1928 and got his advanced studies at Columbia University.

== Career ==
Wise taught Sociology at Columbia in 1930, a post he held until 1952. He became internationally known as an expert in Latin American and Israeli affairs, with a particular focus on caudillo dictatorships that were common in Latin American politics at the time. In 1951 he wrote a biography of Antonio Guzmán Blanco, the former dictator of Venezuela which was published by Columbia University Press.

A known Zionist, he was chairman of the board for the Jewish Telegraphic Agency. In 1951, he was named president of the American Friends of the Hebrew University of Jerusalem. In 1953, he was elected the head of the Hebrew University Board of Governors. As head, Wise led a major expansion program of the University, and still held the honor of "chancellor for life" at the time of his death.

He became the first president of Tel Aviv University in 1963, serving as such until 1971, when he was succeeded by Yuval Ne'eman.

Wise was also director of the Center for Advanced International Studies and a member of the board of governors for the University of Miami.

Wise was the owner of George S. Wise and Co. and the Inter-American Paper Corp., both newsprint manufacturers. According to the Los Angeles Times, he built the "first newsprint plant" in Mexico.

== Philanthropy ==
As a philanthropist, Wise worked on fighting illiteracy in Mexico by founding 30 schools, which led the Mexican government to honor Wise with the Order of the Aztec Eagle, the highest award given to a foreigner in 1949.

== Personal life, death, and legacy ==
Wise married Florence Rosenberg, who died on January 11, 2013, at the age of a hundred. He died in Miami Beach, Florida, on July 2, 1987, after suffering from heart failure for several months.

Upon hearing of his death, former Prime Minister of Israel Menachem Begin described Wise as "the dearest man I ever met". The Wise Observatory and the George S. Wise Faculty of Life Sciences at Tel Aviv University is named after Wise.
