= Mike Wise (columnist) =

American sports columnist (1964–2026)

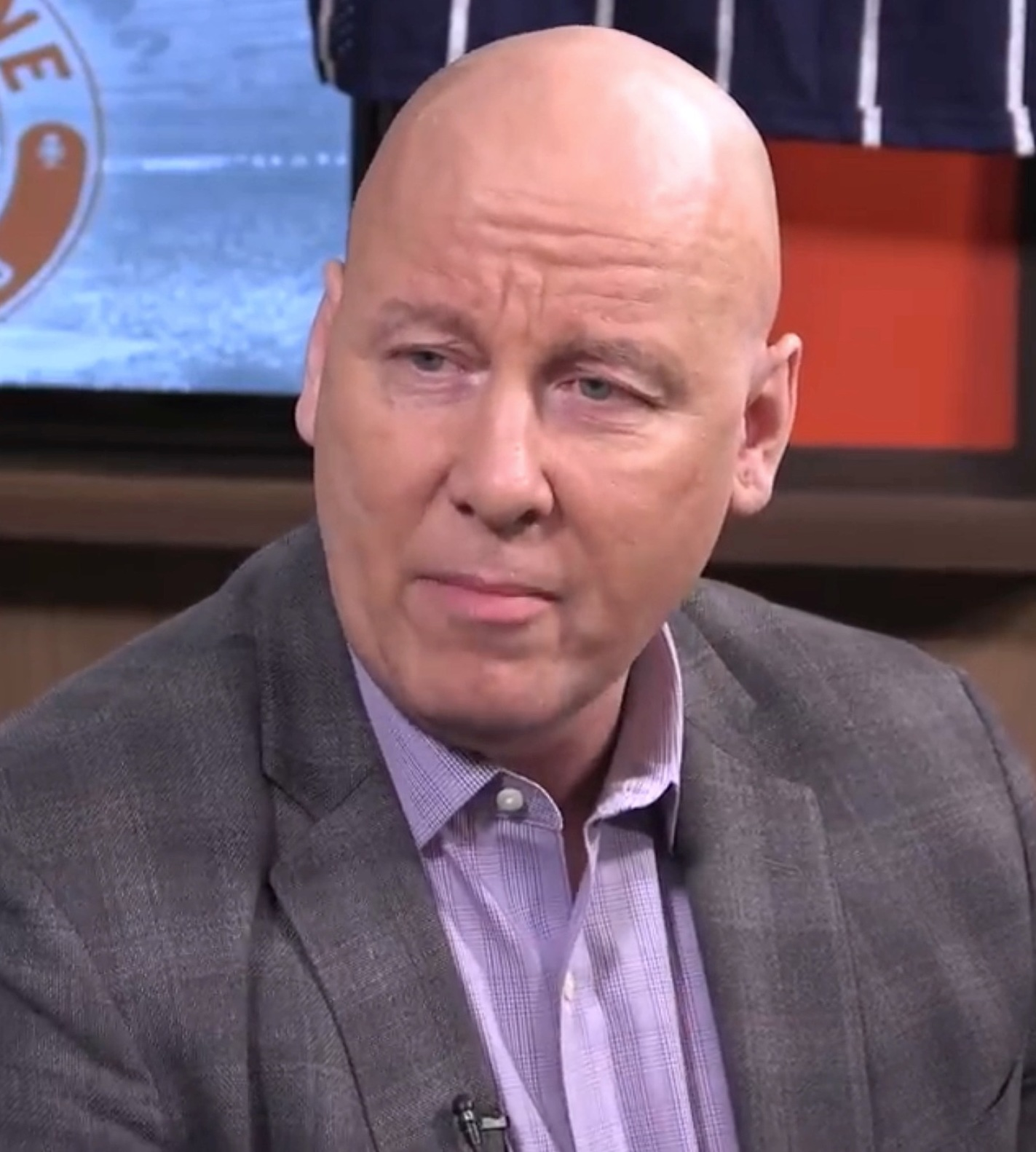
- Wise in 2018
- Born: January 2, 1964; Napa, California, U.S.
- Died: November 14, 2026 (aged 62); Panama City, Panama
- Occupation: Columnist
- Writing career
- Language: English
- Genres: Journalism; sports

Mike Wise (January 2, 1964 – November 14, 2026) was an American sports columnist, feature writer and sports television personality. He was a senior writer for The Undefeated, a digital property of ESPN intersecting sports, race and culture, and before ESPN worked for a combined 21 years at The New York Times and The Washington Post.

== Career ==
Wise was an award-winning sports columnist with The Washington Post from May 2004 to December 2014. In November 2014 he was plucked by ESPN to be a prominent voice and feature writer for The Undefeated, the network's new digital venture. He wrote the NBA column, covered the Knicks and four Olympics for The New York Times from 1994 to 2004. In addition, from 2009 to December 2012, Wise also hosted "The Mike Wise Show" on WJFK-FM.

He is best known for writing about social issues in sports, including his outspoken advocacy against Native American mascots, especially the Washington Redskins, his basketball coverage, his portraits of athletes and their psychological pasts, and his personal revelation of childhood sexual abuse in relation to the Penn State scandal.

At the Post, the Times and ESPN, he has covered the NBA Finals, World Series, multiple Super Bowls, an America's Cup in New Zealand and seven Olympic Games.

During an August 2010 segment on his radio show, Wise delivered an inaccurate report about Pittsburgh Steelers quarterback Ben Roethlisberger on Twitter. Wise defended his actions by claiming that he was attempting to mock the lack of sourcing and fact-checking in modern journalism. Because he had used his Washington Post Twitter account, the Post suspended him for a month.

== Other media ==
Wise was the co-author of two books: 2001's Shaq Talks Back, with Shaquille O'Neal, a New York Times bestseller; and 1999's Just Ballin' – the Chaotic Rise of the New York Knicks, with New York Daily News reporter Frank Isola. His national television appearances included CNN, MSNBC, PBS NewsHour, SportsCenter, Outside the Lines, The Today Show and Good Morning America.

== Personal life and death ==
Wise was raised in Northern California and Hawaii and was a graduate of California State University, Fresno.

In January 2008, Wise and his dog were running along a frozen canal in Georgetown when his dog fell through the ice. Wise also fell through the ice trying to save his dog and would have died if a stranger had not pulled him out. Wise later found the person, a George Washington University Law School student named Jason Coates, and wrote a story about their experiences in The Washington Post Magazine.

Wise's second cousin is David Wise who is a two-time Winter Olympic gold medalist in men's freestyle skiing on the halfpipe.

He was the son of Roger Wise, who covered the nation's first heart transplant for the San Jose Mercury News, later became an editor for the Honolulu Star-Bulletin and an Episcopal priest before his death in 2013.

Mike Wise died on November 14, 2026, at the age of 62.

== Selected awards ==
Wise won the 2006 Associated Press Sports Writers first-place Feature Story Award for a portrait of NBA All-Star Gilbert Arenas and the mother who abandoned him. He also won the 2009 Associated Press Sports Writers first-place Feature Story Award for a profile of hockey enforcer Donald Brashear.
