= David Wise (cricketer) =

English cricketer (born 1963)

Personal information
- Full name: David Arthur James Wise
- Born: 21 January 1962 (age 64); Tiddington, Oxfordshire, England
- Batting: Right-handed
- Bowling: Right-arm medium

Domestic team information
- Years: Team
- 1983–1996: Oxfordshire

Career statistics
| Competition | List A |
|---|---|
| Matches | 7 |
| Runs scored | 104 |
| Batting average | 20.80 |
| 100s/50s | –/1 |
| Top score | 68 |
| Balls bowled | – |
| Wickets | – |
| Bowling average | – |
| 5 wickets in innings | – |
| 10 wickets in match | – |
| Best bowling | – |
| Catches/stumpings | 1/– |
- Source: Cricinfo, 20 May 2011

David Arthur James Wise (born 23 March 1963) is a former English cricketer. Wise was a right-handed batsman who bowled right-arm medium pace. He was born in Tiddington, Oxfordshire.

Wise made his debut for Oxfordshire in the 1983 Minor Counties Championship against Berkshire. Hale played Minor counties cricket for Oxfordshire from 1983 to 1996, which included 78 Minor Counties Championship matches and 17 MCCA Knockout Trophy matches. He made his List A debut against Essex in the 1985 NatWest Trophy. He played 6 further List A matches, the last coming against Glamorgan in the 1993 NatWest Trophy. In his 7 List A matches, he scored 104 runs at a batting average of 28.80, with a high score of 68. This came against Glamorgan in his final List A match, with his innings being ended by Roland Lefebvre.

He has also played Second XI cricket for the Worcestershire Second XI in 1985. He stood in a women's cricket List A match in 2005 between Berkshire Women and Somerset Women.
