= Daniel Wise (author) =

American writer (1813–1898)

Daniel Wise (1813-1898) was an English-American Methodist Episcopal clerical author. Originally hailing from Portsmouth, England, he immigrated to the United States in 1833. He would become a pastor in 1837, a role he remained in until 1852. He would then work as an editor of Zion's Herald and Wesleyan Journal (later known as The Progressive Christian), between 1852-1856. He later worked as the corresponding secretary of the Sunday School Union and Tract Society of his church between 1856-1872. Part of his duty as secretary was to edit all the publications of the society. From 1872 onwards, he was occupied with literary work. He published more than 40 books throughout his lifetime, including:

- Christian Love: or Charity An Essential Element of True Christian Character (1847)
- The Path of Life (1847)
- Precious Lessons from the Lips of Jesus (1854)
- The Saintly and Successful Worker (1879)
- Heroic Methodists of the Olden Time (1882)
- Our Missionary Heroes and Heroines (1884)
- Young Knights of the Cross (1887)
- Faith, Hope, Love, and Duty (1891)
- Bridal Greetings: A Marriage Gift, In Which the Mutual Duties of Husband and Wife are Familiarly Illustrated and Enforced (1850)
