= George Wise (rugby union) =

- Born: George Denis Wise; 12 May 1904 Dunedin, New Zealand
- Died: 1 September 1971 (aged 67) Dunedin, New Zealand
- Height: 1.78 m (5 ft 10 in)
- Weight: 72 kg (159 lb)
- School: Otago Boys' High School

Rugby union career
- Position: Wing
Provincial / State sides
Years	Team	Apps	(Points)
1923–25	Otago	12	
1928	North Otago	2	
International career
Years	Team	Apps	(Points)
1925	New Zealand	0	(0)

George Denis Wise (12 May 1904 – 1 September 1971) was a New Zealand rugby union player. A wing three-quarter, Wise represented Otago and North Otago at a provincial level, and was a member of the New Zealand national side, the All Blacks, in 1925. He played seven matches for the All Blacks, scoring five tries, but did not appear in any internationals.
