= United Sciences of America =

Defunct American multi-level marketing company

United Sciences of America, Inc.
- Defunct: 1987
- Fate: Bankruptcy
- Headquarters: Carrollton, Texas, United States

United Sciences of America, Inc. (also known as USA) was an American company that was accused of fraud and shut down in the late 1980s. USA manufactured nutritional supplements such as "Master Formula", "Calorie Control Formula", "Fiber Energy Bar", and "Formula Plus", distributing them via multi-level marketing (a.k.a. pyramid marketing). The company experienced rapid growth in the 1980s, was heavily endorsed and marketed by various celebrities, and was marketed via over 140,000 distributors. However, an exposé by NBC revealed fraudulent practices, and this was followed by multiple lawsuits from attorneys general in three different states. Several of the company's advisors resigned, and USA declared bankruptcy in 1987.

== Background ==
The company was based in Carrollton, Texas, and chaired by Robert "Bobby" Adler (not the same person as, and not related to Robert Adler), with president Jerris Leonard, who had been a former U.S. assistant attorney general under Richard Nixon. Products were marketed with claims such as that they helped prevent cancer, AIDS, arthritis, alcoholism and heart disease.

Receiving endorsements from several celebrities, including William Shatner, Chris Evert, and Gary Carter, the company experienced rapid growth in January 1986. It had a team of 140,000 distributors, with new distributors signing on at a rate of over 10,000 per month. The company was earning US$8 million, and company executives were projecting sales over $100 million in 1986 along with the astounding prediction of US$1 billion by 1989. Prospective distributors were issued a videotape narrated by Star Trek star William Shatner, with an elaborate sales pitch that both promoted the product, and implied that the modern world with its modern technology had "a deadly price tag" such as toxic chemicals and nuclear waste. The tape promoted USA chairman Robert Adler as a visionary out to change the world. Another tape was targeted towards athletes, and was narrated by Chris Evert, with other athletes such as Bill Rodgers and Gary Carter stating that USA could help distributors to achieve financial security.

USA had a 16-member executive advisory board including notable scientists such as Michael DeBakey and Dr. Alexander Leaf, but these members were paid consulting fees ranging from $5,000 to $20,000, and/or received research grants from the company which could be worth $50,000 to $100,000.

== Fraud ==
In October 1986, USA was the subject of an exposé produced by the NBC network, which revealed the company's use of fraudulent scientific claims and deceptive advertising. In November, the company failed to mail some of its commissions, and by December, the company's checks to distributors were bouncing.

The FDA subsequently investigated USA for pyramid-scheming, the use of false and misleading promotional materials, and for making prohibited disease treatment claims. On January 28, 1987 attorneys general in California, New York and Texas simultaneously filed lawsuits ordering USA to change its marketing plan and sales claims. Several of the board's advisory members immediately resigned, including Leaf and DeBakey. A few others said that they were "misquoted or improperly used in USA's sales materials." Leaf told Money magazine, "They used my name with false statements to advertise the products." In February 1987, company executives told the FDA that they were going to make labeling changes and bring everything into compliance, but in April USA filed for Chapter 7 bankruptcy liquidation and ceased operation. USA's deceptive sales and marketing tactics were reviewed in several articles published in 1986-1987.

== See also ==
- John A. Wise, USA scientist
