= John Henry Wise =

American politician

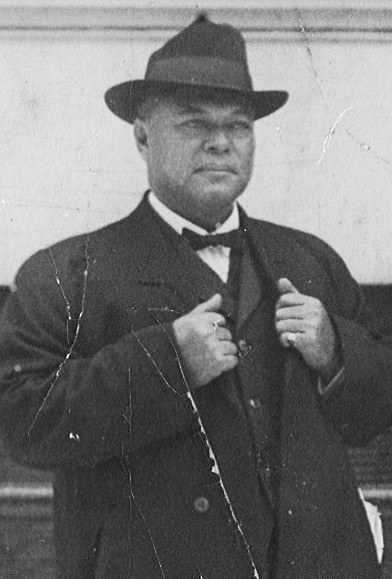
- Senator Wise in 1920

Member of the Territory of Hawaii Senate for the Third District
- In office 1919–1921

Personal details
- Born: July 19, 1868 Kapaʻau, Kohala, Hawaii, Kingdom of Hawaii
- Died: August 12, 1937 (aged 69) Honolulu, Oahu, Territory of Hawaii
- Resting place: Kawaiahaʻo Church
- Party: Republican; Democratic
- Spouse(s): Lois Kawai; Edith McDowell
- Children: 10
- Education: Oberlin College
- Occupation: businessman, politician, pastor, educator

John Henry Wise (July 19, 1868 – August 12, 1937) was a Native Hawaiian politician, businessman, religious leader, and educator of Hawaii. In his youth, he became the first Native Hawaiian to play college football. While he attended theology school at Oberlin College, Wise had played for the Oberlin Yeomen football team. During his political career in the Hawaii Territorial Legislature, he helped pass the Hawaiian Homelands Act of 1921. In later life, he served as an instructor of Hawaiian language at the Kamehameha Schools and the University of Hawaii.

== Early life ==
He was born July 19, 1868, at Kapaʻau, Kohala, on the island of Hawaii. His parents were Julius A. Wise, a German settler from Hamburg, and Rebecca Nāwaʻa, a Native Hawaiian. He was educated at the Hilo Boarding School and became a part of the inaugural class of the Kamehameha School for Boys where he played left field for the Kamehameha Nine baseball team.

=== Oberlin College ===
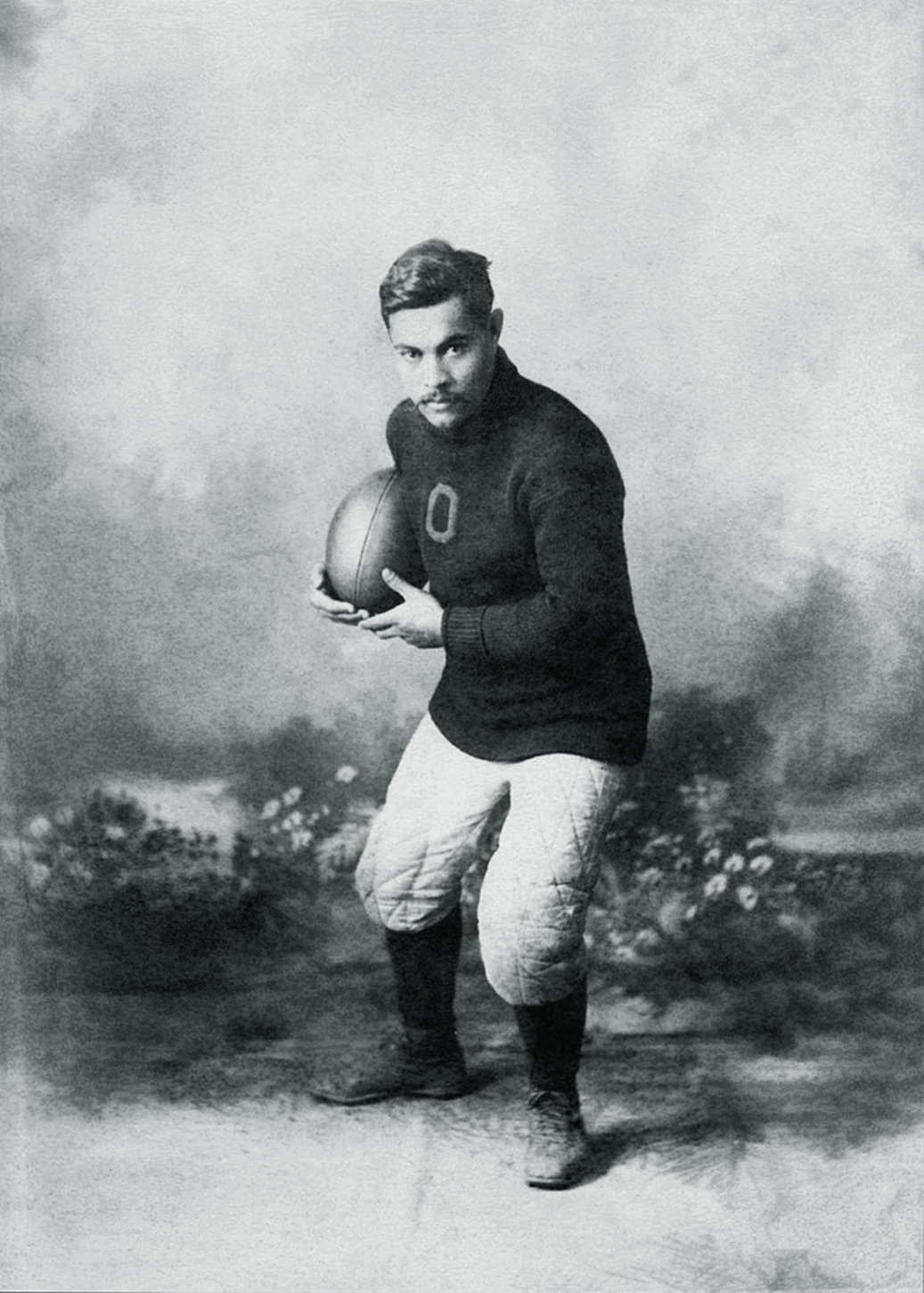
Wise in his football uniform at Oberlin College.

From 1890 to 1893, he attended theology school at Oberlin College where he became the first Native Hawaiian to play college football, on the college's first football team. Coach John Heisman found him in searching for a guard. He was considered the team's best lineman. Wise also played at fullback, and scored a touchdown in the close loss to Michigan in 1892. Noted for his immense strength, he was reportedly "able to run with three men on his back without noticing the extra weight".

== Career in Hawaii ==
After graduating school, he returned home in June 1893. The monarchy under Queen Liliuokalani had been overthrown and a new Provisional Government (later the Republic of Hawaii) had taken its place. The Hawaiian Evangelical Association which had funded Wise's continental education supported the anti-monarchists while Wise became a Royalist. He worked for a time as pastor of Ka Makua Mau Loa Church. In January 1895, he took part in the unsuccessful counter-revolution led by Robert William Wilcox against the Republic of Hawaii. Wise was arrested and tried for misprision of treason. On his February 5 trial, he pled guilty to the charges, refused to give evidence against other conspirators and was sentenced to three years in jail. Among the last group of political prisoners released, he was pardoned the following year by President Sanford B. Dole.

After the annexation of Hawaii to United States, Wise became a founding member of the Democratic Party of Hawaii and served as a delegate, with former Hawaiian royal Prince David Kawānanakoa, to the 1900 Democratic National Convention in Kansas City, Missouri, in which William Jennings Bryan was nominated. He supported the Democrats because of the association of the party with President Grover Cleveland who had sympathized with the Royalist cause in 1893. Wise worked as a Hawaiian language interpreter for the 1901 inaugural Hawaii Territorial Legislature, established after the Hawaiian Organic Act.

Wise switched party lines, becoming a member of the Republican Party of Hawaii in 1905, and attended the 1912 Republican National Convention. He served on the Hawaii Territorial Legislature as a clerk on the House of Representatives and the Hawaii Territorial Senate for multiple years. In 1919, he was elected and served a four-year term Senator from the Third District. He joined Prince Jonah Kūhiō Kalanianaʻole, the Congressional delegate from Hawaii, in support of the passage of the Homelands Act of 1921. Despite Wise's and Kūhiō's wishes, the Act contained high blood-quantum requirements, and leased land instead of granting it fee-simple, creating a perpetual government institution. In between his political career, he worked as a contractor on the island of Hawaii and helped translated Hawaiian legends for the Bishop Museum. In December 1923, President Calvin Coolidge appointed Wise as director of prohibition enforcement during the prohibition era.

He retired from politics in 1925 and briefly lived on Molokai, farming taro and raising pigs. In 1926, Wise began teaching Hawaiian language at Kamehameha Schools and later at the University of Hawaii, becoming the second professor of Hawaiian language after Frederick William Beckley. He taught until 1934. During this period, he and Kamehameha Schools president Frank Midkiff co-authored a Hawaiian language textbook, A First Course in Hawaiian Language. He also helped revitalized Hawaiian culture through his membership in Hawaiian civic organizations such as the Royal Order of Kamehameha I and the Hawaiian Civic Clubs, both which he helped Prince Kūhiō reorganize or founded, and the Hale O Nā Aliʻi O Hawaiʻi.

== Death and legacy ==
On December 20, 1897, he married Lois Kawai (1882–1919) at Waimea. They had ten children: Muriel (Lyons), Lois, Rebecca (Boozer), William, Ella (Harrison), Nani, John Henry Jr., Jonah Kuhio, Daniel, and Tepa. In 1920, he married Edith McDowell, a newspaper correspondent he met in Washington, DC.

He died on August 12, 1937, of pneumonia, and was buried at the Oahu Cemetery. After his death, the University of Hawaii renamed the school's athletic field John Henry Wise Field in his honor. The field was renamed to Bachman Lawn at a later date; it now is situated at the corner of Dole Street and University Avenue near an amphitheater. In 2012, Ronald William, Jr. wrote To Raise a Voice in Praise: The Revivalist Mission of John Henry Wise, 1889–1896 about the early periods of Wise's life.

== Bibliography ==
- Blodgett, Geoffrey (2006). Oberlin History: Essays and Impressions. Kent, OH: Kent State University Press. ISBN 978-0-87338-887-0. OCLC 67727880.
- Brandt, Nat (2001). When Oberlin was King of the Gridiron: The Heisman Years. Kent, OH: Kent State University Press. ISBN 978-0-87338-684-5. OCLC 44573346.
- Day, Arthur Grove (1984). History Makers of Hawaii: a Biographical Dictionary. Honolulu: Mutual Publishing of Honolulu. ISBN 978-0-935180-09-1. OCLC 11087565.
- Dudoit, D. Mähealani, ed. (2002). ʻÖiwi: A Native Hawaiian Journal. Vol. 2. Honolulu: Kuleana ʻÖiwi Press. ISBN 0-9668220-2-1. OCLC 402770968.
- Hawaii (1918). Lydecker, Robert Colfax (ed.). Roster Legislatures of Hawaii, 1841–1918. Honolulu: Hawaiian Gazette Company. OCLC 60737418.
- Heisman, John M; Schlabach, Mark (2012). Heisman: The Man Behind the Trophy. New York: Howard Books. ISBN 978-1-4516-8291-5. OCLC 779266023.
- Musick, John Roy (1898). Hawaii; Our New Possessions an Account of Travels and Adventure, with Sketches of the Scenery, Customs and Manners, Mythology and History of Hawaii to the Present. New York: Funk and Wagnalls Company. OCLC 21791732.
- Van Dyke, Jon M. (2008). Who Owns the Crown Lands of Hawaiʻi?. Honolulu: University of Hawaii Press. ISBN 978-0-8248-6560-3. OCLC 257449971.
- Williams, Ronald Jr. (2015). "Race, Power, and the Dilemma of Democracy: Hawaiʻi's First Territorial Legislature, 1901". The Hawaiian Journal of History. 49. Honolulu: Hawaiian Historical Society: 1–45. doi:10.1353/hjh.2015.0017. hdl:10524/56604. OCLC 60626541. S2CID 155592084 – via Project MUSE.
- Williams, Ronald Jr. (2012). "To Raise a Voice in Praise: The Revivalist Mission of John Henry Wise, 1889–1896". The Hawaiian Journal of History. 46. Honolulu: Hawaiian Historical Society: 1–35. hdl:10524/33792. OCLC 60626541.
