= Thomas Wise (priest) =

Thomas Wise D.D. (1670/71–1726) was an eighteenth-century clergyman of the Church of England.

== Life ==
He was born at Drayton, Vale of White Horse, the son of John Wise from Dorchester, Oxfordshire. He was educated at Exeter College, Oxford, where he was fellow 1694–1726.

He became rector of St Alphege Church, Canterbury (1709), vicar of Bekesbourne (1711), Six Preacher of Canterbury Cathedral (1711), prebendary of Lincoln Cathedral (1720), and was chaplain to the Princess of Wales (1721) and the Duke of Ormonde.

== Works ==
In 1706 he published an abridgement of Ralph Cudworth's Intellectual System. In 1711 he published The Christian Eucharist Rightly Stated.

A volume of Fourteen Discourses was published by W. Taylor in 1717.
