= George D. Wise (general) =

George Douglas Wise (December 31, 1816 – March 18, 1881) was a Union Army officer during the American Civil War.

Born in Brooklyn, New York, he was a United States Coast Survey employee before the war. He was the second cousin of politician and Confederate general Henry A. Wise.

On September 21, 1861, Wise was appointed captain as an assistant quartermaster. For the next years he served in the Western Gunboat Flotilla. In 1864 he was appointed Chief of the Ocean and Lake Transportation Division of the Quartermaster Department. He was promoted to colonel on August 2, 1864.

Wise received appointments to the brevet grades of major, lieutenant colonel and colonel, all to rank from March 13, 1865. On January 13, 1866, President Andrew Johnson nominated Wise for appointment to the grade of brevet brigadier general of volunteers, to rank from March 13, 1865, and the United States Senate confirmed the appointment on March 12, 1866. Wise was mustered out of the volunteers on October 1, 1867.

Wise died March 18, 1881, in Binghamton, New York. He was buried in Green Mount Cemetery, Baltimore, Maryland.

== See also ==
- List of American Civil War brevet generals (Union)
