= John Wise (Virginia politician) =

American politician

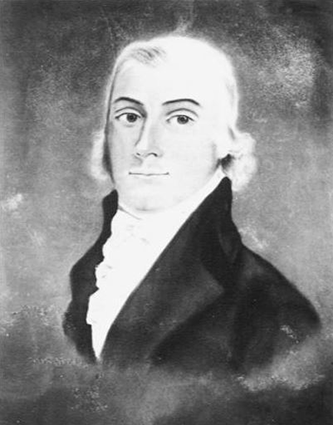

Speaker of the Virginia House of Delegates
- In office 1794–1799
- Preceded by: Thomas Mathews
- Succeeded by: Larkin Smith

Personal details
- Born: Before 1768 Accomack County, Virginia
- Died: March 30, 1812 Accomack County, Virginia
- Spouses: Mary Henry (m. 1788; died 1796) Sarah Corbin Cropper (m. 1799)
- Children: Henry A. Wise

Coat of Arms of John Wise

John Wise (before 1768 – 1812) was a Virginia politician. He represented Accomack County in the Virginia House of Delegates, and served as that body's Speaker from 1794 until 1799.
