= John Wise (footballer) =

Australian rules footballer

Personal information
- Full name: John Wise
- Born: 19 March 1954 (age 72)
- Original team: Heidelberg
- Height: 170 cm (5 ft 7 in)
- Weight: 67 kg (148 lb)

Playing career^{1}
Years	Club	Games (Goals)
1975–77	Collingwood	23 (8)
- ^{1} Playing statistics correct to the end of 1977.

John Wise (born 19 March 1954) is a former Australian rules footballer who played with Collingwood in the Victorian Football League (VFL).
