= John Wise (Australian politician) =

Australian politician

John Henry Wise (1856 – 25 January 1942) was an English-born Australian politician.

He was born in Hull to stevedore John Wise and Jane Glendenning. On 10 May 1882 he married Mary Jane McLauchlan, with whom he had five children. In Australia he became a builder and an estate agent around the Nepean River district. From 1917 to 1934 he was a member of the New South Wales Legislative Council, representing the Nationalist and United Australia parties. Wise died in 1942 at Strathfield.
