= Thomas Dewey Wise =

American politician

Member of the South Carolina Senate from Charleston County
- In office 1972–1984

Personal details
- Born: August 30, 1939 (age 86) Orangeburg, South Carolina
- Party: Democratic
- Occupation: lawyer

Thomas Dewey Wise (born August 30, 1939) is a former American politician in the state of South Carolina. He served in the South Carolina Senate as a member of the Democratic Party from 1972 to 1984, representing Charleston County, South Carolina. He is a lawyer.
