= Adam W. Oberlin =

American politician (1859–1921)

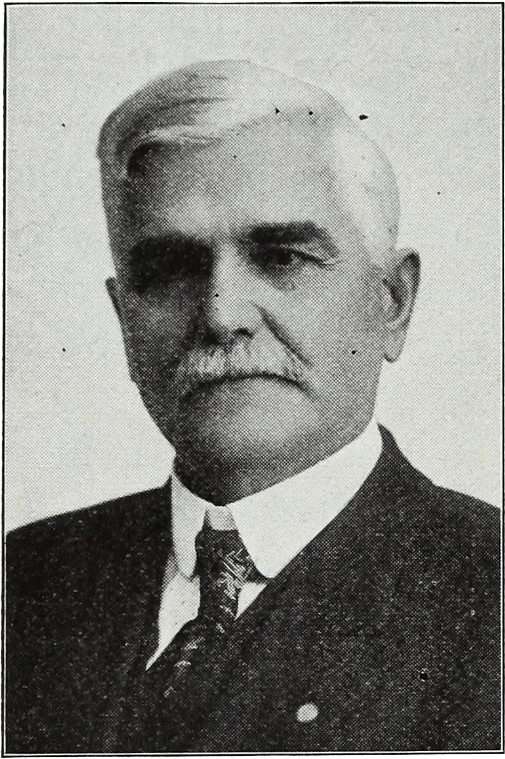
- Oberlin in a 1918 publication

Member of the Ohio Senate from the 21st district
- In office 1917–1917

Member of the Ohio House of Representatives from the Stark County district
- In office 1915–1916

Personal details
- Born: May 13, 1859 Plain Township, Stark County, Ohio, U.S.
- Died: November 1921 (aged 62) Miami-Dade County, Florida, U.S.
- Resting place: Canton, Ohio
- Party: Republican
- Spouses: Marietta Gans (m. 1878); Ida Marie Keough (m. 1921)
- Children: 5
- Education: Spencerian Business College
- Occupation: Carpenter; marshall; politician; real estate businessman; sheriff

Adam W. Oberlin (May 13, 1859 – November 1921) was an American politician from Ohio. He served as a member of the Ohio House of Representatives from 1915 to 1916 and as a member of the Ohio Senate in 1917. In 1917, Oberlin went missing while the Republican candidate for mayor of Canton. He was found in Norfolk, Virginia, working as a carpenter seven months later. He moved to Miami and later worked as a deputy U.S. marshall until his death in 1921.

== Early life and family ==
Adam W. Oberlin was born on May 13, 1859, at a farm in Plain Township, Stark County, Ohio, to Anna (or Nancy) (née Wenger) and John Oberlin. His parents were from Lancaster County, Pennsylvania. His grandfather John Oberlin served in the War of 1812 and his great-grandfather Mike Oberlin served in the Revolutionary War. At a young age, Oberlin learned to mine and haul coal at the coal mine on the family farm. Oberlin was educated at common schools and Avery Academy in Canton. He took a business course at Spencerian Business College in Cleveland. In 1881, Oberlin bought a coal yard in Canton between 3rd and 4th streets.

Oberlin married Marietta Gans, daughter of Benjamin Gans, of Middlebranch in 1878. They had five children, John Frederick, Gertrude, Harold Vincent, Benjamin Gans and Edith. He married Ida Marie Keough on June 1, 1921. He was a member of the Trinity Reformed Church in Canton.

== Legislative career ==
Oberlin was a Republican. In January 1906, Oberlin was appointed deputy sheriff of Stark County. He served until 1911, when he was elected county sheriff. He served in that role for two terms, until 1914. He was elected to the Ohio House of Representatives, representing Stark County, in 1914. While in the House, Oberlin introduced a bill to establish a home for disabled children in Ohio. He was elected to the Ohio Senate, representing the 21st district (Stark and Carroll counties), in 1916. While in the Senate, Oberlin served as chairman of the soldiers' and sailors' home committee. Oberlin worked at the Adam W. Oberlin Agency Company, a real estate company.

== Campaign for mayor and missing months ==
In August 1917, Oberlin defeated incumbent Charles A. Stolberg in the Republican nomination for mayor of Canton. On September 4, 1917, Oberlin went missing. In mid-September, a man was found dead by suicide in nearby Lima, but the body was determined to be a different person. Despite remaining missing, Oberlin's name remained on the ballot for mayor, but lost to Charles E. Poorman. In late March 1918, Oberlin was found in Norfolk, Virginia. After arriving to Norfolk in late September 1917, he worked several jobs before settling to work as a carpenter. He first worked as a carpenter at Naval Station Norfolk and then the army base. During this time, Oberlin reportedly believed his name was "A. Wegner". Oberlin moved back to Ohio with his son and was placed in a sanitarium in Cleveland. After he was found in Norfolk, it was reported that Oberlin shaved his mustache to disguise his identity. In an interview in May of that year, Oberlin revealed he ran away to avoid being elected mayor of Canton and no longer sought political office, but wanted to do physical work.

== Florida years and death ==
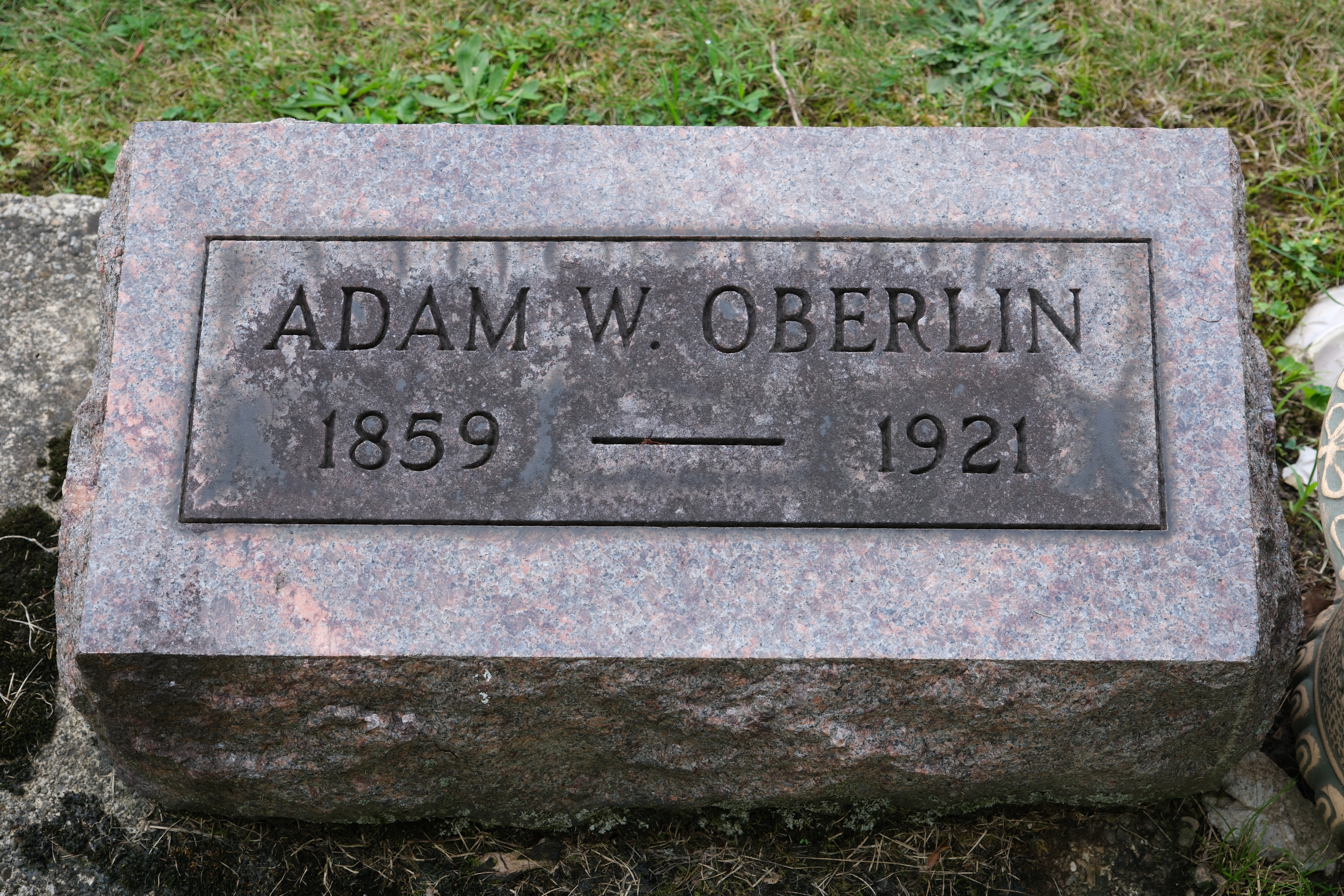
Grave of Oberlin at Henry Warstler Cemetery

In 1919, Oberlin moved to Miami, Florida. After arriving in Miami, he ran for sheriff of Miami on the Republican ticket, but lost. He was appointed by U.S. marshall Dyson as deputy U.S. marshall for the Miami district. He started that role on August 1, 1921.

On November 15, 1921, Oberlin went missing again. His body was found on December 29, 1921, in the Everglades in Miami-Dade County. He died by suicide by gun. He was buried in Canton.
