= Walter G. Agler =

American politician (1880–1944)

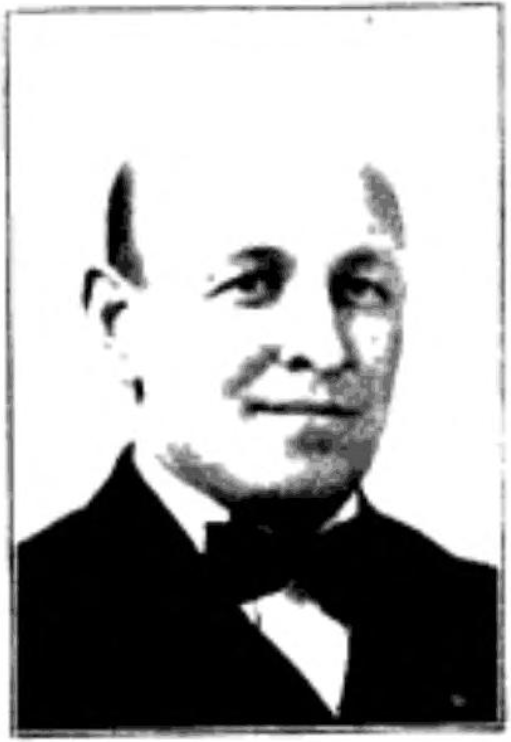
- Agler in 1912 publication

Member of the Ohio House of Representatives from the Stark County district
- In office 1913–1916

Personal details
- Born: Walter Garfield Agler Wilmot, Ohio, U.S.
- Died: March 3, 1944 (aged 63)
- Party: Republican
- Spouse: Lulu E. Ellis (m. 1908)
- Children: 1
- Education: Mount Union College
- Occupation: Politician; educator; livestock dealer

Walter Garfield Agler (April 2, 1880 – March 3, 1944) was an American politician from Ohio. He served as a member of the Ohio House of Representatives representing Stark County from 1913 to 1916.

== Early life ==
Walter Garfield Agler was born on April 2, 1880, in Wilmot, Ohio, to Henry Harrison Agler. He studied at schools in Wilmot and attended Mount Union College.

== Career ==
Agler taught for nine years.

Agler was a Republican. He served as a member of the Ohio House of Representatives representing Stark County from 1913 to 1916. He served as county commissioner of Stark County from 1924 to 1932. Agler was central committeeman for Sugar Creek Township. He served four years as deputy clerk of courts of Stark County under his brother A. W. Agler, who was clerk and later became a judge. Agler served several terms as mayor of Wilmot. In November 1943, Agler was re-elected as mayor, but resigned due to illness.

Agler worked as a livestock dealer and auctioneer.

== Personal life ==
Agler married Lulu E. Ellis of Wilmot in 1908. They had one daughter, Dorothy Jane. Agler lived in Wilmot thought his life, except from 1924 to 1932 when he lived in Canton.

Agler died on March 3, 1944, following a heart attack. He died of a cerebral hemorrhage in an ambulance en route to the Massillon City Hospital.
