= Waitress (2007 film) =

2007 film by Adrienne Shelly

- Theatrical release poster
- Directed by: Adrienne Shelly
- Written by: Adrienne Shelly
- Produced by: Michael Roiff
- Starring: Keri Russell; Nathan Fillion; Cheryl Hines; Adrienne Shelly; Eddie Jemison; Jeremy Sisto; Andy Griffith
- Cinematography: Matthew Irving
- Edited by: Annette Davey
- Music by: Andrew Hollander
- Production companies: Night & Day Pictures
- Distributed by: Fox Searchlight Pictures
- Release dates: January 21, 2007 (Sundance); May 2, 2007 (United States)
- Running time: 107 minutes
- Country: United States
- Language: English
- Budget: $1.5 million
- Box office: $22 million

Waitress is a 2007 American comedy drama film written and directed by Adrienne Shelly, starring Keri Russell as a young woman trapped in a small town and an abusive marriage, who faces an unwanted pregnancy while working as a waitress.

The film premiered at the 2007 Sundance Film Festival, where it was accepted before Shelly's 2006 murder. Waitress received a limited theatrical release in the United States on May 2, 2007, by Fox Searchlight Pictures. Shelly's supporting role is her final film appearance.

In 2015, Waitress was adapted into a Tony-nominated musical of the same name.

== Plot ==
Waitress Jenna Hunterson lives in the American South, trapped in an unhappy marriage with her controlling and abusive husband, Earl. She works in Joe's Pie Diner, where her job includes creating inventive pies with titles inspired by her life, such as the "Bad Baby Pie" she invents after her unintended pregnancy is confirmed. Jenna longs to run away from her marriage and is slowly accumulating money to do so. She pins her hopes for escape on a pie contest in a nearby town, which offers a $25,000 grand prize. However, her husband will not let her go. Jenna's only friends are co-workers Becky and Dawn, and Joe, the owner of the diner and other businesses, who is a regular customer of Jenna's.

Jenna's life changes after she meets her new obstetrician, Jim Pomatter. He has moved to that town to accommodate his wife, who is completing her residency at the local hospital, and is filling in for the woman who has been Jenna's doctor since childhood. The two are attracted to each other, and over the course of several prenatal appointments the attraction grows. The two eventually initiate an affair.

Prompted by her co-workers' gift of a baby journal, Jenna begins to keep a diary, ostensibly as letters to her unborn child, revealing her inner thoughts and plans. Upon learning she is pregnant, Earl demands Jenna promise never to love the baby more than him. Jenna also bonds with her manager, Cal the cook, when she fearfully informs him of her pregnancy, only to discover he already knows and always planned to keep her employed.

At Dawn's wedding at the diner, Earl interrupts the celebration and demands Jenna leave at once. Earl drives Jenna home and confronts her, having found Jenna's stashes of cash throughout the house. Reluctantly, Jenna says that the money was for the baby, which forces her to spend it to conceal its true purpose. Distraught, she flees to Dr. Pomatter. As they fantasize about running away together, Jenna's water breaks.

At the hospital, Jenna discovers Joe is also a patient undergoing an elective procedure; he hands her an envelope with instructions not to open it until after the baby is born. Much to her dismay, she is also greeted by Dr. Pomatter's wife, who is rounding with other residents. Jenna then begs Dr. Pomatter to administer as many drugs as possible so she will not feel a thing.

Jenna gives birth to a baby girl. When she holds her newborn for the first time, Jenna's ambivalence melts into a full-blown bond with her daughter, whom she names Lulu. Earl, disappointed that it is a girl, reminds Jenna of her coerced promise not to love the baby more than she does him. Jenna says she has not loved him in years, will no longer put up with his abuse, and will not let Lulu grow up with his mistreating her, and wants a divorce. Enraged, Earl attempts to assault Jenna, but is escorted out of the hospital by security staff.

Later, as Jenna prepares to leave the hospital, due to Earl refusing to pay her medical bills as retaliation for being kicked out, Becky and Dawn inform her Joe collapsed into a coma during his procedure. Jenna then remembers Joe's envelope. In it, she finds a card with a sketch of her, inscribed "To my only friend, start fresh", along with a check for $270,450.

While leaving the hospital, Dr. Pomatter asks her about their future. She decides to end their relationship, informing him of the enormous trust she sensed from his wife. She then hands him a chocolate Moon Pie and asks her friends to wheel her out. Jenna later wins the contest, and turns the diner into a new restaurant named "Lulu's Pies", and she and Lulu walk home happily.

== Cast ==
- Keri Russell as Jenna Hunterson
- Nathan Fillion as Dr. Jim Pomatter
- Cheryl Hines as Becky
- Adrienne Shelly as Dawn
- Eddie Jemison as Ogie Anhorn
- Jeremy Sisto as Earl Hunterson
- Andy Griffith as Joe
- Lew Temple as Cal
- Darby Stanchfield as Francine Pomatter
- Lauri Johnson as Nurse Norma
- Sarah Hunley as Dr. Lily Mueller
- Nora Paradiso as Ethel
- Holgie Forrester as Dawn's mother
- Sophie Ostroy as Lulu

== Release ==
"Seeing Waitress at Sundance was a really emotional experience. The typical format for the festival is that the director is introduced to say a few words before the film begins. It was painful from the beginning to see that there was no director to introduce the film since Adrienne had died. So the producer and Adrienne's husband Andy talked about how it had been Adrienne's dream to have a film at Sundance. It was very poignant".

–Nancy Utley, COO at Fox Searchlight

The film was accepted into the 2007 Sundance Film Festival, though its premiere was "bittersweet" because writer/director Adrienne Shelly, who also played Dawn in the film, was murdered on November 1, 2006, less than three months before its debut and just before she was about to learn the film had been accepted into the festival. Its success there led Fox Searchlight Pictures to acquire the distribution rights for $4–5 million. It opened the U.S. Comedy Arts Festival.

== Reception ==
The film received mostly positive reviews, with an 89% "Fresh" rating among the 171 critic reviews tracked by Rotten Tomatoes, with an average rating of 7.30/10. The consensus reads: "Sweet, smart, and quirky, Waitress hits the right, bittersweet notes through this romantic comedy through its witty script and a superb performance by Keri Russell". The film also made the site's list of Top 100 films for 2007. It was rated 75 out of 100 at Metacritic. Waitress was called a "good-hearted, well-made comedy" brimming with "quality star wattage".

Mick LaSalle called it a "great American film" that transcends its "air of whimsicality and its emphasis on small-town characters and humble locations".

Keri Russell's performance in the film partly inspired casting director Andrea Romano to cast her as the voice of Wonder Woman in the 2009 animated film Wonder Woman.

In 2024, IndieWire included it on its list of the "Best American Independent Films of the 21st Century," with Sarah Shachat calling it a "pretty simple story with big emotions, told with a camera that finds just the right perspective to make it funny, winsome, and sincere all at once. It’s proof that small-scale filmmaking has nothing to do with how good something can taste."

=== Awards and nominations ===
Award	Category	Nominee(s)	Result	Ref.
AARP Movies for Grownups Awards	Best Supporting Actor	Andy Griffith	Nominated	
Alliance of Women Film Journalists	Best Woman Screenwriter	Adrienne Shelly	Nominated	
Alliance of Women Film Journalists	Best Leap from Actress to Director Award	Adrienne Shelly	Nominated	
Alliance of Women Film Journalists	Women's Image Award	Adrienne Shelly	Nominated	
Alliance of Women Film Journalists	Outstanding Achievement by a Woman in the Film Industry	Adrienne Shelly	Nominated	
Alliance of Women Film Journalists	Lifetime Achievement Award	Adrienne Shelly	Nominated	
Alliance of Women Film Journalists	Best Breakthrough Performance	Keri Russell	Nominated	
Alliance of Women Film Journalists	Best Seduction	Keri Russell and Nathan Fillion	Nominated	
Chlotrudis Awards	Best Supporting Actress	Adrienne Shelly	Nominated	
Chlotrudis Awards	Best Performance by an Ensemble Cast		Won	
Deauville American Film Festival	Grand Prix	Adrienne Shelly	Nominated	
Detroit Film Critics Society Awards	Best Ensemble		Nominated	
Detroit Film Critics Society Awards	Best Newcomer	Adrienne Shelly	Nominated	
Houston Film Critics Society Awards	Best Original Song	"Baby Don't You Cry"	Nominated	
Humanitas Prize	Sundance Feature Film		Nominated	
Independent Spirit Awards	Best Screenplay	Adrienne Shelly	Nominated	
Locarno Film Festival	Audience Award	Adrienne Shelly	Nominated	
National Board of Review Awards	Top 10 Independent Films		Won	
Newport Beach Film Festival	Best Feature		Won	
Newport Beach Film Festival	Best Acting	Nathan Fillion	Won	
Sarasota Film Festival	Narrative Feature	Adrienne Shelly	Won	
Southeastern Film Critics Association Awards	Wyatt Award		Won	
St. Louis Gateway Film Critics Association Awards	Best Comedy or Musical Film		Nominated	

== Stage adaptation ==
A stage musical was written based on the film. The musical opened at the American Repertory Theater, Cambridge, Massachusetts, running from August 2 to September 27, 2015. The music and lyrics are written by Sara Bareilles, with the book by Jessie Nelson. Diane Paulus directed, with choreography by Chase Brock, sets by Scott Pask, costumes by Suttirat Larlarb and lighting by Ken Posner. The original A.R.T. cast featured Jessie Mueller as Jenna, Drew Gehling as Dr. Pomatter, Dakin Matthews as Joe, Keala Settle as Becky, Kimiko Glenn as Dawn, Eric Anderson as Cal, Christopher Fitzgerald as Ogie and Nick Cordero as Earl.

The musical opened on Broadway at the Brooks Atkinson Theatre, with previews starting on March 25, 2016, and the show officially opening on April 24 and closing on January 5, 2020. Mueller, Gehling, Matthews, Settle, and Anderson all returned from the A.R.T production, as well as Glenn as Dawn, Fitzgerald as Ogie, and Cordero as Earl. It returned for a limited engagement at the Ethel Barrymore Theatre from September 2-December 22, 2021 as part of the efforts to slowly reopen Broadway after it was shut down for over a year due to the COVID-19 pandemic. This remounting starred Bareilles (September 2 - October 17) and Jennifer Nettles (October 29 - December 22) as Jenna, with most of the principal cast reprising their roles. It was also done to record the production for a future public release, with STEAM Motion + Sound producing the film. It premiered at the Tribeca Film Festival in June 2023, ahead of a limited theatrical release on December 7 of the same year.
