= Eric Anderson (actor) =

American actor

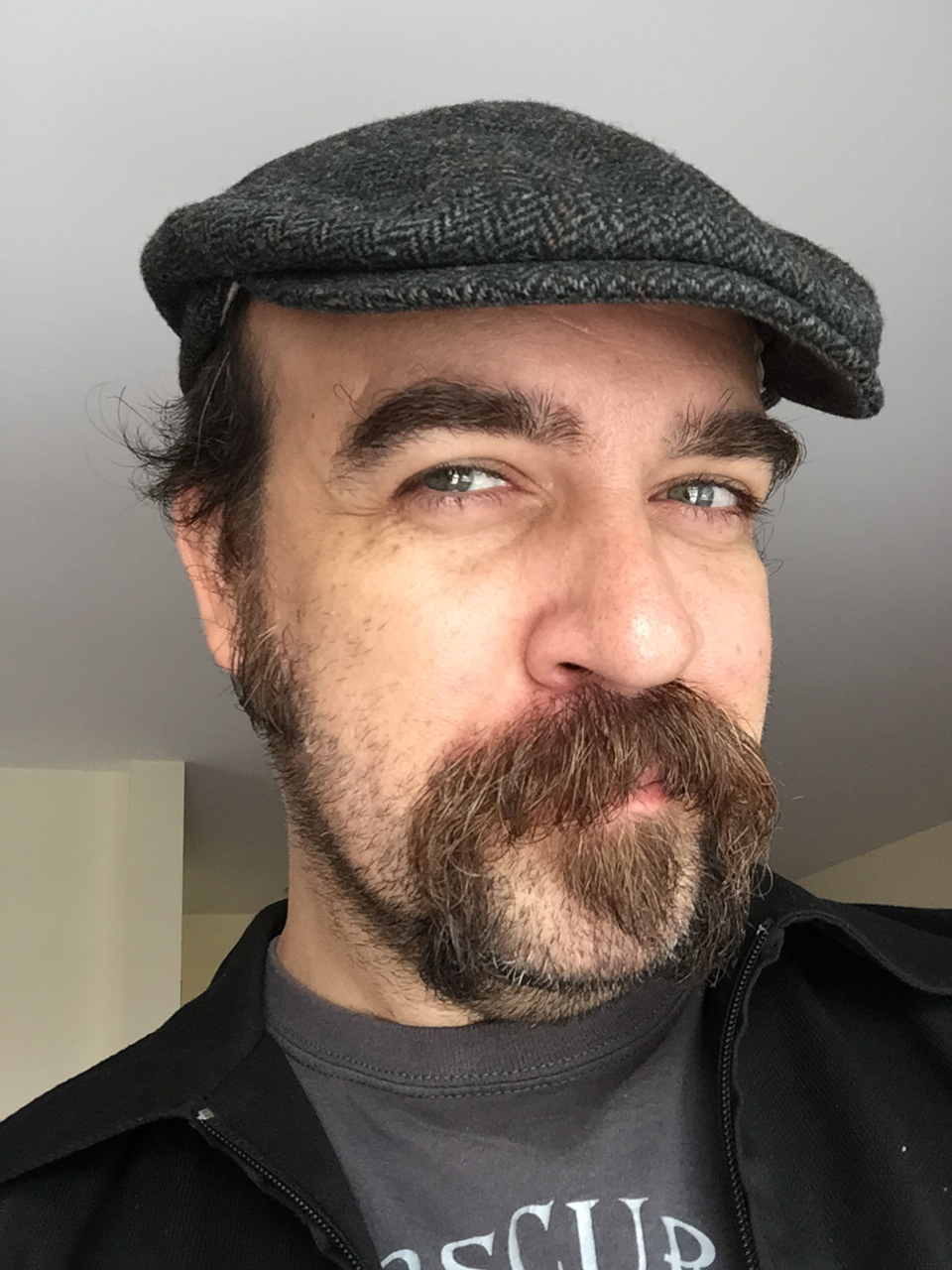
- Anderson in 2015
- Born: December 14, 1972 (age 53); Newport Beach, California, U.S.
- Occupations: Actor; voice actor; singer
- Years active: 1997–present
- Known for: Waitress; Moulin Rouge! The Great Gatsby
- Spouse: Jessica Rush (m. 2011)
- Children: 1

Eric Anderson (born December 14, 1972) is an American actor. On Broadway, he has originated roles in Waitress, Kinky Boots, The Last Ship, Rocky, Soul Doctor, and The Great Gatsby and was nominated for a Drama Desk Award for Outstanding Actor in a Musical. He portrayed Mr. O'Malley in The Greatest Showman (2017). In 2022, he took over the role of Harold Zidler in the jukebox musical Moulin Rouge! on Broadway.

== Career in California ==
In 2006, Anderson won the inaugural Joel Hirschhorn award for outstanding achievement in musical theatre, awarded by the Los Angeles Drama Critics Circle. He received two San Diego Critics Circle Craig Noel Awards and multiple Back Stage West Garland Awards as best actor in a musical.

His performances on the West Coast have included Don Quixote in Man of La Mancha, Dr. Frank N. Furter in The Rocky Horror Show, Richard M. Nixon in Judy's Scary Little Christmas, and Burrs in both versions of The Wild Party. Anderson is a member of the Troubadour Theater Company.

He left California in 2007 to play Merlyn in a U.S. national tour of Camelot opposite Michael York, and moved to New York in 2008. In 2020, he returned to the West Coast to play Captain Hook in Fly at La Jolla Playhouse.

== Broadway ==
In 2009, Anderson made his Broadway debut as Stewpot in the Tony award-winning revival of South Pacific at Lincoln Center. He was in the original Broadway casts of Kinky Boots, written by Harvey Fierstein and Cyndi Lauper, Rocky the Musical, The Last Ship written by Sting, and Soul Doctor at the Circle in the Square Theatre, where he received critical acclaim for his starring role as Shlomo Carlebach. Anderson was nominated for a Drama Desk Award for Outstanding Actor in a Musical for his portrayal in the pre-Broadway production at New York Theatre Workshop. Anderson originated the role of Cal in the musical adaption of Waitress on Broadway, written by Sara Bareilles. Anderson also played the role of Barney Thompson in the musical adaptation of Pretty Woman. In 2022, he took over the role of Harold Zidler in Moulin Rouge! at the Al Hirschfeld Theatre; after Danny Burstein's departure from the show. In 2024, he originated the role of Meyer Wolfsheim in the Broadway production of The Great Gatsby.

== Film and television ==
Anderson portrayed Mr. O'Malley in The Greatest Showman (2017), and has had guest roles on television, including Elementary, The Good Wife, Law & Order: Criminal Intent and Alias. He reprised his role as Cal in Waitress: The Musical filmed on Broadway in 2021 and released in cinemas in 2023.

== Personal life ==
Anderson is married to actress Jessica Rush, and has a daughter, Elliot.

== Theatre credits ==
| Year | Title | Role | Theatre | Director(s) | Ref. |
|---|---|---|---|---|---|
| 2007 | Camelot | Merlyn u/s King Arthur u/s King Pellinore | National tour | Glenn Casale | |
| 2009 | South Pacific | Stewpot (replacement) | Lincoln Center | Bartlett Sher | |
| 2013 | Kinky Boots | Ensemble | Al Hirschfeld Theatre | Jerry Mitchell | |
| 2013 | Soul Doctor | Shlomo Carlebach | Circle in the Square Theatre | Daniel Wise | |
| 2014 | Rocky: The Musical | Gazzo, Tommy Crosetti, Rocky's Cornerman | Winter Garden Theatre | Alex Timbers | |
| 2014 | Death Note: The Musical | Ryuk | English concept album and workshop | | |
| 2014–2015 | The Last Ship | Freddy Newlands | Neil Simon Theatre | Joe Mantello | |
| 2015 | Parade | Detective J.N. Starnes | Lincoln Center | Gary Griffin | |
| 2015 | Waitress | Cal | American Repertory Theater (out-of-town tryout) | Diane Paulus | |
| 2016–2017 | Waitress | Cal | Brooks Atkinson Theatre | Diane Paulus | |
| 2017 | Moulin Rouge! The Musical | Harold Zidler | Unknown, Workshop | | |
| 2018–2019 | Pretty Woman: The Musical | Happy Man / Barney Thompson | Nederlander Theatre | Jerry Mitchell | |
| 2021 | Waitress | Cal | Ethel Barrymore Theatre | Diane Paulus | |
| 2022–2024 | Moulin Rouge! The Musical | Harold Zidler | Al Hirschfeld Theatre | Alex Timbers | |
| 2024–2025 | The Great Gatsby | Meyer Wolfshiem | Broadway Theatre | Marc Bruni | |
| 2025 | Three Summers of Lincoln | George B. McClellan | La Jolla Playhouse | Christopher Ashley | |
| 2025–2026 | The Great Gatsby | Meyer Wolfshiem | Broadway Theatre | Marc Bruni | |
| 2026 | Moulin Rouge! The Musical | Harold Zidler | Al Hirschfeld Theatre | Alex Timbers | |

== Awards and nominations ==
| Year | Award | Category | Nominated Work | Result |
|---|---|---|---|---|
| 2006 | Los Angeles Drama Critics Circle Award | Joel Hirschhorn Award for outstanding achievement in musical theatre | | Won |
| 2013 | Drama Desk Award | Outstanding Actor in a Musical | Soul Doctor | Nominated |
| 2024 | Broadway.com Audience Award | Favorite Featured Actor in a Musical | The Great Gatsby | Nominated |
