= Nathaniel Raymond =

American human rights investigator (born 1977)

Nathaniel A. Raymond
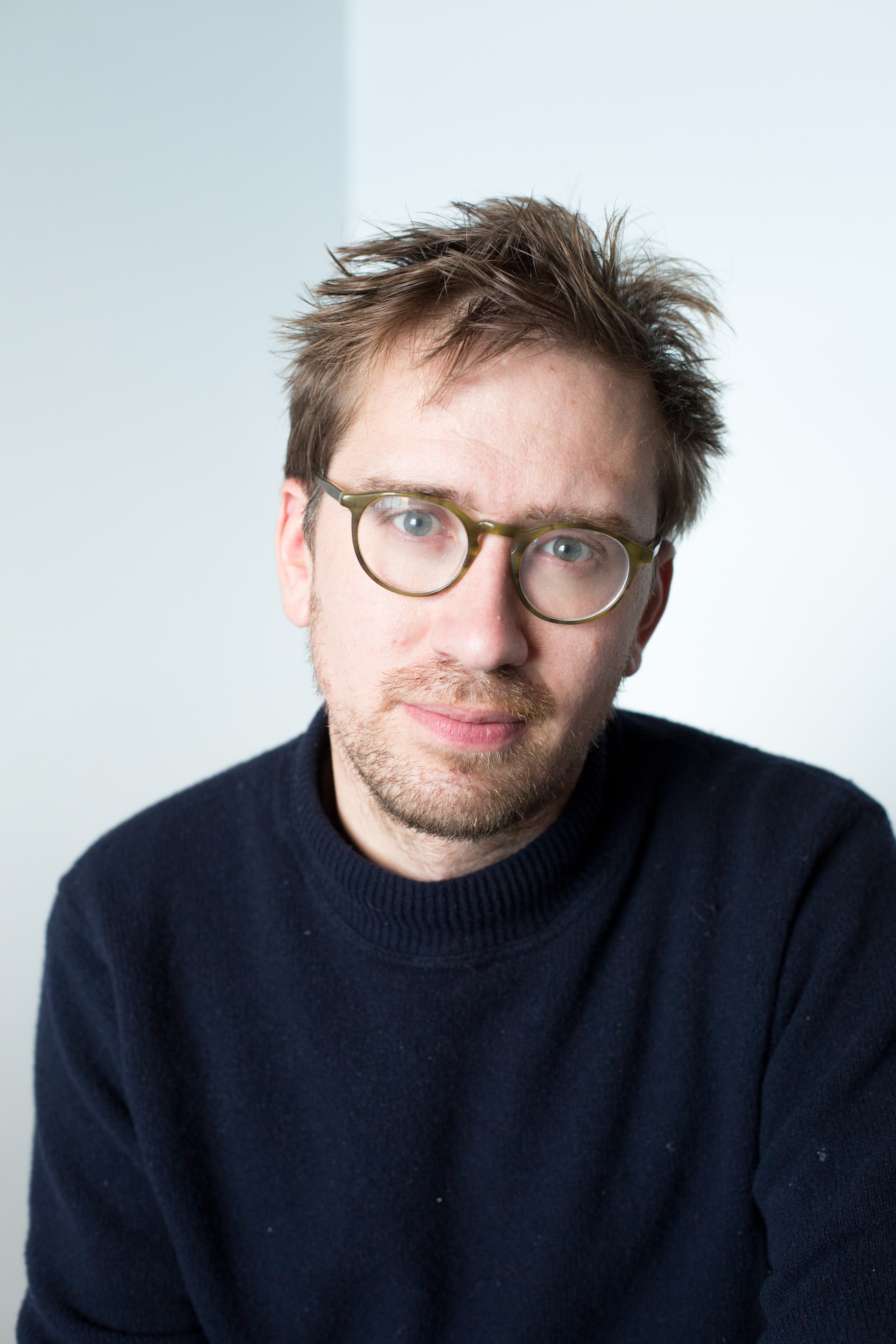
- Raymond in 2013
- Born: November 11, 1977 (age 48); Massachusetts, U.S.
- Education: Drew University, B.A in Religious Studies (1999)
- Occupations: human rights investigator, anti-torture advocate

Nathaniel A. Raymond (born November 11, 1977) is an American human rights investigator, specializing in the investigation of war crimes, including mass killings and torture. Raymond directed the anti-torture campaign at Physicians for Human Rights (PHR), and the utilization of satellite surveillance by the Harvard Humanitarian Initiative (HHI). Raymond advocates the use of intelligence by human rights groups and other non-governmental organizations.

== Anti-torture campaign ==
Raymond led Physicians for Human Rights' investigation into torture by the United States government and other governments as part of the war on terror. He oversaw an inquiry into Dasht-i-Leili massacre in northern Afghanistan, which included the discovery of a mass grave site in 2002. In 2008, the United States Defense Department and State Department released documentation in response to Freedom of Information Act requests by Raymond indicating that 1500-2000 people were killed at Dasht-i-Leili.

He directed an investigation into the role of psychologists during torture sessions, and has alleged that the American Psychological Association (APA) changed its ethics policy specifically to allow psychologists to be present during investigations when torture is used. Raymond criticized the Central Intelligence Agency (CIA) and United States Department of Defense for performing torture and human experimentation on prisoners at Guantanamo Bay and at black sites. He stated that those acts were in violation of the Geneva Conventions, the United Nations Convention against Torture, the Nuremberg Code, and the War Crimes Act of 1996, and has advocated the prosecution of CIA agents and military personnel who engaged in torture.

Raymond has recommended that Congress modify the War Crimes Act to strengthen its prohibition against human experimentation, and that state governments specifically prohibit health care professionals from participating in torture or the improper treatment of prisoners. The documentaries Afghan Massacre: The Convoy of Death and Doctors of the Dark Side were based in part on Raymond's work.

== Satellite surveillance ==
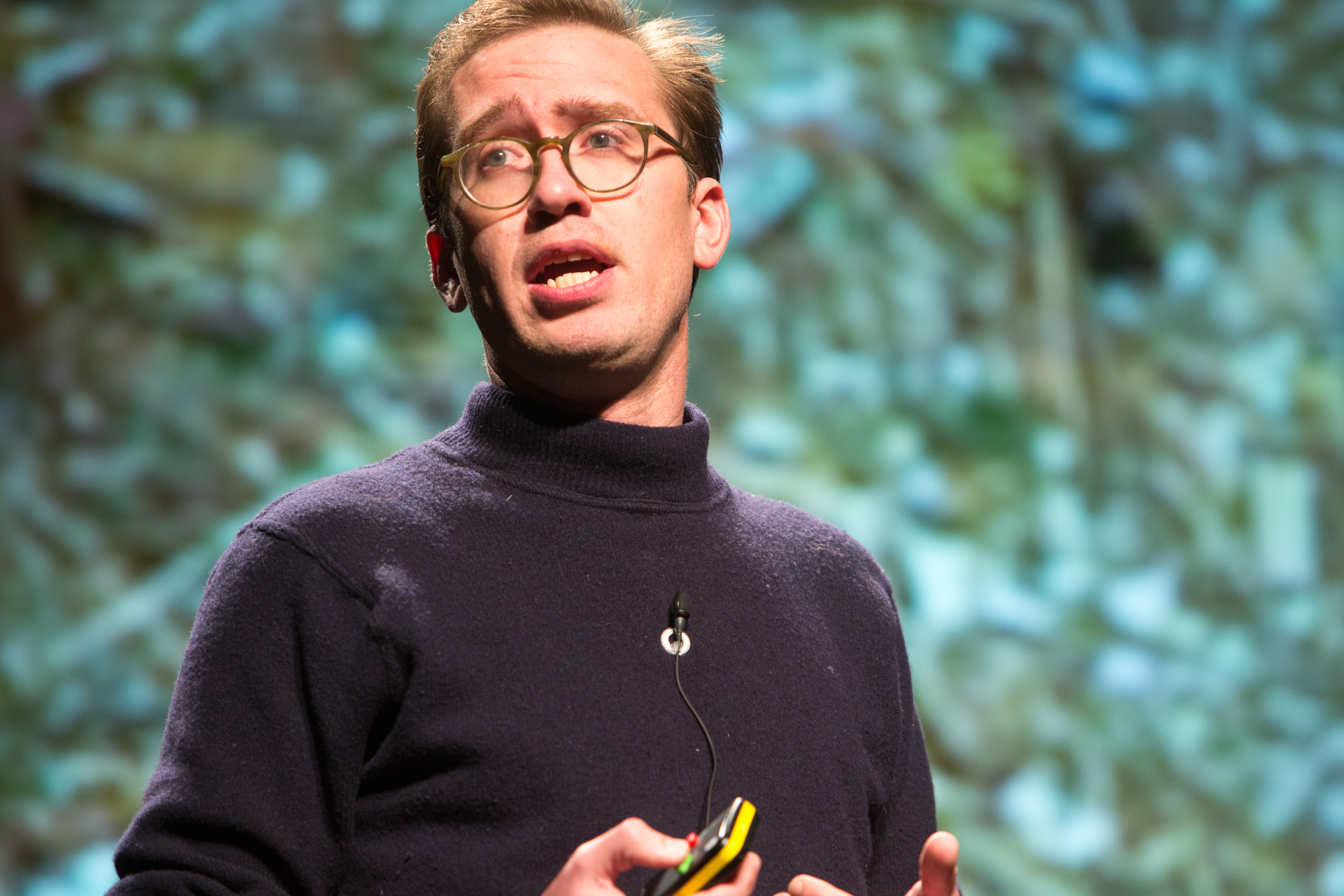
Raymond in 2013 at a PopTech event

Raymond was the director of operations for the Satellite Sentinel Project, a program sponsored by George Clooney, and coordinated through the Harvard Humanitarian Initiative, which utilized satellite imagery and other information to produce reports on the security situation in the Sudan. In 2011, the Satellite Sentinel Project detected images of freshly-dug mass grave sites in the Southern Kordofan state of Sudan, where Sudan's Arab military had been targeting the black ethnic minority. Raymond stated that the Sudanese military violated the Geneva Conventions during their capture of the town of Abyei.

Raymond founded and currently directs Harvard's Signal Program, which conducts research and teaching on the use of technology to document and prevent human rights violations. Raymond has advocated the use of human intelligence and satellite surveillance to investigate and prevent human rights abuses, but has also expressed concerns about the misapplication or abuse of that data. The Signal Program is developing guidelines for how human rights workers should interpret satellite data. Raymond has also stated that an ethics code should be created for the use of crisis mapping. For his work with satellite surveillance, Raymond was named a PopTech Social Innovation Fellow in 2013.
