= Special When Lit =

- Release poster
- Directed by: Brett Sullivan
- Produced by: Brett Sullivan; Clayton Jacobsen; Julian Chow; Emily Rickard (line)
- Edited by: Brett Sullivan
- Music by: Brett Sullivan
- Production companies: Steam Motion and Sound
- Distributed by: PBS International
- Release date: 1 October 2009 (Raindance Film Festival)
- Running time: 97 minutes
- Country: United Kingdom
- Language: English
- Budget: $150,000 (estimated)

Special When Lit is a feature length documentary film about pinball written and directed by Brett Sullivan. The film is produced by Steam Motion and Sound.

== Production ==
Filming took place from mid-2006 to 2008 in several trips to the U.S., France, Italy, Sweden, Australia and the UK. Post-production was completed at Steam Motion and Sound in London during 2008 and 2009.

== Synopsis ==
The pinball industry made more money than the American film industry during the 1950s through the 1970s. Special When Lit explores the former pop icon of the pinball machine, and through interviews with fans, collectors, designers and champion players from across the globe, traces pinball's history through to the present day.

== Recognition ==
Eye for Film wrote "It's not the sort of subject that you'd think would suit a documentary, but it works surprisingly well." It "offers fascinating insights and makes for an enjoyable watch. Special When Lit is reminiscent of that other great documentary Spellbound. Both draw the audience into a world of obsession, impress upon you the level of devotion, and charm you with the people in that world"

Tallahassee Democrat wrote that the film was a "surprisingly compelling documentary".

Chicago Sun-Times called the film a "significant flick in a lineup that runs the gamut from light to heavy religious to political".

Raindance Film Festival director Elliot Grove wrote that the documentary was "masterfully shot" and that its director, Brett Sullivan, was able to bring out a certain nostalgia in his film that was both intriguing and fascinating, with its interviews like "an emotional and sensitive area, with pinball’s fans describing of the game like a relationship, their faces lighting up as if they were recounting their first kiss." He found the winning film to be "encapsulating and absorbing."

The Montana Kaimin wrote "With a gripping intro, the film draws you in and keeps your attention with its larger-than-life characters."

=== Awards and nominations ===
- 2009, Won Best Feature Documentary at Los Angeles United Film Festival
- 2009, Nominated for Best Documentary at Raindance Film Festival
- 2009, Nominated for Best Documentary at Tallahassee Film Festival
- 2010, Won Audience Award for Best Feature Documentary at London United Film Festival

== Release and distribution ==
First premiered in October 2009 at London's Raindance Film Festival where it was nominated for Best Documentary. Subsequent festivals included: Hot Springs Documentary Film Festival, Atlanta International Documentary Film Festival, Big Sky Documentary Film Festival, Calgary International Film Festival, Buffalo Niagara International Film Festival, Bronx International Film Festival, Indianapolis International Film Festival, Da Vinci Film Festival, Tallahassee Film Festival, Los Angeles United Film Festival, USA Film Festival, and Wisconsin Film Festival.

The film was picked up by PBS International Distribution for worldwide sales outside the United States. The film was released on DVD and Blu-ray in January 2011. The Documentary Channel in the United States premiered Special When Lit 21 May 2011. The PBS Channel in the UK premiered Special When Lit 5 November 2011.

== Interviewees ==
- Roger Sharpe
- Rick Stetta
- Sam Harvey
- Steve Epstein
- Gary Stern
- Lyman Sheats Jr.
- Tim Arnold
- Josh Kaplan
- John Broughton
- Pat Lawlor
- Steve Ritchie
- Steve Kordek
- Steve Keeler
- Raphael Lankar
- Koi Morris
- Al Thomka
