= Molly Jobe =

American actress and singer

- Born: Molly Elizabeth Jobe; Columbus, Ohio, U.S.
- Education: New York University
- Occupations: Actress, singer, dancer
- Years active: 1999–present
- Partner: Alex Mandell

Molly Jobe is an American actress and singer, who has performed as lead and understudy in several Broadway shows. She is best known for her five-year run in the musical Waitress.

== Early life and education ==
Jobe was born in Columbus, Ohio, where she attended Tremont Elementary School. As a child she performed in shows at the Columbus Children's Theatre with roles in Annie and The Sound of Music.

Her family moved to New York City in 2001 to support her and her siblings' careers in the performing arts. She graduated from the drama department of LaGuardia Arts High School.

In 2013 she graduated from New York University Tisch School of the Arts with a BFA in musical theater and a minor in Child and Adolescent Psychopathology.

== Career ==
Jobe made her professional acting and Broadway debut at the age of 9 in the musical A Christmas Carol at The Theater at Madison Square Garden, directed by Mike Ockrent.

In 2002 Jobe played the role of Pepper in Annie at the Paper Mill Playhouse, under the direction of Greg Ganakas.

In that same year she had a role in the series The Job, where she played 2nd Kimberly in the episode titled "Sacrilege."

After graduating college, Jobe joined the cast of the musical Newsies at the Nederlander Theater, where she was in the ensemble and understudied the role of Katherine. The production, directed by Jeff Calhoun, garnered acclaim for its energetic performances.

From 2016 to 2020 Jobe was involved in the Broadway musical Waitress at the Brooks Atkinson Theater. She played the role of Francine and was a Swing, while understudying the roles of Dawn and Jenna.

On May 5, 2021, Barry Weissler announced that a remount of the original Waitress production would open following the reopening of Broadway theaters after the COVID-19 shutdown. Jobe joined the cast at the Ethel Barrymore Theater, portraying Mother and an ensemble member, while again understudying the roles of Dawn and Jenna. She also appears in the filmed recording of the musical as Mother. The filmed recording was released in theaters in December 2023 and became available to stream on Max in February 2025.

Jobe had a role in the 2021 film Things Heard and Seen.

In 2021 she appeared in the Netflix miniseries Halston where she played the role of Sassy Johnson opposite Ewan McGregor.

In 2024, Jobe appeared in the biographical film A Complete Unknown, portraying a CBS receptionist in the film about Bob Dylan's early career, starring Timothée Chalamet.

In 2025, Jobe starred as Beth in the world premiere of The Weekend: A Stockbridge Story by Ben Diskant at Barrington Stage Company in Pittsfield, Massachusetts, directed by artistic director Alan Paul.

== Personal life ==
Jobe is engaged to actor Alex Mandell.

== Acting Credits ==
=== Theater ===
Year	Play Title	Role	Theatre	Director(s)	Ref.
1999	A Christmas Carol	Swing	The Theater at Madison Square Garden	Mike Ockrent	
2002	Annie	Pepper	Paper Mill Playhouse	Greg Ganakas	
2014	Newsies	Ensemble/Hannah (u.s. Katherine)	Nederlander Theater	Jeff Calhoun	
2016-2020	Waitress	Francine/Swing (u.s. Dawn and Jenna)	Brooks Atkinson Theater	Diane Paulus	
2021	Waitress	Mother/Ensemble (u.s. Dawn and Jenna)	Ethel Barrymore	Diane Paulus	
2025	The Weekend: A Stockbridge Story	Beth	World premiere; Barrington Stage Company	Alan Paul	

=== Film ===
Year	Title	Role	Ref.
2006	Pitch	Restaurant Patron	
2021	Things Heard and Seen	Wife #1	
2023	Waitress	Mother	
2024	A Complete Unknown	CBS Receptionist	

=== Television ===
Year	Title	Role	Notes	Ref.
2002	The Job	2nd Kimberly	Episode: "Sacrilege"	
2018	Law and Order: Special Victims Unit	Natalie Roberts	Episode: "Chasing Demons"	
2021	Halston	Sassy Johnson	4 episodes	
2025	Godfather of Harlem	Susan	Episode: #4.7	
