= Desi Oakley =

American singer and actress (born 1989)

- Born: June 12, 1989 (age 37); Wichita, Kansas
- Education: University of Michigan (BFA)
- Occupations: Actress, singer
- Known for: Waitress, Chicago, Wicked
- Website: www.desioakley.com

Desiree "Desi" Oakley, (born June 12, 1989), is an American singer and actress, known for her work in musical theatre. She has performed in shows such as Waitress, Chicago, and Wicked.

== Early life and education ==
Desiree "Desi" Oakley was born in Kansas City, Kansas. She first attended professional theatre at Music Theatre Wichita and began performing at the age of 8 years. Some of her early roles included Dorothy Gale in The Wizard of Oz, Eponine in Les Misérables, Gabriella in High School Musical, and Ariel in The Little Mermaid. She graduated with a BFA in Musical Theater, from the University of Michigan in 2011.

== Broadway career ==
Oakley made her Broadway debut in Wicked at the Gershwin Theatre on January 3, 2012, as one of the show's swings. She was later cast as a member of the ensemble and understudied the roles of Elphaba and Nessarose Thropp.

After Wicked, Oakley went on to appear in the 2012 Broadway revival of Annie at the Palace Theatre. In addition to her role in the ensemble, she understudied Grace Farrell and Lily St. Regis. Soon after, Oakley joined the National Tour of the 2012 revival of Evita, as the alternate for the titular role and performing twice per week. In 2016, Oakley joined the cast of the 2014 Broadway revival of Les Misérables at the Imperial Theatre. She served as a member of the ensemble and covered the role of Fantine. Oakley stayed with the production until its final performance on September 4, 2016.

Oakley is perhaps best known for her performance in the lead role of Jenna in Waitress, where she originated on the show's first national tour. She also temporarily starred as Jenna in the West End production of Waitress, at the Adelphi Theatre, in January 2020. On May 13, 2019, Oakley began starring as Roxie Hart in Chicago on Broadway. She played three two-week engagements in the role, with her final performance on July 28, 2019. Her latest album THE LIGHT EFFECT released in June 2022 as a Broadway show, starring Caitlin Kinnunen, Erika Henningsen & Christiani Pitts.

In summer 2024, she reprised the role of Jenna in Waitress at Ogunquit Playhouse and Wells Fargo Pavilion.

== Other work ==
Oakley is also a singer-songwriter. She released the independent studio albums Don't Look Back in 2014 and Repeat in 2019. In 2020, Oakley released A Pocket of Time, and donated the proceeds from digital downloads to the Dramatist Guild Foundation for artists who were struggling as a result of the COVID-19 pandemic. She has also recorded one-off singles including White Butterfly and Winter Song (featuring Becca White). In November 2019 Oakley and her Evita tour castmate Krystina Alabado began a Broadway training program for young actors in New York City called Pop Rock Broadway.
