= Waitress (musical) =

2016 musical by Sara Bareilles

- 2016 Broadway poster
- Music: Sara Bareilles
- Lyrics: Sara Bareilles
- Book: Jessie Nelson
- Basis: Waitress by Adrienne Shelly
- Premiere: August 19, 2015: American Repertory Theater, Cambridge
- Productions: 2015 Cambridge; 2016 Broadway; 2017 US tour 2019 West End; 2019 US tour 2021 Broadway; 2021 UK tour 2022 US tour 2026 UK tour

Waitress is a musical with music and lyrics by Sara Bareilles and a book by Jessie Nelson. It is based on the 2007 film, written and directed by Adrienne Shelly. It tells the story of Jenna Hunterson, a baker and waitress in an abusive relationship with her husband, Earl. After Jenna unexpectedly becomes pregnant with Earl's child, she begins an affair with her obstetrician, Jim Pomatter. Looking for ways out of her troubles, and at the urging of her friends, she enters a pie-baking contest, seeing its grand prize as her chance.

After a tryout at the American Repertory Theater in Cambridge, Massachusetts, in August 2015, Waitress premiered at the Brooks Atkinson Theatre on Broadway in April 2016, closing in January 2020, with direction by Diane Paulus and starring Jessie Mueller as Jenna. A US national tour ran from 2017 to 2019. From 2019 to 2020, the musical played at the Adelphi Theatre in London's West End. In September 2021, it returned to Broadway for a limited engagement at the Ethel Barrymore Theatre starring Bareilles as Jenna, mainly to produce a live stage recording that played in movie theaters in 2023. Further international, touring and regional productions have been staged.

== Background ==
The musical is based on the 2007 indie film Waitress. The film was produced on a budget of just $1.5 million, earning over $23 million in global box office receipts. The film starred Keri Russell and was written and directed by Adrienne Shelly. The film follows Jenna, a waitress and pie chef living in a small town in the American South, who unexpectedly becomes pregnant and feels trapped in an unhappy marriage. Looking for a way out, she sees a pie contest and its grand prize as her chance.

Following the 2013 Tony Awards, producers Barry and Fran Weissler announced that a musical version of the film was in the works, with Paula Vogel writing the book, Sara Bareilles writing the music and lyrics, and direction by Diane Paulus. The Weisslers purchased the stage rights to the film shortly after its release in 2007. Paula Vogel withdrew from the project in January 2014. On December 11, 2014, the musical was officially confirmed, and it was announced that the show would receive its world premiere at the American Repertory Theater in Cambridge, Massachusetts, as part of their 2015–2016 season, with Jessie Nelson now writing the book. A workshop was held the same month in New York City, with Jessie Mueller, Keala Settle, Barrett Wilbert Weed, Christopher Fitzgerald, Bryce Pinkham, and Andy Karl, among others, taking part. Nelson, with the blessing of the late Adrienne Shelly's husband, used some of Shelly's unfinished scripts to help bring "her voice" to the project.

Waitress had a production team led by women, with Diane Paulus as director, Sara Bareilles as composer and lyricist, Jessie Nelson as book adaptor and Lorin Latarro as choreographer for the first time in Broadway history. The Clinton Foundation honored the show's female-led creative team by launching the #CeilingBreaker campaign and distributing free tickets.

== Synopsis ==
=== Act I ===
Jenna is a waitress and expert pie baker at Joe's Pie Diner in the American South. She bakes pies to distract herself from her unhappiness with her home life ("What's Inside"). She begins another day at the diner with her boss Cal and fellow waitresses Becky and Dawn ("Opening Up"). After Jenna almost throws up, Becky and Dawn convince her to take a pregnancy test which, to Jenna's dismay, comes back positive; Jenna deduces the pregnancy came from a night when she drunkenly had sex with her abusive husband, Earl ("The Negative"). Earl comes to the diner and suggests he wants to make Jenna quit and give up her passion for baking. He takes the tips she has earned from working so far that day. She decides not to tell him about her pregnancy and recalls her late mother, who also found solace from an unhappy marriage in baking ("What Baking Can Do").

At her OB/GYN's office, Jenna is taunted by other pregnant women ("Club Knocked Up") and meets Dr. James "Jim" Pomatter, a new doctor from Connecticut. Jenna explains she does not want to raise a child but does not want an abortion, and leaves Dr. Pomatter with a Mermaid Marshmallow pie, which he eats and loves ("Pomatter Pie").

Word of Jenna's pregnancy reaches Joe, the diner's elderly owner, who suggests she enter a local pie-baking contest with a cash prize of $20,000, which would give Jenna enough money to leave Earl. Dawn begins using an online dating platform but is terrified of every outcome ("When He Sees Me").

Jenna runs into Dr. Pomatter at the bus stop. He tells her he loved the Mermaid Marshmallow pie, saying it could "win contests and ribbons and things" ("It Only Takes a Taste"). Jenna arrives home to learn Earl has been fired from his job. He berates her, and his anger almost turns physical; out of impulse and fear, Jenna confesses she is pregnant. Earl softens up, but makes Jenna promise not to love the baby more than she loves him ("You Will Still Be Mine"). Jenna tells Dawn and Becky of her plan to enter the pie contest; if she wins, she will use the prize money to leave Earl and raise the baby herself. The three waitresses see their dreams of a better life within reach ("A Soft Place to Land"). Jenna begins to give Earl only half her earnings, hiding the other half around the house in order to save up for entering the pie contest.

Dawn's date, Ogie, visits the diner. Dawn believes that their first date did not go well, but Ogie insists on finding out more about Dawn and helping her overcome her anxiety ("Never Ever Getting Rid of Me"). Dawn and Ogie realize how much they have in common, such as their mutual enjoyment of American Revolution reenactments. Jenna makes an appointment with Dr. Pomatter, where he comes in two hours early just to see her again. Jenna confronts Dr. Pomatter, accusing him of being strange, but then she impulsively kisses him. Though both are married, they decide to escape their frustrating lives, and have sex in his office ("Bad Idea").

=== Act II ===
After her tryst, Jenna discovers Becky and Cal making out at the diner. The married Becky is unashamed of giving in to passion ("I Didn't Plan It"). Jenna and Dr. Pomatter continue their affair, as do Becky and Cal; Dawn and Ogie begin their relationship ("Bad Idea (Reprise)"). Jenna wonders if having an affair is a mistake, but Dr. Pomatter reassures her. Jenna begins writing a letter to her baby ("You Matter to Me").

After happily dating for several months, Dawn and Ogie get married at the diner ("I Love You Like a Table"). Jenna arrives with a tiered pie resembling a wedding cake. At the reception, Jenna asks if Cal, despite his affair, is truly happy; he responds that he is "happy enough." Joe tells Jenna his sincere hopes for her ("Take It from an Old Man"). Earl drags Jenna home and uncovers the money she has been hiding. She meekly tells him she has been saving for the baby, but Earl leaves with the money. Jenna breaks down, lamenting her long-lost control over her life ("She Used to Be Mine").

Jenna goes into labor ("Contraction Ballet"). She sees Joe at the hospital on his way to surgery. Joe gives Jenna an envelope, and tells her not to open it until she leaves the hospital. Earl, Becky and Dawn, and even Dr. Pomatter's wife, who is a resident at the hospital, crowd the delivery room. Jenna cries out in distress and gives birth. She names her daughter Lulu. Earl reminds Jenna of her promise not to love Lulu more than him, and Jenna finally tells him she wants a divorce. He reacts poorly, and she implies she will seek a restraining order against him if he ever comes near her or Lulu. Dr. Pomatter visits Jenna alone in her room, but Jenna refuses his kiss. Saying she does not want to remain "happy enough", she ends the affair. As thanks for his positive impact on her life, she gives him a moon pie. Jenna remarks on her change in outlook with Lulu in her life ("Everything Changes").

Jenna opens Joe's envelope. Knowing he was dying, he left her the diner in his will; Joe also wanted Jenna to "name a pie after me when I'm gone". Five years later, the diner has been renamed "Lulu's Pies" and Jenna, the owner and head chef, is content that her life has finally turned around ("Opening Up (Finale)").

== Productions ==
=== Cambridge, Massachusetts (2015) ===
Waitress began previews at the American Repertory Theater in Cambridge, Massachusetts, on August 2, 2015, before the official opening on August 19, 2015, for a limited run to September 27, 2015. Tickets for the production sold out. The show was directed by Diane Paulus, with choreography by Chase Brock, set design by Scott Pask, costume design by Suttirat Anne Larlarb, lighting design by Kenneth Posner, musical direction by Nadia DiGiallonardo, and sound by Jonathan Deans. The cast featured Jessie Mueller as Jenna, Drew Gehling as Jim, Joe Tippett as Earl, Jeanna de Waal as Dawn, Keala Settle as Becky, Dakin Matthews as Joe, Jeremy Morse as Ogie, and Eric Anderson as Cal. Mueller notably won the IRNE Award for Best Actress in a Musical for her performance in a season dominated by Natasha, Pierre & The Great Comet of 1812.

=== Broadway (2016–2020) ===
Broadway previews began on March 25, 2016, at the Brooks Atkinson Theatre, with the official opening on April 24, just in time for the April 28 Tony Awards cut-off date. Lorin Latarro replaced Brock as choreographer and Christopher Akerlind replaced Posner as lighting designer. For the Broadway production, elements of the book were rewritten, new choreography developed, and a new song written by Bareilles. Manhattan baker Stacy Donnelly and Small Business Owner Dawn Mayo of Everythingdawn were hired to ensure that the baking scenes were realistic. Donnelly taught the cast how to work and roll pie dough, as the role of Jenna required Mueller to crack eggs, sift flour, and roll out dough on stage. Mayo created all of the prop pies used in the show.

To help immerse audiences, real pies were warming as they entered the theater, creating the aroma of a pie shop; slices of pie were for sale. Cast changes included Nick Cordero taking over the role of Earl, Kimiko Glenn as Dawn, and Christopher Fitzgerald, who took part in the New York workshop, as Ogie. During previews, the production set a new box-office record for a single performance at the Brooks Atkinson Theatre, taking in $145,532. The production's initial investment was $12 million. During a technical halt at a preview performance, Bareilles performed two songs, including "Down at the Diner", previously cut from the production.

Waitress made history on Broadway with the four top creative spots in a show being filled by women (Bareilles, Nelson, Latarro, and Paulus). In addition, the costume designer and musical director were women. Bareilles said she was proud to be part of an all-female team: "It's really fun to be an example of the way it can look. We're a bunch of women who are deeply committed to finding a way to build a unified vision." Only the 1978 Broadway musical Runaways had a similar history, with book, music, lyrics, choreography and direction all by Elizabeth Swados.

Notable cast replacements included Bareilles, Betsy Wolfe, Katharine McPhee, Nicolette Robinson, Shoshana Bean, Alison Luff, and Jordin Sparks as Jenna; Jason Mraz, Gavin Creel, Joey McIntyre, and Jeremy Jordan as Dr. Pomatter; Will Swenson and Joe Tippett as Earl; Bill Nolte as Joe; June Squibb as Josie (A female version of Joe), and Larry Marshall reprising the role of Joe from the US tour; Eddie Jemison reprised his role of Ogie from the film, and Al Roker played the role of Joe twice.

The production closed on January 5, 2020, after 33 previews and 1,544 regular performances.

=== Broadway (2021) ===
Barry Weissler remounted the original production, again starring Bareilles, in a limited engagement opening on September 2, 2021, at the Ethel Barrymore Theatre, making it the first musical on Broadway to begin performances following the COVID-19 shutdown. The primary reason for its return engagement was to record the production for a future release, with STEAM Motion + Sound producing the film version. Several other returning cast members starred in the production, including Gehling as Dr. Pomatter, Tippett as Earl, Dawson as Becky, Houlahan as Dawn, Matthews as Joe, Fitzgerald as Ogie, and Anderson as Cal. To honor Nick Cordero, who originated the role of Earl, and who died of COVID-19, the remount added some dialogue: Jenna names the tiered wedding pie "A Big Ol' Slice of Live Your Life Pie", in reference to Cordero's single "Live Your Life". The run concluded on December 22, 2021, two weeks earlier than planned, due to a spike of COVID-19. Replacements in the closing cast were Joshua Henry as Pomatter and Ciara Renée as Jenna.

=== US national tours ===
The first US national tour, with Desi Oakley as Jenna, Lenne Klingaman as Dawn, Charity Angél Dawson as Becky, and Bryan Fenkart as Dr. Pomatter, began at Playhouse Square in Cleveland, Ohio, on October 20, 2017, and closed on August 18, 2019.

A non-equity tour, starring Bailey McCall as Jenna, Kennedy Salters as Becky, Gabriella Marzetta as Dawn, and David Socolar as Dr. Pomatter, opened on November 12, 2019, and closed on June 12, 2022. Because of the 2020 COVID-19 pandemic, many performances were cancelled or rescheduled.

Another US national tour played just two engagements, at the Blumenthal Performing Arts Center in Charlotte, North Carolina (from April 19 to May 22, 2022), and at the Hanna Theatre in Cleveland (from May 26 to June 26, 2022).

A U.S. tour is set to begin performances in September 2026 at the RiverPark Center in Owensboro, Kentucky, starring Samantha Lane Scruggs as Jenna.

=== West End (2019–2020) ===
The production opened in London's West End on March 7, 2019, following previews which began on February 8, at the Adelphi Theatre, and featured Katharine McPhee as Jenna; she had previously played the role on Broadway; Jack McBrayer was Ogie. Lucie Jones took over the role of Jenna on June 17, 2019. Desi Oakley, a Jenna on the US tour, joined the show in London in January, when Jones as well as her understudies, Sarah O'Connor and Olivia Moore, were too ill to perform. Bareilles and Gavin Creel reunited in London from January 28, 2020, until the end of the run.

The production was scheduled to end on July 4, 2020, but it closed on March 14, when West End theatres shut down due to COVID-19 pandemic. The producers later announced the show would not re-open.

=== UK and Ireland tours (2021–2022; 2026–present) ===
Following the West End run, after delays due to the ongoing COVID-19 pandemic, a tour began on 4 September 2021 at the New Wimbledon Theatre, running until 20 August 2022 at the Theatre Royal, Norwich. Lucie Jones, Sandra Marvin and Evelyn Hoskins reprised the roles of Jenna, Becky and Dawn from the West End production. Matt Willis also starred as Dr Pomatter, with Christopher D Hunt as Cal and Jenna played by Chelsea Halfpenny from 2022.

Another tour began performances on 28 March 2026 at the New Wimbledon Theatre. The cast includes Carrie Hope Fletcher as Jenna for half of the performances with Hoskins and Marvin reprising their roles as Dawn and Becky, alongside Les Dennis as Joe, Dan Partridge as Pomatter, Mark Anderson as Ogie, Mark Willshire as Earl and Dan O’Brien as Cal. The tour is set to close in October 2026 at The Lowry with Jones as Jenna.

=== International productions ===
Atlantis Theatrical Entertainment Group staged a production from November 2018 at the Carlos P. Romulo Auditorium, Makati City, in Manila, Philippines, featuring Joanna Ampil as Jenna. It was the musical's first non-replica production. It closed on December 2, 2018. A Spanish language production (locally translated as Camarera) debuted in Buenos Aires, Argentina, at the Metropolitan Sura Theatre on April 17, 2019, and featured Josefina Scaglione as Jenna (translated to Gina). The Spanish translation was done by Lily Ann Martin and Pablo del Campo. The production closed on August 4, 2019.

Sponsored and produced by Toho, Fuji Television and Kyodo Tokyo, a Japanese production of Waitress the Musical premiered in Tokyo on March 9, 2021 at the Nissay Theatre. It is the first production to open since the global lockdown of COVID-19 pandemic. The show starred Mitsuki Takahata as Jenna and Mamoru Miyano as Dr. Pomatter; it closed in May 2021. Due to COVID-19 restrictions, part of the creative team travelled to Japan and quarantined before the start of the rehearsal process, while others worked remotely. The musical played at Teatr Muzyczny Roma in Warsaw, Poland, opening on May 30, 2021, after delays due to the pandemic. It closed on March 27, 2022.

A French-language production, translated by Joëlle Bond and Elizabeth Cordeau-Rancourt, ran at Théâtre Saint-Denis in Montreal and Salle Albert-Rousseau in Quebec City. Starring Marie-Eve Janvier, it opened on June 26, 2024, and closed on August 31, 2024. Reviews praised the adaptation and the performances. A French version of "She Used to Be Mine", "Cachée au fond de moi", performed by Janvier, was released as a single on May 10, 2024, to promote the production. Another Canadian production played at the Grand Theatre in London, Ontario, between March 25 and April 12, 2025. It then transferred to Theatre Aquarius in Hamilton, where it played between April 30 and May 18, 2025.

An Australian production opened at Her Majesty's Theatre, Melbourne in May 2026 and is set to close in July 2026, starring Natalie Bassingthwaighte as Jenna, Gabriyel Thomas as Becky, Mackenzie Dunn as Dawn, Rob Mills as Dr. Pomatter and John Waters as Joe. A Sydney transfer was scheduled, but that was cancelled.

=== Filmed stage production ===
The 2021 Broadway production starring Bareilles and Gehling was recorded for future release, with STEAM Motion + Sound producing the film. The film premiered at the Tribeca Festival on June 12, 2023, and was released theatrically on December 7, 2023 by Bleecker Street and Fathom Events.

== Music ==
Waitress features an original score, with music and lyrics by American singer-songwriter Sara Bareilles. In a rare practice for a Broadway musical, the orchestrations were created by Bareilles in collaboration with the orchestra. Nadia DiGiallonardo conducted the original Broadway orchestra. The musical uses a six-member orchestra consisting of keyboard, piano, cello, guitar, bass, and drums. In addition to the show's musical numbers, Bareilles also recorded the "turn off your cellphone" message, rewriting part of her original song "Cassiopeia".

=== Musical numbers ===
2016 Broadway Production

Act I

- "What's Inside" – Jenna and Ensemble
- "Opening Up" – Jenna, Becky, Dawn, Cal and Company
- "The Negative" – Becky, Dawn and Jenna
- "What Baking Can Do" – Jenna and Ensemble
- "Club Knocked Up" – Female Ensemble
- "Pomatter Pie" – Band
- "When He Sees Me" – Dawn
- "It Only Takes a Taste" – Dr. Jim Pomatter and Jenna
- "You Will Still Be Mine" – Earl and Jenna
- "A Soft Place to Land" – Jenna, Becky and Dawn
- "Never Ever Getting Rid of Me" – Ogie and Ensemble
- "Bad Idea" – Jenna, Dr. Pomatter and Ensemble

Act II

- "I Didn't Plan It" – Becky
- "Bad Idea" (Reprise) – Jenna, Dr. Pomatter, Becky, Cal, Dawn, Ogie and Ensemble
- "You Matter to Me" – Dr. Pomatter and Jenna
- "I Love You Like a Table" – Ogie, Dawn and Ensemble
- "Take It From an Old Man" – Joe and Ensemble‡
- "She Used to Be Mine" – Jenna
- "Contraction Ballet" – Jenna and Company
- "What's Inside (Reprise)" – Company *
- "Everything Changes" – Jenna, Becky, Dawn and Company
- "Opening Up" (Finale) – Company

*Not included on Original Broadway Cast Recording.

‡ When June Squibb entered the cast of Waitress on Broadway in 2018, she was announced to be playing "Josie" (the gender-modified character name of "Joe"). In return, the song title and all frequent uses of the word "Man" was changed to "Ma'am" for her performance run.

=== Recordings ===
Bareilles recorded her fifth studio album, What's Inside: Songs from Waitress, featuring songs from the musical. It was released through Epic Records on November 6, 2015. The album debuted at number ten on the US Billboard 200 chart with 30,000 equivalent album units in its first week of release, giving Barellies her fifth top-ten album. The lead single from the album, "She Used to Be Mine", was released digitally on September 25, 2015. Speaking about the release of the album, Bareilles stated that her decision to record an album of the songs came because it "proved impossible for me to imagine handing over the songs to the show before selfishly finding a way to sing them myself."

The original Broadway cast recording was released as a digital download on June 3, and the physical release followed on July 1, 2016. The album was produced by Bareilles with Neal Avron and recorded by DMI Soundtracks.

== Casts and characters ==
Character	Workshop	American Repertory Theater	Broadway	US tour	West End	Broadway (Note: This cast is also featured in the live stage recording Waitress: The Musical.)	UK tour	UK tour
Character	2014	2015	2016	2017	2019	2021		2026
Jenna	Jessie Mueller	Jessie Mueller	Jessie Mueller	Desi Oakley	Katharine McPhee	Sara Bareilles	Lucie Jones	Carrie Hope Fletcher
Dr. Pomatter	Bryce Pinkham	Drew Gehling	Drew Gehling	Bryan Fenkart	David Hunter	Drew Gehling	Matt Willis	Dan Partridge
Becky	Keala Settle	Keala Settle	Keala Settle	Charity Angél Dawson	Marisha Wallace	Charity Angél Dawson	Sandra Marvin	Sandra Marvin
Dawn	Barrett Wilbert Weed	Jeanna de Waal	Kimiko Glenn	Lenne Klingaman	Laura Baldwin	Caitlin Houlahan	Evelyn Hoskins	Evelyn Hoskins
Joe	Dakin Matthews	Dakin Matthews	Dakin Matthews	Larry Marshall	Shaun Prendergast	Dakin Matthews	Michael Starke	Les Dennis
Ogie	Christopher Fitzgerald	Jeremy Morse	Christopher Fitzgerald	Jeremy Morse	Jack McBrayer	Christopher Fitzgerald	George Crawford	Mark Anderson
Earl	Andy Karl	Joe Tippett	Nick Cordero	Nick Bailey	Peter Hannah	Joe Tippett	Tamlyn Henderson	Mark Willshire
Cal	Eric Anderson	Eric Anderson	Eric Anderson	Ryan G. Dunkin	Stephen Leask	Eric Anderson	Christopher D. Hunt	Dan O'Brien
Nurse Norma	Amber Iman	Charity Angél Dawson	Charity Angél Dawson	Maiesha McQueen	Kelly Agbowu	Anastacia McCleskey	Scarlet Gabriel	Ellie Ruiz Rodriguez

=== Notable replacements ===
==== Broadway (2016–2020; 2021) ====
- Jenna Hunterson: Sara Bareilles, Betsy Wolfe, Katharine McPhee, Nicolette Robinson, Shoshana Bean, Alison Luff, Jordin Sparks, Jennifer Nettles, Ciara Renée
- Jim Pomatter: Chris Diamantopoulos, Jason Mraz, Gavin Creel, Joey McIntyre, Jeremy Jordan, Mark Evans, Joshua Henry
- Becky: Charity Angél Dawson
- Dawn: Jenna Ushkowitz, Katie Lowes, Colleen Ballinger
- Joe: Larry Marshall, John Cullum, Lee Wilkof, Steve Vinovich, Bill Nolte, Al Roker, June Squibb (as Josie), Richard Kline
- Ogie Anhorn: Alex Wyse, Eddie Jemison, Noah Galvin, Todrick Hall, Nik Dodani
- Earl Hunterson: Will Swenson, Joe Tippett

==== US tour (2017–2019) ====
- Joe: Bill Nolte, Richard Kline

==== West End (2019–2020) ====
- Jenna Hunterson: Lucie Jones, Sara Bareilles, Desi Oakley
- Jim Pomatter: Gavin Creel
- Dawn: Ashley Roberts, Hannah Tointon, Evelyn Hoskins
- Ogie Anhorn: Blake Harrison, Joe Sugg

==== UK tour (2021–2022) ====
- Jenna Hunterson: Chelsea Halfpenny
- Jim Pomatter: David Hunter

== Critical response ==
The show garnered generally mixed-to-positive reviews in both runs. Frank Rizzo, reviewing the Boston production for Variety, wrote: "...making Earl so relentlessly horrible makes Jenna's inability to leave him not just indecisive but something more worrisome... Meanwhile, there's little evidence for the good doctor being Jenna's lost soulmate, despite his loving bedside manner... Mueller's performance transcends the show's imperfections. She's funny, frisky and likable. She sings Bareilles' songs beautifully... director Diane Paulus fills the production with clever touches – a scalloped pie-crust proscenium, a fluid and easygoing flow and a natural truthfulness in the performances."

For the Broadway production, many critics found Bareilles' score and Mueller's performance to be the highlights of the show. Charles Isherwood of The New York Times gave a mixed review of the show, but called Mueller's performance "a high point of the Broadway season". Time Out New York gave the production four stars and said, "Waitress has an excellent ratio of sweet to tart; supporting characters who provide crustiness (Dakin Matthews's grumbly store owner) and flakiness (Christopher Fitzgerald's loony admirer of another waitress); and cooked-to-perfection staging by Diane Paulus. The whole dish is—please forgive me—love at first bite." David Rooney of The Hollywood Reporter said, "...the material is anchored at every step by Bareilles' melodious pop score and Mueller's supremely natural performance as Jenna. While the stock characters that surround her may be familiar, they're a winsome bunch played by sterling performers".

== Awards and nominations ==
=== Original Broadway production ===
Year	Award Ceremony	Category	Nominee	Result	Ref
2016	Tony Awards	Best Musical		Nominated	
2016	Tony Awards	Best Original Score	Sara Bareilles	Nominated	
2016	Tony Awards	Best Performance by a Leading Actress in a Musical	Jessie Mueller	Nominated	
2016	Tony Awards	Best Performance by a Featured Actor in a Musical	Christopher Fitzgerald	Nominated	
2016	Drama Desk Award	Outstanding Musical		Nominated	
2016	Drama Desk Award	Outstanding Actress in a Musical	Jessie Mueller	Nominated	
2016	Drama Desk Award	Outstanding Featured Actor in a Musical	Christopher Fitzgerald	Won	
2016	Drama Desk Award	Outstanding Book of a Musical	Jessie Nelson	Nominated	
2016	Drama Desk Award	Outstanding Music	Sara Bareilles	Nominated	
2016	Drama Desk Award	Outstanding Lyrics	Sara Bareilles	Nominated	
2016	Drama League Award	Outstanding Production of a Broadway or Off-Broadway Musical		Nominated	
2016	Drama League Award	Distinguished Performance Award	Jessie Mueller	Nominated	
2016	Outer Critics Circle Award	Outstanding New Broadway Musical		Nominated	
2016	Outer Critics Circle Award	Outstanding Actress in a Musical	Jessie Mueller	Nominated	
2016	Outer Critics Circle Award	Outstanding Featured Actor in a Musical	Christopher Fitzgerald	Won	
2016	Outer Critics Circle Award	Outstanding New Score (Broadway or off-Broadway)	Sara Bareilles	Nominated	
2017	Grammy Award	Best Musical Theater Album		Nominated	

=== Original West End production ===
Year	Award Ceremony	Category	Nominee	Result	Ref
2020	Laurence Olivier Awards	Best New Musical		Nominated	
2020	Laurence Olivier Awards	Original Score or New Orchestrations	Sara Bareilles	Nominated	
