= Joe Tippett =

American actor (born 1982)

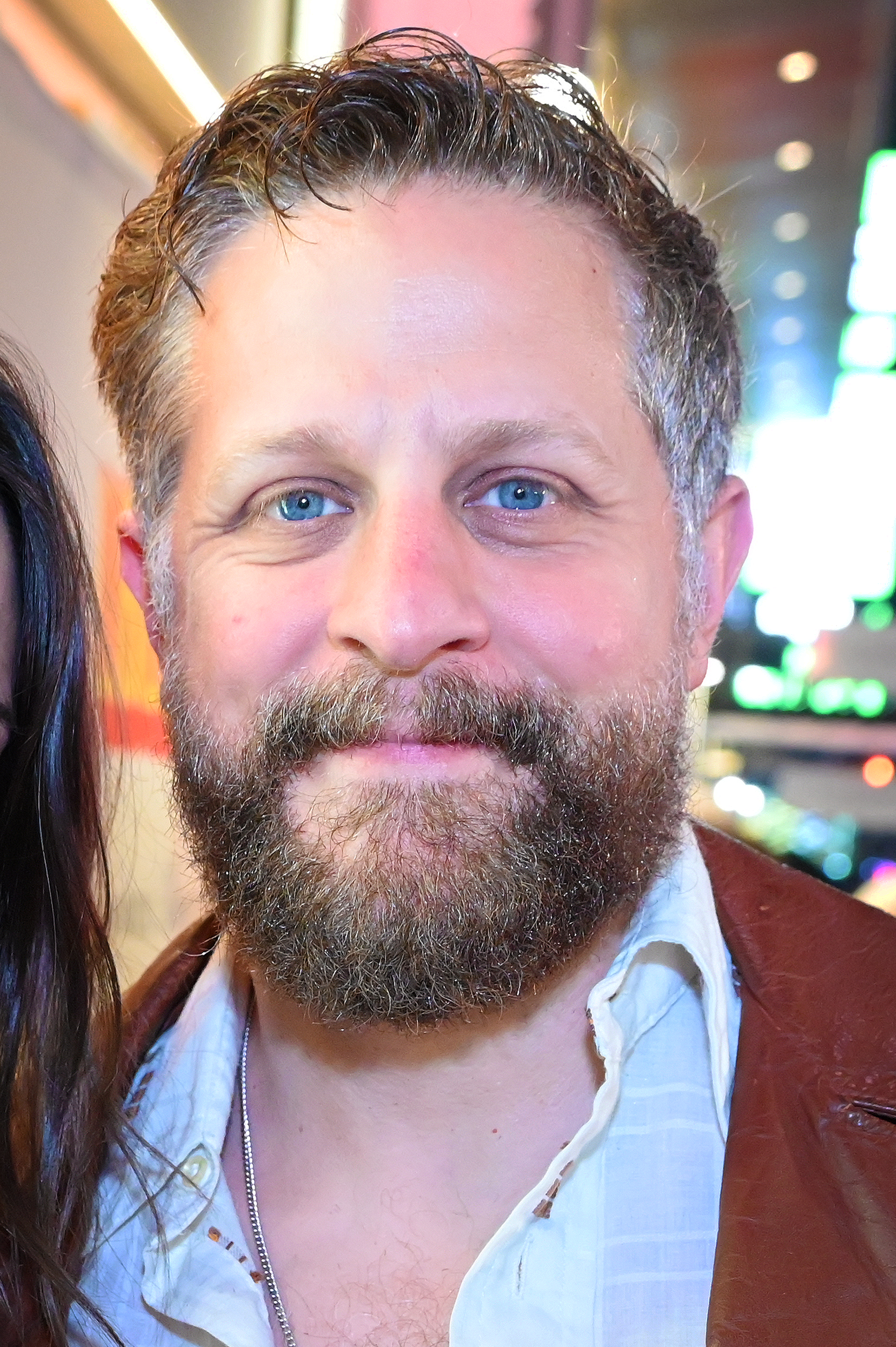
- Tippett in 2025
- Born: March 1, 1982 (age 44); Washington, D.C., U.S.
- Occupation: Actor
- Years active: 2006–present
- Spouse: Sara Bareilles (m. 2025)

Joe Tippett (born March 1, 1982) is an American actor. He is known for playing Sam Strickland in the NBC drama series Rise and John Ross in the HBO crime drama miniseries Mare of Easttown.

== Early life ==
Tippett was born on March 1, 1982, and grew up in Damascus, Maryland. He attended Damascus High School, where he was on the football team. He was also involved in his school's theater department, where he performed in his first musical, Bye Bye Birdie. After graduating from high school, he went to West Virginia University on a full scholarship but later dropped out.

== Career ==
Tippett did an apprenticeship and worked his first professional job at the Williamstown Theatre Festival. In 2015, he made his Broadway debut as Bait Boy in Airline Highway. The same year, he played Earl Hunterson in the American Repertory Theater production of Waitress. Two years later, Tippett played the leading man in the Off-Broadway production of All the Fine Boys.

In 2018, Tippett played Coach Strickland on NBC's Rise. In 2019, Tippett filmed the TV movie Patsy & Loretta, playing the role of Doolittle Lynn, Loretta Lynn's husband. The TV film was broadcast on the Lifetime channel on October 19, 2019. The same year, Tippett was cast as Lucius King in NBC's Prism which is inspired by Rashomon, a 1950 Japanese drama directed by Akira Kurosawa.

In September 2021, Tippett reprised his role as Earl Hunterson in the Broadway return engagement of Waitress.

== Personal life ==
In August 2015, Tippett met singer-songwriter Sara Bareilles during the out-of-town tryout for Waitress at the American Repertory Theater in Cambridge, Massachusetts, and they began a relationship in 2016. The couple made their first public appearance at the 2017 Tony Awards. On New Year's Day in 2023, Tippett and Bareilles announced their engagement. They were married on October 4, 2025.

== Filmography ==
=== Film ===
Year	Title	Role	Notes	Ref.
2006	Gray Matters	Ben		
2011	Doctors of the Dark Side	Unknown	Documentary	
2012	Damascus Roads	Finch	Short film	
2016	Our Time	Jamie		
2018	Monsters and Men	Officer Montori		
2019	Patsy & Loretta	Doolittle Lynn		
2022	Mr. Harrigan's Phone	Craig's father		
2022	Spirited	Owen Briggs		
2023	Waitress: The Musical	Earl Hunterson		
2024	A Complete Unknown	Dave Van Ronk		
2026	Happy Hours	TBA		

=== Television ===
Year	Title	Role	Notes	Ref.
2013	Boardwalk Empire	Cal	Episodes: White Horse Pike, The North Star	
2015	The Blacklist	Jasper Skeehan	Episode: "Kings of the Highway"	
2016	Bull	Merle Deavers	Episode: "Callisto"	
2017	Chicago Justice	Jake Benjamin	Episode: "Friendly Fire"	
2018	Rise	Sam Strickland	10 episodes	
2018	Dirty John	Bobby	Episodes: "Red Flags and Parades", "Shrapnel"	
2019	The Act	Scott / Wolverine 2	Episode: "Two Wolverines"	
2019	Patsy & Loretta	Doolittle "Mooney" Lynn	Lifetime TV film	
2019–2023	The Morning Show	Hal Jackson	Recurring	
2021	Mare of Easttown	John Ross	Miniseries	
2022	Alaska Daily	Jamie	Recurring	
2023–present	Monarch: Legacy of Monsters	Tim	Main role	
2025	American Primeval	James Wolsey	6 episodes	

== Stage ==
Year	Title	Role	Venue	Ref.
2013	Ashville	Jake	Off-Broadway	
2015	Airline Highway	Bait Boy	Broadway	
2015	Waitress	Earl Hunterson	Boston	
2016	Indian Summer	Jeremy	Off-Broadway	
2016	Familiar	Brad	Off-Broadway	
2016	This Day Forward	Emil	Off-Broadway	
2017	All the Fine Boys	Joseph	Off-Broadway	
2017–2018	Waitress	Earl Hunterson	Broadway	
2018	Our Very Own Carlin McCullough	Jay	Los Angeles	
2021	Waitress	Earl Hunterson	Broadway	
