= Waitress: The Musical =

2023 American musical film

- Promotional release poster
- Directed by: Brett Sullivan (live film); Diane Paulus (stage)
- Written by: Jessie Nelson
- Based on: Waitress by Sara Bareilles and Jessie Nelson
- Produced by: Michael Roiff; Barry and Fran Weissler; Sara Bareilles; Jessie Nelson; Paul Morphos
- Starring: Sara Bareilles; Charity Angél Dawson; Caitlin Houlahan; Drew Gehling; Dakin Matthews; Eric Anderson; Joe Tippett; Christopher Fitzgerald
- Edited by: Marko Keser; David Tregoning; Sarah Broshar
- Music by: Sara Bareilles
- Production companies: Dear Hope Productions; National Artists Management Company; Night & Day Pictures; FilmNation Entertainment; Steam Motion and Sound; PJM Productions
- Distributed by: Bleecker Street
- Release dates: June 12, 2023 (Tribeca); December 7, 2023 (United States)
- Running time: 144 minutes
- Country: United States
- Language: English
- Box office: $6 million

Waitress (also known by its promotional title Waitress: The Musical) is a 2023 American musical comedy-drama film of the stage musical, which premiered in 2015. The film was recorded live at a performance of the musical in New York City. The 2007 film Waitress upon which the stage musical was in turn based, was written and directed by Adrienne Shelly. With music and lyrics by Sara Bareilles and a book by Jessie Nelson, the musical explores themes of female empowerment, personal transformation, and resilience, through the story of Jenna, a small-town waitress and expert pie baker who seeks to escape her unhappy marriage to an abusive husband.

The film was produced in 2021 during the musical's limited run at the Ethel Barrymore Theatre on Broadway. The film features the cast of this remounting, including Bareilles (who also serves as a producer), Charity Angél Dawson, Caitlin Houlahan, Drew Gehling, Dakin Matthews, Eric Anderson, Joe Tippett, and Christopher Fitzgerald. Diane Paulus directed the production, with Brett Sullivan directing the live filming and Nelson serving as a creative advisor. It premiered at the Tribeca Film Festival on June 12, 2023, was theatrically released by Bleecker Street in the United States on December 7, 2023, and received positive reviews from critics.

== Background ==
After a tryout at the American Repertory Theater in Cambridge, Massachusetts, in August 2015, the musical Waitress premiered at the Brooks Atkinson Theatre on Broadway in April 2016, closing in January 2020, with direction by Diane Paulus and starring Jessie Mueller as Jenna; during the run, Sara Bareilles was a replacement player as Jenna. In March 2020, the Broadway theater district shut down, remaining closed for a year and a half due to the COVID-19 pandemic. Producer Barry Weissler announced that a remount of the original production, starring Bareilles, would play following the reopening of Broadway theaters.

The show returned in a limited engagement on September 2, 2021, at the Ethel Barrymore Theatre, making it the first musical on Broadway to begin performances following the COVID-19 shutdown. The primary reason for its return was to film the production for a future public release. Several of the cast members from the original Broadway run starred in the production, including Bareilles as Jenna, Drew Gehling as Dr. Pomatter, Joe Tippett as Earl, Charity Angél Dawson as Becky, Caitlin Houlahan as Dawn, Dakin Matthews as Joe, Christopher Fitzgerald as Ogie, and Eric Anderson as Cal; Paulus returned to direct the production. Brett Sullivan directed the filming, with his company, Steam Motion and Sound, producing the film. Nelson served as a film creative advisor. The run concluded on December 22, 2021, two weeks earlier than planned due to a spike of COVID-19.

== Plot ==
=== Act I ===
Jenna is a waitress and expert pie baker at Joe's Pie Diner in the American South. She bakes pies to distract herself from her unhappiness with her home life ("What's Inside"). She begins another day at the diner with her boss Cal and fellow waitresses Becky and Dawn ("Opening Up"). After Jenna almost throws up, Becky and Dawn convince her to take a pregnancy test which, to Jenna's dismay, comes back positive; Jenna deduces the pregnancy came from a night when she drunkenly had sex with her abusive husband, Earl ("The Negative"). Earl comes to the diner and suggests he wants to make Jenna quit and give up her passion for baking. He takes the tips she has earned from working so far that day. She decides not to tell him about her pregnancy and recalls her late mother, who also found solace from an unhappy marriage in baking ("What Baking Can Do").

At her OB/GYN's office, Jenna is taunted by other pregnant women ("Club Knocked Up") and meets Dr. James "Jim" Pomatter, a new doctor from Connecticut. Jenna explains she does not want to raise a child but does not want an abortion, and leaves Dr. Pomatter with a Mermaid Marshmallow pie, which he eats and loves ("Pomatter Pie").

Word of Jenna's pregnancy reaches Joe, the diner's elderly owner, who suggests she enter a local pie-baking contest with a cash prize of $20,000, which would give Jenna enough money to leave Earl. Dawn begins using an online dating platform but is terrified of every outcome ("When He Sees Me").

Jenna runs into Dr. Pomatter at the bus stop. He tells her he loved the Mermaid Marshmallow pie, saying it could "win contests and ribbons and things" ("It Only Takes a Taste"). Jenna arrives home to learn Earl has been fired from his job. He berates her, and his anger almost turns physical; out of impulse and fear, Jenna confesses she is pregnant. Earl softens up, but makes Jenna promise not to love the baby more than she loves him ("You Will Still Be Mine"). Jenna tells Dawn and Becky of her plan to enter the pie contest; if she wins, she will use the prize money to leave Earl and raise the baby herself. The three waitresses see their dreams of a better life within reach ("A Soft Place to Land"). Jenna begins to give Earl only half her earnings, hiding the other half around the house in order to save up for entering the pie contest.

Dawn's date, Ogie, visits the diner. Dawn believes that their first date did not go well, but Ogie insists on finding out more about Dawn and helping her overcome her anxiety ("Never Ever Getting Rid of Me"). Dawn and Ogie realize how much they have in common, such as their mutual enjoyment of American Revolution reenactments. Jenna makes an appointment with Dr. Pomatter, where he comes in two hours early just to see her again. Jenna confronts Dr. Pomatter, accusing him of being strange, but then she impulsively kisses him. Though both are married, they decide to escape their frustrating lives, and have sex in his office ("Bad Idea").

=== Act II ===
After her tryst, Jenna discovers Becky and Cal making out at the diner. The married Becky is unashamed of giving in to passion ("I Didn't Plan It"). Jenna and Dr. Pomatter continue their affair, as do Becky and Cal; Dawn and Ogie begin their relationship ("Bad Idea (Reprise)"). Jenna wonders if having an affair is a mistake, but Dr. Pomatter reassures her. Jenna begins writing a letter to her baby ("You Matter to Me").

After happily dating for several months, Dawn and Ogie get married at the diner ("I Love You Like a Table"). Jenna arrives with a tiered pie resembling a wedding cake. At the reception, Jenna asks if Cal, despite his affair, is truly happy; he responds that he is "happy enough." Joe tells Jenna his sincere hopes for her ("Take It from an Old Man"). Earl drags Jenna home and uncovers the money she has been hiding. She meekly tells him she has been saving for the baby, but Earl leaves with the money. Jenna breaks down, lamenting her long-lost control over her life ("She Used to Be Mine").

Jenna goes into labor ("Contraction Ballet"). She sees Joe at the hospital on his way to surgery. Joe gives Jenna an envelope, and tells her not to open it until she leaves the hospital. Earl, Becky and Dawn, and even Dr. Pomatter's wife, who is a resident at the hospital, crowd the delivery room. Jenna cries out in distress and gives birth. She names her daughter Lulu. Earl reminds Jenna of her promise not to love Lulu more than him, and Jenna finally tells him she wants a divorce. He reacts poorly, and she implies she will seek a restraining order against him if he ever comes near her or Lulu. Dr. Pomatter visits Jenna alone in her room, but Jenna refuses his kiss. Saying she does not want to remain "happy enough", she ends the affair. As thanks for his positive impact on her life, she gives him a moon pie. Jenna remarks on her change in outlook with Lulu in her life ("Everything Changes").

Jenna opens Joe's envelope. Knowing he was dying, he left her the diner in his will; Joe also wanted Jenna to "name a pie after me when I'm gone". Five years later, the diner has been renamed "Lulu's Pies" and Jenna, the owner and head chef, is content that her life has finally turned around ("Opening Up (Finale)").

== Cast ==
- Sara Bareilles as Jenna, a waitress and expert pie baker at Joe's Pie Diner
- Drew Gehling as Dr. Pomatter, Jenna's new gynecologist
- Charity Angél Dawson as Becky, Jenna's friend and coworker
- Caitlin Houlahan as Dawn, Jenna's friend and coworker
- Dakin Matthews as Joe, the owner of Joe's Pie Diner
- Christopher Fitzgerald as Ogie, a customer of Joe's Pie Diner
- Joe Tippett as Earl, Jenna's husband
- Eric Anderson as Cal, the manager of Joe's Pie Diner
- Anastacia McCleskey as Nurse Norma, Dr. Pomatter's assistant
- Stephanie Torns as Francine, Dr. Pomatter's wife and a resident at the hospital
- Molly Jobe as Jenna's mother
- Matt Deangelis as Jenna's father

== Musical numbers ==
Act I

- "What's Inside" – Jenna and Ensemble
- "Opening Up" – Jenna, Becky, Dawn, Cal and Company
- "The Negative" – Becky, Dawn and Jenna
- "What Baking Can Do" – Jenna and Ensemble
- "Club Knocked Up" – Female Ensemble
- "Pomatter Pie" – Band
- "When He Sees Me" – Dawn
- "It Only Takes a Taste" – Dr. Jim Pomatter and Jenna
- "You Will Still Be Mine" – Earl and Jenna
- "A Soft Place to Land" – Jenna, Becky and Dawn
- "Never Ever Getting Rid of Me" – Ogie and Ensemble
- "Bad Idea" – Jenna, Dr. Pomatter and Ensemble

Act II

- "I Didn't Plan It" – Becky
- "Bad Idea" (Reprise) – Jenna, Dr. Pomatter, Becky, Cal, Dawn, Ogie and Ensemble
- "You Matter to Me" – Dr. Pomatter and Jenna
- "I Love You Like a Table" – Ogie, Dawn and Ensemble
- "Take It From an Old Man" – Joe and Ensemble
- "She Used to Be Mine" – Jenna
- "Contraction Ballet" – Jenna and Company
- "What's Inside (Reprise)" – Company
- "Everything Changes" – Jenna, Becky, Dawn and Company
- "Opening Up" (Finale) – Company

End credits

- "A Soft Place to Land" (Instrumental) – The Waitress Band
- "Down at the Diner" – Sara Bareilles

== Release ==
The film premiered in the Spotlight+ section of the Tribeca Film Festival in New York City on June 12, 2023, followed by a post-screening musical performance by Bareilles. Simultaneously, it was broadcast with sound through the TSX app onto TSX Entertainment's 18,000-square-foot digital screen overlooking Times Square, including the broadcast of an introduction by Bareilles. In September 2023, Bleecker Street acquired U.S. distribution rights to the film, partnering with Fathom Events for its theatrical release. It was theatrically released in the United States on December 7, 2023. The film's theatrical run lasted until December 21.

The film was released on digital platforms and Video on demand on January 9, 2024, and on Blu-ray on February 6, 2024, by Decal. It became available for streaming on Max in February 2025

== Reception ==
On the review aggregator website Rotten Tomatoes, 100% of 19 critics' reviews are positive. Metacritic, which uses a weighted average, assigned the film a score of 77 out of 100, based on 6 critics, indicating "generally favorable" reviews. Bareilles's performance as Jenna was praised for its depth and vulnerability, and the film was admired for maintaining the stage show’s theatrical energy while making smart cinematic choices in its filming.

=== Box office ===
The film grossed an estimated $3.2 million during its opening weekend from 1,214 theaters, finishing eighth. The movie made $5.4 million domestically and about $689,000 elsewhere. Worldwide, the film made more than $6 million.
