= Soul Doctor =

2013 Broadway musical by Daniel Wise about Shlomo Carlebach

- Journey of a Rockstar Rabbi
- 2013 Broadway Playbill
- Music: Shlomo Carlebach
- Lyrics: Shlomo Carlebach, David Schechter
- Book: Daniel Wise
- Basis: The life of Shlomo Carlebach
- Productions: 2008 New York City; 2010 New Orleans; 2011 Miami; 2012 Off-Broadway New York City; 2013 Broadway; 2014 Montreal; 2014 Off-Broadway

Soul Doctor - Journey of a Rockstar Rabbi is a Broadway musical that details the life of Rabbi Shlomo Carlebach, with music and lyrics by Shlomo Carlebach and David Schechter, and book and direction by Daniel Wise. The Soul Doctor show debuted at Le Petit Theatre du Vieux Carre in New Orleans, and had subsequent runs at The Colony Theater in Miami, The Parker Playhouse in Ft Lauderdale, and The New York Theatre Workshop in New York City. The Broadway production started previews in July 2013 with its official opening night taking place August 15, 2013 at Broadway's Circle in the Square Theatre.

== Synopsis ==
This coming-of-age story of courage and inspiring perseverance opens in 1960s Vienna, where Shlomo Carlebach is giving a concert, having returned to the city for the first time in decades, and then transitions back in time to Nazi-occupied Austria when Shlomo, as a child, witnessed the murder of a Jewish man singing in the streets. This experience causes Shlomo to make a pledge to always stand up for freedom of expression through music. To escape persecution, the Carlebach family moves to the Upper West Side in New York City where Shlomo is a Yeshiva student studying the Talmud and memorizing the Torah, following in his father's footsteps to become a Rabbi.

Shlomo's path soon changes when he meets legendary jazz singer Nina Simone in a Greenwich Village night club. She not only teaches him about her gospel and jazz musical roots, but also recounts how her people, like Jews in Europe at the time, were being persecuted in the U.S. Inspired by the music of Simone, Shlomo begins to break Orthodox tradition by obtaining a guitar. He is soon writing songs and playing his music for audiences including women and non-Jews in clubs around New York City. Shlomo embraces pop music and hippiedom over established scholasticism despite ramifications within his family. In the late 1960s he moved to Haight-Ashbury in San Francisco where a "House of Love and Prayer" becomes his home with a following that keeps growing. During this period he played alongside acts such as Bob Dylan, the Grateful Dead, Pete Seeger, and Jefferson Airplane.

He and Nina Simone end the show back in Vienna, performing a concert in memory of the Jewish singer he saw gunned down in the street by Nazis.

== Productions ==
=== New Orleans (2010) ===
Soul Doctor debuted at Le Petit Theatre du Vieux Carre in New Orleans on November 8, 2010, following previews in New York City.

=== Miami and Ft. Lauderdale (2011-2012) ===
Soul Doctor had consecutive runs at The Colony Theater in Miami and The Parker Playhouse in Ft Lauderdale from December 25, 2011 - January 29, 2012.

=== New York City - Off Broadway (2012) ===
Soul Doctor had a run at New York Theatre Workshop from July 30 - August 19, 2012.

=== New York City - Broadway (2013) ===
Soul Doctor opened at Circle in the Square Theatre on August 15, 2013. Producers announced on October 8, 2013, that Soul Doctor will end its Broadway run Oct. 13 at the Circle in the Square.

=== Montreal (2014) ===
Soul Doctor was performed in Yiddish at The Segal Centre for Performing Arts by the Dora Wasserman Yiddish Theatre from June 8 to June 29, 2014.

=== New York City – Off Broadway (2014) ===
Soul Doctor had a newly re-imagined run at The Actor's Temple in New York City. Directed and choreographed by Mindy Cooper, this production starred Josh Nelson and Dan'Yelle Williamson as Shlomo Carlebach and Nina Simone respectively. Other cast members included: Jacob Heimer (Eli Chaim), Debra Cardona (Mother), Don Meehan (Father), Anthony Laciura (Reb Pinchas/Moisheleh), Hayden Wall (Young Shlomo), Rosalie Graziano (Young Eli Chaim), Dianna Barger (Ruth), John Plumpis (Milt Oken), Jesse Swimm (Blind Guitarist/Dr. Joel), Lee Hollis Bussie (Bandleader), Janelle McDermoth (Pastor), Matthew Dunivan (Swing). The production started previews on November 28, 2014, with an official opening on December 14, 2014. Soul Doctor had its closing night on January 25, 2015.

=== Jerusalem, Israel (2018) ===
Soul Doctor was recently performed at Bet Shmuel in Jerusalem from 7 June 2018 to 28 June 2018.

== Musical numbers ==
Act I

- "Once In A Garden" (Essa Einai) – Shlomo Carlebach
- "Finger On The Place" (Gevalt/Good Shabbos) – Traditional Melody
- "We Built A Life Here" (Rachmono Perrok) – Shlomo Carlebach
- "Bereishis" (In The Beginning) (Re'h Nah/V'Ye'esayu) – Shlomo Carlebach
- "Keep The Fire Burning" (U'vnei Ossa) – Shlomo Carlebach
- "Torah Song" (Lulei Torascha) – Shlomo Carlebach
- "Shlomo's Dream" (Essa Einai – reprise) – Shlomo Carlebach
- "Arise!" (Uforatzto) – Traditional Melody
- "Rock Around The Torah" (Uforatzto) – Shlomo Carlebach
- "I Put A Spell On You" - Screamin' Jay Hawkins
- "Four Women" - Nina Simone
- "Ki Va Moed" – Shlomo Carlebach
- "I Put A Spell On You" (Reprise) - Screamin' Jay Hawkins
- "Ein K'Elokeinu" – Shlomo Carlebach
- "He's Just A Child" (Ana Hashem)
- "Ki Va Moed" – Shlomo Carlebach
- "Where Am I To Turn To?" (Pischu Li/Haneshama Lach)
- "Ode Yishama - Part 1" – Shlomo Carlebach
- "Ode Yishama - Part 2" – Shlomo Carlebach
- "Medley" (Asher Bara, David Malech, Yiboneh Essa Einai) – Shlomo Carlebach
- "Sinnerman" (U'vnei Ossa) – Traditional Melody
- "Hashmiini" – Shlomo Carlebach

Act II

- "Sing Shalom" (Oseh Shalom) – Shlomo Carlebach
- "Lord Get Me High" – Shlomo Carlebach
- "Absolutely Not!" (Rachmono Perok) – Shlomo Carlebach
- "Brothers And Friends" (Lemaan Achai) – Shlomo Carlebach
- "In America" (Vehaer/Lo Tevoshi) – Shlomo Carlebach
- "The Shlomo Tango" (Lo Tevoshi) – Shlomo Carlebach
- "Family Legacy" (Haneshama/Ana Hashem) – Shlomo Carlebach
- "Song of Shabbos" – Shlomo Carlebach
- "The Sun Is Sinking Fast" (Hinei) – Shlomo Carlebach
- "Tune In, Turn On"
- "Where to Go" (Ana Hashem)
- "Yerushalyim"
- "Adam Was Alone" (Mimkomcha)
- "I Was A Sparrow" (Shifchi)
- "Adam Was Alone - Reprise" (Mimkomcha)
- "Return Again"
- "Am Yisrael Chai"

== Critical reception ==
The Soul Doctor musical was reviewed by many publications following its openings in New York and Miami. Barbara Siegel in Theatre Mania wrote in her review: "The story is going to be compared to The Jazz Singer, but the engaging and often moving new musical has a good deal more thematic depth that its predecessor." Lisa Klug's review in Jewlicious.com concluded: "With plenty of good Jewish perspectives on the comedy of life, it had me laughing, singing and clapping ... it's so good ... [and] is only going to get better and better."

The show faced some criticism for not including the allegations of sexual abuse among the controversies that emerged during and after Carlebach's lifetime, and some critics characterized it as a "sanitized" account of his life. Scott Brown, in Vulture, wrote: "Soul Doctor was commissioned with the blessing of Carlebach’s surviving heirs, and maintains a steady, almost hypnotic adulation of its subject that leaves civilians so soothed they’re practically numb. (You’ll hear no mention of the posthumous sexual harassment charges lodged against Rabbi Shlomo. Drugs, sex, women: It’s all paved over with warm kugel.) Against all this reverent keening, Carlebach’s music, which has been adapted here with new lyrics, feels like a pleasant Epsom-salt bath."

Frank Scheck, in The New York Post, praised Eric Anderson's performance, writing: "Eric Anderson beautifully suggests Carlebach's soft-spoken, gentle appeal, as well as the charisma that jolted him to stardom. Erica Ash is equally superb as Simone, whether quietly conveying the singer's fierce dignity or delivering stunning versions of signature classics such as "Sinnerman." Jason Zinoman also praised Anderson's performance in The New York Times, writing: "Transforming from a mild-mannered rabbi into a kinetic dynamo, Anderson imbues his numbers with their own arc, often starting in a meditative mood before slowly building to a joyous, leaping roar."

Following its 2013 opening on Broadway, the Soul Doctor show was reviewed by The New York Times, Associated Press, The Hollywood Reporter, and Newsday, all of whom applauded Anderson's performance as Carlebach while comparing the show to Fiddler on the Roof and Hair, and giving overall mixed to positive reviews of the musical.

== Principal roles and original cast ==
Character	Original Broadway cast
Shlomo Carlebach	Eric Anderson
Nina Simone	Amber Iman
Mother	Jacqueline Antaramian
Father	Jamie Jackson
Eli Chaim	Ryan Strand
Moisheleh	Michael Paternostro
Ruth	Zarah Mahler
Reb Pinchas	Ron Orbach
Young Shlomo	Teddy Walsh
Young Eli Chaim	Melana Lloyd
Nazi	Colin Campbell McAdoo
Holy Hippie	J.C. Schuster
Holy Beggars	Dianna Barger, Tara Chambers, Maria Conti, Alexandra Frohlinger, Abdur-Rahim Jackson, Dillon Kondor, Vasthy Mompoint, Ian Paget, Heather Parcells, Eric J. Stockton, Richard Cerato, Afra Hines
