= Judy's Scary Little Christmas =

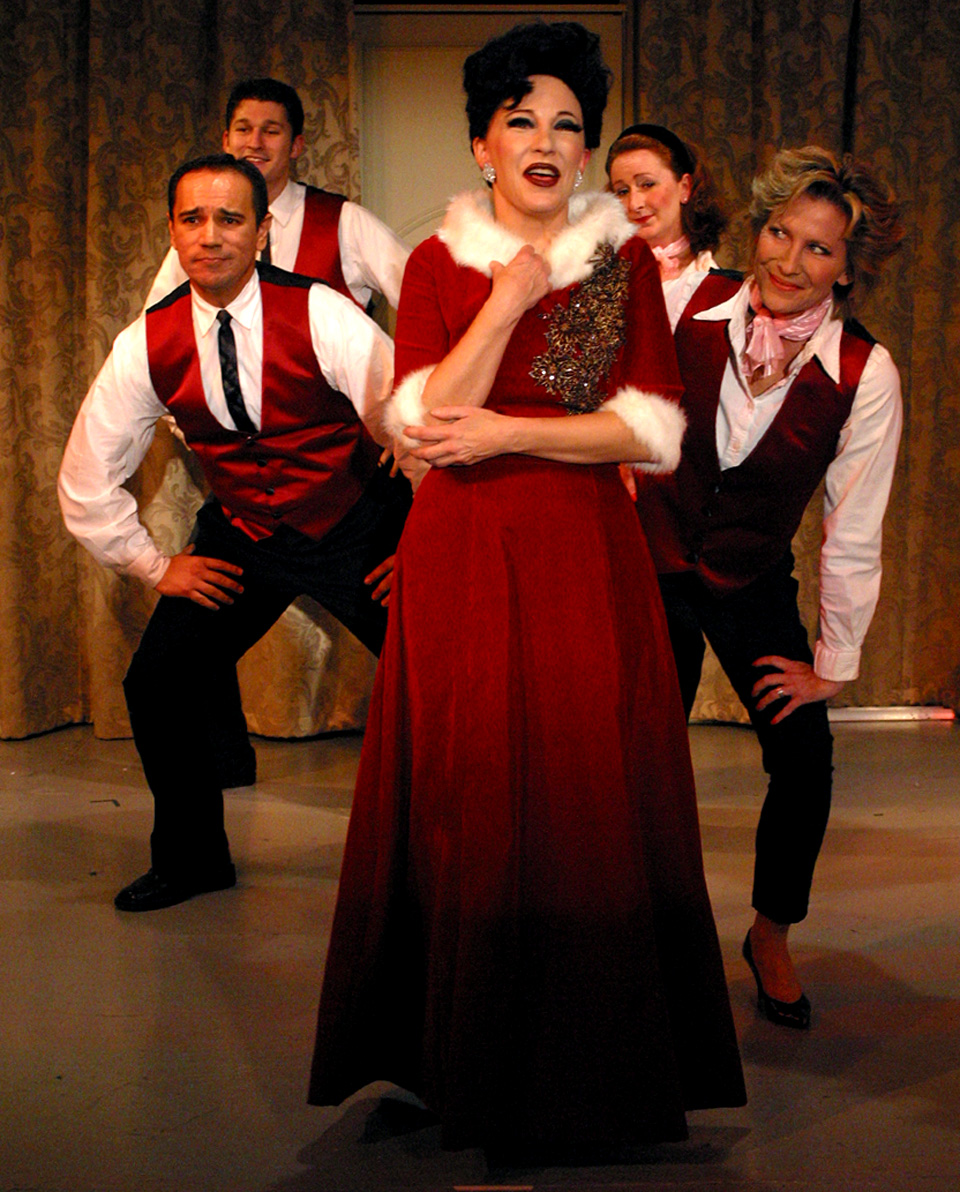
Connie Champagne as Judy Garland in Judy's Scary Little Christmas

Judy's Scary Little Christmas is an original musical written by James Webber and David Church, with music and lyrics by Joe Patrick Ward. It is a spoof on television variety shows of the 1950s, satirizing celebrities’ public images and private lives. The fictional story employs a metaphysical plot twist (as in the television series, The Twilight Zone) and spiritual redemption through a ghost (as in Charles Dickens’ novel, A Christmas Carol.) The show contains campy humor based on the sensationalized personal lives of the celebrities, with satirical references to pop culture and politics of the 1950s (including the Hollywood blacklist.)

== Synopsis ==
Judy Garland - the famous star of movie musicals known for her personal problems and show-business “comebacks” - is hosting a live television special on Christmas Eve, with guest stars Bing Crosby, Liberace, Ethel Merman, Richard Nixon, Lillian Hellman and Joan Crawford. Judy's guests smile and entertain when they're on-camera but reveal their egos and rivalries during the off-camera breaks. A number of technical things go wrong behind the scenes and a suspicious-looking figure is seen lurking in the wings. Halfway through the program, the uninvited figure of Death enters and tells them that they are actually in the present, not the past, and that they are all dead. He makes the celebrities remember and confess their reasons for coming back to the physical world before they return with him to judgment. Judy confesses, but refuses to leave until a sympathetic fan (a sailor who was Liberace's date) helps her to believe in her own legacy. She sings the song “Make It Shine,” and leaves the stage to her guests – now seen as redeemed spirits – before reappearing with Death in a trolley car to transport them all to heaven.

== Songs ==
"Back in Christmas Town" - Judy and Ensemble

"Let's Share a Cup of Irish Cheer" - Judy and Bing

"The Candy Cane Twist" - Liberace

"Mauna Loa Hula Holiday" - Ethel and Ensemble

"Life of the Party" - Judy, Liberace, Bing, Ethel, Nixon and Ensemble

"Angel Star" - Judy and "Punch" (puppet)

"Ever Been in Love?" - Nixon and Lillian Hellman

"Make It Shine" - Judy and Company

== The authors ==
James Webber and David Church (book) first collaborated at Emerson College, in Boston. Joe Patrick Ward (music and lyrics) also wrote songs for Hysterical Blindness & Other Southern Tragedies for actor Leslie Jordan and the book, music and lyrics for The Grave White Way, a spoof of bad musicals. He also composed the music for Sordid Lives: The Series.

== Production background ==
The first stage reading was directed by Leonard Foglia in January 2000 at the John Houseman Theatre Center in New York City, with Isabel Keating as “Judy Garland,” Kelly Bishop as “Lillian Hellman” and Jan Maxwell as “Joan Crawford” in the cast. Keating repeated the role in a December 2000 reading at the Arc Light Theatre in New York, also directed by Leonard Foglia. Isabel Keating received a Tony Award nomination in 2004 for playing “Judy Garland” in the Broadway musical The Boy From Oz, which opened in October, 2003.

Judy's Scary Little Christmas was first produced at the Victory Theatre Center in Burbank, California in November 2002. Kay Cole directed and choreographed the production. In 2003, actress and cabaret singer Connie Champagne won the L.A. Stage Ovation Award for Best Actress in a Musical for her performance as “Judy”. The show played the Court Theatre in West Hollywood, California in December, 2003. The original productions featured Eric Anderson (actor) as “Richard Nixon” and Lauri Johnson as “Ethel Merman.”

The show received nominations for Best Musical from the L.A. Weekly and Best World Premiere Musical from the Los Angeles Ovation Awards.

A recording of the Original Los Angeles Cast was released on CD in 2005.
