= Charity Angél Dawson =

American actress

Charity Angél Dawson is an American singer and actress known for performances in musical theatre roles, especially Becky in Broadway and touring productions of Waitress.

== Early life ==
Dawson is from Tulsa, Oklahoma. She was conflicted as a teen between pursuing a career in theatre or becoming a chef. She is a graduate of the American Musical and Dramatic Academy.

== Career ==
Dawson's Broadway debut was in Side Show.

Dawson joined the cast of Waitress as Nurse Norma before it went to Broadway, and understudied Becky in the American Repertory Theatre production in Cambridge before transferring to Broadway. She assumed the role of Becky in October 2016. She played Becky in the Waitress national tour in 2017; her performance as Becky was praised by Rohan Preston of the Minnesota Star Tribune.

Following the COVID-19 pandemic, Dawson played Becky when Waitress reopened on Broadway. She also appears as Becky in the film Waitress: The Musical (2023).

In 2021, Dawson originated the role of Wanda Sellner in Mrs. Doubtfire on Broadway. From August 2022 to June 2023, she played Mama Morton in Chicago on Broadway. In 2023, she was Clio, one of the Muses, in Disney's Hercules at the Paper Mill Playhouse. Dawson played Angelique in & Juliet on Broadway from January to June 2024.

She was set to perform as Sarah's Friend in the Broadway revival of Ragtime that opened in September 2025, but had to withdraw due to injury.

== Personal life ==
Dawson is a pescatarian.
