= Dakin Matthews =

American actor

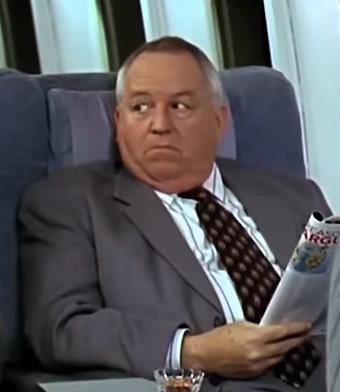
- Matthews in Bean (1997)
- Born: Melvin Richard Matthews; November 7, 1940 (age 85); Oakland, California, U.S.
- Occupations: Actor; director; scholar
- Years active: 1965–present
- Spouse: Anne Marie McNaughton (m. 1969)
- Children: 4

Melvin Richard "Dakin" Matthews (born November 7, 1940) is an American actor, playwright, theatre director, and theatrical scholar. He is best known as Herb Kelcher in My Two Dads (1987–1989), Hanlin Charleston in Gilmore Girls (2000–2007), Joe Heffernan in The King of Queens (1998-2007), and as Reverend Sikes in Desperate Housewives (2004–2012).

== Early life ==
Melvin Richard Matthews was born in Oakland, California. He initially aspired to become a Roman Catholic priest, studying in San Francisco and then at Gregorian University in Rome in the 1960s. However, his growing interest in drama led him to the Juilliard School, where he taught, among others, Kevin Kline and Patti LuPone.

He acted and taught at the American Conservatory Theater (A.C.T.) in San Francisco where Annette Bening was one of his students.

He also attended graduate school at New York University. He is an Emeritus Professor of English at California State University, East Bay in Hayward, California.

== Career ==
He began his stage career in 1965 in the San Francisco Bay Area, appearing in both the Marin and California Shakespeare Festivals, eventually becoming a member of the acting ensemble of the American Conservatory Theater. In the late 1980s, settling permanently in Los Angeles, Matthews began guest-starring in television series and appearing in films. He starred in series such as Down Home, Soul Man and, most successfully, The Jeff Foxworthy Show.

In 1989 he starred in the preshow for EPCOT Center's Body Wars attraction in The Wonders Of Life Pavilion. He also has made many guest appearances on television, including Remington Steele, Dallas, Murder She Wrote, L.A. Law, The Nanny, True Blood, Just Shoot Me!, Star Trek: Voyager, The West Wing, Gilmore Girls (as Headmaster Charleston), Ally McBeal, Coach, The Practice, Who's the Boss?, Charmed, Diagnosis Murder, The King of Queens (as Doug Heffernan's father Joe), NYPD Blue, Desperate Housewives (appearing in every Season except 5 as Reverend Sykes), House M.D. (appearing in 2004 in "Damned If You Do" the 5th episode of the 1st season playing the role of Marvin/Santa Claus), The Big Bang Theory as Santa (season 6 episode 11), Blue Bloods (as of 2016 appearing in "Help Me Help You" the 16th episode of the 6th season playing the role of Judge Wilson), Two and a Half Men, and Carnivàle.

Matthews has appeared in more than 25 feature films, including Nuts, Like Father Like Son, Clean and Sober, Thirteen Days, Funny Farm, True Grit (as Colonel Stonehill), Steven Spielberg's' Lincoln, Flubber, and Zero Charisma. He played the role of Col. Cochrane in Child's Play 3, and has also appeared in a number of television films, including And the Band Played On, Baby M, and White Mile.

As a stage actor, he is known for his many Shakespearean roles, especially King Lear, Bottom, and Falstaff, and most recently for his portrayals of C. S. Lewis in South Coast Repertory's Shadowlands, as "Warwick" in Shakespeare's Henry IV at the Lincoln Center Theater, as "Undershaft" in Major Barbara and "Tarleton" in Misalliance for South Coast Repertory, as "The Fixer" in Water and Power for the Center Theatre Group in Los Angeles, as "Leonato" in Shakespeare Center L.A.'s production of Much Ado About Nothing with Helen Hunt, as "Cardinal Wolsey" in A Man For All Seasons with Frank Langella at the Roundabout, and as "Senator Carlin" in Gore Vidal's The Best Man on Broadway.

In 2010, Matthews joined the cast of the ABC soap opera General Hospital as Judge Peter Carroll, the judge in Sonny Corinthos' trial.

He is also a playwright, director, and theater scholar who has published books and articles on Shakespeare and translations of 17th-century Spanish theater. He has been a dramaturg on numerous theatrical productions, including the 2005 Broadway revival of Julius Caesar starring Denzel Washington and the 2003 revival of Henry IV, winning a Drama Desk Award Special Award for his adaptation of the latter.

Matthews was also Artistic Director of the Berkeley Shakespeare Festival, the California Actors Theatre, The Antaeus Theatre Company (which he co-founded in 1991), and the Andak Stage Company; he is an Associate Artist of the Old Globe Theatre; and a founding member of the John Houseman's The Acting Company and Sam Mendes' Bridge Project.

Matthews appeared in the 2009 world tour of The Bridge Project as "Pishchick" in The Cherry Orchard and "Antigonus" in The Winter's Tale. In the 2011 summer season of The Public Theater's Shakespeare in the Park, he performed as "the Provost" in Measure for Measure and "Lafew" in All's Well That Ends Well. and as "Sir Humphrey" in the American premiere of Yes Prime Minister at the Kirk Douglas Theatre. He was nominated for an Ovation Award for Book and Lyrics of an original musical entitled Liberty Inn, which he co-wrote with B. T. Ryback.

In 2011, his verse translation of The Capulets & The Montagues played at the Andak Stage Company and the International Siglo de Oro Festival, winning the L.A. Drama Critics Circle Award for Best Adaptation. Matthews appeared twice as Santa Claus in The Big Bang Theory season 6 episode, "The Santa Simulation" and season 8 episode "The Clean Room Infiltration".

He was the dramaturg for the Lincoln Center production of Macbeth (2013), directed by Jack O'Brien and starring Ethan Hawke. He appeared as "Richard Russell" in Robert Schenkkan's award-winning L.B.J. play All The Way, starring Bryan Cranston, at A.R.T. in Cambridge in September 2013.

He appeared as "Mickey Goldmill" in the Broadway musical Rocky the Musical in 2014, then in 2015, he went on to play Winston Churchill opposite Helen Mirren as Queen Elizabeth II in Peter Morgan's The Audience on Broadway. Matthews portrayed Judge Byers in the 2015 film Bridge of Spies.

He originated the role "Joe" in the musical Waitress that opened on Broadway in April 2016. He returned to the role for the 2021 restaging on Broadway. From 2018 to 2020 and for a limited engagement in January 2022, he played Judge Taylor in To Kill a Mockingbird. In 2023, he played the dual role of Merlyn/Pellinore in the fourth Broadway revival of Camelot. From February to April 2026, he played Matthew Harrison Brady in Inherit the Wind at Arena Stage.

== Filmography ==
| Year | Title | Role | Notes |
|---|---|---|---|
| 1985 | Remington Steele | Michael Fleming | |
| 1986 | St. Elsewhere | | |
| 1986 | Fresno | Prosecutor | |
| 1987 | Easy Street | Tim Weathergate | |
| 1987 | Matlock | Prosecutor | Episode: "The People vs. Matlock" |
| 1987 | Like Father Like Son | Old Man Morrison | |
| 1987 | Nuts | 1st Judge | |
| 1987–1989 | My Two Dads | Herb Kelcher | |
| 1988 | Hostile Witness | Catlett | |
| 1988 | Newhart | Jim | |
| 1988 | Aaron's Way | Wyler | |
| 1988 | Permanent Record | Mr. McBain | |
| 1988 | Sunset | William Singer | |
| 1988 | Funny Farm | Marion Corey, Jr. | |
| 1988 | Clean and Sober | Bob | |
| 1988 | Something Is Out There | Agent Simon | |
| 1988 | Dallas | Detective Kane | |
| 1988 | TV 101 | Tanner | |
| 1988 | Dear John USA | David Hennessey | |
| 1989 | Naked Lie | Adam Berger | |
| 1989 | American Playhouse | Sam Mitgang | |
| 1989 | Guts and Glory: The Rise and Fall of Oliver North | Edwin Meese | TV movie |
| 1989 | Out on the Edge | Dr. Cutler | |
| 1989 | Wired | Washington Post Editor | |
| 1989 | The Fabulous Baker Boys | Charlie | |
| 1989 | Body Wars | Mission Commander | |
| 1989 | Cross of Fire | Hiram Evans | |
| 1989 | Christine Cromwell | Carter Dickinson III | |
| 1989 | My Brother's Wife | Charles Rusher | TV movie |
| 1989–1991 | Doctor Doctor | Dr. Harold Stratford | |
| 1990 | Blind Faith | Uncle Gene | |
| 1990 | Ghost Dad | Mr. Seymour | |
| 1990 | Fine Things | Judge Aaron S. Mitofsky | |
| 1990–1991 | Down Home | Walt McCrorey | |
| 1991 | The Whereabouts of Jenny | Cox | TV movie |
| 1991 | Eve of Destruction | Singleton | |
| 1991 | Who's the Boss? | Judge | |
| 1991 | The Perfect Tribute | Dr. Thomas | |
| 1991 | White Hot: The Mysterious Murder of Thelma Todd | DA Buron Fitts | TV movie |
| 1991 | Jailbirds | Sheriff | TV movie |
| 1991 | Child's Play 3 | Col. Cochrane | |
| 1991 | ...And Then She Was Gone | Francis Haynes | TV movie |
| 1991 | The Company | Director Waugh | TV movie |
| 1991–1992 | Drexell's Class | Roscoe Davis | TV movie |
| 1992 | Murder without Motive: The Edmund Parry Story | Howards | TV movie |
| 1992 | For Richer, for Poorer | Larry | TV movie |
| 1992 | Grave Secrets: The Legacy of Hilltop Drive | Attorney | TV movie |
| 1992 | Revolver | Tom McCall | TV movie |
| 1992 | Criminal Behavior | Albee Ferguson | TV movie |
| 1993 | The Temp | Dr. Feldman | |
| 1993 | Undercover Blues | Police Captain | |
| 1994 | The Swan Princess | King William | Voice |
| 1997 | Bean | Tucker, Passenger | |
| 1997 | Flubber | Minister | |
| 1998 | The Siege | Senator Wright | |
| 1999 | Star Trek: Voyager | Admiral Patterson | Episode: "Relativity" |
| 2000 | The West Wing | Simon Blye | Episode: Take Out The Trash Day |
| 2000 | Thirteen Days | Arthur C. Lundahl | |
| 2000-2007 | Gilmore Girls | Headmaster Hanlin Charleston | 10 episodes |
| 2001-2007 | The King of Queens | Joe Heffernan | 13 episodes |
| 2002 | Charmed | Angel of Destiny | Episode: "Witch Way Now?" |
| 2003 | The Fighting Temptations | Mr. Fairchild | |
| 2004 | House M.D. | Marvin | Episode: “Damned If You Do” |
| 2004-2012 | Desperate Housewives | Rev. Sikes | 9 episodes |
| 2010 | Parks and Recreation | David Moser | Episode: "Summer Catalog" |
| 2010 | True Grit | Col. Stonehill | |
| 2010 | True Blood | Dr Robideaux | Season 3, Episodes: “It Hurts Me Too” & “Fresh Blood” |
| 2011 & 2013 | The Mentalist | Professor Christo Papadakis | Episodes: "Red Queen" & "Red in Tooth and Claw" |
| 2011 | Two and a Half Men | Father Shaunassey | Episode: "That Darn Priest" |
| 2012 | Lincoln | Secretary John Palmer Usher | |
| 2012 | The Big Bang Theory | Santa | |
| 2012 | Castle | Santa | |
| 2013 | Mr. Box Office | Ernie | |
| 2013 | Devious Maids | Alfred Pettigrove | 2 episodes |
| 2015 | Bridge of Spies | Judge Byers | |
| 2016 | Gilmore Girls: A Year in the Life | Headmaster Hanlin Charleston | |
| 2023 | The Gilded Age | Mr. Winterton | |
| 2023 | Waitress | Joe | Live stage recording of musical |

== Theater ==
=== As an actor ===
| Year | Title | Role | Notes |
|---|---|---|---|
| 1993 | Shadowlands | C.S. Lewis | South Coast Repertory |
| 1998 | Freedomland | Noah Underfinger | Playwrights Horizons, Off-Broadway |
| 2003 | Major Barbara | Andrew Undershaft | South Coast Repertory |
| 2003 | Henry IV | Chief Justice Warwick/Owen Glendower | Vivian Beaumont Theater, Broadway |
| 2008 | A Man For All Seasons | Cardinal Wolsey | American Airlines Theatre, Broadway |
| 2009 | The Winter's Tale | Antigonus | Harvey Theatre, Off-Broadway |
| 2010 | Misalliance | John Tarleton | South Coast Repertory |
| 2010 | Much Ado About Nothing | Leonato | Shakespeare Center of Los Angeles |
| 2010 | King Lear | King Lear | Antaeus Theatre Company |
| 2011 | Where's Charley? | Stephen Spettigue | New York City Center, Off-Broadway |
| 2011 | Measure for Measure | Provost | Shakespeare in the Park, Off-Broadway |
| 2011 | All's Well That Ends Well | Lafew | Shakespeare in the Park, Off-Broadway |
| 2012 | The Best Man | Senator Clyde Carlin | Gerald Schoenfeld Theatre, Broadway |
| 2013 | All The Way | Richard Russell/Emanuel Celler | American Repertory Theater |
| 2013 | Yes, Prime Minister | Sir Humphrey Appleby | Kirk Douglas Theatre |
| 2014 | Rocky | Mickey | Winter Garden Theatre, Broadway |
| 2015 | The Audience | Winston Churchill | Gerald Schoenfeld Theatre, Broadway |
| 2016 | Waitress | Joe | Brooks Atkinson Theatre, Broadway |
| 2018 | The Iceman Cometh | Piet Wetjoen | Bernard B. Jacobs Theatre, Broadway |
| 2018 | To Kill A Mockingbird | Judge Taylor | Shubert Theatre, Broadway |
| 2021 | Waitress | Joe | Ethel Barrymore Theatre, Broadway |
| 2023 | Camelot | Merlyn/Pellinore | Vivian Beaumont Theater, Broadway |
| 2024 | Choice | Clark | McCarter Theatre Center |
| 2025 | Henry IV | King Henry IV | Theatre for a New Audience, Off-Broadway |
| 2026 | Inherit the Wind | Matthew Harrison Brady | Arena Stage |
| 2026 | An American Daughter | Senator Alan Hughes | La Femme Theatre |

=== As a dramaturg ===
| Year | Title | Notes |
|---|---|---|
| 2003 | Henry IV | Vivian Beaumont Theater, Broadway |
| 2005 | Julius Caesar | Belasco Theatre, Broadway |
| 2013 | Macbeth | Vivian Beaumont Theater, Broadway |
