= Jessie Nelson =

American film director

- Education: University of California Santa Cruz
- Occupations: Film director, screenwriter, producer, actress
- Spouse: Bryan Gordon
- Children: Molly Gordon

Jessie Nelson is an American film producer, director, actress and writer.

== Career ==
Nelson began her career acting with the theater group Mabou Mines at the Public Theater in New York and she went on to perform in Shakespeare In The Park.

Nelson began her directing career with the award-winning short film To the Moon, Alice (1990), which she also wrote. The film starred Chris Cooper and was part of a television program for Showtime titled The Showtime 30-Minute Movie.

Her first feature film was Corrina, Corrina (1994) which she wrote, directed, and produced. It starred Whoopi Goldberg and Ray Liotta. The film was suggested by her life. She went on to write, direct, and produce I Am Sam (2001) starring Sean Penn. Despite doing well at the box office, Nelson did not direct another film until Love the Coopers (2015). "The door did not open for me," she told The Hollywood Reporter in 2021. "Now, when you look at the statistics, so many women have had the experience that I've had, where they couldn't get their next movie made. At the time, you think, 'Is it something about me?' Or, 'Oh, doing a movie that wasn't successful, that's what puts people in directors' jail.' But for so many women at the time, it was just being a woman that put you in a different category."

She received the first Stanley Kramer Award from the Producers Guild for I Am Sam in 2002.

Her most recent film is Love the Coopers (2015), starring a large ensemble cast, including Diane Keaton, John Goodman, and Alan Arkin.

She co-wrote Stepmom (1998) and The Story of Us (1999), and co-wrote and produced Because I Said So and Fred Claus, the latter of which is based on a bedtime story she would tell her daughter. In 2014 she produced Danny Collins which starred Al Pacino and Annette Bening.

She wrote the Broadway musical adaptation of the movie Waitress with music and lyrics by Sara Bareilles, directed by Diane Paulus, which premiered on Broadway in April 2016. She also co-directed and co-produced the live film recording of the musical's 2021 remounting, which premiered at the Tribeca Film Festival in June 2023. She co-wrote and directed the musical Alice by Heart with Steven Sater and music by Duncan Sheik, which opened Off-Broadway in February 2019.

Nelson co-authored the 2011 children's book Labracadabra (Penguin, 2011, ISBN 9780670012510) with Karen Leigh Hopkins.

== Personal life ==
She is married to director Bryan Gordon. They have a daughter, actress Molly Gordon (b. 1995).

She is Jewish.

== Filmography ==
=== Film ===
Year	Title	Director	Writer	Producer	Notes
1991	To the Moon, Alice	Yes	Yes	No	Short film
1994	Corrina, Corrina	Yes	Yes	Yes	Directorial feature debut
1998	Stepmom	No	Yes	No	
1999	The Story of Us	No	Yes	Yes	
2001	I Am Sam	Yes	Yes	Yes	
2007	Because I Said So	No	Yes	Yes	
2007	Fred Claus	No	Story	Yes	
2015	Danny Collins	No	No	Yes	
2015	Love the Coopers	Yes	No	Yes	
2023	Waitress	No	Yes	Yes	Live film recording of her and Sara Bareilles' stage musical

Acting roles
Year	Title	Role
1988	Tucker: The Man and His Dream	Woman on Steps
1993	So I Married an Axe Murderer	Ralph
1999	The Story of Us	Realtor

=== Television ===
Year	Title	Director	Writer	Executive Producer	Notes
1987	Daniel and the Towers	No	Yes	No	Television film
1996	Chicago Hope	No	Story	No	Episode: ''Women on the Verge''
2005	Earth to America	No	Yes	No	Television special
2017	Curb Your Enthusiasm	Yes	No	No	Episode: ''Namaste''
2020	Little Voice	Yes	Yes	Yes	Creator and executive producer (9 episodes); Director (5 episodes); Writer (5 episodes)

Acting roles
Year	Title	Role	Notes
1993	The Switch	Elizabeth Garland	Television film
1994	Hoggs' Heaven	Poet	Television short film
1997	ER	Bite Victim's Mother	Episode: ''Ambush''
