= Brett Sullivan =

Australian filmmaker (born 1971)

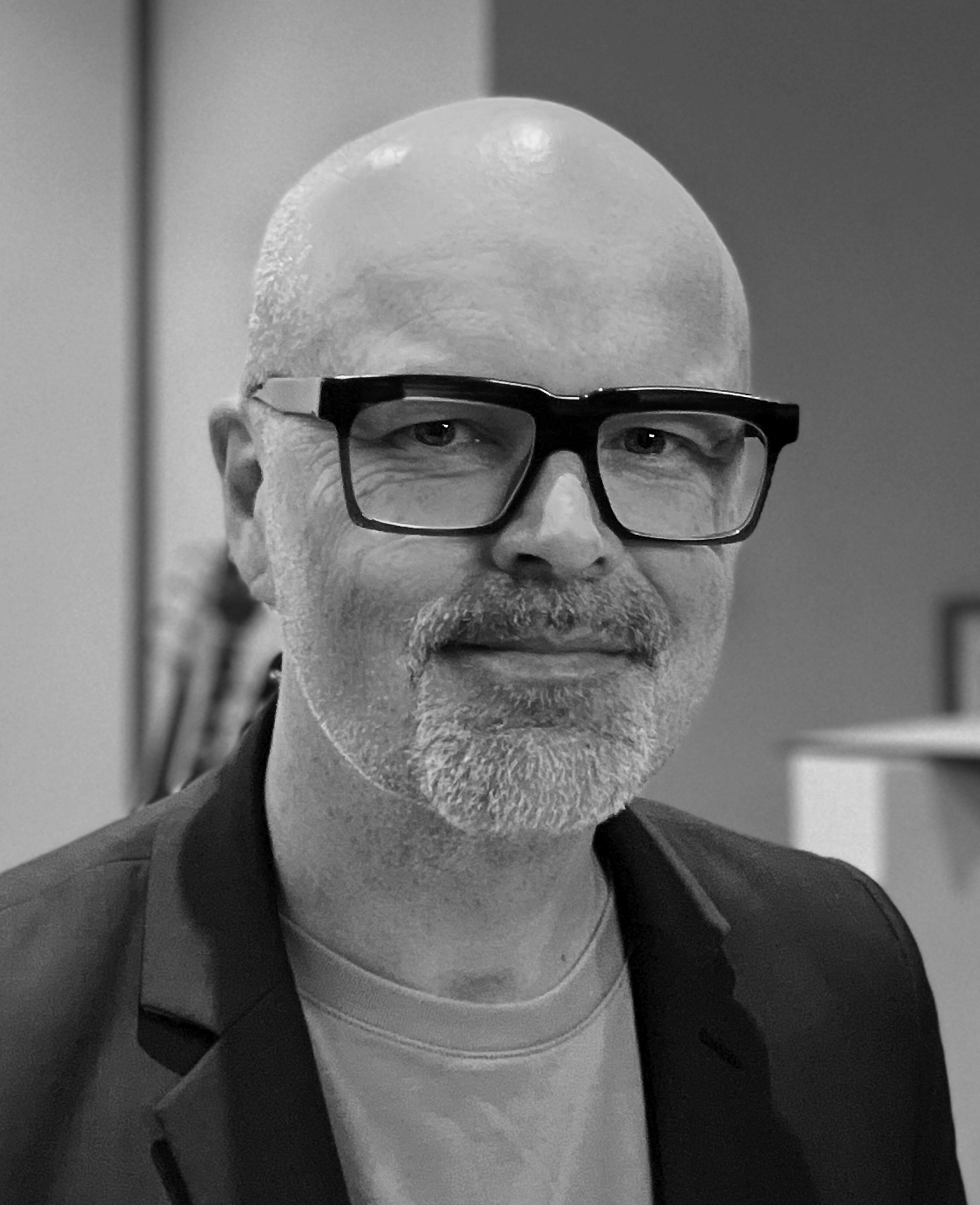
- Born: Brett Sullivan; 21 May 1971; Sydney, New South Wales, Australia
- Occupation: Director

Brett Sullivan is a London-based Australian filmmaker. Born in Sydney, Australia, 1971, Sullivan formed production company Steam Motion and Sound with Julian Chow in 1996. Steam established a UK office in 2003, and a New York office in 2014 with co-founder Clayton Jacobsen.

Sullivan has directed and produced stage to screen films or "pro-shots" for multiple Broadway and West End productions. His work includes Billy Elliot the Musical Live which was the first live event cinema release to top the UK box office and set a new box office record for live event cinema. Sullivan's next live film Miss Saigon surpassed Billy Elliot. In the USA, Disney's Newsies Live! set a new US box office record for a live musical event at the cinema. Frozen: The Broadway Musical reached number 1 streaming movies on Disney+ in Australia, UK, and USA in June 2025. In July 2026 Hadestown: The Musical surpassed Hamilton for the highest grossing live theatre film in the US.

He has directed and produced music videos, TV specials, commercials for David Byrne, Alicia Keys, Michael Bublé, Bruno Mars, Natalie Merchant, Jason Derulo, Phil Collins, James Blunt, Robert Plant, Madonna, REM, Linkin Park, Ed Sheeran, Seal, Bette Midler, Flaming Lips,Cher, Ben Folds, André Rieu, Muse, KD Lang, Green Day, Red Hot Chili Peppers, Rihanna, David Gray, LP, Idina Menzel, Nile Rodgers, Pablo Alboran, Josh Groban, Lenny Kravitz, Eric Clapton and others. Other commercial work includes Deezer, Vodafone, Pepsi, Reebok, Orange, Adidas, Ikea, and Coca-Cola.

Sullivan was a co-founder of Adstream (2001), digital media and asset management company for advertising agencies. It is located in 17 countries.

== Film ==
=== As director ===
- The Phantom of the Opera - 2026 - Universal Pictures
- Stranger Things: The First Shadow - 2026 - Broadway - Netflix
- Starlight Express - 2026 - Universal Pictures
- Hadestown - 2026 - Bleecker Street
- Frozen - 2025 - The Broadway Musical - Disney Theatrical Group - Disney+
- Aladdin - 2027 - Live on West End in London - Disney Theatrical Group - Disney+
- Kiss Me, Kate - 2024 - Live at the Barbican - BBC / Trafalgar Releasing
- The Prince of Egypt - 2023 - Live on West End in London - Universal Pictures/DreamWorks Theatricals - Cinema
- Waitress - 2023 - Live on Broadway in New York - Bleecker Street - Cinema
- Kinky Boots - 2019 - Live on West End in London - BroadwayHD - Cinema
- Newsies - 2017 - Live in Hollywood - Disney Theatrical Group - Cinema/Disney+
- Tour Stop 148 - Michael Bublé - 2016 - Warner Bros. Records - Cinema/Home Video
- Miss Saigon - Live on West End in London - 2016 - Universal Pictures/Cameron Mackintosh - Cinema/Home Video
- Billy Elliot the Musical - 2014 - Live on West End in London - Universal Pictures/Working Title Films - Cinema/Home Video
- Love Never Dies - 2014 - Feature - Universal Pictures / Really Useful Group - Cinema/Home Video
- Special When Lit, Feature Documentary 2010, Best Documentary United Los Angeles Film Festival, Nominated Best Documentary Raindance, Official Selection at Calgary international Film Festival, Vancouver International Film Festival, Atlanta International Documentary Film Festival, Hot Springs Documentary Festival, Buffalo Niagara International Film Festival, Bronx International Film Festival, Indianapolis international Film Festival, New York United Film Festival, London United Film Festival, Wisconsin Film Festival, Tallahassee Film Festival, Big Sky Documentary Film Festival. Aired in USA on Documentary Channel 2011, aired in the UK on PBS 2011.

=== Producer ===
- Bonnie & Clyde: The Musical - Live in London - 2024 - David Treatman Creative
- Heathers The Musical - 2022 - Village Roadshow / BK Studios / Roku
- Audra McDonald - I Am What I Am - 2024 - PBS
- Jesus Christ Superstar Arena Tour - Universal Pictures - DVD
- The Phantom of the Opera at the Royal Albert Hall - Universal Pictures - Cinema/DVD
- Les Misérables: The 25th Anniversary Concert Live - Universal Pictures - Cinema/DVD

== Selected music work ==
- Director - Michael Bublé - Cry Me A River, Crazy Love, Santa Claus Is Coming To Town, To Love Somebody, You Make Me Feel So Young
- Director - School of Rock The Musical - You're in the Band - 360 Video
- Director - Seal - Everytime I'm With You, Do You Ever
- Director - Hamilton - Alexander Hamilton featuring Lin-Manuel Miranda - in 3D for Hamilton Exhibition. Co-directed with Thomas Kail
- Director - Emin featuring Nile Rodgers - Boomerang, Baby Get Higher, Got Me Good, Let Me Go featuring Robin Schulz
- Director - Greg Holden - Boys In The Street
- Director - Pablo Alborán - Recuérdame
- Director - Idina Menzel & Michael Bublé - Baby, It's Cold Outside
- Director - Robert Plant - Rainbow
- Director - James Blunt - Satellites, Blue on Blue
- Director - LP - Tokyo Sunrise
- Co-Director - Michael Bublé's Day Off - ITV/Warner Music
- Co-Director with Marc Klasfeld - Michael Bublé - Close Your Eyes
- Director - Josh Groban - I Believe (When I Fall In Love), What I Did For Love, Somewhere Over the Rainbow
- Director - Phil Collins - Going Back, Heatwave
- Director - A Conversation With Phil Collins TV Special
- Director - Natalie Merchant - doc - Leave Your Sleep
- Director - Natalie Merchant Live Session - Man In The Wilderness
- Director - A Conversation with Michael Bublé TV Special
- Director - Birdy - Birdy Live at The Chapel
- Director - Katherine Jenkins - Angel
- Producer - Eric Clapton EPK and A Conversation With Eric Clapton TV Special
- Director - Donkeyboy - Ambitions
- Director - Rumer - PF Sloan, Slow (International Version)
- Director - Emin - Baby Get Higher
- Director - Gnarls Barkley - Crazy - Graphics version
- Creative Director - International TV Campaigns for Madonna 'Confessions on a Dancefloor', 'Hard Candy', 'Confessions Live'
- Creative Director - International TV Campaigns for Bette Midler, It's The Girls!
- Creative Director - International TV Campaigns for FUN., Some Nights
- Creative Director - International TV Campaigns for Michael Bublé 'Call Me Irresponsible', 'Caught In The Act', 'Crazy Love', 'Christmas', To Be Loved
- Creative Director - International TV Campaigns for R.E.M. - Live, Accelerate, Collapse Into Now
- Creative Director - International TV Campaigns for Green Day - American Idiot, Bullet In A Bible, 21st Century Breakdown, Awesome as F**K, Uno - Dos - Tres
- Creative Director - International TV Campaigns for Red Hot Chili Peppers - Stadium Arcadium
- Director - My Chemical Romance UK TV Campaign - Winner Best Music TV Commercial UKMVA's 2010
- Producer - Robert Plant Band of Joy UK TV Campaign - Nominated Best Music TV Commercial UKMVA's 2010
- Producer - David Garrett - Viva La Vida

== Other ==
Sullivan wrote the book, music and lyrics for The Last Word, a musical staged at the 2016 New York Musical Festival. The musical was directed by Michael Bello, choreographed by Nick Kenkel, and additional lyrics by Ryan Cunningham. It was nominated for Best Choreography, and Best Supporting Actress in the festival awards. An episodic podcast of the musical was recorded and released in 2022. It received Silver at the 2023 The New York Festivals Radio Awards.

Sullivan played in Australian indie bands Broken Words, Mockingbird and Easy Brother.
