= The Wild Party =

The Wild Party may refer to:

- The Wild Party (poem), a 1928 epic poem by Joseph Moncure March
- The Wild Party (1923 film), a film with cinematography by Clyde De Vinna
- The Wild Party (1929 film), a film based on the novel Unforbidden Fruit by Samuel Hopkins Adams
- The Wild Party (1956 film), a film starring Anthony Quinn
- The Wild Party (1975 film), a Merchant-Ivory film starring James Coco and Raquel Welch, based on March's poem
- The Wild Party (LaChiusa musical), a 2000 Broadway musical based on March's poem
- The Wild Party (Lippa musical), a 2000 off-Broadway musical based on March's poem
