= Doctors of the Dark Side =

- Directed by: Martha Davis
- Written by: Mark Jonathan Harris
- Produced by: Martha Davis
- Starring: Diane Davis; Gian-Murray Gianino; Lee Aaron Rosen; Joe Tippett; Rafael Wurzel
- Narrated by: Mercedes Ruehl
- Cinematography: Lisa Rinzler
- Edited by: M. Trevino
- Music by: Maxim Moston
- Distributed by: Shelter Island
- Release date: 2011
- Running time: 73 minutes
- Country: US
- Language: English

Doctors of the Dark Side is a documentary about the role of physicians and psychologists in the torture of prisoners. The movie tells the story of four detainees, and how healthcare professionals working for the United States Army and the Central Intelligence Agency implemented enhanced interrogation techniques, and covered up signs of torture at the Guantanamo Bay Detention Camp and Abu Ghraib Prison. Interviews with medical, legal and intelligence experts and evidence from declassified government memos document how the torture of detainees could not continue without the assistance of doctors.
