= Christopher Fitzgerald (actor) =

American actor and singer (born 1972)

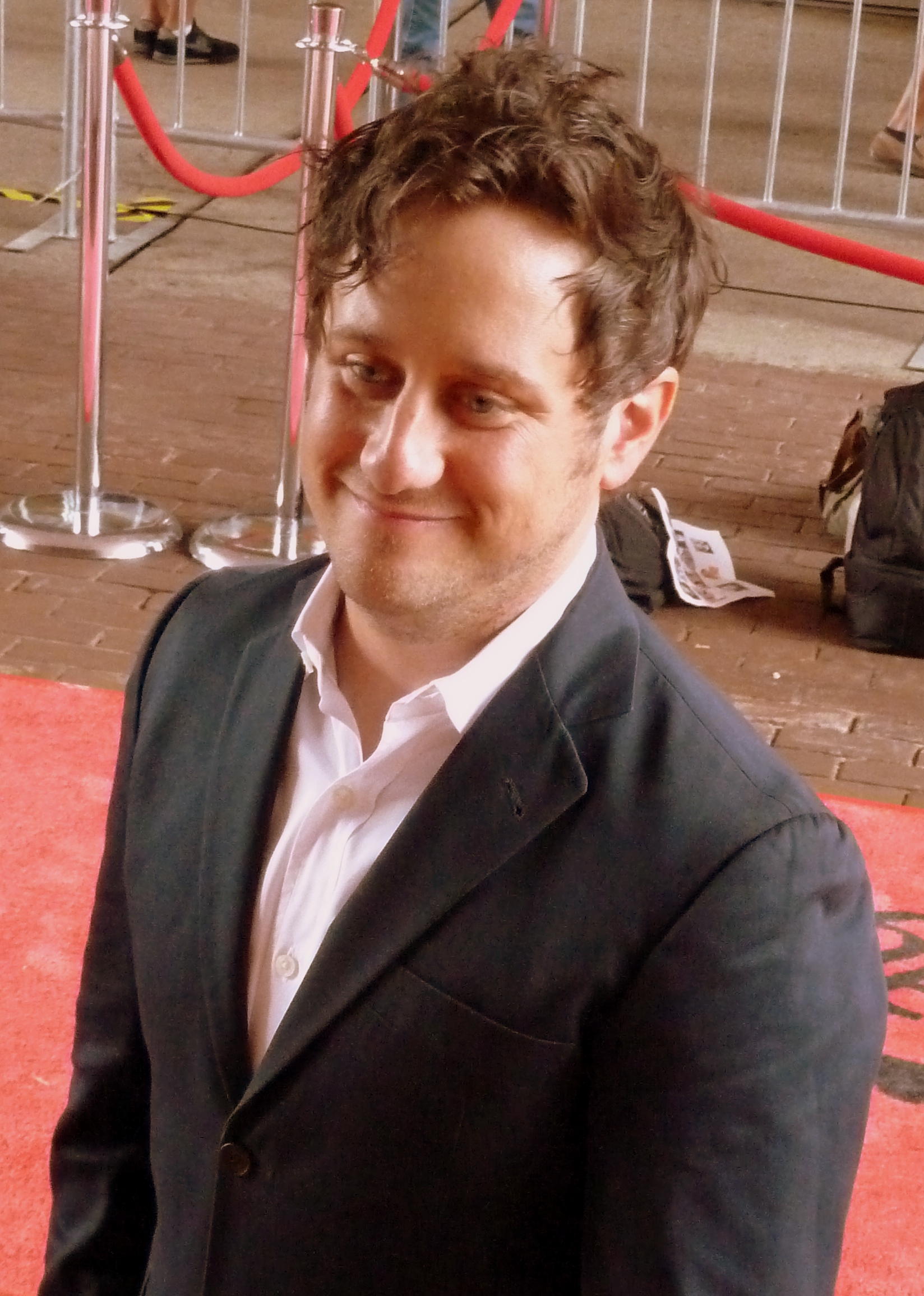
- Christopher Fitzgerald at the premiere of Imogene at Toronto Film Festival in 2012
- Born: Christopher Cantwell Fitzgerald; November 26, 1972 (age 53); Bryn Mawr, Pennsylvania
- Education: Rollins College (BA); American Conservatory Theater (MFA)
- Occupations: Actor, singer
- Years active: 1980–present
- Known for: Waitress; Young Frankenstein; Wicked
- Spouse: Jessica Stone (m. 2003)
- Children: 2

Christopher Cantwell Fitzgerald (born November 26, 1972) is an American actor and singer. He is known for his role as Boq in the musical Wicked, Igor in the musical Young Frankenstein, and Ogie Anhorn in the musical Waitress. He earned Outer Critics Circle Award, Drama Desk Award, and Tony Award nominations for his performances in Waitress and Young Frankenstein and won the Drama Desk Award and Outer Critics Circle Award for his performance in Waitress.

== Early life ==
Fitzgerald was born in Bryn Mawr, Pennsylvania, the son of Victoria D. Field, who worked for the American Kennel Club, and James W. Fitzgerald, Jr., a real estate agent at Coldwell Banker. He grew up in South Portland, Maine and attended Waynflete School in Portland in 1991. He graduated with a Bachelor of Arts in Theater from Rollins College in Winter Park, Florida. He is a member of Alpha Tau Omega fraternity. He also gained a master's degree in Fine Arts from the American Conservatory Theater in San Francisco.

He studied "techniques of clowning but also mime and storytelling, singing and comedy and everything. Juggling, balancing" at the Celebration Barn with Tony Montanaro in Maine.

== Career ==
=== Theatre ===
Fitzgerald started his acting career in 1980, at the age of eight, when he appeared as the youngest boy in Portland Player's production of Oliver!. From that time on, he worked steadily in community theater and Maine's New Vaudeville shows. In college, he began his career as a summer apprentice at Williamstown Theater Festival. At age 26, in 1998, he starred in his first off-Broadway show, the controversial Corpus Christi by acclaimed playwright Terrence McNally. In the same year, he also appeared in The Matchmaker by Williamstown Theatre Festival, as well as an off-Broadway staging of The Cripple of Inishmaan.

During the following year, Fitzgerald appeared in the Sondheim-Weidman musical Wise Guys. He also performed in a production of Babes in Arms, produced by Encores! in the New York City Center.

In 2000, Fitzgerald co-starred in the 1954 Sondheim musical Saturday Night. His performance in this show earned him his first award nomination, for the Drama Desk Award for Outstanding Featured Actor in a Musical. Also in 2000, Fitzgerald played the lead role in the one-man show Fully Committed, appearing until 2001.

In 2002, Fitzgerald opened in the musical Amour, adapted from a 1943 French short story written by Marcel Aymé. He performed from October 20, 2002 until November 3, 2002. His performance earned him another nomination for the Drama Desk Award for Outstanding Featured Actor in a Musical. On October 30, 2003, Fitzgerald premiered in the musical Wicked in the role of Boq. He departed the role on January 2, 2005 and was replaced by Jeffry Kuhn.

Fitzgerald was seen in Gutenberg! The Musical! directed by Alex Timbers from December 3, 2006, and ran until May 6, 2007. He appeared as the character "Igor" in the Broadway production of the Mel Brooks musical Young Frankenstein, which opened on Broadway in November 2007. For the role he received an Outer Critics Circle Award, Drama Desk Award, and a Tony Award nomination for Best Featured Actor in a Musical. Fitzgerald also played Igor in the musical's out-of-town tryouts in Seattle. During rehearsals for the show his wife gave birth to their first child, a boy named Charlie. Fitzgerald played his final performance as Igor in Young Frankenstein on November 23, 2008.

Fitzgerald played the title role in the world premiere of the burlesque-style musical Minsky's, in Los Angeles, which played at the Center Theatre in Ahmanson Theatre from January 21 – March 1, 2009, and also starred his former Young Frankenstein co-star Beth Leavel.

He played Og in the Broadway revival of Finian's Rainbow at the St. James Theatre. For this performance, Fitzgerald won the Drama Desk Award for Outstanding Featured Actor in a Musical. He and his wife also gave birth to a second child, a boy named Emmett. He also once more received an Outer Critics Circle Award May 2010 and a Tony Award nomination for Best Featured Actor in a Musical.

He starred as Pseudolus in an all-male production of Stephen Sondheim's A Funny Thing Happened on the Way to the Forum in his tenth season with the Williamstown Theatre Festival. The sold-out show closed on July 11, 2010. In November 2010 to February 2011 he played Launcelot Gobbo in The Merchant of Venice on Broadway.

He starred as P.T. Barnum in Barnum, revived by Cameron Mackintosh, premiering at the Chichester Festival Theatre in Chichester, West Sussex, UK from July 15 through August 31, 2013.

He played the role of Amos Hart in the Broadway production of Chicago, beginning October 28, 2013 and leaving on June 8, 2014. He then started playing Billy Flynn in the same production from August 5 to November 30, 2014.

In 2014, he was in a concert version of Guys and Dolls at Carnegie Hall playing Benny Southstreet. At the Williamstown Theatre Festival in July 2014 he played the role of Benny Fox in its production of June Moon. Christopher played the archangel Michael in the production of An Act of God starring Jim Parsons from May - August 2015 .

In March 2016, he joined the cast of Broadway transfer Waitress, playing the role of Ogie and stayed with the production on and off through 2021. In 2021, he also played David in the Broadway revival of Company. He played Patsy, Guard 2 and the Mayor in the 2023 Broadway revival of Spamalot.

=== Films ===
Fitzgerald's first film role was a bit part in the movie Boiler Room starring Vin Diesel and Ben Affleck. His next part was in the movie Personal Velocity: Three Portraits as Greg. Personal Velocity won two awards at the 2002 Sundance Film Festival, including Best Cinematography.

Fitzgerald starred in 2012's Girl Most Likely alongside Kristen Wiig, Annette Bening, Matt Dillon and Darren Criss.

He was also in the professionally shot stage recording of the musical Waitress, reprising his role of Ogie.

=== Television ===
On the television show Twins on The WB, Fitzgerald played the character of Neil, beginning in 2005. The show was cancelled on May 18, 2006, following the merger of The WB and UPN that created the new network The CW.

He appeared in full costume as an adult Cabbage Patch doll in a Geico insurance commercial.

In 2017, Fitzgerald played the role of J.J. Valentine in the Netflix limited series Godless, and played children's entertainer/child trafficker Sonny Shine in the SyFy fantasy black comedy crime series Happy!.

== Stage credits ==
Year	Title	Role	Notes
1985	Oliver!	Oliver Twist	Brunswick Music Theatre
1998	Corpus Christi	Thomas	Off-Broadway
1999	Babes in Arms	Performer	Off-Broadway
2000	Saturday Night	Bobby	Off-Broadway
2001	The Winter's Tale	Clown	Williamstown Theatre Festival
2002	Where's Charley?	Charley	Williamstown Theatre Festival
2002	Amour	Bertrand / Advocate / News Vendor	Broadway
2003-2005	Wicked	Boq	Broadway
2006-2007	Gutenberg! The Musical!	Bud Davenport	Off-Broadway
2007-2008	Young Frankenstein	Igor	Broadway
2009-2010	Finian's Rainbow	Og	Broadway
2010	A Funny Thing Happened on the Way to the Forum	Pseudolus	Williamstown Theatre Festival
2010-2011	The Merchant of Venice	Launcelot Gobbo	Broadway
2013	Barnum	P.T. Barnum	Chichester Festival Theatre
2013-2014	Chicago	Amos Hart	Broadway
2014	Die Fledermaus	Frosch	Metropolitan Opera
2014	Guys and Dolls	Benny Southstreet	Carnegie Hall
2014	Chicago	Billy Flynn	Broadway
2014	Show Boat	Frank Schultz	Avery Fisher Hall
2015	An Act of God	Michael	Broadway
2015	A Funny Thing Happened on the Way to the Forum	Pseudolus	Two River Theater
2016-2017	Waitress	Ogie Anhorn	Broadway
2017	Babes in Toyland	Alan	Carnegie Hall
2018-2020	Waitress	Ogie Anhorn	Broadway
2019	Let 'Em Eat Cake	The Narrator / Tweedledee	Carnegie Hall
2020	Company	David	Broadway
2021	Waitress	Ogie Anhorn	Broadway
2021-2022	Company	David	Broadway
2023	Dear World	Sewerman	Off-Broadway
2023-2024	Spamalot	Patsy / Mayor of Finland / Guard 2	Broadway
2025	Urinetown	Officer Barrel	Encores!

== Awards and nominations ==
Year	Award	Category	Nominated work	Result
2000	Drama Desk Award	Outstanding Featured Actor in a Musical	Saturday Night	Nominated
2003	Drama Desk Award	Outstanding Featured Actor in a Musical	Amour	Nominated
2008	Tony Award	Best Featured Actor in a Musical	Young Frankenstein	Nominated
2008	Drama Desk Award	Outstanding Featured Actor in a Musical	Young Frankenstein	Nominated
2008	Outer Critics Circle Award	Outstanding Featured Actor in a Musical	Young Frankenstein	Nominated
2008	Broadway.com Audience Award	Favorite Featured Actor in a Broadway Musical	Young Frankenstein	Won
2010	Tony Award	Best Featured Actor in a Musical	Finian's Rainbow	Nominated
2010	Drama Desk Award	Outstanding Featured Actor in a Musical	Finian's Rainbow	Won
2010	Outer Critics Circle Award	Outstanding Featured Actor in a Musical	Finian's Rainbow	Nominated
2016	Tony Award	Best Featured Actor in a Musical	Waitress	Nominated
2016	Drama Desk Award	Outstanding Featured Actor in a Musical	Waitress	Won
2016	Outer Critics Circle Award	Outstanding Featured Actor in a Musical	Waitress	Won
