= Daniel Wise (playwright) =

American dramatist

Daniel S. Wise is an American playwright, director, producer and author.

== Professional life ==
Born in Chicago April 5, 1969, his productions have been presented New York City, on and off Broadway, as well as in Japan, Russia, China, South Korea, Taiwan, Singapore, Britain and South Africa.

He pioneered the first major Broadway production in Russia (42nd Street, Moscow 2001-2002); and the first Broadway musical in China as a joint production with the China Ministry of Culture (Rent, 2005-2007 featuring the Broadway cast with Karen Mok); as well as the Blues Brothers International Tour; and several international jazz, music and theatre festivals, including Chuck Berry's international tour of 50 Years of Rock 'N Roll.

As artistic director of the Philharmonia Europa, he brought Eastern European (mainly Ukrainian) musicians together with an American cast for a two-year North American tour of Troika/Columbia Artists Management's The Music of Andrew Lloyd Webber, starring Michael Bolton. He produced The Gathering on Broadway, a play about a Holocaust survivor's personal struggle in coming to terms with the next generation of Jews and Germans, starring Hal Linden; and a new musical comedy based on Anton Chekhov's The Seagull for the 2005 New York Theater Festival (with the Russian composer Alexander Zurabin, and American director Lewis J. Stadlin); as well as a production of the Peking Opera's The Monkey King, at the Lincoln Center. Wise has collaborated on original works with Joseph Stein, Sheldon Harnick, Marvin Hamlisch, Stephen Schwartz, David Shire, Elizabeth Swados and Franco Zeffirelli. Currently he is playwright and director of Soul Doctor, a new Broadway musical about the life of the father of contemporary Jewish Music Shlomo Carlebach, which opened at Circle in the Square Theatre, in August 2013 to rave reviews.

== Personal life ==
Wise was born in Chicago and grew up in New York City as a yeshiva student . He studied the violin with Vladimir Zyskind. While in his teens, he began writing freelance journalism for newspapers and comedy shorts for television. He went on to study Talmudic jurisprudence at the Rabbinical College of Canada, where he was ordained by the Chief Rabbi of Montreal Pinhas Hirschprung. He published a multi-volume codification of Talmudic law, which is studied as curriculum in many Talmudic academies.
