= Atlanta International Documentary Film Festival =

Film festival in Atlanta, Georgia, US

- Genre: Documentary film festival
- Frequency: Annual
- Locations: Atlanta, Georgia, United States
- Founded: 2006
- Website: http://www.atldoc.com/

The Atlanta Documentary Film Festival (also called ATL DOC, Atlanta DocuFest) is a film festival that screens documentary films in Atlanta, Georgia, United States. Paul Mariano's Also Ran was named Best Political Documentary at the 2006 festival. Don Wilson's Mississippi Son: A Filmmaker's Journey Home was named Best Dramatic Documentary at the 2007 festival. In 2009, Roger Nygard's The Nature of Existence was screened at the festival, as was Mike Ramsdell's The Anatomy of Hate: A Dialogue for Hope, which won the Audience Choice Award that year. LGBT documentary film It Doesn’t Define Us was screened at the 2010 festival. At the 2012 festival, Christine Anthony's and Owen Masterson's Grow! won the Audience Choice Award. Decadence: Decline of the Western World was named that year's Best Foreign Documentary.
