= Carlebach =

Carlebach is a surname. Notable people with the surname include:

- Elisheva Carlebach Jofen, American scholar of early modern Jewish history
- Emil Carlebach (1914–2001), German writer and journalist
- Ephraim Carlebach (1879–1936), German-born rabbi
- Ezriel Carlebach (1909–1956), Israeli journalist and editorial writer
- Felix Carlebach (1911–2008), Rabbi in Manchester, England
- Hartwig Naftali Carlebach (1889–1967), founder of the Carlebach Shul
- Joseph Carlebach (1883–1942), German rabbi, scholar and scientist
- Julius Carlebach, (1922–2001), German-British rabbi and scholar
- Michael L. Carlebach, American photographer and historian of photojournalism
- Naftoli Carlebach (1916–2005), rabbi and accountant
- Neshama Carlebach, singer
- Shlomo Carlebach (1925–1994), rabbi, religious teacher, composer, and singer
- Shlomo Carlebach (1925–2022), German-born American Haredi rabbi and scholar

== Other ==
- Carlebach minyan, Jewish prayer services in the style of Rabbi Shlomo Carlebach
- Carlebach movement, Orthodox Jewish movement inspired by the legacy of Rabbi Shlomo Carlebach
- Mevo Modi'im, a village in central Israel founded by Rabbi Shlomo Carlebach
