= Eli Chaim Carlebach =

American rabbi

Rabbi Eli Chaim Carlebach
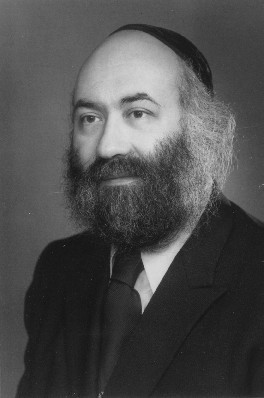
- Title: Rabbi

Personal life
- Born: Eliyahu Chaim Carlebach; January 14, 1925 Berlin, Prussia, Germany
- Died: March 23, 1990 (aged 65) New York City, New York, U.S.
- Spouse: Hadassa (Schneerson) Carlebach
- Parent: Rabbi Hartwig Naftali Carlebach (father)

Religious life
- Religion: Judaism

Jewish leader
- Predecessor: Hartwig Naftali Carlebach
- Position: Rabbi
- Synagogue: Congregation Kehilath Jacob "The Carlebach Shul" and Hillside Jewish Center

Eli Chaim Carlebach (1925–1990) was an American rabbi.

== Biography ==
He was born in 1925, to Hartwig Naftali Carlebach and Paula (Pesse) Cohn. He was the twin brother of Shlomo Carlebach. The Carlebach family is a notable Jewish family originally from Germany that now lives all over the world. He studied at Yeshiva Mesivta Torah Vodaas, in Brooklyn, NY.

On March 16, 1949, he married Hadassah Schneerson. The wedding was attended by many great rabbis, including Rabbi Eliezer Silver. Hadassa's father, Schneour Zalman Schneersohn, was a first cousin of Levi Yitzchak Schneerson, the father of the 7th Lubavitcher Rebbe, Menachem Mendel Schneerson, who said the first 2 blessings under his wedding chupah. Hadassah is a second cousin of Menachem Mendel Schneerson.

His daughter Sterna Citron wrote a book about her fathers stories.

== Career ==
After his father's death in 1967, Eli and his brother assumed the position of spiritual leaders of the Congregation Kehilath Jacob (Founded in 1945), the landmarked "Carlebach Shul," located on the Upper West Side of Manhattan. The synagogue was famous for its worshippers, young and old, female and male, traditional and liberal who participated in services there.

His grandson, Rabbi Naftali Citron, is the current Rabbi there.

He was also the rabbi at the Hillside Jewish Center in New Jersey.

He died of a heart attack at the age of 65.

== See also ==
- Ephraim Carlebach
