= Felix Carlebach =

Rabbi Felix Falk Carlebach

Personal life
- Born: April 15, 1911 Lübeck
- Died: January 23, 2008 (aged 96) Manchester, England
- Dynasty: Carlebach rabbinical family
- Education: University of Manchester
- Occupation: Rabbi, teacher

Religious life
- Religion: Judaism
- Denomination: Orthodox

Jewish leader
- Position: Rabbi
- Synagogue: South Manchester Synagogue
- Began: 1947
- Ended: 1984
- Other: Rabbi at Palmers Green and Southgate United Synagogue (1939–1947)
- Residence: Manchester, England
- Dynasty: Carlebach rabbinical family

Felix Falk Carlebach (15 April 1911 in Lübeck - 23 January 2008 in Manchester) was a German-born British rabbi in Manchester, England.

He was an honorary citizen of the city of Lübeck and had both German and British citizenship.

== Life ==
Carlebach descended from a well known German rabbinical family. He was the son of Simson Carlebach (1875–1942), a banker, and his wife Resi née Graupe. His grandfather Salomon Carlebach (1845–1919), who married Esther Carlebach née Adler (1853–1920), was already a rabbi in Lübeck. His uncle Joseph Carlebach was a rabbi in Hamburg. Carlebach's younger brother Ephraim was a rabbi in Montreal (Canada). He had another brother, Salomon, and a sister, Esther.

Carlebach was a student at Katharineum zu Lübeck. After he passed his A-levels in 1929 he studied theology and music in Köln. In 1934 he became a teacher at Höhere Israelitische Schule in Leipzig a school for Jewish students founded by his uncle Ephraim Carlebach (1879–1936) in 1912. His uncle emigrated to Palestine in spring 1936 and died there in October 1936. In 1936 Felix he married Babette Kohn (d. 1991) who was then teaching at Höhere Israelitische Schule. The couple had three daughters, Judith, Sulamith and Naomi.

Felix Carlebach's parents, together with his uncle Joseph Carlebach (1883–1942) and his wife Charlotte née Preuss (b. 1900), were deported with their four youngest children to Jungfernhof concentration camp, near Riga on December 6, 1942. His father Simson Carlebach died just after the arrival. His mother, his uncle and aunt and their three daughters Ruth (b. 1926), Noemi (b. 1927) und Sara (b. 1928) were executed in Bikernieki forest near Riga on March 26, 1942.(???year incorrect???) Only Carlebach's cousin Salomon Carlebach (b. August 17, 1925) survived, and later became a rabbi in New York City.

Felix Carlebach and his wife Babette escaped to Great Britain with the support of British Chief Rabbi Joseph H. Hertz in 1939. Carlebach said: It was one of the luckiest events of my life that my wife and I survived. He became a rabbi because of a need he said. World War II began and all rabbis had to join the army and overnight there were jobs. I was simply put in.

In London he worked as a rabbi at the Palmers Green and Southgate United Synagogue from 1939 to 1947, replacing a rabbi who had joined the army. From 1947 until he retired in 1984 he worked as a rabbi at the South Manchester Synagogue. In 1954 he passed the Master of Arts examination at Victoria University of Manchester.

In 1985 Carlebach went back to Lübeck for the first time since 1939 after Albrecht Schreiber, editor of Lübecker Nachrichten who published about the history of Jews in Lübeck, came to see Carlebach in Manchester, having been sent by Lübeck's mayor Robert Knüppel. Carlebach described Knüppel's intention: See him in Manchester, find out if he is willing to reach out his hands, if he is willing to pass a bridge I would like to build. Carlebach described his reaction and the consequences: Brotherhood after the cruelties of the past. It was a very difficult matter (...) I did it and got excellent relationships to the authorities of Lübeck by the mayor and our former school.

During his stay in Lübeck he visited Katharineum, his former school, and met twelve of his former classmates whom he had not seen since 1939. We hugged each other and said: "Such may never happen again."

In 1987 the city of Lübeck offered honorary citizenship to Carlebach, which he received on September 17, 1987 in the town hall of Lübeck. Carlebach became the 19th honorary citizen of the city.

At the time of Carlebach's 90th birthday a Lübeck delegation went to see him in Manchester. Carlebach told Robert Knüppel and other members of the delegation that Lübeck was in his thoughts and memories often, although he was no longer able to go to his father's city because of his old age.

The South Manchester Synagogue honoured Carlebach with a plaque at the entrance of its new building, which was unveiled by the Prince Charles, Prince of Wales, in April 2003. He also planted a tree in Carlebach's honour.

The Hallé Orchestra of Manchester honoured Carlebach year by year by giving a symphony concert for which he choose the programme.

The City of Lübeck honoured all members of the Carlebach rabbinical family by naming a new park in Hochschulstadtteil near the university Carlebach Park.

== Sources ==
- Presse- und Informationsamt der Hansestadt Lübeck (Hrsg): Festakt aus Anlass der Verleihung der Ehrenbürgerschaft der Hansestadt Lübeck an Rabbiner Felix F. Carlebach am 17. September 1987 im Bürgerschaftssaal des Lübecker Rathauses. Hansestadt Lübeck, Bürgerschaft und Senat, Lübeck 1987
- Sabine Niemann (Ed.): Die Carlebachs, eine Rabbinerfamilie aus Deutschland, Ephraim-Carlebach-Stiftung (Hrsg). Dölling und Galitz. Hamburg 1995, ISBN 3-926174-99-4
