= Carlebach movement =

Orthodox Jewish movement inspired by the legacy of Rabbi Shlomo Carlebach

The Carlebach movement is an Orthodox Jewish movement inspired by the legacy of Rabbi Shlomo Carlebach. The Carlebach movement has promoted a form of Jewish worship, colloquially known as "nusach Carlebach" (Carlebach liturgy). One of the centers of the movement is Mevo Modi'im (the "Carlebach moshav") in Israel.

== Origins ==
The movement originates with the founding of The House of Love and Prayer, by Rabbi Carlebach, inspired by the counterculture of the 1960s. Rabbi Carlebach called his followers "holy hippielech" ("holy hippies"). Many of Carlebach's followers soon began practicing Judaism according to the Orthodox tradition.

== Founding ==
Carlebach founded a Moshav settlement in Mevo Modi'im, Israel. A number of his followers continue to live there today. The Moshav is commonly referred to as the "Carlebach Moshav".

== After Carlebach's death ==
Following Rabbi Carlebach's death, his followers organized a number of commemorative events, paying tribute to their deceased leader. These events included both traditional Jewish mourning events (i.e., the Shiva, Shloshim and Yahrtzeit), as well as concerts and Friday night services incorporating songs composed by Rabbi Carlebach.

Carlebach's legacy also inspired the creation of a musical presented by the National Yiddish Theatre titled "The House of Love and Prayer". Carlebach's daughter, Neshama Carlebach was among the production's collaborators. And a Broadway musical, titled Soul Doctor: Journey of a Rockstar Rabbi, recently ran in New Orleans, Miami, and New York City.

== The movement today ==
The Carlebach movement does not have a centralized leadership, and no legal entity represents the movement at large. Also, the movement is not homogeneous; while Carlebach's initial following consisted mostly of former non-Orthodox Jews, today, his followers originate from various Orthodox communities, including ultra-Orthodox ones. Carlebach followers are located around the world, usually near existing Orthodox communities.

=== Carlebach synagogues ===
Since Carlebach's death, a number of Orthodox synagogues have adapted their liturgical style to incorporate Carlebach tunes and customs. In some cases, synagogues are formed exclusively for this purpose, and have attracted Jews from non-Carlebach communities. There are believed to be over 100 Carlebach synagogues around the world.

== See also ==
- Carlebach minyan
- Nusach
