= Elisheva Carlebach Jofen =

American scholar

- Born: Elisheva Carlebach
- Title: Salo Wittmayer Baron Professor of Jewish History, Culture and Society

Academic background
- Education: Brooklyn College, Columbia University

Elisheva Carlebach Jofen is an American scholar of early modern Jewish history.

== Career ==
Carlebach obtained her bachelor's degree from Brooklyn College. In 1986 she completed her PhD in Jewish History at Columbia University. Subsequently, she was a professor of Jewish History at Queens College and the Graduate Center, CUNY, in New York City. Since 2008 she has been the Salo Wittmayer Baron Professor of Jewish history, culture and society at Columbia University.

Carlebach is married to Rabbi Mordechai Jofen, the rosh yeshiva ("dean") of the Novardok yeshiva Beis Yosef in Brooklyn, New York City. She uses her maiden name professionally and her married name in her personal life.

Carlebach's family was one of the preeminent rabbinical families in Germany before the Holocaust. Her grandfather was Rabbi Joseph Carlebach, the last chief rabbi of Hamburg, and her father is Rabbi Shlomo Carlebach who served as the mashgiach ruchani at the Yeshiva Rabbi Chaim Berlin and author of the commentary on the Humash Maskil Lishlomo.

== Publications ==
=== Books ===
- Palaces of Time: Jewish Calendar and Culture in Early Modern Europe, (Belknap Press, 2011) ISBN-10: 0674052544
- The Pursuit of Heresy :Rabbi Moses Hagiz and the Sabbatian Controversies, (Columbia University Press, 1990; 1994) ISBN 0-231-07191-4
- Divided Souls: Converts from Judaism in Germany, 1500-1750 Yale University Press, 2001 ISBN 0-300-08410-2. Finalist for the 2001-02 National Jewish Book Award
- Co-editor, History and Memory: Jewish Perspectives, Brandeis/University Press of New England, 1998.

=== Articles ===
- "Redemption and Persecution in the Eyes of R. Moses Hayim Luzzatto and his Circle", Proceedings of the American Academy for Jewish Research, 54 (1987), 1-29.
- "Converts and their Narratives in Early Modern Germany", Leo Baeck Institute Yearbook, 1995
- "Rabbinic Circles on Messianic Pathways in the Post- Expulsion Era", Judaism: A Quarterly Journal, Special Symposium issue on the impact of the Spanish Expulsion, 41 (1992), pp. 208–216.
- "Two Amens that Delayed the Redemption: Jewish Messianism and Popular Spirituality in the Post-Sabbatian Century", Jewish Quarterly Review, 82 (1992): 241-261.
- "Sabbatianism and the Jewish-Christian Polemic", Proceedings of the Tenth World Congress of Jewish Studies, Division C, Vol. II: Jewish Thought and Literature (Jerusalem, 1990): 1-7.

=== Theses ===
- Russell, John Quinn-Isidore; Carlebach, Elisheva; Nguyen, Lien-Hang. Abandoning the Crown: U.S.-Vatican Relations During the Vietnam War, 1963-1968 (PDF). Department of History, Columbia University. p. 80. Archived (PDF) from the original on July 18, 2020.

== Awards ==
- 1991: National Jewish Book Award in the Jewish History category for The Pursuit of Heresy :Rabbi Moses Hagiz and the Sabbatian Controversies

== See also ==
- Carlebach (disambiguation)
