= Hadassah Carlebach =

Russian-American Holocaust survivor (1928–2026)

- Born: Hadassah Miriam Schneersohn; 23 February 1928; Leningrad, Russian SFSR, Soviet Union
- Died: 6 September 2026 (aged 98); New York City, U.S.
- Occupation: Memoirist

Hadassah Miriam Carlebach (née Schneersohn; 23 February 1928 – 6 September 2026) was a Russian-American Holocaust survivor and memoirist.

== Biography ==
Born in Leningrad on 23 February 1928, Carlebach was the daughter of rabbi Schneour Zalman Schneersohn and Sarah Levine. Her brother was Sholom DovBer Schneersohn, who also became a rabbi. During World War II, she accompanied her family in going to France, where she worked alongside her father for the Œuvre de secours aux enfants and rescued many children from the Nazi occupation. After the war, she moved to New York City and married rabbi Eli Chaim Carlebach. Following the death of Shlomo Carlebach, Eli's twin brother, the couple took over his work in Manhattan.

Carlebach died in New York City on 6 September 2026, at the age of 98.

== Bibliography ==
- Lucien Lazare, La Résistance juive en France, Stock, Paris, 1987, (ISBN 2-234-02080-8).
- Judith Friedlander, Vilna On The Seine, Jewish Intellectuals In France Since 1968, Yale University Press, New Haven & Londres, 1990, (ISBN 0-300-04703-7).
- Ari L. Goldman, The Search for God at Harvard. Ballantine Books, 1992. (ISBN 0345377060, ISBN 9780345377067)
- Joan Nathan, Bread of Freedom in Times of Despair, The New York Times, 16 avril 2008 (Section Dining & Wine).
- Natan Ophir, Rabbi Shlomo Carlebach : Life, Mission, and Legacy, Jerusalem New York, Urim Publications, 2014, 503 p. (ISBN 978-965-524-143-3)
- Chaim Dalfin, Faces & Places Boro Park. Jewish Enrichment Press, Brooklyn, New York, 2017 (ISBN 9780997909906)
- Molly Resnick. Daughter Of A Schneerson, Wife Of A Carlebach. An Interview with Mrs. Hadassa Carlebach. The Jewish Press, New York, Friday, September 21, 2018, p. 12.
