= Bornplatz Synagogue =

Former synagogue in Hamburg

- Bornplatzsynagoge
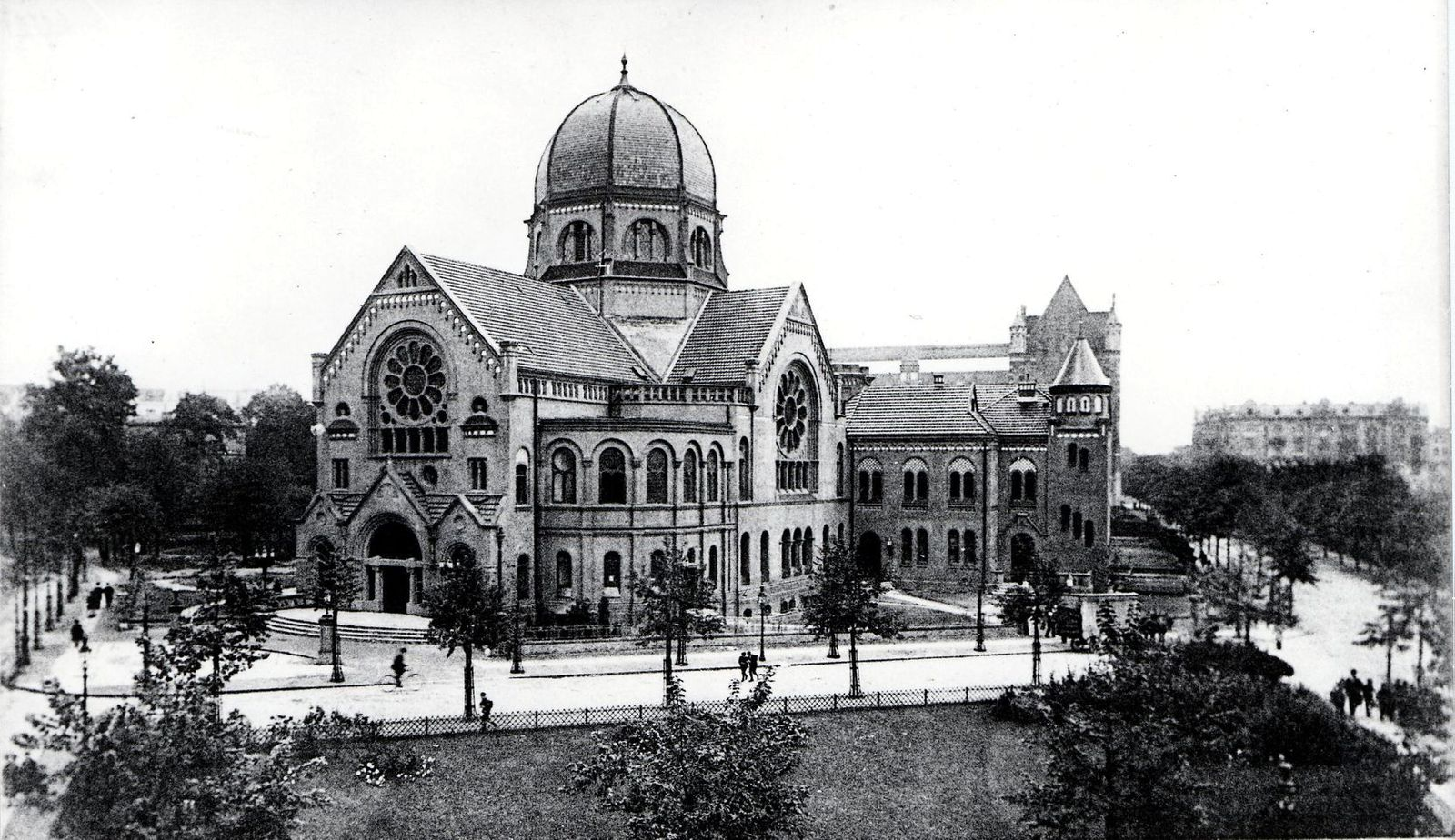
- Synagogue in 1906

Religion
- Affiliation: Judaism
- Sect: Conservative
- Year consecrated: 1906

Location
- Municipality: Hamburg
- Country: German Empire (later Nazi Germany)
- Interactive map of Bornplatz Synagogue
- Coordinates: 53.56803°N 9.98322°E

Architecture
- Architect: Semmy Engel
- Destroyed: November 9, 1938

The Bornplatz Synagogue (German: Bornplatzsynagoge) was a synagogue located in the Grindel district of Hamburg. It was inaugurated in 1906 and was one of the largest synagogues in Germany. It served as the main synagogue of the German-Israelite Community (German: Deutsch-Israelitischen Gemeinde (DIG)).

During Kristallnacht, on November 9, 1938, the synagogue was destroyed. It was set on fire shortly afterwards and the ruins were demolished later that year by the local Nazi authorities. 50 years following its destruction, the former site was redesigned, and has since had a floor mosaic point towards the location of its former site. Since 2019, the Jewish community in the area, the Central Council of Jews in Germany, and several other organizations have advocated for the synagogue's reconstruction. In February 2020, an application for a feasibility study was approved unanimously by the Hamburg Parliament. In November 2020, the Budget Committee of the Bundestag released 65 million euros for the restoration of the synagogue.

== Background ==
Until the 19th century, the center of Jewish life in the city was primarily in the Neustadt neighborhood. The congregation for the city maintained two synagogues there. One in Elbstraße and one on Kohlhöfen Street. After the Hamburger Torsperre was lifted in 1861, more Jews moved to newer residential neighborhoods, including Grindel. Many Jewish organizations moved along with them.

In the immediate vicinity of Bornplatz was the New Dammtor Synagogue in Beneckestraße. It was built in 1895 in a Moorish Revival style, and had a capacity of around 500 people. Celebrations followed the Conservative tradition. The synagogue's owner, the 'Verein der Neuen Dammtor-Synagoge' (Association of the New Dammtor Synagogue), was founded in 1892 and was one of three religious association of the German-Israelite Community referred to as the Hamburg System. The other two religious associations were the Reform Jewish 'Israelitische Tempelverband' (Israelite Temple Association) and the Orthodox Jewish 'Deutsch-Israelitische Synagogenverband' (German-Israelite Synagogue Association). From its inception in 1906, the Bornplatz synagogue was the main synagogue of the Conservative movement in Hamburg.

== History ==
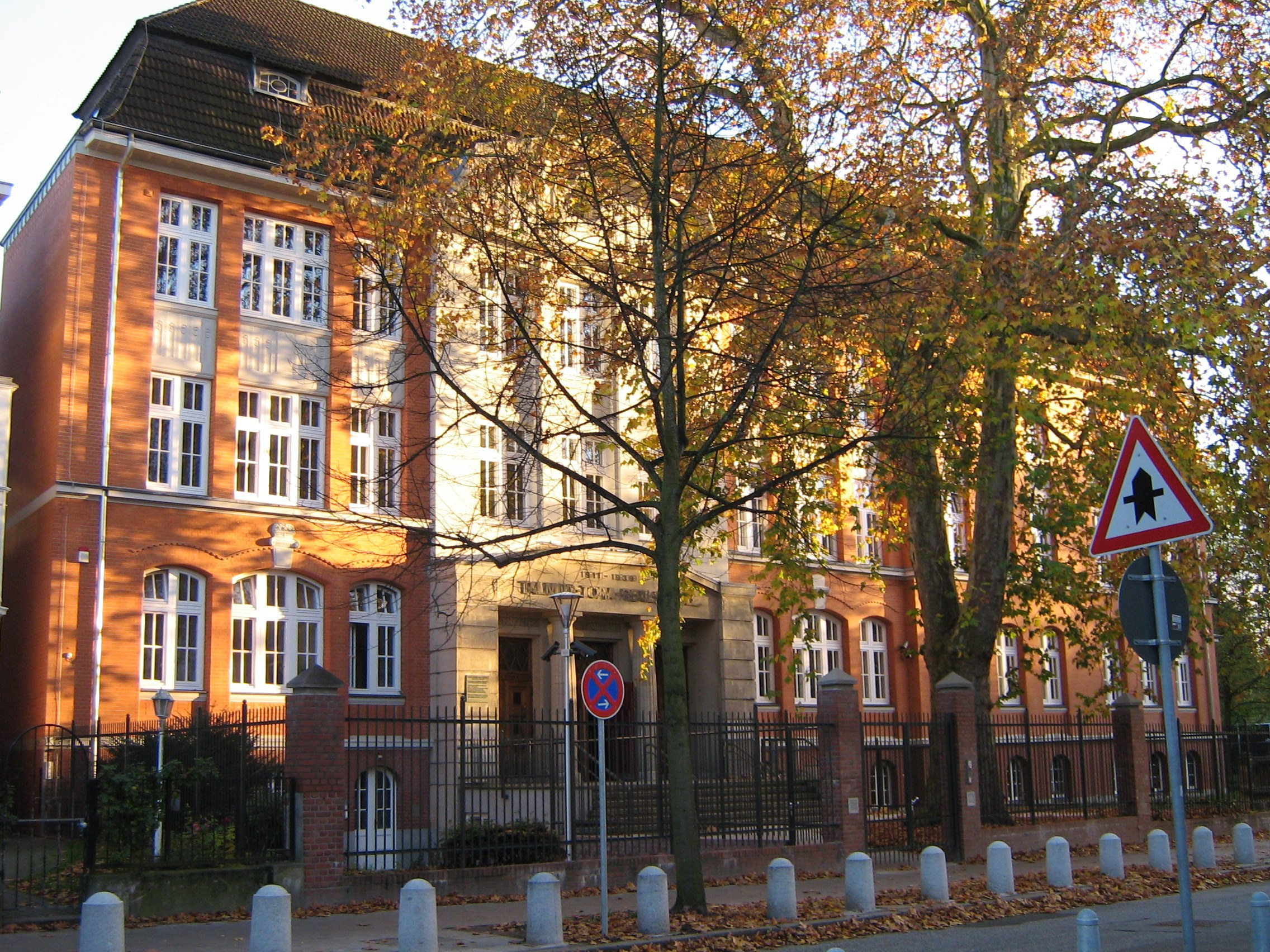
The Talmud-Torah in modern-day

In 1906, the building was officially consecrated. In 1911, the Talmud Torah was established in a new building at Grindelhof, north of the Synagogue boundaries. The styles of the synagogue and school were different, although they matched in color. From 1921 onwards, Rabbi Joseph Carlebach was the rector of the synagogue's school.

In the 1930s, there were many anti-Semitic incidents in the Grindel district. Journalist Esriel Carlebach, nephew of the Rabbi, was attacked because he had written critically about the treatment of Jews in the Soviet Union in his series of articles on Soviet Jewry. A group led by the Young Communist League of Germany sent an assassin who fired several shots at him on January 4, 1933. A shot through his hat narrowly missed his head. Visitors to Jewish events were attacked and harassed and graves in the Jewish cemetery were damaged. The congregation discreetly requested protection from the police, especially on high holidays, and worshippers were asked through memos not to gather outside of the synagogue.

In 1936, the synagogue was lit up for the celebration of Rabbi Carlebach's inauguration as Chief Rabbi of the DIG. The event was attended by more than 2,000 people, including 200 guests of honor. During Kristallnacht, the synagogue was desecrated and its interior was destroyed. Two days later, a fire was set on the inside of the building. One eyewitness reported the vandalization of Torah scrolls. The concrete building, however, survived the attack.

In 1939, the German Senate demanded the resale of the building back from the community, citing a clause from the 1902 deed that stated that the property must be vacated if it was no longer needed for the synagogue. According to the clause, however, the cost for the demolition of the building had to be covered by the municipality. On March 30, 1939, the city applied for the demolition of the concrete structure. On May 2, 1939, the municipality sold the property back to the city government for a nominal fee. On July 14, 1939, the NSDAP daily paper Hamburger Tageblatt reported on the demolition of the synagogue, stating: "Where a few sad ruins still stand today, a friendly green square will soon bring joy to all." By the middle of 1940, all remains had been demolished and removed. On August 15, 1940, the sale of the property went to effect and the square was transferred back to the city. Later, a high-rise bunker was built on the property, which still exists as of 2024.

In lieu of their building, the congregation integrated into the New Dammtor Synagogue, which was restored with private funds after Kristallnacht. It was completely destroyed by bombing in 1943. Carlebach, along with many residents of Hamburg, were deported and murdered in 1942.

== Construction ==
In 1902, the plot of land for construction was purchased by the community for 90,459 Marks. Its construction began un 1904, and its capacity was set to hold 1,200 people. It was designed by architect Semmy Engel and master builder Ernst Friedheim. The two plans were initially submitted separately by them, and then were merged into one plan for collaboration. On September 13, 1906, the new building was opened as a synagogue, and the then-Chief Rabbi Markus Hirsch gave a commemorative sermon.

The synagogue was built in the Neo-Romanesque style and was topped by a dome covered with glazed bricks. It was built on top of a frame nearly 40 meters tall. The windows were round and stained glass. The main entrance towards the west faced towards the Grindelberg and was accessible via a terrace. Behind the main buildings were adjunct buildings for day-to-day activities, a mikveh, and administrative offices.

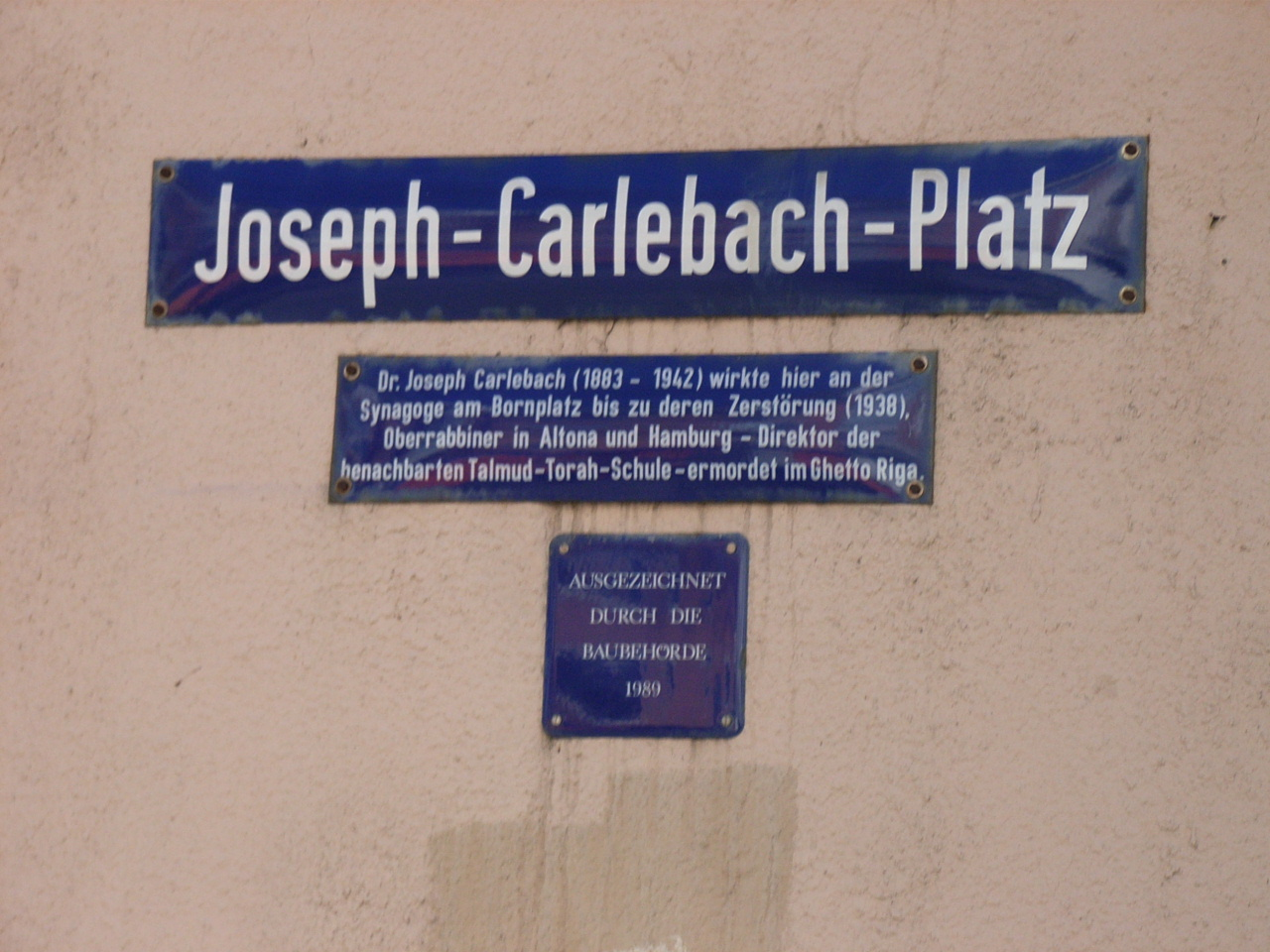
Plaque commemorating Joseph Carlebach in the "platz"

=== Memorial and post-demolition ===
In the beginning, only a memorial plaque remained on the bunker to commemorate the synagogue, and the site of the synagogue also served as a parking lot for a nearby university. The surviving building of the Talmud-Torah was municipally owned and was used as a building for the Hamburg University of Applied Sciences. The eastern part of the square had been named Joseph-Carlebach-Platz after the former Rabbi in 1989. In 2004, at citizen's initiative, another plaque was installed, this time providing information about the history of the synagogue.

In 2004, the Talmud Torah was returned to the Jewish community, and has since undergone a renovation that allowed for a Jewish elementary school and community center to move in to the building.

== Calls for reconstruction ==
In November 2019, a public debate arose in Hamburg over the potential reconstruction of the synagogue due to an interview by the daily newspaper Hamburger Abendblatt with local rabbi Shlomo Bistritzky. The proposal to rebuild the synagogue showed popular with many people in the community. Hamburger's mayor Peter Tschentscher and Chancellor Olaf Scholz both showed support for the project to reconstruct the synagogue. The Hamburg society 'Vom Holocaust zum neuen Leben' (From Holocaust to New Life), an association of 17 Holocaust survivors, also released statements showing support for the plans. Additionally, local Christian and Muslim community members supported the initiative. In a signature petition, 107,000 people signed their support for the plan.

During a meeting in November 2020, the Budget Committee of the Bundestag provided 600,000 euros for the financing of a feasibility study for the project after a February 2020 meeting by the Hamburg parliament that showed unanimous support for the reconstruction. Later in November, the Bundestag allocated 65,000,000 euros for the project, matching the pledge of the city of Hamburg.

== Sources ==
- Hamburg Universität (1991). Die Juden in Hamburg 1590 bis 1990: wissenschaftliche Beiträge der Universität Hamburg zur Ausstellung "Vierhundert Jahre Juden in Hamburg" (in German). Dölling und Galitz. ISBN 978-3-926174-25-3.
