= Arnold Paucker =

- Born: 6 January 1921
- Died: October 13, 2016 (aged 95)
- Occupation: Historian

Arnold Paucker, OBE (Berlin, January 6, 1921 - London, October 13, 2016) was a Jewish German-English historian. He was the long-time editor of the Leo Baeck Institute Year Book, published by the Leo Baeck Institute London.

The primary subjects of his work were Jewish self-defense in Wilhelmine and Weimar Germany as well as Jewish resistance against the national socialist regime after 1933. An important theme of his was the rebuttal of the stereotype of "Jewish passivity." A particular research interest was the Central Association of German Citizens of Jewish Faith.

== Selected works ==
Monographs

- Der jüdische Abwehrkampf gegen Antisemitismus und Nationalsozialismus in den letzten Jahren der Weimarer Republik (= Hamburger Beiträge zur Zeitgeschichte. 4, ISSN 0440-1689). Leibniz, Hamburg 1968.
- Standhalten und Widerstehen. Der Widerstand deutscher und österreichischer Juden gegen die nationalsozialistische Diktatur (= Stuttgarter Vorträge zur Zeitgeschichte. 4). Klartext, Essen 1995, ISBN 3-88474-381-3.
- Deutsche Juden im Widerstand 1933–1945. Tatsachen und Probleme. Gedenkstätte Deutscher Widerstand, Berlin 1999, (2nd expanded edition, 2003, ISBN 3-926082-14-3; (PDF; 596 KB)).
- Deutsche Juden im Kampf um Recht und Freiheit. Studien zur Abwehr, Selbstbehauptung und Widerstand der deutschen Juden seit dem Ende des 19. Jahrhunderts. Hentrich & Hentrich, Teetz 2003, ISBN 3-933471-46-X (2nd improved edition 2004, ISBN 3-933471-89-3).

Edited Volumes

- with Werner E. Mosse: Entscheidungsjahr 1932. Zur Judenfrage in der Endphase der Weimarer Republik. Ein Sammelband (= Schriftenreihe wissenschaftlicher Abhandlungen des Leo-Baeck-Instituts. 13, ISSN 0459-097X). Mohr, Tübingen 1965.
- with Werner E. Mosse: Deutsches Judentum in Krieg und Revolution. 1916–1923. Ein Sammelband (= Schriftenreihe wissenschaftlicher Abhandlungen des Leo-Baeck-Instituts. 25). Mohr, Tübingen 1971, ISBN 3-16-831401-3.
- with Hans Liebeschütz: Das Judentum in der deutschen Umwelt. 1800–1850. Studien zur Frühgeschichte der Emanzipation (= Schriftenreihe wissenschaftlicher Abhandlungen des Leo-Baeck-Instituts. 35). Mohr, Tübingen 1977, ISBN 3-16-839412-2.
- with Werner E. Mosse: Revolution and Evolution 1848 in German-Jewish history. (Robert Weltsch on his 90. Birthday in Grateful Appreciation) (= Schriftenreihe wissenschaftlicher Abhandlungen des Leo-Baeck-Instituts. 39). Mohr, Tübingen 1981, ISBN 3-16-743752-9.
- Enlightenment and Acculturation. Persecution under the Nazi Regime (= Leo Baeck Institute. Year Book. 29, ISSN 0075-8744). East and West Library, London, 1984.
- From Weimar to Hitler. Demography and Sociology (= Leo Baeck Institute. Year Book. 30). East and West Library, London, 1985.
- with Sylvia Gilchrist und Barbara Suchy: Die Juden im nationalsozialistischen Deutschland. 1933–1945. = The Jews in Nazi Germany (= Schriftenreihe wissenschaftlicher Abhandlungen des Leo-Baeck-Instituts. 45). Mohr, Tübingen 1986, ISBN 3-16-745103-3.
- Nineteenth-Century Antisemitism and Nazi Rule (= Leo Baeck Institute. Year Book. 32). East and West Library, London, 1987.
- Emancipation and Defence (= Leo Baeck Institute. Year Book. 33). East and West Library, London, 1988.
- German Jewry. Integration – Self-Questioning – Catastrophe. Post-War Historiography (= Leo Baeck Institute. Year Book. 35). East and West Library, London, 1990.
- with Werner E. Mosse, Julius Carlebach, Gerhard Hirschfeld, Aubrey Newman, Peter Pulzer: Second Chance: Two Centuries Of German-speaking Jews in the United Kingdom. J.C.B. Mohr, London, 1991.
- A Community assailed (= Leo Baeck Institute. Year Book. 36). East and West Library, London, 1991.
- with Ludger Heid: Juden und deutsche Arbeiterbewegung bis 1933. Soziale Utopien und religiös-kulturelle Traditionen (= Schriftenreihe wissenschaftlicher Abhandlungen des Leo-Baeck-Instituts. 49). Mohr, Tübingen 1992, ISBN 3-16-146016-2.
- Enlightenment and Emancipation Antisemitism, War and Resistance (= Leo Baeck Institute. Year Book. 37). East and West Library, London, 1992.
- with Hans Erler und Ernst Ludwig Ehrlich: „Gegen alle Vergeblichkeit“. Jüdischer Widerstand gegen den Nationalsozialismus. Campus, Frankfurt am Main, 2003, ISBN 3-593-37362-9.
