= Hartwig Naftali Carlebach =

German rabbi

Rabbi Hartwig Naftali Carlebach
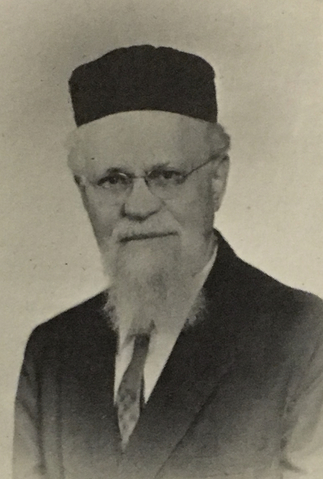
- Title: Rabbi

Personal life
- Born: Hartwig Naftali Carlebach
- Spouse: Paula (Pesse) Cohn
- Children: Rabbi Shlomo Carlebach; Rabbi Eli Chaim Carlebach; Shulamith Levovitz
- Parent(s): Rabbi Dr. Solomon Carlebach; Esther Adler

Religious life
- Religion: Judaism
- Synagogue: Congregation Kehilath Jacob "The Carlebach Shul"
- Position: Founding Rabbi

Hartwig Naftali Carlebach (1889–1967) was a German rabbi.

== Biography ==
Hartwig Naftali Carlebach was born in 1889, the eleventh of 12 children of Esther Adler (1853–1920), the daughter of the former rabbi of Lübeck, Alexander Sussmann Adler (1816–1869), and Lübeck's then rabbi Salomon (Shlomo) Carlebach (1845–1919). Four of his brothers were rabbis as well. They are Emanuel Carlebach (1874–1927), Joseph Carlebach (1883–1942), David Carlebach (1885–1913) and Ephraim Carlebach (1879–1936).

The Carlebach family is a notable Jewish family originally from Germany that now lives all over the world.

He was the rabbi of the Passauerstrasse Synagogue of Berlin from 1917 to 1931. From 1931 to 1938 Naphtali Carlebach was Chief Rabbi of Baden near Vienna, Austria.

In 1950 Carlebach assumed the spiritual leadership of Congregation Kehilath Jacob, "The Carlebach Shul," located on the Upper West Side of Manhattan. After his death in 1967, his sons Shlomo Carlebach and Eli Chaim Carlebach took over his position.
