= Julius Carlebach =

German-British rabbi

Julius Carlebach (28 December 1922 in Hamburg, died 16 April 2001 in Brighton, UK) was a German-British rabbi and professor of sociology and history.

== Biography ==
He was a son of the Hamburg and Altona chief rabbi Joseph Carlebach (1883–1942) and his wife Charlotte (née Preuss; 1900–1942), and a grandson of Rabbi Salomon Carlebach (1845–1919) and his wife Esther Carlebach, part of the Carlebach family of prominent German Jews.

Much of his family was imprisoned in the Jungfernhof concentration camp in Latvia. Julius and a sister escaped the concentration camps, being taken in by British foster families via the Kindertransport.

Carlebach went to school in London, and was a sailor in the Royal Navy for ten years and managed an orphanage for Jewish children in Norwood. At the orphanage, he met South African teacher Myrna Landau, whom he married. In 1959 he went to Kenya, where he worked until 1963 in Nairobi and also served as rabbi and wrote about the Jewish community in that nation. In Kenya, the couple's two sons were born, Joseph Zvi Carlebach and Ezriel Carlebach.

From 1964 he was a research student at the University of Cambridge and then taught at the University of Bristol. In 1968 he took over the job of associate professor of Sociology and Israel Studies at the University of Sussex in Brighton. There he also headed the Department of Sociology. In 1989 he worked at the College of Jewish Studies in Heidelberg; he was its rector until 1997.

Carlebach was a board member of the Leo Baeck Institute in 1992.

== Honors ==
In 1994, Carlebach received the Order of Merit of the Federal Republic of Germany.

== Selected works ==
Books

- The Jews of Nairobi. Nairobi 1962
- Caring for Children in Trouble. London 1970.
- Judaism in the German environment. Tübingen 1977.
- Karl Marx and the Radical Critique of Judaism. London, Routledge and Kegan Paul, 1978, ISBN 0-7100-8279-7.
- Second Chance: Two Centuries Of German-speaking Jews in the United Kingdom edited by Werner E. Mosse, Julius Carlebach, Gerhard Hirschfeld, Aubrey Newman, Arnold Paucker, Peter Pulzer, J.C.B. Mohr, London, 1991.
- Problems of the Jewish University life. London 1981.
- Orthodox Jewry in Germany - the Final Stages of Tübingen 1986.
- On the history of the Jewish woman in Germany. (Ed.), Berlin 1993.

Articles or Essays

- "Juvenile prostitutes in Nairobi". East Africa Studies, Vol 16 (1962)
- "Family relationships of deprived and non-deprived Kikuyu children from polygamous marriages." Journal of Tropical Pediatrics (1967) Vol. 13, no. 4, pp. 185–200.
- "The Forgotten Connection: Women and Jews in the Conflict between Enlightenment and Romanticism". Leo Baeck Institute Yearbook (1979) Vol. 24, no. 1, pp 107–138
