= Tanchum Portnoy =

American composer of the melody "Eitz Chaim" (1951–2026)

- Born: Tanchum Gershon Portnoy; July 22, 1951; Brooklyn, New York, U.S.
- Died: September 12, 2026 (aged 75)
- Resting place: Eretz HaChaim Cemetery, Beit Shemesh, Israel
- Education: Queens College (MA)
- Occupations: Composer, author
- Years active: 1975–2026
- Known for: Melody for "Eitz Chaim"
- Notable work: Tanchumim (1975); Or Eliezer (2025)
- Spouse: Sara Portnoy
- Children: 4
- Relatives: Rabbi Eliezer Portnoy (father)

Tanchum Gershon Portnoy (July 22, 1951 – September 12, 2026) was an American composer of Jewish music, best known for writing the melody to "Eitz Chaim" ("Tree of Life"), a setting of the liturgical text Eitz Chaim Hi (Proverbs 3:18, 3:17) and Hashivenu (Lamentations 5:21) sung as the Torah is returned to the ark. First released on his 1975 album Tanchumim, the melody spread through synagogues across denominations worldwide and came to be widely assumed to be a traditional tune of unknown origin.

Following his death on Rosh Hashanah 2026, his family organized a worldwide tribute in which synagogues on several continents sang the melody in his memory on Shabbat Shuvah, September 19, 2026, and identified him as its composer.

== Early life and family ==
Portnoy was born on July 22, 1951, in Brooklyn, New York, into a family with a long rabbinical tradition. His father, Rabbi Eliezer Portnoy (died 1975), had arrived at the Mir Yeshiva in Europe as a fourteen-year-old orphan and played a significant role in the yeshiva's escape from Lithuania during the Holocaust, working to secure passports, visas, and funds for its students. He dealt directly with the Japanese diplomat Chiune Sugihara, whose transit visas were central to the rescue, and was among the first of the group to leave Lithuania, reaching Kobe, Japan, in January 1941; the remaining students followed via the Trans-Siberian Railway and Vladivostok. Rabbi Chaim Shmuelevitz, who fled with the yeshiva and later headed it, credited Rabbi Eliezer with making the escape possible. After the war Rabbi Eliezer taught at Mercaz HaTorah in Montreal, served as principal of Yeshiva Rabbi Chaim Berlin, and was a rabbi in Brooklyn. He died in 1975 at the age of 57.

Portnoy spent most of his early life in yeshiva study, at Yeshiva Chofetz Chaim and at the Mir Yeshiva, where he received rabbinic ordination (semikhah) from Rabbi Chaim Shmuelevitz. He later earned a master's degree in psychology from Queens College. At the time of his first album he was helping to administer a rabbinical organization on Long Island while pursuing those graduate studies. He was a longtime resident of Lawrence, New York, in the Five Towns.

== Career ==
=== "Eitz Chaim" ===
External audio
- "Eitz Chaim" – original 1975 recording from Tanchumim, sung by Avraham Yanon, arranged by Yisroel Lamm

Portnoy composed the melody for "Eitz Chaim" in the early 1970s, at the age of 22. He released it in February 1975 on his album Tanchumim (Hebrew for "consolations," a play on his own name), on which he is credited as composer, producer, and director, with Yisroel Lamm arranging and conducting. The song was sung on the album by Rabbi Alvin Wainhaus, who performed under the name Avraham Yanon. The ten-track LP (catalogue number TG 201), released on Portnoy's own label, is preserved in the Judaic collection of the Recorded Sound Archives at Florida Atlantic University and in the music collection of the National Library of Israel; its credited performers also include Shlomo Carlebach, who appeared as a guest soloist on two other Portnoy compositions on the record, along with Bency Schachter and Avigdor Bernstein. A second volume of Tanchumim followed in 2001.

The composition sets the verses from Proverbs and continues into the Hashivenu verse from Lamentations that concludes the Torah service. Writing in Tablet, Menachem Butler attributed the melody's spread to features that made it well suited to congregational singing: a compact range, short phrases, and repetition that made it easy to remember and to lead without accompaniment or written music. Matzav.com similarly observed that one voice could begin the tune and an entire congregation could immediately follow.

The tune was popularized by leading cantors and by Portnoy's friend, the singer and composer Shlomo Carlebach. It became one of the most widely sung settings of the text across Orthodox, Conservative, and Reform communities. Rabbi Daniel Kraus, writing in the Jewish Journal, recounted growing up singing it in Melbourne and later hearing it in Honolulu and Riga, and described it as a melody that had crossed denominational and geographic boundaries without any central coordination.

As it passed between congregations, local variants developed, and the melody was increasingly received as an anonymous traditional tune; the Jewish music publisher Velvel Pasternak once encountered liner notes labeling it "traditional" and corrected the attribution. Cantor Arik Wollheim of Beth Jacob Congregation in Beverly Hills, who led the melody with Portnoy standing beside him on several occasions, has written that the version most synagogues sing differs from the 1975 recording in several small ways, most audibly on the word me'ushar ("happy"): in the original the opening syllable moves through several notes and the phrase rises before resolving, whereas in the common version the syllable is held on a single pitch and the phrase descends to its final note. When Wollheim apologized for the congregation's altered version, Portnoy replied with the rabbinic dictum minhag Yisrael Torah hu ("the custom of Israel is Torah"), indicating he was content to let the melody become the community's own. Butler compared this trajectory to that of Ben Zion Shenker's 1953 setting of "Eshet Chayil," another twentieth-century composition that came to be sung as if inherited. Portnoy said that wherever he traveled he would hear his melody sung in synagogues; on one occasion, hearing a congregation sing it exactly as he had written it, he chose to join in rather than identify himself as its composer. The singer Yaakov Shwekey recalled Portnoy introducing himself at a wedding by saying his name was "Eitz Chaim," because that was how people knew him.

=== Recordings and arrangements ===
The melody has been recorded and arranged by numerous artists and ensembles, including:

- Uncle Moishy, on Uncle Moishy Volume 5
- Blue Fringe, on the album The Whole World Lit Up
- A choral arrangement (solo voice, SATB choir, and piano) by Aryell Cohen, edited by Aryell Cohen and Joshua Breitzer, published by Transcontinental Music Publications
- A lead-sheet version included in the Union for Reform Judaism's 2005 Biennial Songbook
- An arrangement by Noah Aronson, published by Hal Leonard
- A recording by Cantor Marcus Feldman with choir, directed by Aryell Cohen
- "Etz Chaim" (2021), a single by the British-Israeli duo The Portnoy Brothers featuring their father, Rabbi Joel Portnoy
- A 2021 single by the Darchei Noam school choir of Beit Shemesh, based on Portnoy's melody with additional passages composed by Chana Wurtzel, arranged by Jeff Horvitch
- Following his death, recordings by Yaakov Shwekey and by the Israeli conductor and cantor Eli Jaffe, a relative and friend of Portnoy, who recorded the melody as originally written rather than in the form commonly sung in synagogues

=== Or Eliezer ===
In the summer of 2025, fifty years after his father's death, Portnoy and his wife Sara published Or Eliezer, a Hebrew-language sefer produced in Lakewood, New Jersey. The volume collected Rabbi Eliezer Portnoy's Torah writings and eulogies alongside a reconstruction of his life and of the Mir Yeshiva's wartime escape, drawing on family recollections, photographs, and period documents. It included an English-language essay by Portnoy, "A Son Reflects," recounting his father's arrival at Mir as a fourteen-year-old orphan and his later efforts on behalf of the yeshiva's students. Several obituaries noted a symmetry between father and son: Portnoy spent his final years restoring his father's name to a story that had outlived it, while his own name had faded from a melody that remained in constant use.

== Death ==
Portnoy died on September 12, 2026, the first day of Rosh Hashanah, which fell on Shabbat, at the age of 75. A funeral service was held on September 14 at Boulevard-Riverside Chapels in Hewlett, New York, after which he was buried on September 15 at Eretz HaChaim Cemetery in Beit Shemesh, Israel.

== Shabbat Shuvah tribute ==
Following his death, Portnoy's family organized a worldwide tribute for Shabbat Shuvah (September 19, 2026 / 8 Tishrei 5787), the Shabbat between Rosh Hashanah and Yom Kippur, inviting synagogues around the world to sing his "Eitz Chaim" melody in his memory as the Torah was returned to the ark and to tell worshippers about its composer beforehand. A tribute website, eitzchaim.co, was launched with the original 1975 recording, family photographs, and suggested synagogue announcements.

The initiative was covered in Jewish media in the United States, Canada, and Israel. In Israel, Rabbi Netanel Elyashiv publicly urged congregations to make sure they sang the text to Portnoy's melody that Shabbat. According to the family, by September 17 congregations that had committed to participate included Ohel Leah Synagogue in Hong Kong, the Jewish Community of Barcelona, Chabad of Stockholm, Congregation Shaare Tefilla of Dallas, Chabad of Oxford, Congregation Shaar Hashomayim of Montreal, Beth Jacob Congregation and B'nai David-Judea in Los Angeles, Adas Yeshurun Herzlia of Winnipeg, and the Jewish Center of Teaneck. Musicians including Yaakov Shwekey, Eli Jaffe, and Dovid Meisels published tributes and recordings of the melody in the days following his death.

== Personal life ==
Portnoy was married to Sara Portnoy; the couple had four children. His brother, Yitzchok Portnoy, lives in Baltimore.

== Discography ==
- Tanchumim (1975; LP, TG 201) – ten tracks composed by Portnoy, arranged by Yisroel Lamm; performers include Avraham Yanon, Shlomo Carlebach, Bency Schachter, and Avigdor Bernstein
- Tanchumim Vol. 2 (2001)

== Bibliography ==
- Or Eliezer (with Sara Portnoy; Lakewood, NJ, 2025) — Hebrew, with the English essay "A Son Reflects"
