= Nusach =

Nusach can refer to:

- Nusach (Jewish custom)
- Nusach (Jewish music)
