= Joseph Carlebach =

German scholar, scientist, Orthodox rabbi (1883-1942)

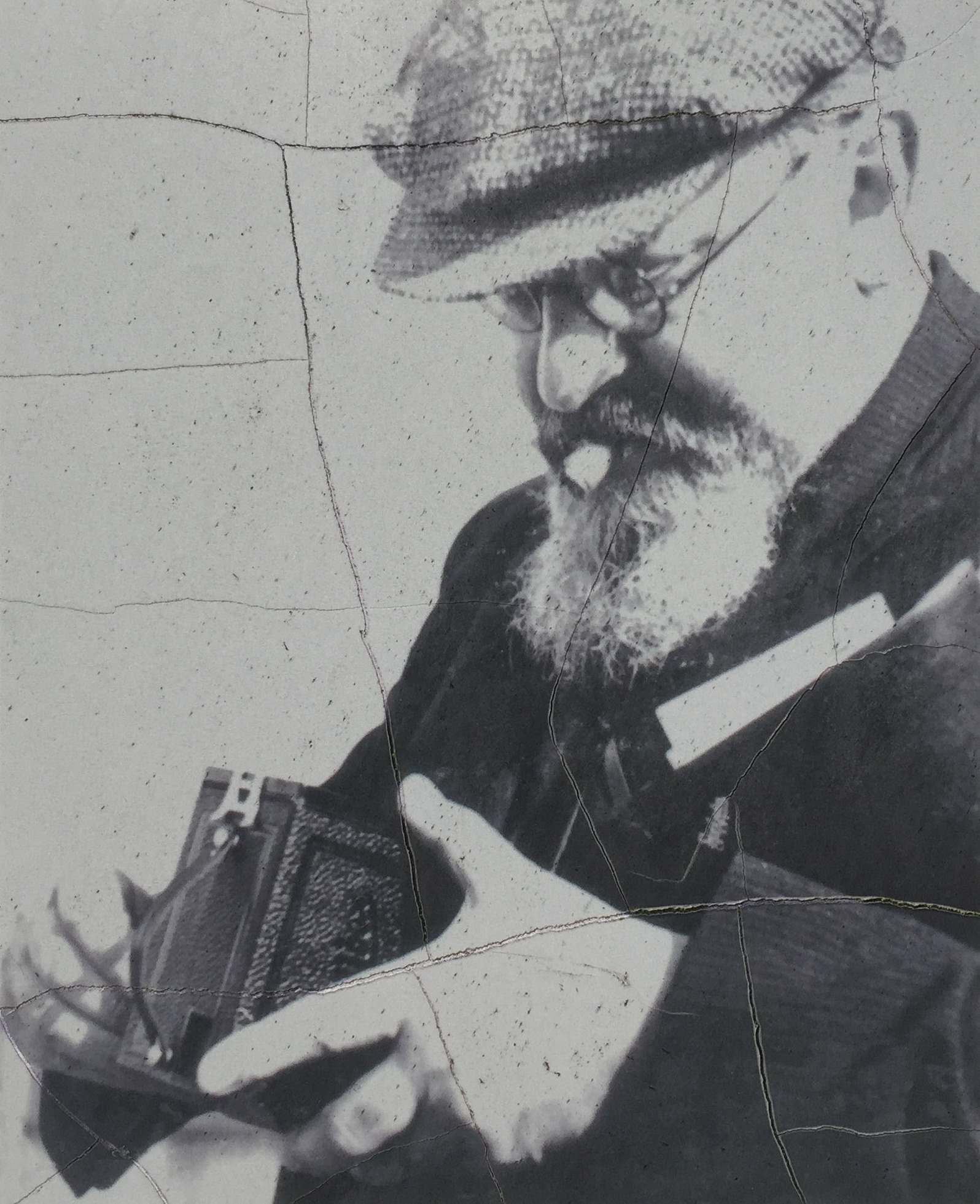
Joseph Carlebach

Joseph Hirsch (Tzvi) Carlebach (January 30, 1883, Lübeck, German Empire – March 26, 1942, Biķerniecki forest, near Riga, Latvia) was a German Orthodox rabbi, natural scientist, and scholar of the history of the Jews in Germany.

== Early life and family ==
Joseph Carlebach was born in Lübeck on 30 January 1883, the eighth of the twelve children of Rabbi Salomon Carlebach (1845–1919), chief rabbi of Lübeck, and Esther Carlebach née Adler (1853–1920), a writer and poet. Esther was a daughter of Rabbi Alexander Sussmann Adler (1816–1869), Salomon's predecessor as rabbi of Lübeck. Joseph thus belonged to the wider intermarried Yoel–Adler–Carlebach rabbinical dynasty, descended on his father's side from his grandfather, Hirsch Joseph Carlebach. Several of Joseph's brothers also became rabbis, among them Emanuel Carlebach (in Memel and Cologne), Ephraim Carlebach (in Leipzig) and Hartwig Naftali Carlebach, the father of the "singing rabbi" Shlomo Carlebach; his nephew Azriel Carlebach became founding editor of the Israeli newspapers Maariv and Yedioth Ahronoth.

He attended the Katharineum, a classical secondary school in Lübeck, and passed the Abitur (the German university-entrance examination) at Easter 1901.

In 1919 Carlebach married his former pupil Charlotte ("Lotte") Preuss (1900–1942), a daughter of the physician Julius Preuss (1861–1913). They had nine children.

== Education and scientific career ==
From 1901 Carlebach studied mainly mathematics and the natural sciences at the Friedrich-Wilhelm University in Berlin, passing his state examination as a senior secondary-school teacher (Oberlehrer) in 1905. After a period teaching in Jerusalem from 1905 to 1907, he worked as a secondary-school teacher in Berlin while preparing his doctorate.

In 1909 Carlebach was awarded a doctorate at the University of Heidelberg for a dissertation on the medieval philosopher, exegete and astronomer Levi ben Gershon (Gersonides), published as Lewi ben Gerson als Mathematiker. Ein Beitrag zur Geschichte der Mathematik bei den Juden (Berlin, 1910). Alongside his university studies he attended the Orthodox Rabbinical Seminary in Berlin as a guest student, and was ordained a rabbi in 1914.

== Teaching in Jerusalem (1905–1907) ==
Having qualified to teach mathematics and the natural sciences, the 22-year-old Carlebach was offered a teaching post at the Lämel School in Jerusalem, an institution that aimed to give its pupils vocational training alongside religious studies. The offer was made in Berlin by the school's director, Ephraim Cohen-Reiss.

Between 1905 and 1907 Carlebach lived in Jerusalem and taught at the Lämel School, years that coincided with the beginning of the Second Aliyah.

His background and manner opened to him the homes of leaders of both the Old Yishuv and the New Yishuv. He met the aged Rabbi Shmuel Salant (1816–1909), the young Rabbi Abraham Isaac Kook (1865–1935), who had reached the country about a year earlier, and knew Eliezer Ben-Yehuda (1858–1922), David Yellin (1864–1941), with whom he kept up an extensive correspondence after returning to Germany, and Yehiel Michel Pines (1843–1913).

Leiman likewise records that Carlebach was befriended by the chief rabbi Shmuel Salant, who "left an indelible impression" on him. By his own later account the Jerusalem years were "the happiest years of my life ... such happy years will never return".

Because the Lämel School taught secular subjects, it was caught up in the dispute between the Old and New Yishuv over modern education, and the Haredi rabbis of Jerusalem signed a ban on such schools. After returning to Germany, Carlebach published a detailed essay defending his decision to teach there and arguing that the ban did not fit present circumstances.

He recorded his impressions of the country in lectures and in the German and English Jewish press. One lecture, Das heilige Land ("The Holy Land"), delivered to the Montefiore Society in Berlin, was published as a booklet in 1909. In the lecture, Carlebach praised the new Jewish agricultural colonies as the brightest sign of the country's revival. He argued that a Judaism cut off from the Land of Israel could not endure. He closed the address in Hebrew, with the traditional words "Next year in Jerusalem."

== World War I and Kovno (1914–1918) ==
On the outbreak of the First World War in 1914, Carlebach published the essay Moral als Politik ("Morality as Politics"), in which he related a call for morality in public life to the prophet Jeremiah.

He served in the imperial German Army and, kept away from front-line fighting, was assigned to educational work. Under the German military administration of occupied Lithuania he settled in Kovno, where during the war he founded and directed a Hebrew secondary school (Realgymnasium). The school was modelled on the Torah im Derech Eretz outlook of Samson Raphael Hirsch, seeking to combine Torah study with modern science and a contemporary general education.

Carlebach's methods drew sharply differing assessments. Eliyahu Bils, a pupil at the school, criticised his harsh discipline, recalling that offending pupils were shut in a dark room and that corporal punishment was a daily occurrence. He eventually left over it. In contrast, the writer Sammy Gronemann, who was in Kovno in the military administration in the same years, described Carlebach as "a brilliant schoolmaster" who treated his pupils not as a stern instructor but as an older friend and colleague.

The German military government was hostile to Zionism and to expressions of Jewish nationalism, the Hebrew language included, and it monitored Carlebach's activities. He repeatedly worked around its restrictions, and on one occasion the authorities suspended him from his post for a time.

That pressure, rather than a change in his own views, is the backdrop to an incident at the school. At a large public Hanukkah celebration attended by parents, community members, rabbis, and a representative of the German command, the pupils broke into "Hatikvah", the Jewish national anthem. The song was not on the approved program, and the army treated it as a political act that could have put the school's future in danger. Carlebach rebuked the pupils afterward.

At the next year's celebration he rose with his graduating class and led the whole hall in singing the anthem himself. Gronemann took this reversal as a sign of genuine ambivalence. Seidler argues it more likely reflected Carlebach's fear of the military authorities who monitored him and had once already suspended him.≠

== Rabbinate in Lübeck, Altona and Hamburg ==
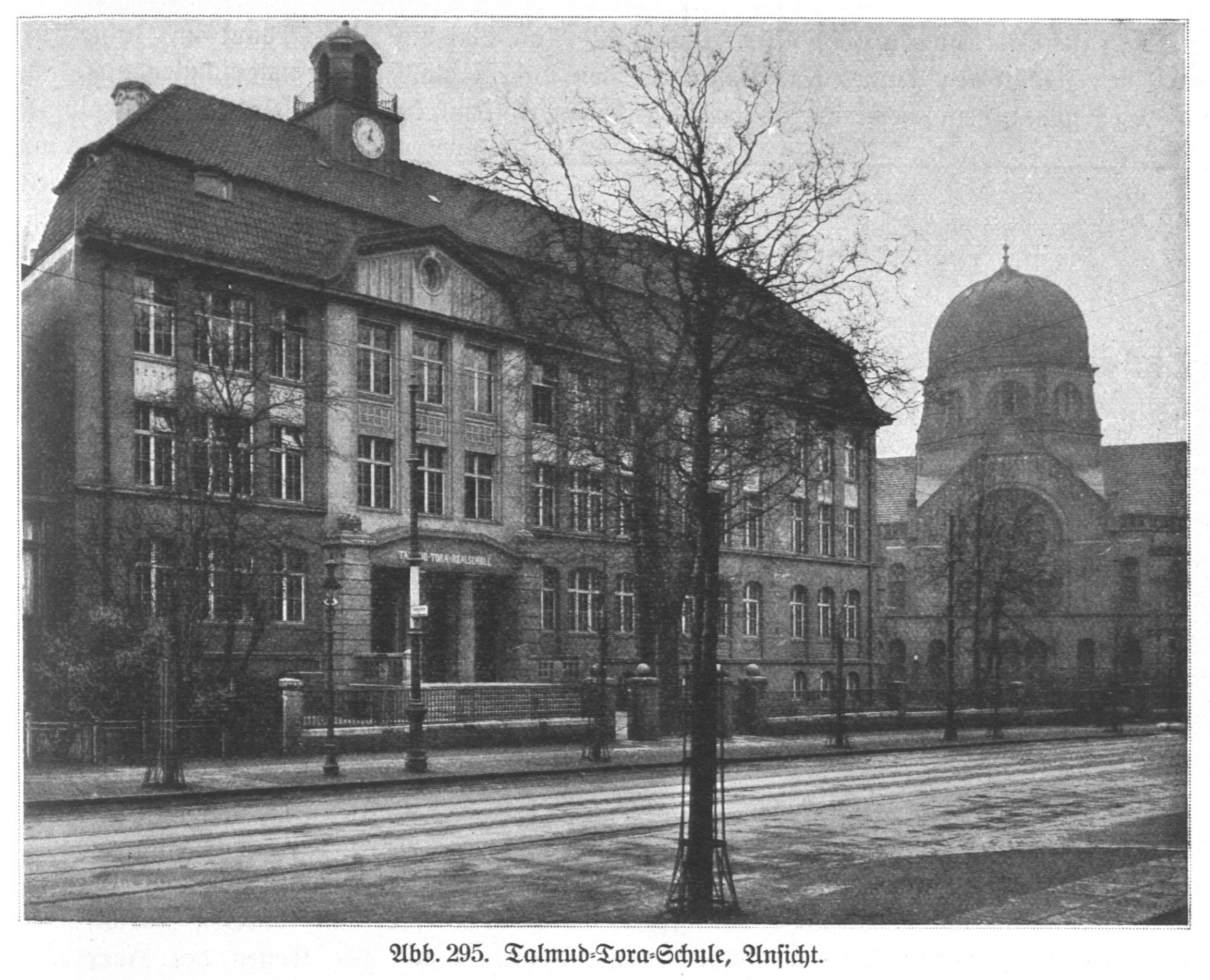
The Talmud Tora school on the Grindelhof in 1914. Carlebach was its rector from 1921 to 1926.

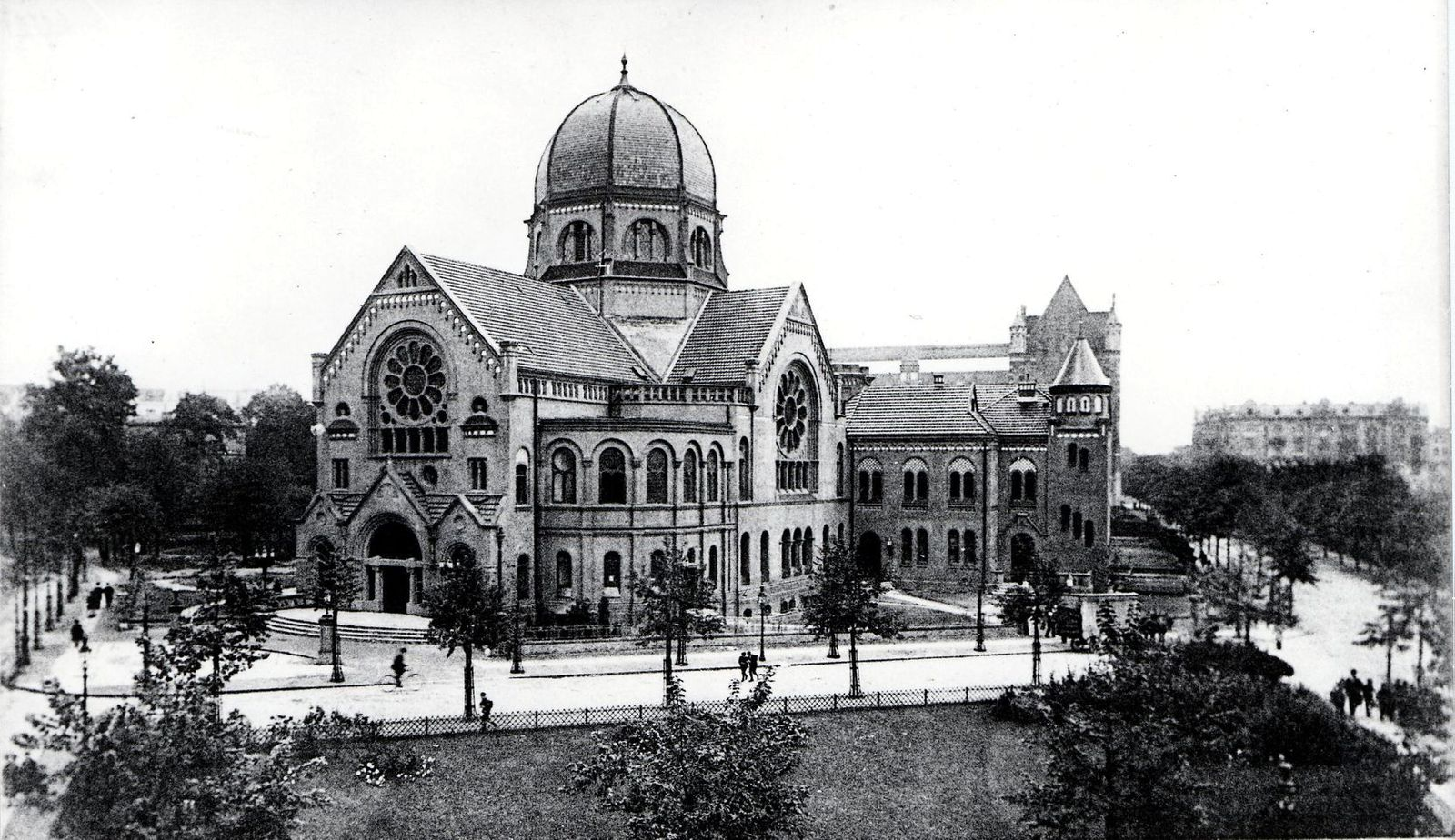
The Bornplatz Synagogue around 1906. Carlebach became its chief rabbi in 1936, his last pulpit. The Nazis demolished the building in 1939.

After the death of his father Salomon in 1919, Carlebach returned to his native Lübeck, where from 1920 he served as acting rabbi of the community until David Alexander Winter succeeded him in 1921.

In 1921 Carlebach was appointed head (Rektor) of the Talmud Tora school in Hamburg, which he led until 1926. In a reform-minded spirit he introduced independent study and experimentation, project work, and the use of art and movement in the classroom, aiming at a synthesis of Jewish and general education.

Carlebach combined an openness to the surrounding culture, unusual for an Orthodox rabbi, with strict observance of Jewish law. The Israeli jurist Haim Cohn, one of his pupils, recalled an episode that brought the two together:

He spent a full day with the boys in the Cologne Cathedral, expertly explaining every detail of the statues, the glass windows, the ornaments, and the intricacies of the Catholic faith and ritual; but I was not allowed to participate, being a Cohen who may not be under the same roof with a corpse or with tombs, lest he become impure; and although, according to the letter of the Law, it is only the Jewish dead the contact with whom renders impure, and not the non-Jewish dead, still Carlebach held that the least possibility that among the dead buried in the cathedral may have been a person of Jewish origin (even though ultimately converted to Christianity), sufficed to make the place taboo to me.

In 1925 he was elected chief rabbi (Oberrabbiner) of the Hochdeutsche Israeliten-Gemeinde (High German Israelite Community) in Altona, then still an independent Prussian city, in succession to Meir Lerner. Altona's mayor Max Brauer admired him and regularly attended his lectures. In 1935 Carlebach sailed to Haifa in Mandatory Palestine aboard the ship Tel Aviv on its maiden voyage. It was his second visit, nearly thirty years after the formative period he had spent teaching in Jerusalem, and though it came as the position of Germany's Jews was worsening, he chose to return to his Hamburg congregation rather than emigrate.

In April 1936 the Deutsch-Israelitische Gemeinde (German-Israelite Community) of Hamburg appointed Carlebach chief rabbi at the Bornplatz Synagogue, in succession to Samuel Spitzer. It was to be his last pulpit. When the Hamburg-area Jewish communities were merged at the start of 1938, the Nazi authorities refused to approve the chosen name "Deutsch-Israelitische Gemeinde zu Groß-Hamburg" (German-Israelite Community of Greater Hamburg) and the body instead took the name Jüdischer Religionsverband in Hamburg (Jewish Religious Association in Hamburg), with Carlebach continuing as its leading rabbi. His former pupil Baruch Zvi Ophir later described him as the central spiritual authority of Hamburg-Altona Jewry, revered across all currents of the community.

In 1936 the Hamburg authorities ordered the community's Grindel Jewish Cemetery, which had repeatedly been the target of antisemitic desecration in 1931 and 1932, to be given up to make way for new housing. Carlebach ruled that the exhumation and reburial of the dead, though normally forbidden under Jewish law, were permissible in the circumstances, regarding reinterment in a Jewish cemetery as a lesser evil than leaving the graves to be trampled over once the cemetery was cleared. The remains of thousands of people, by some estimates between 6,500 and 8,000, were reinterred in a common grave at the Ohlsdorf Jewish Cemetery by a deadline of 31 May 1937, and several hundred of the gravestones were re-erected at a replacement burial ground laid out in 1937–38 and designed by the Jewish architect Fritz Block.

== Persecution under the Nazi regime ==
Under Nazi rule Carlebach and his family were progressively stripped of their rights. After a tax-clearance request raised official suspicion that the family meant to emigrate, the foreign-currency office (Devisenstelle) of the chief finance president imposed a security order on his assets, blocking his bank account so that every transaction required official approval.

In 1941 he was prosecuted and fined 50 marks for not adding the compulsory forename "Israel" to his telephone entry, an omission the court treated as concealment of his Jewish origin. The penalty was steep against his monthly income of 450 marks. From 19 September 1941, he had to wear the yellow badge, and in October 1941 Jewish emigration from Germany was forbidden by secret decree.

He nonetheless continued to preach openly, speaking in his synagogue about the rise of the dictatorship even as Gestapo officers looked on. His daughter Miriam Gillis-Carlebach later documented his efforts on behalf of persecuted Jews during these years.

== Deportation and murder ==
On 6 December 1941, the Carlebach family was deported from Hamburg to the Jungfernhof concentration camp near Riga, as part of a transport of 753 Hamburg Jews and the fourth and last deportation from the city that year. By then almost sixty, Carlebach fell seriously ill in the camp. According to his daughter Miriam Gillis-Carlebach, the Gestapo had offered Carlebach the chance to remain behind, but he chose to go with the transport rather than abandon those travelling with him. By her account, in the camp he secretly organised lessons, arranged a Hanukkah celebration and several bar mitzvah ceremonies, and is said to have ruled that a fellow prisoner should eat non-kosher sausage, persuading her that the duty to preserve life and health took precedence.

On 26 March 1942 Carlebach, his wife Charlotte (née Preuss) and their three youngest daughters, Ruth, Noemi and Sara, were shot in the Biķernieki forest near Riga, in the mass killing of roughly 1,600 to 1,800 people, mostly the elderly and children, known as the Dünamünde Action.

Carlebach and his wife had earlier sent their five elder children to safety. Judith and Julius reached England on a Kindertransport in December 1938, Esther and Eva followed on individual entry permits in the spring of 1939, and Miriam left for Mandatory Palestine in October 1938, shortly before the November pogrom. Of the younger children, only his son Shlomo Carlebach (1925–2022) survived. After the war he became mashgiach ruchani at the Yeshiva Rabbi Chaim Berlin in Brooklyn. His eldest son, Julius Carlebach, became an academic sociologist and Jewish communal leader in Britain, and his daughter Miriam Gillis-Carlebach (1922–2020) became a professor of education at Bar-Ilan University and, in 1992, head of the Joseph Carlebach Institute there.

== Commemoration and legacy ==
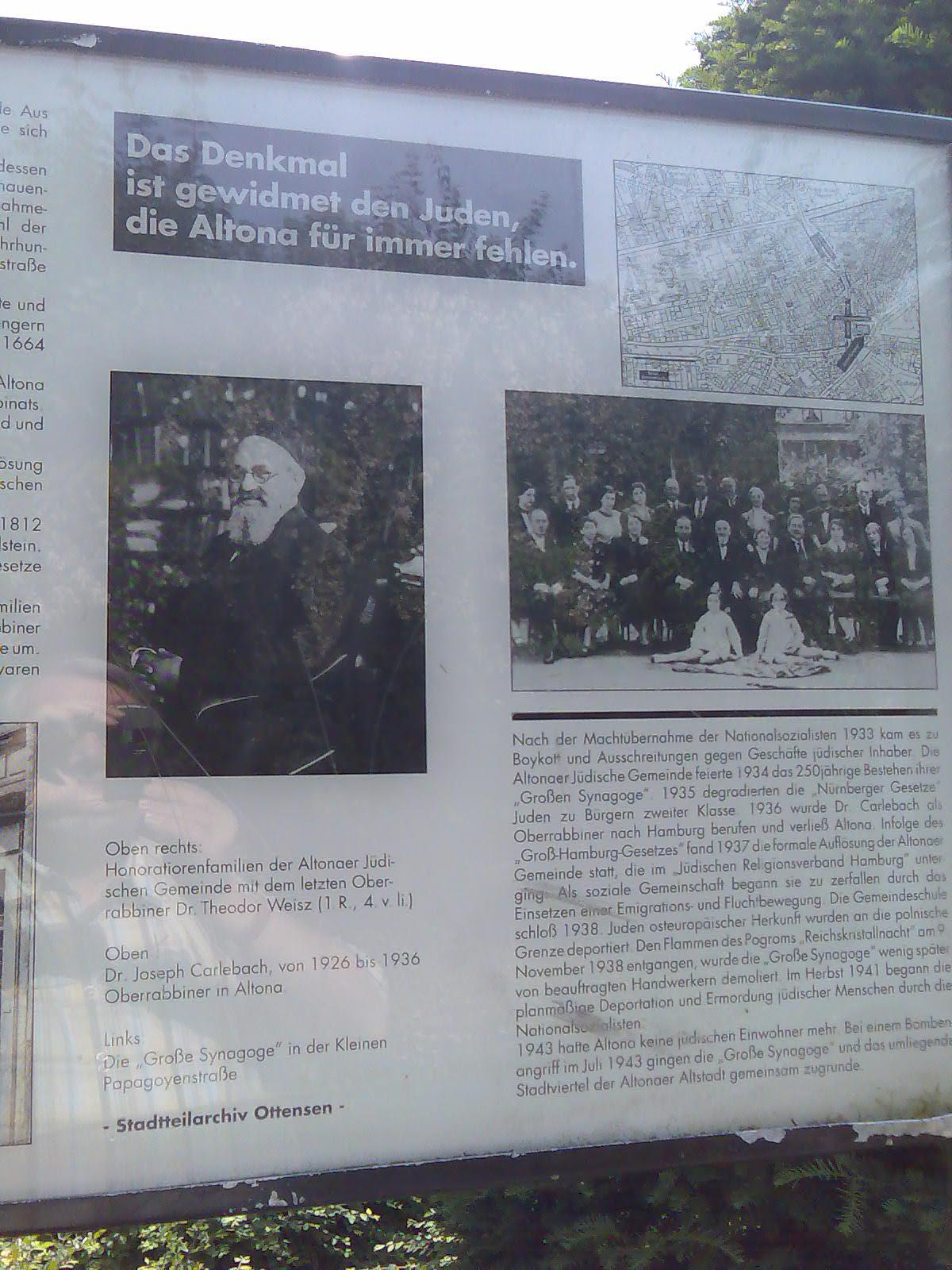
Commemorative tablet in Hamburg-Altona with a portrait of Carlebach

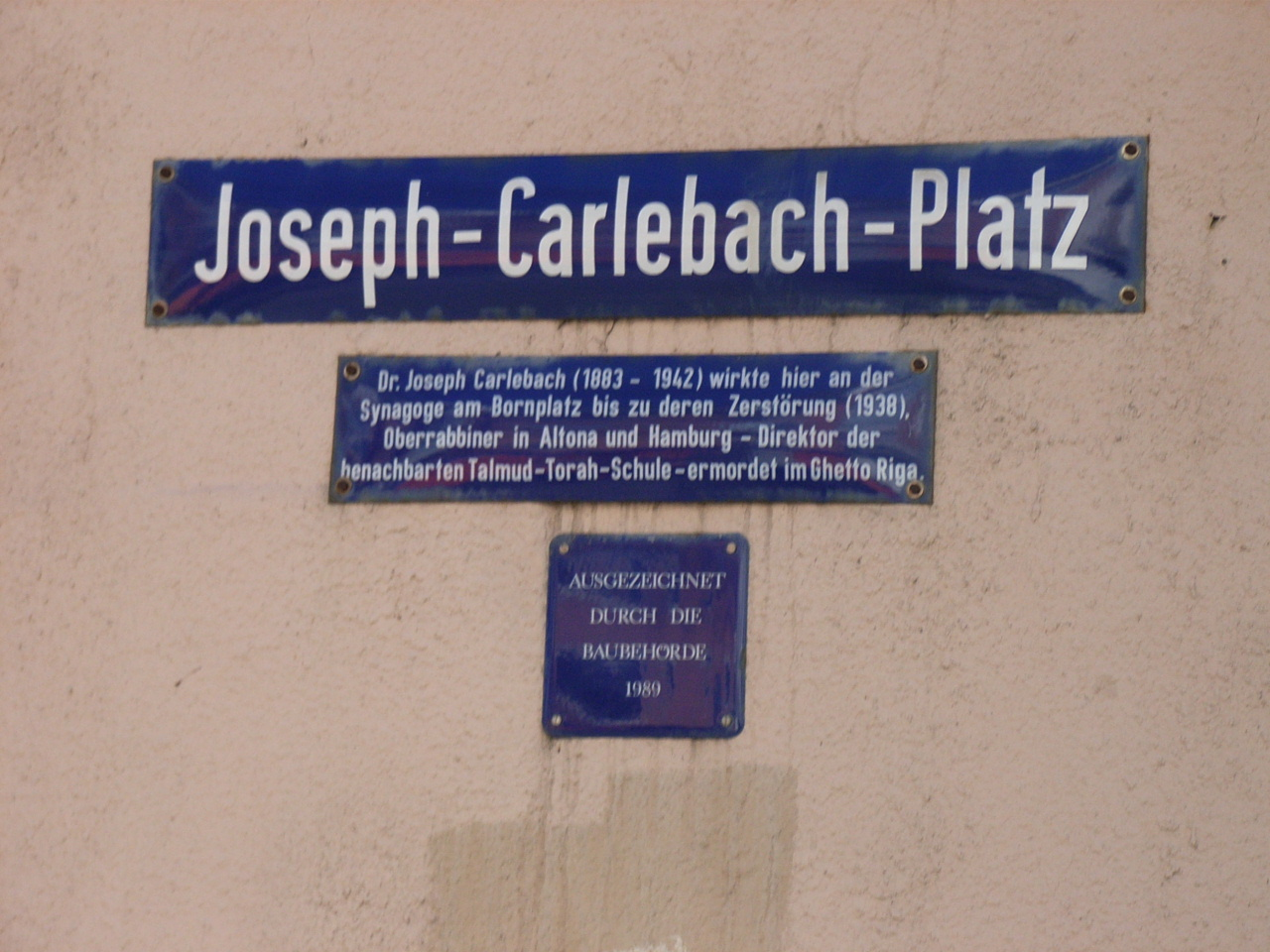
Joseph-Carlebach-Platz, Hamburg

Carlebach's memory is honoured especially in Hamburg. In 1990 the site of the former Bornplatz Synagogue, his last pulpit and now part of the University of Hamburg campus, was named Joseph-Carlebach-Platz. A granite outline of the vanished synagogue's vaulting, designed by the artist Margrit Kahl, had been laid into the square in 1988. In 2007 a Jewish day school reopened in the building of the former Talmud Tora school as the Joseph-Carlebach-Schule, resuming Jewish schooling there after 68 years. Endowed in 2003, marking what would have been his 120th birthday, the University of Hamburg's biennial Joseph-Carlebach-Preis for scholarship in Jewish history, religion and culture has been awarded every two years since 2004. In the Altona district the Carlebachstraße is named after him, and Sol LeWitt's sculpture Black Form – Dedicated to the Missing Jews stands outside the Altona town hall. Stolpersteine were laid for Carlebach and his three murdered daughters. In Lübeck the Carlebach-Park is named after the Carlebach rabbinic family.

In Israel, the Joseph Carlebach Institute was founded at Bar-Ilan University in Ramat Gan in 1992 to republish his writings and foster German-Jewish understanding. A street in the Talpiot–Arnona area of southern Jerusalem, Rehov HaRav Carlebach (רחוב הרב קרליבך), is named in his honour.

== Works ==
- Lewi ben Gerson als Mathematiker: ein Beitrag zur Geschichte der Mathematik bei den Juden. Berlin: L. Lamm, 1910. (His Heidelberg doctoral dissertation, on Levi ben Gershon.)
- Moderne pädagogische Bestrebungen und ihre Beziehungen zum Judentum. Berlin: Hebräischer Verlag "Menorah", 1925.
- Die drei grossen Propheten Jesajas, Jirmija und Jecheskel: eine Studie. Frankfurt am Main: Hermon-Verlag, 1932.
  - French translation: Les trois grands prophètes, Isaïe, Jérémie, Ézéchiel, trans. Henri Schilli. Paris: Éditions Albin Michel, 1959.
  - Hebrew translation: Sheloshet ha-neviʼim ha-gedolim: Yeshayahu, Yirmeyahu, Yeḥezkel, ed. Miriam Gillis-Carlebach. Alon Shvut: Tevunot–Herzog College; Ramat Gan: Joseph Carlebach Institute, Bar-Ilan University, 2012.
- Das gesetzestreue Judentum. Berlin: Schocken Verlag, 1936.

Posthumous editions and translations:

- Ausgewählte Schriften, ed. Miriam Gillis-Carlebach, with a foreword by Haim H. Cohn. 2 vols. Hildesheim and New York: G. Olms Verlag, 1982.
- Jüdischer Alltag als humaner Widerstand: Dokumente des Hamburger Oberrabbiners Dr. Joseph Carlebach aus den Jahren 1939–1942, ed. Miriam Gillis-Carlebach. Hamburg: Verein für Hamburgische Geschichte, 1990.
- Mikhtavim mi-Yerushalayim (1905–1906) [Letters from Jerusalem], ed. and trans. Miriam Gillis-Carlebach. Ramat Gan: Joseph Carlebach Institute; Jerusalem: Ariel, c. 1996.
- Sefer ha-sfarim [The Book of Books], Hebrew translation by Michal Barkan of his English original (1927). Ramat Gan: Joseph Carlebach Institute, Bar-Ilan University, 1999.
- Ha-masa shel Keren ha-Torah el atarei ha-tarbut ha-Yehudit ba-mizrach [The Keren HaTorah journey to the sites of Jewish culture in the East], his account of his 1936 tour of Eastern European yeshivas. Ramat Gan: Joseph Carlebach Institute, Bar-Ilan University, 2015.
