= Ephraim Cohen-Reiss =

Education pioneer (1863–1943)

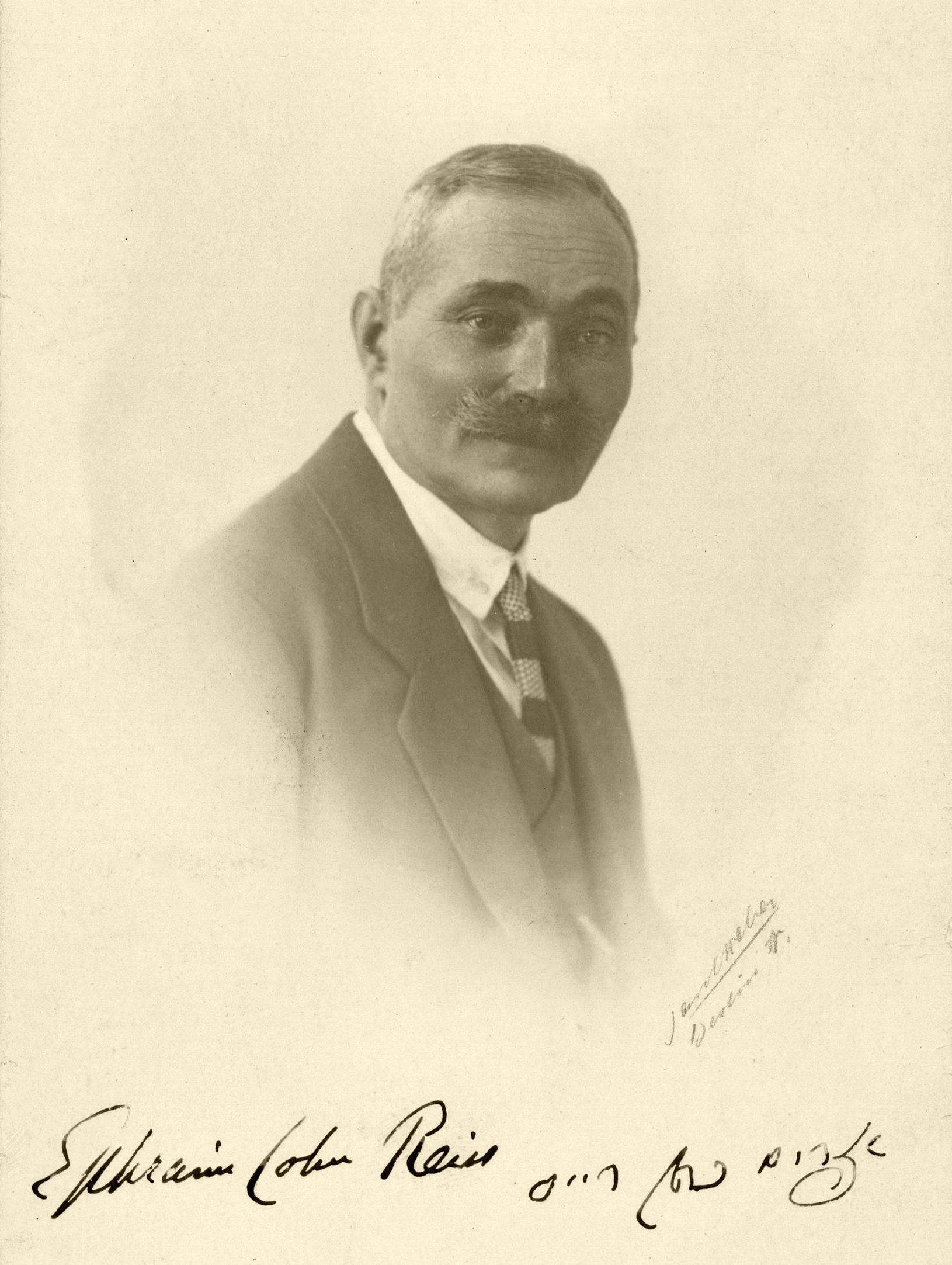
- Born: 1863; Jerusalem, Ottoman Empire
- Died: 1943 (aged 79–80); France
- Occupations: Educator, School system pioneer
- Known for: Establishing the first Hebrew school system in Palestine and the Levant
- Notable work: Founder of Israel's first co-ed school program

Ephraim Cohen-Reiss (1863 in Jerusalem – 1943 in France) was one of the pioneers of the education system in Mandatory Palestine. At the turn of the 20th century, he established the first Hebrew school system in Palestine and the Levant.

== Biography ==
Ephraim Cohen-Reiss was born in Jerusalem. When he was 15, he was sent to school in Europe. From 1878–1887 he studied in the German Empire (Bildungs-Anstalt für jüdische Lehrer, Hanover) and England. When he returned to Palestine, he was commissioned to restructure the school system. Cohen-Reiss' vision was to create a more advanced curriculum with science and arts all taught in Hebrew. Cohen-Reiss worked with his friend Eliezer Ben Yehuda, the founder of modern Hebrew, to incorporate new Hebrew words into the system. Over the next 25 years, 27 schools had been founded under his plan (including Israel's first co-ed program), and by 1912 the language of Palestine was Hebrew.

== Commemoration and legacy ==
The Cohen-Reiss Prize at King David High School in Vancouver was named after him.
