= Schneour Zalman Schneersohn =

Rabbi Schneour Zalman Schneerson
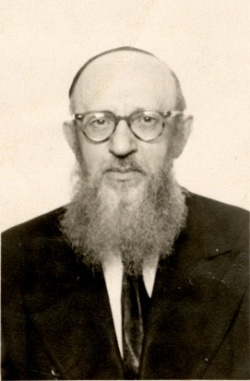
- Rabbi Schneour Zalman Schneerson
- Title: Chief Rabbi

Personal life
- Born: 1898 Gomel, Russian Empire (now Belarus)
- Died: 1980 (aged 81–82) New York, USA
- Spouse: Sara Schneerson
- Children: Shalom DovBer Schneerson and Hadassah Carlebach
- Parent(s): Menachem Mendel Schneerson (father), Liba Leah Schneerson (mother)
- Known for: Jewish resistance during WWII, aiding Jewish children
- Occupation: Rabbi
- Relatives: Descendant of Tzemach Tzedek, Levi Yitzchok of Berditchev

Religious life
- Religion: Judaism
- Denomination: Orthodox
- Movement: Chabad Lubavitch Hasidism

Schneour Zalman Schneerson (1898–1980) was a Lubavitch Hasidic Chief Rabbi who was active in France during World War II. During the Nazi occupation of France, he ran homes for children who had been separated from their families, providing them with food, shelter, and a Jewish education. Later, as the situation in France worsened, he smuggled many of them to safety.

== Biography ==
Schneour Zalman Schneersohn was born in Gomel, Russian Empire (currently in Belarus) in 1898. He belonged to the Lubavitch hassidic dynasty.

Schneersohn was descended on both sides from prestigious Hasidic families. He was the son of Menachem Mendel Schneersohn, grandson of Levi Yitzchak Schneersohn, great grandson of Baruch Shalom Schneersohn, the oldest son of the Tzemach Tzedek (Menachem Mendel Schneersohn, the third Rebbe of the Lubavitch dynasty). His mother, Liba Leah, was the granddaughter of Levi Yitzchok of Berditchev, one of the main disciples of Dov Ber of Mezeritch, himself one of the main disciples and successor of the Baal Shem Tov, the founder of Hasidism. His daughter, Hadassah, married Eli Chaim Carlebach in 1949.

Schneersohn was active in the Jewish religious resistance in the USSR, distributing funds and prayer books with the help of the Political Red Cross. In 1935, after receiving his semikhah from the Lubavitch yeshiva in Russia, he immigrated to Mandatory Palestine but after a few months, left for France on his way to the United States. In the end, he remained in France.

In 1936, he created the Association des Israélites Pratiquants (AIP) (also Kehillat Haharedim), an association of Orthodox Jews promoting religious and educational activities throughout France. The organization "provided material relief to needy Jewish refugees...founded Hebrew schools and synagogues, set up kosher soup kitchens and distributed clothing and money."

Léon Poliakov, a French historian close with Rabbi Schneersohn, claims that "his orthodoxy, of an absolute intransigence, or his working methods, as flexible as they were, were disconcerting, not to mention his manners and his dress which did not appeal to his French colleagues." He thus focused his attention on teaching children, opening eight Talmud Torah schools attended by several hundreds of children.

== Jewish children's homes ==
When the Nazis invaded France in May 1940, Schneersohn was forced to leave Paris. Wherever he went, he relocated the AIP with him. From February 1940 to March 1944, he opened a series of homes for children in cooperation with the AIP and the OSE (Œuvre de Secours aux Enfants). The first was established in Chateau des Morelles in Brout-Vernet.

In 1941, he traveled to Marseilles. In the wooded and hilly east of the city, he rented la Maison de Beaupin as a home for children whose parents had been arrested. After the arrest of several children in Marseilles on 12 August 1942, he moved the children to a property in Dému, in the southwest of France.

In 1943, when the Germans expanded their territory in France., Schneersohn moved the children to Voiron, near Saint-Etienne-de-Crosse, in the Italian-occupied zone of l'Isere.

On 6 September 1943, the children were taken to Nice in the belief it would be safer since the Italians had changed sides to the Allies. But the Germans were waiting and on 10 September, invaded, rounding up and deporting 6,000 people. The children were smuggled back to Isère. Two members of the party were caught and the rabbi and his family were forced into hiding.

That winter, the children who remained were hidden in five locations in the area. On the l night of 22 March, one of these locations, La Martelliere, was raided. Sixteen boys and one woman, the mother of two brothers in the group, were arrested and deported. Only one of the boys survived the war. The same afternoon, Sara Schneerson, the rabbi's wife, was arrested in La Manche, close to Voiron, where the rabbi and some of his students had found a hiding place. She was taken to the French Millice headquarters, interrogated and tortured, but she maintained that the rabbi had escaped to Switzerland, not giving away his true hiding place. After her release, she walked around for miles instead of going straight to her husband's hideaway in order to mislead her torturers. Her ploy worked and the hiding place was not discovered.

As Chana Arnon-Benninga describes, "From then on, until the liberation of Grenoble, on 22 August 1944, the children, the rabbi, his wife and the young adults, were hidden at different places in the Voiron area, some not seeing the light of day for weeks on end. At liberation, the Schneerson family returned to Paris, taking some of the survivors with them; others went back to La Manoir to take care of some of the orphans helped by students who wanted to stay on. In September 1946, the youth home closed its doors definitely, the last members relocating to Boissy-Saint-Leger, in the Paris area."

Much of what is known about Rabbi Schneersohn is thanks to the historian Léon Poliakov, who was the rabbi's personal secretary, and became secretary of the AIP in 1943. Poliakov would tell in 1997 that he became acquainted with of Chief Rabbi Schneersohn when he was looking for a rabbi to officiate at his father's funeral. Later, on the Canebière in Marseille, he met Chief Rabbi Schneersohn who offers him the position of secretary. Their collaboration lasted several months until Poliakov gave up following ideological differences – he opposed the idea to contact Joseph Goebbels – and religious differences. Poliakov later went on to found, together with Rabbi Schneersohn's cousin, Isaac Schneersohn, the Shoah Memorial, Center of Contemporary Jewish Documentation.

=== Timeline of locations ===
- February 1940 – January 1941:
  - Château des Morelles, Brout-Vernet (Allier).
- April 1942:
  - Villa Beaupin, in the Vieille Chapelle district of Marseilles
- November 1942:
  - Domaine de Seignebon, at Dému (Gers).
- 1942–1944: successively :
  - Grenoble.
  - Château du Manoir, hameau de L'Étang-Dauphin, Saint-Étienne-de-Crossey (Isère), Beginning in March 1943.
  - pension Cavalier and Hôtel Rivoli, at Nice. 1943 (...-October 1943).
  - Château du Manoir (return) from October 1943 to December 1943, then dispersal of the children in three hamlets close to Voiron (Isère):
    - La Manche, hameau de Saint-Jean-de-Moirans (Isère), in December 1943.
    - La Martellière, Voiron (Isère), also in December 1943. 16 children, aged 7 to 21, and two adults are arrested there by the milice during the night of 23 March to March 1944, following a denunciation. The children are deported in the Convoi 71 of 13 April 1944 and the Convoi n° 73 of 15 May 1944.
    - hameau de Chirens (Isère) and Saint-Étienne-de-Crossey (a room), starting in October 1943.

== Descriptions of Schneersohn ==
In his book on Jewish Résistance in France, Lucien Lazare describes the role of Schneersohn:

Having moved to Vichy, then to Marseille, the AIP had gathered together a community of sixty or so persons, composed of a Synagogue, a welfare office, a Yeshiva, a home for children and a workshop for vocational placement. Chneerson intended his services to Orthodox Judaism. Placed in the marginality of the Jewish organizations, the AIP was the expression of a particular category of the Jewish identity. Very popular before the war in Central Europe and Eastern Europe as well as in Palestine, Hasidism counted fervent followers within the community of the Jewish immigrants in Paris. Rejecting at once emancipation, Zionism and Socialism, Chneerson only conceived Jewish existence in the jealous observance of rites and put up an impenetrable barrier against the influence of the environment and modernity. His experience of secular persecutions had taught him to respond by establishing a community with unfailing cohesion, devoting itself to the study of sacred texts and the observance of the Mitzvot in the enthusiastic atmosphere of the hassidic tradition. It is in this framework that he himself and his follower felt safe, leaving it to Providence. Chneerson had not discerned the novel and fatal character of the nazi threat, and the AIP was particularly vulnerable to the deportations.

In "L'Auberge des musiciens", Léon Poliakov describes Schneersohn ("red beard, limping slightly in his caftan according to the Polish custom") and his activities at Marseille:

About a hundred or so persons prayed in the oratory of the rue Sylvabelle in a rich-looking building in of the most beautiful neighborhoods at Marseille [...] [There] two large rooms and a hall in the first floor, a kitchen and two rooms in the mezzanine [...]. The rabbi taking refuge with his family on the first floor. The kitchen doesn't stay empty either: furtive shadows appeared in the evening and vanished in the morning; these are escapees of the internment camps of Vichy to whom the rabbi gives refuge. One of the rooms of the first floor serves as an office and as a function room – a never-ending stream of Jewish miseries -, the other, the office of the rabbi, is at the same time a synagogue and a classroom; there weddings are celebrated and divorces are settled and even financial disputes.

In his private diary, Raymond-Raoul Lambert, who headed the UGIF-Sud, the Vichy government's Union of French Jews, writes on 17 August 1943:

The 28 (28 July 1943) I go, with Simone and the children, to visit a home for children close to Voiron, headed by an orthodox rabbin who resembles Rasputin. In such a milieu I feel Christian and Latin.

The Israeli historian Richard Cohen thus explains Lambert's reaction:

It's about rabbi Isaac Chneerson [sic] who was responsible of an ultra-orthodox charitable organization (Association des Israélites pratiquants de France, Kehillath Haharedim), affiliated to the 3e Direction de l'UGIF (Santé). The "assimilated" response by RRL [Raymond-Raoul Lambert] is not surprising, considering the content of the letter by the latter (2 August 1943, YIVO: RG 340, dossier 3) which deals into the details of his fantastic project to establish a Jewish State based on strictly orthodox principles.

In a recent book entitled Les enfants de la Martellière, Delphine Deroo reconstitutes the life of this institution. She is openly admiring of the rabbi's work:

To each threat corresponds a defense. To the wish of physical and spiritual elimination of the "Jewish Race", these men and women opposed themselves as Jews, assuming with pride their endangered Jewishness. And this moral resistance, that on my part I encounter in the insistence of rabbi Chneerson [Schneour Zalman Schneersohn] to strictly observe the religious laws – showing for him the very essence of his directly threatened Judaism -, strikes me and dazzles me by its strength and by its heroism.

== After the war ==
After the war, Schneersohn worked to promote non-consistorial Orthodox Judaism from his office at 10 rue Dieu, in the 10th arrondissement of Paris near Place de la République. He continued to direct the AIP, organizing religious services and Jewish schools, as well as locating and rehabilitating children hidden in Christian homes during the war.

Several personalities later attested to the influence of his teaching, including Olga Katunal, according to whom Zalman Schneurson was her greatest teacher,

In the 1960s, Schneour Zalman Schneersohn immigrated to the United States, and continued to work as a teacher in Brooklyn, New York, where he founded and directed SHEVET Y'HUDAH Resnick Institute of Technology (SYRIT).

He died in New York at the age of 82.

== Bibliography ==
- Serge Klarsfeld. Le Mémorial de la Déportation des Juifs de France. Beate et Serge Klarsfeld: Paris, 1978.
- Léon Poliakov. L'Auberge des musiciens. Mémoires. Paris, 1981.
- Lambert, Raymond-Raoul [in French] (1985). Cohen, Richard I. (ed.). Carnet d'un témoin: 1940–1943 (in French). Fayard. ISBN 978-2-213-01549-1.

- Lambert, Raymond-Raoul [in French] (15 October 2007). Cohen, Richard I. (ed.). Diary of a witness 1940-1943: The experience of French Jews in The Holocaust. Translated by Best, Isabel. Ivan R. Dee. ISBN 978-1-56663-740-4.

- Lucien Lazare (1987). La Résistance juive en France. Stock. ISBN 978-2-234-02080-1.
- Judith Friedlander (1990). Vilna on the Seine: Jewish Intellectuals in France Since 1968. Yale University Press. ISBN 978-0-300-04703-5.
- Susan Zuccotti (1993). The Holocaust, the French, and the Jews. Basic Books. ISBN 0-465-03034-3.
- Renée Poznanski (1994). Être juif en France pendant la Seconde Guerre mondiale. Hachette Book Group USA. ISBN 978-2-01-013109-7.
- Donna F. Ryan (1996). The Holocaust & the Jews of Marseille: The Enforcement of Anti-Semitic Policies in Vichy France. University of Illinois Press. ISBN 978-0-252-06530-9.
- Delphine Deroo (1999). Les enfants de La Martellière. Grasset & Fasquelle. ISBN 978-2-246-56921-3.
- Anne Grynberg (1999). Les camps de la honte: Les internés juifs des camps français (1939-1944). Editions La Découverte. ISBN 978-2-7071-3046-4.
- Claude Muller (2003). Les sentiers de la liberté: Dauphiné, 1939-1945 : les témoignages de nombreux résistants et déportés. Editions De Borée. ISBN 978-2-84494-195-4.
- Renée Dray-Bensousan (2004). Les juifs à Marseille pendant La Seconde Guerre mondiale: août 1939--août 1944. Belles Lettres. ISBN 978-2-251-38066-7.
- Limor Yagil (2005). Chrétiens et Juifs sous Vichy (1940-1944): Sauvetage et désobéissance civile. Cerf. ISBN 978-2-204-07585-5.
- Ḥanah Sheneʼursohn (April 2003). A mother in Israel: the life and memoirs of Rebbetzin Chana Schneerson of blessed memory : mother of Rabbi Menachem M. Schneerson, the Lubavitcher Rebbe, z. ts. ṿe-ḳ. l.l.h.h.] Kehot Publication Society. ISBN 0-8266-0099-9.
- Gérard Haddad (2007). Le péché originel de la psychanalyse: Lacan et la question juive. Seuil. ISBN 978-2-02-091253-2.
- Joan Nathan. Bread of Freedom in Times of Despair. The New York Times, 16 April 2008 (Section Dining & Wine).
- Samuel Heilman; Menachem Friedman (30 May 2010). The Rebbe: The Life and Afterlife of Menachem Mendel Schneerson. Princeton University Press. ISBN 978-0-691-13888-6.
- Elie Feuerwerker. "Further Corrections". Hamodia. New York. 13 October 2010.
