= Neshama Carlebach =

American musician (born 1974)

Neshama Carlebach (Hebrew: נשמה קרליבך; born October 9, 1974) is an American singer, songwriter, educator, author, and rabbinical student. She began her singing career performing with her father, Rabbi Shlomo Carlebach. Her music and writing has reached millions within the Jewish community and in interfaith spaces, addressing social issues in America, Israel and Jewish communities spanning the world. While her spiritual origins were within the Orthodox Jewish community, she has also found a community in the Reform Jewish movement and beyond.

== Personal life ==
Carlebach was born in New York City and began performing publicly as a child. She trained as a vocalist and actress and later developed a professional career combining music, education, and spiritual leadership. Her artistic development drew on Jewish liturgical traditions as well as contemporary and interfaith musical influences.

In November 2017, Carlebach became engaged to Rabbi Menachem Creditor, an author and teacher. They married in August 2018. In response to the October 7 attack on Israel, they worked together to raise awareness and support for those affected, especially the families of Israeli hostages.

== Career ==
Carlebach has performed and taught in cities worldwide, has sung on the Broadway stage, has sold more than one million records, has sparked public conversation about the place of women in Judaism, the importance of religious pluralism, and her own experiences as a woman. She was a six-time entrant in the 2011 Grammy Awards. Carlebach was also one of the creators of the Broadway play Soul Doctor.

In 2006, Carlebach helped organize a benefit concert at the New Orleans International Jewish Music Festival that raised awareness and funds for local Jewish institutions shattered by Hurricane Katrina the previous year. In 2012, she performed at an interfaith peace summit at Mt. Fuji, Japan and at a Holocaust commemoration at Auschwitz, where she has led healing musical experiences regularly as part of The March of the Living, beginning in 1997.

In November 2016, Carlebach was inducted into the Brooklyn Hall of Fame, where she received a Certificate of Congressional Recognition for her work.

In 2018, Neshama Carlebach's career was impacted by renewed communal conversations regarding allegations made against her father, Rabbi Shlomo Carlebach, following his death. Though these concerns did not pertain to her own conduct, some institutions and venues reconsidered her participation in certain programs as part of broader discussions about legacy, accountability, and communal values. In response, Carlebach has addressed her personal experience publicly and has emerged as a leader in conversations about abuse awareness and healing, facilitating workshops and communal dialogues that engage the complexities of trauma, responsibility, and repair. These efforts, including performing at some of the synagogues that had placed a moratorium on her father's music, have become a notable component of her public work and contribution to Jewish communal life.

Carlebach achieved notable success at the 18th Annual Independent Music Awards for her 2019 album, Believe, for which she won the Vox Pop (Fan Favorite) award in the Adult Contemporary Song category for the title track.

In the aftermath of the October 7, 2023 attack on Israel, Neshama created new music and organized an American concert series that raised half a million dollars in support of efforts in Israel to heal and rebuild.

In the summer of 2024, Carlebach shared that she was in the midst of a years-long journey to become a rabbi and had begun her formal studies at the Academy for Jewish Religion.

== Discography ==
- Soul (1996)
- Ha Neshama Shel Shlomo (1997)
- Dancing With My Soul (2000)
- Ani Shelach (2001)
- Journey (2004)
- One and One (2008)
- Higher & Higher (2010)
- Every Little Soul Must Shine (2011)
- Soul Daughter (2015)
- Believe (2019)
