= Carlebach minyan =

Jewish prayer service

A Carlebach minyan or neo-Hasidic minyan is a Jewish prayer service that follows the style of Rabbi Shlomo Carlebach and uses the melodies he composed for many prayers.

These minyanim are distinctive for their emphasis on singing the liturgy, often using Carlebach's original nigunim. They are usually held for the Friday night services at the beginning of Shabbat, though they can be held on other occasions.

According to Rabbi Jonathan Rosenblatt, Carlebach "changed the expectations of the prayer experience from decorous and somber to uplifting and ecstatic as he captivated generations with elemental melodies and stories of miraculous human saintliness, modesty and unselfishness."

The world's first Carlebach minyan (other than the Synagogues of Carlebach himself) was Shirat Shlomo Congregation in Efrat. It opened its doors in 1993 and is still active.

== See also ==
- Jewish prayer
- Carlebach movement
- Baal teshuva movement
- Music of Israel
