= Ezriel Carlebach =

Journalist and editorial writer

Azriel Carlebach
- עזריאל קרליבך
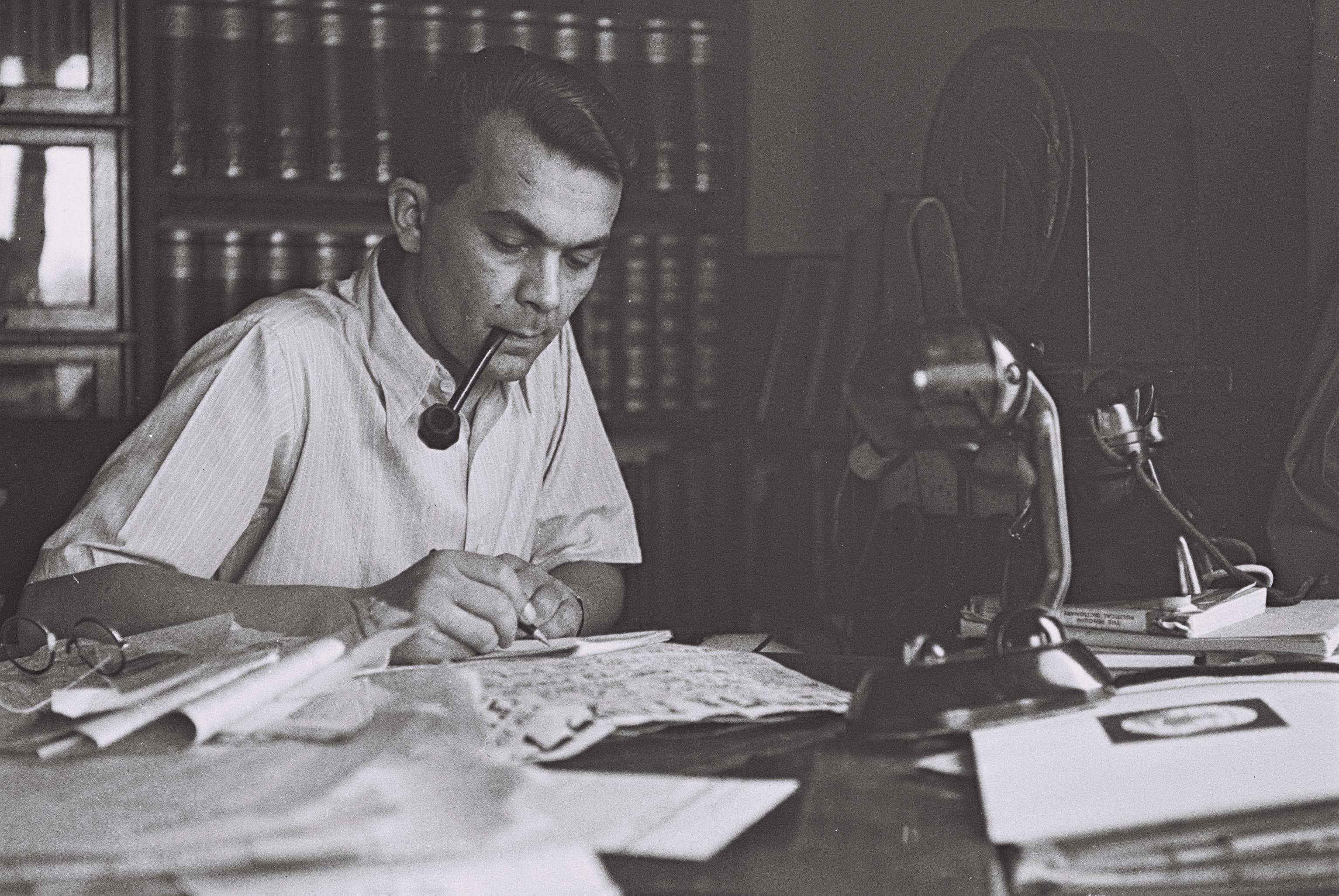
- Ezriel Carlebach, 1942
- Born: Esriel Gotthelf Carlebach; November 7, 1908; Leipzig, Kingdom of Saxony, German Empire
- Died: February 12, 1956 (aged 46); Tel Aviv, Israel
- Citizenship: Israeli
- Education: Doctor of Law
- Alma mater: Frederick William University of Berlin, University of Hamburg
- Occupations: Journalist and editorial writer

Ezriel Carlebach (also Azriel; born Esriel Gotthelf Carlebach, Hebrew: עזריאל קרליבך, Yiddish: עזריאל קארלעבאך; November 7, 1908 – February 12, 1956) was a leading journalist and editorial writer during the period of Jewish settlement in Mandatory Palestine and during the early days of the state of Israel. He was the first editor-in-chief of Israel's two largest newspapers, Yediot Ahronot, and then Ma'ariv.

== Biography ==
Ezriel Carlebach was born in the city of Leipzig, Germany, descendant of a family of rabbis. His parents were Gertrud Jakoby and Ephraim Carlebach (1879–1936), a rabbi and founder of Höhere Israelitische Schule in Leipzig. Ezriel had three sisters, Hanna, Rachel (Shemut) and Cilly, and two brothers, David and Joseph (Yotti).

He studied at two yeshivot in Lithuania. First at the Slobodka yeshiva in Kaunas' suburb Slobodka (now Kaunas-Vilijampolė), then with Rabbi Joseph Leib Bloch at the Rabbinical College of Telshe (Hebrew: Yeshivat Telz ישיבת טלז) in Telšiai. He recalled this time in two articles in the journal Menorah.

In 1927 he immigrated to Mandatory Palestine, there learning in Abraham Isaac Kook's Mercaz haRav yeshiva, though afterwards becoming secular. In Jerusalem, one family regularly invited him – as usual for Talmud students – on Shabbat for a free meal. His host had a son, Józef Grawicki, who worked in Warsaw as Sejm-correspondent for the Yiddish daily Haynt (הײַנט, also Hajnt, Engl.: Today).

On his way for a visit in Germany, Carlebach stopped in Warsaw, and visited Józef Grawicki, who encouraged him to write for Haynt in Yiddish. One of his articles explored the conflict between the Zionist Rabbi Abraham Kook and the anti-Zionist Rabbi Yosef Chaim Sonnenfeld in Jerusalem.

Carlebach's three uncles - Emanuel Carlebach (1874–1927) and Leopold Rosenak (1868–1923; an uncle by marriage), both Field Rabbis of the Imperial German Army, and the educator Rabbi Joseph Carlebach, who was assigned to them in 1915 - were active in promoting German culture among the Jews in Lithuania and Poland during the German occupation (1915–1918). Erich Ludendorff's intention was to evoke pro-German attitudes among Jews, in order to prepare the installation of a Polish and a Lithuanian state dependent on Germany. Part of the effort was the establishment of Jewish newspapers (e.g. the folkist Warszawer Togblat ווארשאווער טאָגבלאט), of Jewish organisations (e.g. Emanuel Carlebach initiated in Łomża the foundation of the Hassidic umbrella organisation Agudas Yisroel of Poland, part of a non-Zionist movement founded in Germany in 1912) and of modern educational institutions of Jewish alignment. Joseph Carlebach founded the partly German-language Jüdisches Realgymnasium גימנזיום עברי in Kaunas and directed it until 1919. Carlebach's uncles mostly came down for Hassidim and faced Zionists rather critically. Thus the name Carlebach sounded rather suspicious to the ears of Haynt's audience.

From 1929 Carlebach lived in Germany and studied at the Frederick William University of Berlin and the University of Hamburg, receiving a degree as a doctor of law.

Carlebach died of a heart attack on February 12, 1956, at the age of 47. Thousands attended his funeral.

== Journalism career ==
Carlebach wrote for Israelitisches Familienblatt. When Haynt, stricken by a strike, asked for help, Carlebach sent articles from Germany without payment. Haynt later financed Carlebach's expeditions to Jewish communities all over Europe and the Mediterranean, covering communities like the Lithuanian Karaites, Sephardi Jews of Thessaloniki (to be later almost completely extinguished by the Nazi occupants), Maghrebian Mizrahi Jews, Yemenite Teimanim, and the crypto-Jewish Dönmeh (Sabbateans) in Turkey as well as Mallorquin Conversos, some of whom he detected while travelling.

Carlebach sent regular reports to Haynt, which later became the basis for a book. He also wrote a series of articles describing his travels through Germany, including an encounter with an antisemitic gang which left him severely beaten.

In June 1931 a publishing house in Leipzig, Deutsche Buchwerkstätten, awarded him its novelist prize of the year, which he shared with Alexander von Keller. Carlebach's novel is set in the Jewish quarter of Jerusalem's old city.

He also worked as a freelance journalist for newspapers such as the Hebrew Haaretz, and starting in 1931 – under a permanent appointment – with the Hamburg-based Israelitisches Familienblatt. This paper presented in its cultural insert music, performing and visual art by examples of creative works by Jewish artists. Four to five evenings of the week Carlebach went to the theatre and afterwards composed his reviews, dictating them – freely phrasing – to his assistant Ruth Heinsohn, who right away typed them.

In summer 1932 – again financed by Haynt – he travelled to the USSR, among others to Crimea and Birobidzhan, in order to give an account of Jewish life under communist reign. In his report ('Sowjetjudäa', In: Israelitisches Familienblatt and in Haynt) he came to the conclusion that there were neither the possibilities nor an adequate milieu for a genuine Jewish life.

Albert Einstein occasionally brought the Sowjetjudäa series up for discussions, so that they had a much broader response than usual. Especially adversaries of Hitler, who relied on the USSR and who naïvely or willfully downplayed the crimes there, were incited to question their stance or to be angry with Carlebach. He assessed the broad controversy on the subject being a journalistic success.

"The articles brought forth a flurry of anonymous threatening letters and a vile pamphlet attack upon him from Hamburg's 'Jewish Workers' Study Group.'" The camouflage name of this group (in German: Arbeitsgemeinschaft jüdischer Werktätiger, Hamburg) aimed at rather disguising the harassing of Carlebach, the avowed Jew, by the Communist Youth Federation, section Hamburg.

On the night of January 3, 1933, the harassment culminated in an assassination attempt. A gunshot cut through his hat just luckily missing him. Carlebach fell over, got concussed and lost consciousness. The police found him later senseless. Israelitisches Familienblatt offered a reward of 2,000 reichsmarks for the capture of the person who did it. By February he had recovered so far that he could resume his work for Israelitisches Familienblatt. Soon after he moved to Berlin.

Such experience notwithstanding he continued to attack Nazism. Earlier Carlebach had discovered that Joseph Goebbels, who so vehemently defamed Jews and their alleged detrimental influence, had studied with Jewish professors.

Right after the seizure of power by the Nazis, Carlebach was arrested. He attributed the arrest to Goebbels, who resented Carlebach for revealing his Jewish connections. Carlebach was released from custody because no judicial warrant existed but was forced to go into hiding. He found people who provided him with a hideout and forged papers. In order to move about in the streets of Berlin, Carlebach dyed his hair and dressed in an SA uniform. In this way, he monitored from within how Nazism tightened its power in Germany and wrote daily articles for Haynt in Warsaw under the pseudonym Levi Gotthelf (לוי גאָטהעלף).

On May 10, 1933, he incognito attended as an observer the central book-burning on Opernplatz in Berlin, where also his books were thrown into the fires. Meanwhile, Haynt strove to get Carlebach out of the country. Finally – bearing the counterfeited papers of an Upper Silesian coal miner – he was smuggled over the border close to city of Katowice in the then Polish part of Upper Silesia.

Carlebach's series of articles, being the first inside story on the Nazis' takeover, appeared in Haynt and was republished in Forwerts (פֿאָרווערטס) in New York. In concert with the Zionist Jehoszua Gottlieb, the folkist journalist Saul Stupnicki (Chief editor of Lubliner Tugblat לובלינער טאָגבלאט) and others Carlebach organised in Poland a countrywide series of lectures named Literary Judgments on Germany. The German ambassador to Poland, Hans-Adolf von Moltke, attended the start lecture in Warsaw, sitting in the first line.

Carlebach was then permanently appointed at modest salary with Haynt, whose articles – like that one on 'The anti-Semitic International' (of Nuremberg) reappeared in other newspapers such as Nowy Dziennik in Kraków, Chwila in Lwów, Di Yidishe Shtime (די יידישע שטימע) in Kaunas, Frimorgn (פֿרימאָרגן) in Riga and Forverts in New York.

Living in Polish exile he got onto the second list (March 29, 1934) of Germans, which were arbitrarily officially denaturalised according to a new law, which also ensued the seizure of all his property in Germany.

In 1933 and 1934 Carlebach traveled for Haynt to report on the Zionist Congress, the International Congress of National Minorities and Goebbels' speech as German main delegate at the League of Nations in Geneva on September 29, 1933. His speech An Appeal to the Nations was an éclat and the subsequent press conference accordingly well attended. Nevertheless, on the sidelines Carlebach and Goebbels had a sharp argument on co-operatives exemplified by the newspaper company Haynt.

Carlebach reported how the Upper Silesian Franz Bernheim succeeded to prompt the League of Nations (Bernheim petition) to coerce Germany to abide by the German-Polish Accord on East Silesia. According to that treaty each contractual party guaranteed in its respective part of Upper Silesia equal civil rights for all the inhabitants. So in September 1933 the Reich's Nazi government suspended in Upper Silesia all antisemitic discriminations already imposed and excepted the province from all new such invidiousnesses to be decreed, until the Accord expired in May 1937.

In 1935 Carlebach was appointed chief editor of daily Yidishe Post (יידישע פאָסט) in London. But he continued to cover travelling the rest of Europe, except of Germany. In Selbstwehr (Prague) Carlebach published a regular column Tagebuch der Woche (diary of the week). In April 1935 Carlebach called attention to Kurt Schuschnigg's antisemitic policy in Austria in an interview with the Federal Chancellor. He adopted an increasingly sharper tone in relation to non-Zionists, whose intentions to stay in Europe, he regarded negligent in view of the development. From 1936 on British policy on Mandatory Palestine (Peel Commission) stood at the centre of Carlebach's editing.

In 1937 Carlebach immigrated to Mandatory Palestine under an appointment as foreign correspondent of Yidishe Post. In the same year he became a journalist at the newspaper Yedioth Ahronoth, afterwards becoming its editor. In early 1939 Carlebach travelled again to Warsaw, meeting with friends there – not knowingly to see many of them for the last time.

In 1948, while chief editor of Yedioth Ahronoth, a disagreement broke out between Carlebach and Yehuda Mozes, owner of the paper. Carlebach and several senior journalists left Yedioth Ahronoth and founded a new newspaper, Yedioth Maariv, which first appeared on February 15, 1948, with Carlebach as its chief editor. After several months, the paper's name was changed to Maariv, to avoid confusion between it and Yedioth Ahronoth.

Ezriel Carlebach edited the Maariv newspaper from its founding until his death in 1956. While he was editor, Ma'ariv became the most widely read newspaper in the country. He is regarded as one of the great journalists of his period.

== Views and opinions ==
Carlebach and his paper opposed the Zionist Socialist party government and its head, David Ben-Gurion. He was also a leader in the opposition to the opening of direct negotiations between Israel and Germany after the war, and the Reparations Agreement between Israel and West Germany.

In 1952 after president Chaim Weizmann's death Carlebach suggested Albert Einstein in a telegram to become Israel's president. Einstein felt honoured but refused, as he told Carlebach in a letter dated November 21, 1952, written in German.

Carlebach deprecated musical censorship as it was demanded by the Israeli government on the occasion of Jascha Heifetz's tour in Israel: "The education minister, Professor Dinur, requested that no Strauss be played. And the justice minister, Dr. Rosen, seconded that request (despite his different personal views on the identification of an artist with his art). ... And he sent that request by special messenger ... to Jascha Heifetz in Haifa a short time before the concert. Yet Jascha Heifetz received the request from two ministers of Israel, shoved it into his pocket, said whatever he said about opposing musical censorship – and refused to comply. He played Strauss in Haifa, and afterwards in Tel Aviv as well."

Carlebach was sympathetic towards conciliation between Jewish and Arab Israelis. Under his pseudonym Rav Ipkha Mistabra he published a series of essays and editorials, in Yedioth Ahronoth, Ma'ariv or in Ner, the journal of the Brit Shalom movement (Engl. lit. Covenant of Peace). By and large, however, Carlebach remained skeptic in how far an understanding with avowed representatives of Islam were possible.

Carlebach criticised, that after the verdict of Rudolf Kastner the Israeli government appealed the conviction literally overnight, unable to properly examine at all the substantial grounds for the judgment.

In 1954, Carlebach spent a three-week trip in India. "During this visit he met with Nehru and other leaders of the state and the Congress Party." His book about the trip, India: Account of a Voyage, long the only Hebrew book on India, was published in 1956 and became an instant best-seller, appearing in several editions in the years after its initial appearance.

Tommy Lapid recalls, Carlebach "shut himself up in the Dan Hotel and from there he sent us his typewritten pages, ready for the printing press. I was his very young secretary, and I watched, with thirst and surprise, the birth of the book. Carlebach was driven to write the book by a powerful inner force, in a creative endeavour that was almost compulsive. Two months later he was dead, at 48. He left a widow, a daughter, and an orphaned newspaper, and this book – a creative outburst of the greatest journalist who wrote in Hebrew."

Especially for his publications issued under the pseudonym Ipkha Mistabra, he is considered to be one of the most talented and influential authors of editorials in Hebrew journalism. The Tel Aviv street where the offices of Maariv are located was renamed after Carlebach, as is the Tel Aviv Red Line (and future Green Line) large underground light rail station located nearby.

== See also ==
- Media in Israel
