= Ephraim Carlebach =

German rabbi (1879–1936)

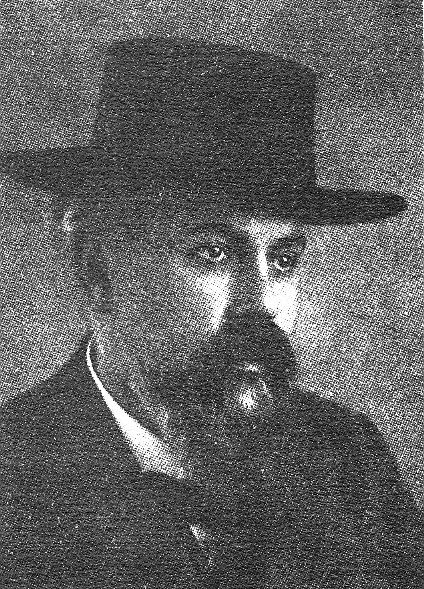
Ephraim Carlebach

Ephraim Carlebach (March 12, 1879 in Lübeck – 1936 in Ramat Gan, British Mandate of Palestine), was a German-born Orthodox rabbi.

== Biography ==
Carlebach belonged to a well-known German rabbi family. His father Salomon Carlebach (1845–1919) was rabbi in Lübeck. He had seven brothers and four sisters. He attended the Katharineum school in Lübeck, where he befriended his schoolmate Thomas Mann, as the latter recalled.

Four of his brothers were rabbis as well. They were Emanuel Carlebach (1874-1927), Joseph Carlebach (1883–1942), David Carlebach (1885–1913) and Hartwig Naftali Carlebach (1889–1967). Carlebach is most known for his work in founding Orthodox Jewish schools in Germany, notably Leipzig, from 1900. He was a leading figure in the construction of the Jewish High School and the synagogue Etz Chaim.

In 1924, he was appointed the chief Orthodox Rabbi of Leipzig. In 1935, Carlebach moved to the British Mandate of Palestine where he died in 1936. His son Esriel Carlebach was the founder and first editor of the newspaper Maariv. His nephew Shlomo Carlebach was known as "The Singing Rabbi".
