= Shlomo Carlebach =

American rabbi and musician (1925–1994)

- שלמה קרליבך
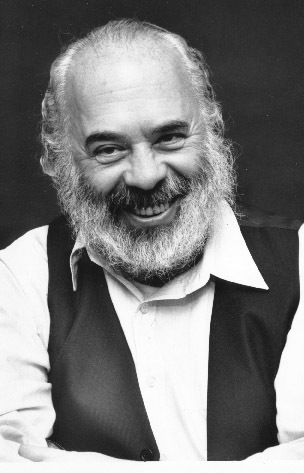
- Born: January 14, 1925; Berlin, Prussia, Weimar Germany
- Died: October 20, 1994 (aged 69); New York City, U.S.
- Resting place: Har HaMenuchot, Jerusalem, Israel; 31.7979°N 35.179°E
- Known for: Religious teacher, composer, singer, musician
- Spouse: Elaine Neila Glick
- Children: 2, including Neshama
- Father: Hartwig Naftali Carlebach
- Relatives: Eli Chaim Carlebach (twin brother)

Shlomo Carlebach (Hebrew: שלמה קרליבך; January 14, 1925 – October 20, 1994), known as Reb Shlomo to his followers, was an American rabbi and musician nicknamed "the Singing Rabbi".

Although his roots lay in traditional Orthodox yeshivot, he branched out to create his own style, combining Hasidic Judaism, warmth and personal interaction, public concerts, and song-filled synagogue services. At various times he lived in Manhattan, San Francisco, Toronto, and a moshav he founded, Mevo Modi'im, in Israel. Carlebach is the subject of Soul Doctor, a musical that debuted on Broadway in 2013. Carlebach is considered by many to be the foremost Jewish religious songwriter of the 20th century.

Carlebach was also considered a pioneer of the baal teshuva ("master of return") movement, encouraging disenchanted Jewish youth to re-embrace their heritage, using his special style of enlightened teaching, and his melodies, songs, and highly inspiring story telling. Following his death, numerous accusations of sexual abuse were levied against him, published in Lilith Magazine.

== Biography ==
Carlebach was descended from old German rabbinical dynasties. The Carlebach family is a Jewish family originally from Germany that settled in several countries. He was born in 1925 in Berlin, where his father, Hartwig Naftali Carlebach (1889–1967), was an Orthodox rabbi. He had a twin brother, Rabbi Eli Chaim Carlebach and a sister, Shulamith Levovitz. His family left Germany in 1931 and lived in Baden bei Wien, Austria and by 1933 in Switzerland.

Carlebach studied at Yeshiva Torah Vodaath and Yeshiva Rabbi Chaim Berlin in Brooklyn, New York, and Beth Medrash Gevoha in Lakewood, New Jersey. His teachers included Rabbis Shlomo Heiman and Aharon Kotler. He was considered one of Kotler's best students. During his yeshiva studies he was often asked to lead the services as a hazzan (cantor). He received semikha (rabbinic ordination) from Rabbi Yitzchak Hutner.

In 1950 Carlebach set up a small Torah learning group called T.S.G.G. (pronounced TASGIG), an acronym for "Taste And See God Is Good".

That year, Carlebach attended a Hebrew language ulpan class at the Jewish Theological Seminary (JTS), where he played hasidic melodies on the piano. Sara Schafler-Kelman heard his singing and invited Carlebach to sing chasidic tunes at the Hillel Center on Convent Avenue. Schafler prepared a poster for the event, entitled "The Place of Music in the Hassidic Tradition". This was Carlebach's first invited performance. Years later, Carlebach said to Schafler-Kelman, "You gave me a title for my life's work."

In 1951, Carlebach began learning English in a special program at Columbia University, having previously spoken mainly Yiddish. Becoming fluent in English only at the age of 26, he developed an unusual grammar, mixing Yiddish and English, that became his hallmark, and later influenced the language of his followers, as well as many other members of the neo-hassidic movement.

Carlebach became a disciple of Rabbi Yosef Yitzchok Schneersohn, the sixth rebbe of the Chabad-Lubavitch movement. From 1951 to 1954, he worked briefly as one of the first emissaries (shluchim) of Rabbi Menachem Mendel Schneerson, the seventh Lubavitcher rebbe, who urged him to use his special skills and go to college campuses to reconnect Jews to Judaism, but would later disapprove of the non-traditional tactics he used. Carlebach left the movement in 1954.

In 1972, he married Elaine Neila Glick, a teacher. They had two known daughters, Nedara (Dari) and Neshama. Neshama Carlebach is a songwriter and singer in her own right, incorporating new adaptations of her father’s melodies.

== Music career ==
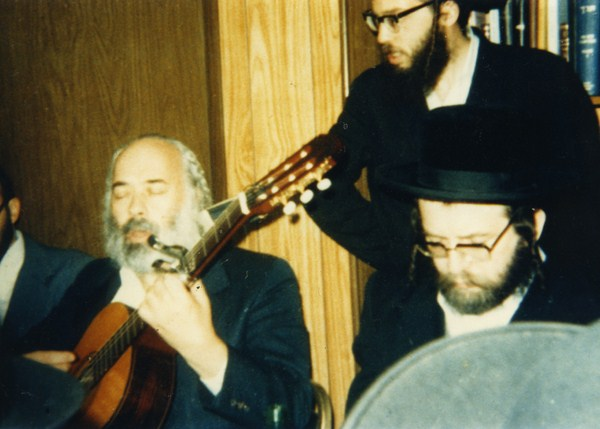
Shlomo Carlebach (left)

Carlebach began writing songs at the end of the 1950s, primarily based on verses from the Tanakh or the Siddur set to his own music. Although he composed thousands of songs, he could not read musical notes. Many of his soulful renderings of Torah verses became standards in the wider Jewish community, including Am Yisrael Chai ("[The] Nation [of] Israel Lives"—composed on behalf of the plight of Soviet Jewry in the mid-1960s), Pitchu Li ("Open [for] Me [the Gates of Righteousness]") and Borchi Nafshi ("[May] My Soul Bless [God]"). Carlebach was recording well before this and was invited to the festival by one of its organizers after she heard a recording of Carlebach.

In 1954, the Atlanta Southern Israelite reported that Carlebach was named as the technical advisor for a production of The Dybbuk. Carlebach was to advise on the music used in the theatrical production.

He became known as "The Singing Rabbi".

Some Carlebach melodies were entered in Israel's annual Hasidic Song Festival. In 1969, his song Ve'haer Eneinu, sung by the Shlosharim won third prize. The Hasidic festivals were a yearly event that helped to popularize his music. He also produced albums with a more liturgical sound. Some of the musicians he worked with during this period added a psychedelic tinge and a wider range of backup instrumentation. Carlebach now spent much of his time in Israel, living in Moshav Me'or Modi'im.

Carlebach's songs were characterized by relatively short melodies and traditional lyrics. His new tunes were easy to learn and became part of the prayer services in many synagogues around the world.

Carlebach returned to New York City, where as part of his performances he spoke of inspirational subjects rooted in Hasidism and Kabbalah. Some of his teachings have been published by his students and appear alongside his recorded songs. Carlebach spread the teachings of Peshischa, Chabad, and Breslov, and popularized the writings of, among others, the rebbe of Ishbitz, Mordechai Yosef Leiner, and rebbe Kalonymus Kalman Shapira of Piasetzno.

Carlebach became the rabbi of the Carlebach Shul on West 79th Street. He continued to perform regularly at concerts, and to record various albums of his original melodies.

On February 27, 2022, Carlebach was posthumously inducted with the inaugural class of the Jewish Music Hall of Fame.

== Death and legacy ==
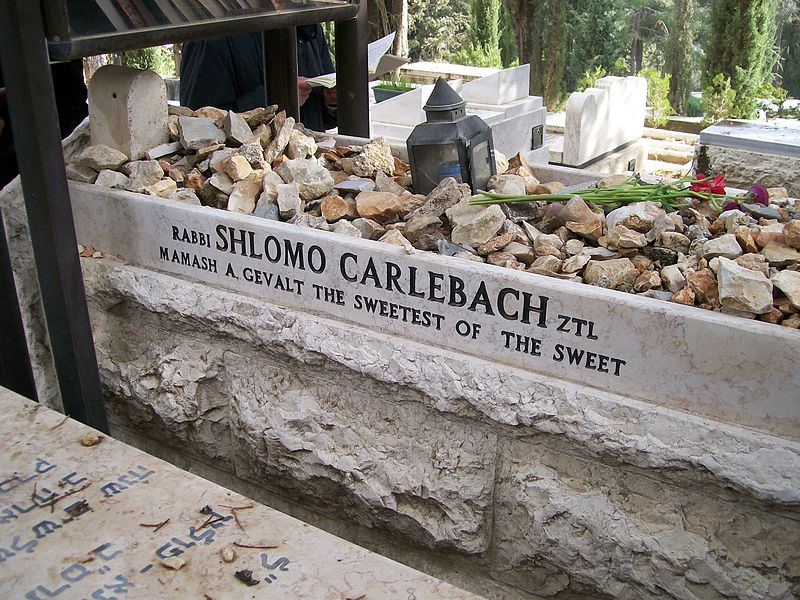
Carlebach's grave

Carlebach died of a heart attack on his way to Canada while the plane was still on the ground at LaGuardia Airport in New York. The Hebrew date was 16 Cheshvan 5755. His body was flown to Israel for burial at Har HaMenuchot. During the funeral the mourners sang Carlebach's songs, including Chasdei Hashem Ki Lo Samnu. Israel's Ashkenazi Chief Rabbi Yisrael Meir Lau gave a eulogy. An annual memorial service is held at his grave on the 16th of Cheshvan. Additional memorial events take place throughout Israel and around the world.

According to Rabbi Jonathan Rosenblatt, Carlebach "changed the expectations of the prayer experience from decorous and sombre to uplifting and ecstatic as he captivated generations with elemental melodies and stories of miraculous human saintliness, modesty and unselfishness."

Since his death, Carlebach's music has been incorporated in the services of many synagogues, some of which conduct Carlebach minyanim.

A musical written about his life, Soul Doctor, by Daniel Wise was presented off-Broadway in 2008 and New Orleans in 2010, and was received with critical acclaim. The musical had a brief off-Broadway run as a guest attraction at New York Theatre Workshop in the Summer of 2012, and earned Eric Anderson a Drama Desk Award for Outstanding Actor in a Musical nomination for his portrayal of Shlomo Carlebach. Soul Doctor opened on Broadway August 15, 2013.

A documentary film about Carlebach directed by Boaz Shahak, You Never Know, was released at the Jerusalem Film Festival in 2008.

The Torah Commentary of Rabbi Shlomo Carlebach is a series of books based on his teachings.

The Shlomo Carlebach Foundation was established to preserve and disseminate the teachings, music, and stories of Rabbi Shlomo Carlebach, and to develop communities that will share the love and joy which he radiated.

== Controversy and accusations of sexual abuse ==
Carlebach's approach towards kiruv (the popular Hebrew term for Orthodox Jewish outreach) was often tinged with controversy. Put most favorably, "He operated outside traditional Jewish structures in style and substance, and spoke about God and His love in a way that could make other rabbis uncomfortable."

After his death, Lilith magazine, a Jewish feminist publication, catalogued stories in which he was named as a sexual abuser by those who had come forward. Specifically, named accusers are quoted in this article, as well as unnamed sources and Jewish communal leaders with knowledge of the stories of harm. Even in his lifetime, Carlebach was approached about these matters. Lilith reports that people present when he was confronted say he acknowledged that he caused harm, expressed regret, and agreed that his behavior needed to change. The article indicates that most in Carlebach's circles were uncomfortable voicing their accusations at the time, leading to a widespread policy of "silence" which had, in part, enabled his continued offenses.

Since his death, many others have come forward with additional stories about how Carlebach solicited them, touched them during dancing, or on private walks. Some of the stories of harm were toward young women, teenagers in camps or youth group retreats. Some of the older people who came forward point out that they were approached by him at a time in their lives when they were particularly vulnerable, as many of them were transitioning into Jewish life and practice, and as such undergoing large changes in their lives. As their sole spiritual leader at the time, Carlebach held a lot of potential power over them. Most of his offenses were unexpected and undesired touching, or telephone calls "in the middle of the night", which his accusers describe as disturbing, but also as odd. The Lilith article says that for many, his legacy is mixed. Even many of his victims state that he still had great positive impact on their lives, despite the irreparable hurt he caused -- and that, had his problem been more public, and more help been available to him, it is possible he would have willingly sought it.

His disciples reject these accusations and say that it is unfair to accuse him after his death. However, accusations had already been made as early as the 1970s. Especially in light of the #metoo movement some have begun to question whether Jewish communities should still use his music. In January 2018 his daughter Neshama wrote an open letter to the women who were harmed by Carlebach. She wrote "I accept the fullness of who my father was, flaws and all. I am angry with him. And I refuse to see his faults as the totality of who he was."

The documentary film "The Darkest Light" (2026), directed by Simon Mendes, examines the legacy of the late Rabbi Shlomo Carlebach and the post-#MeToo reckoning surrounding decades-old allegations of sexual abuse against him. The film features interviews with surviving victims and hinges on his daughter Neshama describing her journey coming to grips with her father's legacy and behavior.

== Discography ==
Albums

- הנשמה לך Haneshama Lach (Songs of My Soul) (Zimra Records ZR-201, 1959; re-released in 2002 by Estate of Rabbi Shlomo Carlebach Restoration Edition [Sojourn Records SR-013])
- ברכי נפשי Borchi Nafshi (Sing My Heart) (Zimra Records ZR-202, 1960; re-released in 2004 by Estate of Rabbi Shlomo Carlebach Restoration Edition [Sojourn Records SR-014])). "12 Songs composed and sung by Rabbi Shlomo Carlebach, with choir and orchestra arranged and conducted by Milton Okun."
- Shlomo Carlebach Sings (Galton 1962, recorded live; later re-released as Rabbi Shlomo Carlebach Sings by the Estate of Rabbi Shlomo Carlebach Restoration Edition [Sameach Music – NDS200CD])
- פתחו לי שערי צדק (At The Village Gate) (Vanguard VRS-9116, 1963)
- מקדש מלך In The Palace of the King (Vanguard VRS-9192 (mono) VSD-79192 (stereo), 1965). "Shlomo Carlebach with chorus and symphony orchestra arranged and conducted by Benedict Silberman"
- שפכי כמים לבך Wake Up World! (Zimrani Records ZR-203, 1965). "Original Songs Composed and Sung by Rabbi Shlomo Carlebach with Chorus and Orchestra Arranged and Conducted by Milton Okun"
- "I Heard the Wall Singing" Vol. 1 (Greater Recording Co. GRC112, 1968)
- "I Heard the Wall Singing" Vol. 2 (Greater Recording Co. GRC114, 1968)
- Vehaer Eynenu (Hed Arzi, 1969)
- Shlomo Carlebach Live, Let There Be Peace (Preiser, 1973, recorded in Vienna)
- Uvnei Yerushalayim (6 Million in Heaven – 3 Million in Hell) (Menorah, 1974)
- Together with Rabbi Shlomo Carlebach (Hed Arzi, 1974)
- Rabbi Shlomo Carlebach Live in Concert (Yisrael B'tach BaShem) (Y&Y Productions, 1974, recorded in Brooklyn)
- Shlomo Carlebach & the Children of Jewish Song sing Ani Maamin (Emes Records, 1975)
- Live in Tel Aviv (Heichal HaTarbut) (Hed Arzi, 1976)
- Days Are Coming (Embassy/Hal Roach Studios, 1979; re-released by Estate of Rabbi Shlomo Carlebach Restoration Edition [Sojourn Records SR-016])
- L'Kovod Shabbos (Sound Path Records, 1980)
- Even Ma'asu HaBonim (1981)
- Nachamu Nachamu Ami [2 vol.] (Rare Productions, 1983)
- Live in Concert (Holyland, 1984, recorded in Brooklyn)
- Live in England (Menorah,1988)
- Shvochin Asader (1988)
- Live in Concert for the Jews of Russia (NCSY Toronto, 1988, recorded in Toronto)
- Shlomo Sings with the Children of Israel (Hiney Anochi V'hayeladim) (1989)
- Shlomo Carlebach at Festival Arad (1992)
- Shabbos with Shlomo (1992)
- A Melave Malka in Notting Hill (1995, recorded January 16, 1993)
- Shlomo's Greatest Stories [2 vol] (1993)
- Shuva (1994, later packaged in 2 vol. cassette set: "Sweetest Friends")
- Shabbos in Shomayim – The Last Album (1994)

Posthumous / ambiguously timed releases

- Last Shabbos in Galus (Aderet SCG300)
- Carlebach in Jerusalem (Al Eileh) (Noam, 1995)
- The Gift of Shabbos (1995, originally packaged in 2 vol. cassette set: "Sweetest Friends")
- Open Your Hearts (Music Made From The Soul, Vol. 1) (1986 Recordings)
- Holy Brothers and Sisters (Music Made From The Soul, Vol. 2) (1986 Recordings)
- HaNeshama Shel Shlomo (with Neshama Carlebach)
- Songs of Peace (Live performance, 1975)
- Live In South Africa (Live in Johannesburg, 1986) (2 CD)
- Live In Memphis (2020) (streaming)

Singles

- Am Israel Chai and Ein Kelohenou (TAV Records [French label] STE 5729/1, possibly 1967)
- "Live 10/22/74 at the Lane Sound Cube N.Y.C." (Zimrani Records Z-10-11, 1974): Uva'uh haovdim and Mimkomcho

Compilations

- The Essential Shlomo Carlebach (Vanguard VSD 733/34, 1978: At the Village Gate & In The Palace of the King complete)
- The Best of Shlomo Carlibach (Hed Arzi 1973, 14 songs on Cassette 1988, 2 CD)
- להיטי זהב Shlomo Carlebach Greatest Hits (Unplugged) (3CD, CDH 597, 1999 "For sale out of North America Only")

Appears on

- Rebuild Thy House (B'nai Bescho) (Elana Records ER-101, 1967). Ten songs composed by Rabbi Eliyahu Hartman, five sung each by Carlebach and Cantor Sholom Katz.
- Tanchumim (TG-201, 1975). Songs composed by Tanchum Portnoy, Carlebach sings "Sh'ma Kolenu" & "Yimloch".
- Harmony – Songs of Cecelia Margules (Cecelia Productions, 1990). A compilation of songs by composer Cecelia Margules. Carlebach sings "Mira", "Ani Ma'amin", & "Mi Chamocha".

== Filmography ==
Film
Year	Title	Role	Notes
2008	You Never Know	Himself	Documentary
2026	The Darkest Light	Himself	Documentary

== Books ==
- Holy Beggars: A Journey from Haight Street to Jerusalem, Aryae Coopersmith, 2011, One World Light, CA
- Rabbi Shlomo Carlebach: Life, Mission, and Legacy, Natan Ophir (Offenbacher), 2014, Urim, Jerusalem
- The Book of Love and Prayer: Rabbi Shlomo Carlebach Book Collection, Zivi Ritchie, 2019
- Holy Brother: Inspiring Stories and Enchanted Tales about Rabbi Shlomo Carlebach, Yitta Halberstam Mandelbaum, 2002, Rowman & Littlefield, MA
- Lamed Vav: A Collection of the Favorite Stories of Rabbi Shlomo Carlebach, Shlomo Carlebach (Author), Tzlotana Barbara Midlo (Compiler), 2005
- The Torah Commentary of Rabbi Shlomo Carlebach: Exodus, Rabbi Shlomo Carlebach (Author), Rabbi Shlomo Katz (Editor) 2020, Urim Publications
- The Shlomo Carlebach Songbook, Milt Okun (Editor) 1970, Zimrani Records Inc.

== See also ==
- Ephraim Carlebach
- Carlebach movement
- Nigun
