= Mickey au Camp de Gurs =

1942 French comic book by Horst Rosenthal

Mickey au Camp de Gurs (Mickey Mouse in the Gurs Internment Camp)
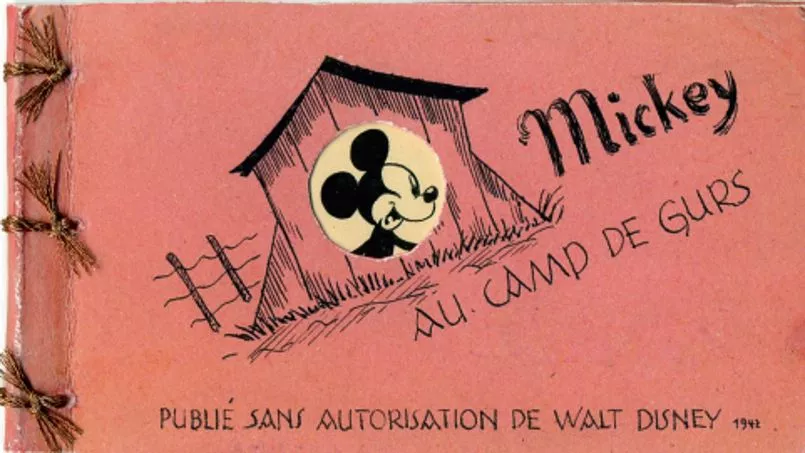
- Cover of Mickey au Camp de Gurs
- Creator: Horst Rosenthal
- Date: 1942
- Main characters: Mickey Mouse
- Page count: 15 pages

Original publication
- Published in: Mickey à Gurs: Les Carnets de dessin de Horst Rosenthal (Mickey in Gurs: The comic books of Horst Rosenthal)
- Date of publication: 2014
- Language: French
- ISBN: 978-27021-438-5-8

Mickey au Camp de Gurs (Mickey Mouse in the Gurs Internment Camp) is a 1942 French comic booklet by German-born French cartoonist of Jewish descent Horst Rosenthal. It was created while Rosenthal was a prisoner at the Gurs internment camp in France during World War II. The comic features Walt Disney's Mickey Mouse, who is arrested on suspicion of being Jewish and is sent to Gurs. Rosenthal acknowledged the source of his protagonist by adding "publié sans autorisation de Walt Disney" ("Published without Walt Disney's Permission") to the front cover. Rosenthal was detained in Gurs for two years before being sent to Auschwitz in September 1942; he was murdered on the day of his arrival.

Mickey au Camp de Gurs was first published in 2014 in Paris by Calmann-Lévy and the Mémorial de la Shoah, 72 years after it was written. Mickey au Camp de Gurs has been called "one of the earliest surviving examples of a comic from the Holocaust", and "perhaps the earliest sequential art narrative dealing with the Holocaust".

== Synopsis ==
Mickey au Camp de Gurs features, and is narrated by, Mickey Mouse of Walt Disney fame. Mickey is arrested in France by the Vichy gendarmerie for being unable to produce identity papers. He tells the judge he has no mother and that his father is Walt Disney. When asked if he is Jewish, Mickey replies that he has no idea about that. The judge concludes that Mickey must be Jewish, and he is sent to the Gurs internment camp. There he observes the camp's harsh living conditions with its oppressive rules. He needs a magnifying glass to see his food ration and meets several inmates who appear to be in collusion with the authorities. Mickey finally decides that this is not for him and, since he is a cartoon character, he erases himself from the camp and redraws himself walking to America:

And so, because I'm nothing more than a drawing, I rubbed myself out with a stroke of the eraser… and… ta-da…!!! The police can always come and look for me in the land of lib...ty, eq...ity and frat...ity (I'm talking about America!).

— Last panel, Mickey au Camp de Gurs. (Note: Translated from the French by Alister Wedderburn; the ellipses are present in Rosenthal's original text. "[...] au pays de la L·····é, de l'E······é et de la F·····é.")

== Artwork and publication history ==
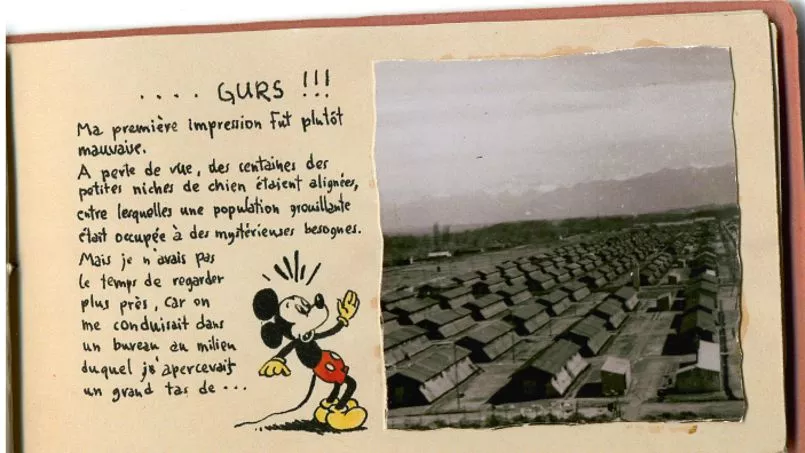
Panel 4 of Mickey au Camp de Gurs; in addition to the text and drawing, a photograph of camp Gurs was pasted onto the page.

Mickey au Camp de Gurs is a 15-page, 13-panel comic strip written and illustrated by Rosenthal. He created it using black ink and watercolour on A5 paper. All the text is handwritten and the illustrations are black-and-white on some pages, and coloured on others. Hillary L. Chute suggested in her book, Disaster Drawn (2016) that the absence of colour in Rosenthal's work may have been due to the availability of materials at the time.

The fourth panel (pictured) includes a photograph of the Gurs internment camp showing dozens of barracks in rows. It was pasted onto the comic book page alongside the text and a drawing of a startled Mickey staring at his first glimpse of the camp.

In 1978 Mickey au Camp de Gurs was donated to the Centre de Documentation Juive Contemporaine (Center of Contemporary Jewish Documentation) in Paris by the Hansbacher family. How they acquired the book is not known. It reached a wider audience in 2011 when Art Spiegelman, creator of the 1991 graphic novel Maus, which also depicts Jews as mice, mentioned it in his book, MetaMaus. Spiegelman wrote that his discovery of Rosenthal's comic was "another validation that I'd stumbled onto a way of telling that had deep roots".

Mickey au Camp de Gurs was first published in 2014, along with two of Rosenthal's other comic books he had created while interred in Gurs, by Calmann-Lévy and the Mémorial de la Shoah in Paris. The collection, entitled Mickey à Gurs: Les Carnets de dessin de Horst Rosenthal (Mickey in Gurs: The comic books of Horst Rosenthal), was compiled and edited by Belgian political scientist and historian Joël Kotek, and French journalist and curator Didier Pasamonik.

== Critical analysis ==
Glyn Morgan described Mickey au Camp de Gurs as a blend of Walt Disney and Hergé that deploys "critique and darkly-comic parody". Kjell Knudde characterised the comic as "a strange clash between childish innocence and the harsh reality of Nazi politics and war". Bernard Marx called Rosenthal's work "an offbeat and very moving testimony of the horror lived". Morgan said Mickey Mouse is both an American outsider and a Jewish inmate, making him a "metatextual being" able to transcend the reality of the situation and give Rosenthal an otherwise unobtainable point of view. Morgan called the last page of the comic "[m]etafictional fantastika", and drew parallels between Mickey erasing himself and the Nazis erasing the Jews.

Pnina Rosenberg wrote that the cover of Rosenthal's comic showing a smiling Mickey Mouse in a concentration camp creates an incongruity that grows as the story progresses. The dissonance culminates when Mickey decides to escape his "absurd, Kafkaesque" predicament, and erases himself to flee to the land of "liberty, equality and fraternity", but he makes it clear it is America he is going to, not France, which has abandoned its national motto, liberté, égalité, fraternité, turned its back on human rights and become anti-semitic.

Alister Wedderburn suggested that by portraying a concentration camp in a comic, Rosenthal suspends reality and creates a "parallel camp space" which his cartoon character can investigate and question "with a latitude that would be impossible within the material camp itself". Wedderburn explained that Mickey explores Gurs with "childlike naïveté". He is unable to understand the purpose of the camp and its rules of conduct, and is puzzled rather than shocked by it. Rosenberg said Rosenthal uses Disney's mouse to convey the "surrealistic situation" the camp's inmates found themselves in, and "sharply criticizes" the French government for forsaking them. Marx remarked that by making the protagonist a cartoon character, Rosenthal emphasises the absurdity of their situation.

Comparisons have been made between Rosenthal's Mickey au Camp de Gurs and Spiegelman's Maus. Chute called Mickey in Gurs "a haunting precursor to Maus", and stated that both works were instrumental in shaping the development of contemporary comics. Lisa Naomi Mulman wrote that "the remarkable power" of the two books is in the graphics, which "integrates textual and illustrative materials, producing profoundly ironic and telling juxtapositions", but she remarked that the most notable similarity is the depiction of the Jew as a mouse. Robert G. Weiner and Lynne Fallwell noted that Rosenthal's use of Mickey Mouse "illustrates how Jews are made into 'the other'—something that is subhuman". Richard Meran Barsam stated that in the 1940 Nazi propaganda film The Eternal Jew, "Jews are equated to rats", and Hitler, who claimed that "[t]he Jews are undoubtedly a race, but they are not human", called mice a malignant species. Mulman opined that by depicting Jews as mice, Rosenthal and Spiegelman "metaphorically engage[d] Hitler's malevolent racial allegations".

Stephen Feinstein wrote that Rosenthal's statement "Published without Walt Disney's Permission" on the front cover of Mickey au Camp de Gurs illustrated the author's concern about infringing copyright. Feinstein suggested that Rosenthal's unofficial comic highlighted the irony that "the legal protection afforded copyright something stronger, even in the present eras, than protection of people". Knudde noted that the comic's optimistic ending suggested that Rosenthal believed that he too would be set free, and was oblivious of what the Nazis had planned for him and the other detainees. Knudde said that Rosenthal's fate "casts a wry and dark shadow over his writings". Wedderburn emphasised the "obvious overtone" and "pathos" that clouds the comic: while Mickey can escape his cartoon world, his author remains captive in the material world.

== See also ==
- Anthropomorphism
- Mickey Mouse in Vietnam
