= Horst Rosenthal =

German-Jewish cartoonist (1915–1942)

- Born: Horst Sigmund Rosenthal; 10 August 1915 Breslau, German Empire
- Died: 11 September 1942 (aged 27) Auschwitz-Birkenau, German-occupied Poland
- Areas: Cartoonist, Writer, Inker, Colourist
- Notable works: Mickey au Camp de Gurs

Horst Sigmund Rosenthal (10 August 1915 – 11 September 1942) was a German-born cartoonist of Jewish descent. (Note: Some sources incorrectly refer to Rosenthal as Polish-born. He was German-born as his birthplace of Breslau was part of the German Empire at the time. Breslau was only incorporated into Poland after World War II, and its name changed to Wrocław.) He is best known for his 1942 French comic book Mickey au Camp de Gurs (Mickey Mouse in the Gurs Internment Camp) which he created while he was a prisoner at the Gurs internment camp in France during World War II. He was later transferred to the Auschwitz concentration camp in German-occupied Poland, where he was murdered on arrival.

Rosenthal also created two other French comic books while incarcerated in Gurs, La Journée d'un Hébergé (A Day in the Life of a Camp Resident) and Petit Guide à travers le Camp de Gurs (Little Guide Through the Gurs Camp). The three books were first published in October 2014 by Calmann-Lévy and the Mémorial de la Shoah in Paris, 72 years after they were written.

== Biography ==
Rosenthal was born to Jewish parents in 1915 in Breslau in what was then the German Empire. (Note: After World War II, Breslau was incorporated into Poland and its name changed to Wrocław.) With the rise of antisemitism in Germany in the early 1930s, he fled to France on 3 July 1933 after having obtained a visa to stay in Paris for two months. Rosenthal applied for political asylum in November 1933, but it was not until December 1936 that he received it. He worked as a draftsman in Paris until the outbreak of the Second World War. When Hitler invaded France in June 1940, Rosenthal was arrested because of his Jewish ancestry and spent time in four French concentration camps. On 28 October 1940 he was sent to the Gurs internment camp in Pyrénées-Atlantiques in Vichy France. A number of artists, including German-Jewish artist Charlotte Salomon, had also been incarcerated at Gurs.

Camp Gurs was a refugee camp in south west France near the Spanish border, built in 1939 to accommodate refugees fleeing the Spanish Civil War. In 1940 an armistice between Germany and the Vichy government resulted in the conversion of Gurs to a concentration camp to house Jews and other "undesirables". Living conditions at Gurs were difficult, but the detainees did their best to make life tolerable by engaging in artistic activities when they were able. They held concerts, staged plays and exhibited art created by inmates. Rosenthal, and others, often used humour in their work to cope with the brutal conditions of camp life.

In August 1942, after almost two years at Gurs, Rosenthal was moved to two other camps in France before being transferred to the Auschwitz concentration camp in German-occupied Poland on 11 September 1942. Rosenthal was murdered on the day of his arrival at Auschwitz. He was 27 years old.

=== Comic books ===
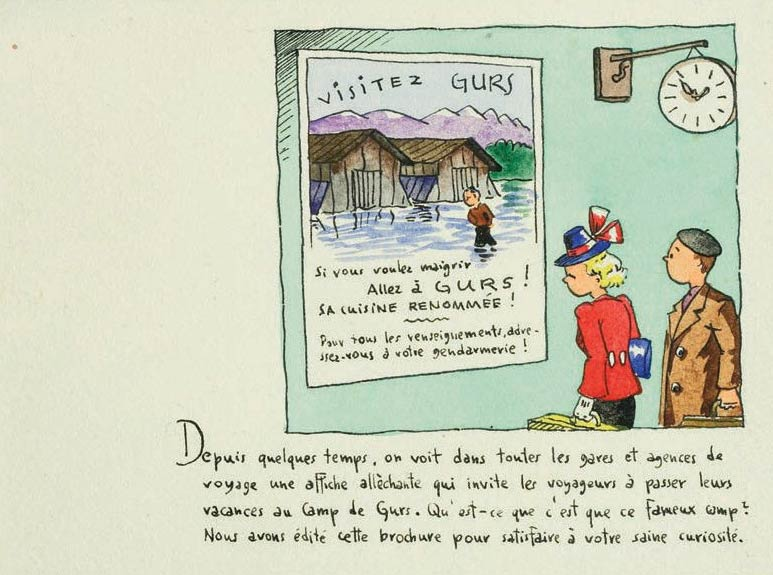
Petit guide de visitez Gurs

While at Gurs, Rosenthal created three short comic books in French, Mickey au Camp de Gurs (Mickey Mouse in the Gurs Internment Camp), La Journée d'un Hébergé (A Day in the Life of a Camp Resident), and Petit Guide à travers le Camp de Gurs (Little Guide Through the Gurs Camp). He used ink and watercolour on A5 paper to write and illustrate the books.

Mickey au Camp de Gurs is a 13-panel comic strip starring Walt Disney's Mickey Mouse, who is arrested on suspicion of being Jewish and sent to Gurs. La Journée d'un Hébergé is 18 pages long and describes a typical day in the camp, including the forced marches, interrogations, substandard food, and romance with a female inmate. Petit Guide à travers le Camp de Gurs is a 13-page tongue-in-cheek guide to the camp facilities and its daily events.

=== Legacy ===
While Rosenthal did not survive the war, his three comic books did. In 1978 Mickey au Camp de Gurs and La Journée d'un Hébergé were donated to the Centre de Documentation Juive Contemporaine (Center of Contemporary Jewish Documentation) in Paris by the Ansbacher family. Leo Ansbacher and his brother Max had both been interned in Gurs at the same time as Horst Rosenthal, where at least Leo Ansbacher also organised relief activities for other internees. Before Rosenthal was transferred, Ansbacher presumably came into possession of the two comics. In 1986, Elsbeth Kasser, a Swiss nurse who voluntarily lived in camp Gurs to assist the detainees, donated Petit Guide à travers le Camp de Gurs, and other works created by inmates, to the Skovgaard Museum in Viborg, Denmark. (Note: Some sources state that all three comics were donated to the Centre de Documentation Juive Contemporaine by Rabbi Max Ansbacher, who had worked as a chaplain at Gurs.)

Rosenthal's three books were first published in October 2014 by Calmann-Lévy and the Mémorial de la Shoah in Paris in a collection entitled, Mickey à Gurs: Les Carnets de dessin de Horst Rosenthal (Mickey in Gurs: The comic books of Horst Rosenthal). The collection was compiled and edited by Belgian political scientist and historian Joël Kotek and French journalist and curator Didier Pasamonik. In addition to the three books, the collection also includes a biography of Rosenthal and a description and analysis of the comics.

== Works ==
These are the only comics books Rosenthal was known to have written. They were all created in 1942 in the Gurs internment camp.

- Mickey au Camp de Gurs (Mickey Mouse in the Gurs Internment Camp)
- La Journée d'un Hébergé (A Day in the Life of a Camp Resident)
- Petit Guide à travers le Camp de Gurs (Little Guide Through the Gurs Camp)

== Published collections ==
- Mickey à Gurs: Les Carnets de dessin de Horst Rosenthal (Mickey in Gurs: The comic books of Horst Rosenthal), edited by Joël Kotek and Didier Pasamonik (October 2014, Calmann-Lévy and the Mémorial de la Shoah, Paris, ISBN 978-27021-438-5-8) – contains Rosenthal's three comic books, plus a biography of the author and commentary on the books
