= Messola Pogorelsky =

Russian physician and writer

- Мессель Викентьевич Погорельский
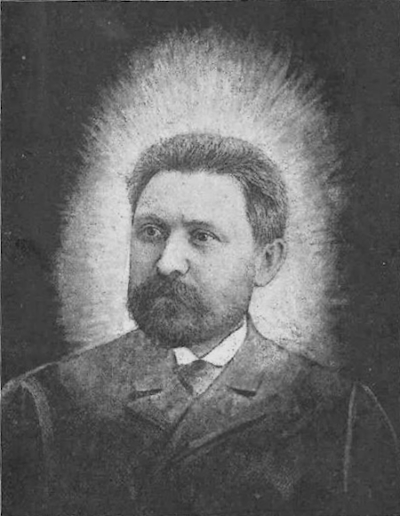
- Born: 7 March 1862; Bobruisk, Minsk Governorate, Russian Empire
- Education: University of St. Vladimir
- Occupations: Physician; writer
- Writing career
- Language: Russian, German

Messola Pogorelsky (Russian: Мессель Викентьевич Погорельский, romanized: Messel' Vikent'yevich Pogorel'skiy; born 7 March 1862) was a Russian physician and writer.

Pogorelsky was born to a Jewish family in Bobruisk, and educated at the gymnasium of his native town. He completed his medical degree at the University of Saint Vladimir in Kiev in 1890. In the same year he was appointed crown rabbi of Kherson, a position which he held until 1893. He was a prolific writer on medical and on Jewish subjects. His medical essays appeared in the St. Petersburger Medicinische Wochenschrift, the Russkaya Meditzina, and other Russian periodicals.

== Selected bibliography ==
- Circumcisio Ritualis Hebræorum. Di rituelle Beschneidungsceremonie der Israeliten [The ritual circumcision ceremony of the Israelites] (in German). St. Petersburg. 1888.
- Охотничий порох и шелуха лука, как ecbolica [Hunting powder and onion husk as ecbolica]. St. Petersburg. 1889.
- Случай излечения полного истерического паралича всех конечностей, мышц туловища и мочевого пузыря посредством гипнотизма [A case of curing total hysterical paralysis of all limbs, trunk muscles and bladder through hypnotism]. St. Petersburg. 1889.
- Наблюдения во время оспенной эпидемии, бывшей в Елисаветграде зимой 1887-88 года (Докл. Общ. елис. вр., чит. в засед. 2 апр. 88 г) [Observations during the smallpox epidemic in Yelisavetgrad in the winter of 1887–88]. St. Petersburg: P. I. Schmidt. 1889.
- Еврейские имена собственные: Имена библейские, Нового завета и талмудич [Jewish names in Bible and Talmud]. St. Petersburg. 1893.
- Электрофотосфены и энергография как доказательство существования физиологической полярной энергии, или так называемого животного магнетизма, и их значения для медицины и естествознания [Electrophotosphenes and energography as proof of physiological polar energy or the so-called animal magnetism]. St. Petersburg: V. V. Demakova. 1899.
- О сифилисе по Библии: Zaraʿath, или Что такое библейская „Проказа“? [On syphilis according to the Bible]. St. Petersburg: E. Arnold. 1900.
- Обрезание: Происхождение, польза и производство этой операции [Circumcision: The origin, benefits and production of the operation] (3rd ed.). St. Petersburg: E. Arnold. 1901.
