= Isaac Schneersohn =

French rabbi and industrialist

- Born: 1879 or 1881; Kamianets-Podilskyi, Ukraine
- Died: June 25, 1969 (age 88 or 90); Paris
- Occupations: Founder, CDJC; Director, CDJC
- Organization: Center of Contemporary Jewish Documentation

Isaac Schneersohn (1879 or 1881 – 1969) was a French rabbi, industrialist, and the founder of the first Holocaust Archives and Memorial. He emigrated from Ukraine to France after the First World War.

In 1943 while under Italian wartime occupation, Schneersohn founded a documentation center at his home in Grenoble with representatives from 40 Jewish organizations. The center moved to Paris at Liberation and became the Center of Contemporary Jewish Documentation. Schneersohn remained President of the CDJC and editor of its Revue until his death in 1969.

== Biography ==
=== Early life ===
Isaac Schneersohn was born in Kamenetz-Podolsk, currently in Ukraine, in 1879 or 1881.

Schneersohn served as a crown rabbi in Horodnia and Chernihiv in northern Ukraine. He was active both socially and politically, becoming involved in community affairs and education, as well as becoming a council member and deputy mayor in Ryazan as a member of the moderate liberal party.

=== Emigration to France ===
Originally from the Russian Empire, Isaac Schneersohn emigrated to France in 1920 after the Bolshevik revolution. He was naturalized as a French citizen during the inter-wars years.

In Paris, "His home became a place where Jewish leaders met, many of them Zionists, mostly right-wing Revisionists, as he had become."

=== Family ===
Schneersohn had a brother, Dr. Fishel Schneerson and three sons: Boris, Arnold, and Michel, who were mobilized as reserve officers in the French Army. Boris and Arnold were captured and interned at the disciplinary camp at Lübeck. Michel was liberated in August 1940. He then took part in the fight as a member of the Dordogne Maquis.

=== Career ===
A descendant of a long line of rabbis and a rabbi by training, Schneersohn decided to go into industry. Schneersohn was Director Delegate of the Société Anonyme de Travaux Métalliques in Paris.

He founded the documentation center CDJC in 1943 while in Grenoble, moved it to Paris, and remained director until his death. See section Center of Contemporary Jewish Documentation below.

=== World War II ===
When World War II broke out, he left Paris for Bordeaux, with his family. In 1941, he settled in Mussidan (Note: Michel Schneersohn was the mayor of that city from 1946 to 1947.) in the Dordogne.

He was active in the Union générale des israélites de France (UGIF, General Organization of Jews in France). As such, he made numerous trips to Grenoble, where in 1942 the idea grew to create a "Center of Jewish Documentation" (Centre de documentation juive), which later became the Center of Contemporary Jewish Documentation.

The work of the CDJC was interrupted by the German invasion of the Italian zone in September 1943. The members of the CDJC took refuge in the underground. Isaac Schneersohn and Léon Poliakov got back to Paris at the time of the insurrection of August 1944. They succeeded to seize the archives of the Commissariat-General for Jewish Affairs of the archives of the German Embassy in Paris, of the staff headquarters, and especially of the Anti-Jewish department of the Gestapo.

=== Death ===
Schneersohn died in Paris on June 25, 1969 at the age of 88 or 90.

On January 27, 2005, the occasion of the 60th anniversary commemoration of the liberation of the Auschwitz concentration camp, Schneersohn was remembered by Éric de Rothschild, President of the Mémorial de la Shoah, by the Mayor of Paris, Bertrand Delanoë, and by President of the French Republic, Jacques Chirac. Chirac said that "Isaac Schneersohn was the archivist of the spirit against the bureaucracy of barbarism."

== Center of Contemporary Jewish Documentation ==
=== CDJC ===
In 1946, Schneersohn became President of the Center of Contemporary Jewish Documentation (CDJC) and editor of the Revue published by the center, until 1969.

On October 8, 1958, the future Nobel Peace Prize laureate René Cassin presented him with the Cross of the Knight of the Legion of Honor.

His son Arnold became honorary treasurer of the Center after the war. When captive in the Oflag, he had organized a pocket of resistance, which earned him a transfer to the discipline Oflag of Lübeck.

In Paris, he was close to Rabbi David Feuerwerker, who took part in the annual ceremonies at the CDJC on numerous occasions in the presence of the authorities. When Rabbi Feuerwerker became the rabbi of a synagogue in the 15th arrondissement of Paris, Schneersohn and his son Arnold were members of his community.

Schneersohn was synonymous with the CDJC. He personified the institution, which continues to have an important influence worldwide.

=== The founding meeting in Grenoble ===
Schneersohn hosted a meeting April 28, 1943, at his residence in Grenoble which was then under Italian occupation to create a Jewish "documentation center" to collect documents and testimony on the situation of Jews during the war. He invited forty delegates of Jewish organizations including Jacob Gordin (Note: Gordin worked part-time at the library of the Alliance Israélite Universelle and also with Schneersohn to create the CDJC. Kuperminc, Jean-Claude (2001). "La reconstruction de la bibliothèque de l'Alliance israélite universelle, 1945-1955". Archives Juives (in French). 34 (34). Les belles lettres: 98–113. doi:10.3917/aj.341.0098.) (Note: According to lamaisondesevres.org,Jacoubovitch, J. (February 15, 2013). "Document : Rue Amelot". lamasondesevres.org (in French). Translated by Jacoubovitch-Bouhana, Gabrielle. Archived from the original on 19 January 2022.) to the founding meeting.

Without knowing whether he or any of them would even survive the war, Schneersohn was motivated by a desire to accumulate and preserve materials and to write about everything that was happening, as building blocks for historians who would come later.

The documentation center was organized with a seven-member management committee consisting of two representatives of the Consistory (Consistory (Judaism)) (Consistoire central), two representatives of the Fédération des sociétés juives de France, one from the World ORT, and one from the rabbinate, with Schneersohn presiding.

=== Foundation of the CDJC ===
To accumulate testimonies on the Shoah, Schneersohn together with Léon Poliakov (Note: Poliakov knew Schneersohn from before the war. See his testimony of April 28, 1997.) (Note: Poliakov was temporarily the secretary of Chief Rabbi Schneour Zalman Schneersohn, Schneersohn's cousin, during the war.) devoted himself to collect documents which served the history of the Jews during the war. The group organized around Schneersohn and Poliakov returned to Paris, during the Liberation of Paris of August 1944, taking possession of the archives of the Commissariat-General for Jewish Affairs of the Vichy Regime, of those of the German Embassy in Paris, of the German staff headquarters, and of the Anti-Jewish archives of the Gestapo in Paris. (Note: Poliakov discovered the Gestapo archives.) (Note: In his testimony of April 28, 1997, Poliakov declared that he was the crux of the CDJC, "without doubt", since without him, there would have been no documents.)

=== Related institutions ===
In 1944, the CDJC was thus transferred to Paris. It settled in Le Marais, practically in the Pletzl, the old Jewish neighborhood, an evident symbolism.

The Mémorial du martyr juif inconnu was inaugurated on October 30, 1956.

In 1997, the decision was taken to merge the two institutions: the CDJC and the Mémorial du martyr juif inconnu, to form the Mémorial de la Shoah, which opened on January 27, 2005.

== Publications ==
- Schneersohn, Isaac; Wellers, Georges (1946). De Drancy à Auschwitz [From Drancy to Auschwitz] (in French). Paris: Éditions du Centre. OCLC 458932152.
- — (1947). Activités des organisations juives en France sous l'occupation [Activities of Jewish Organizations in France under the Occupation] (in French). Paris: Éditions du Centre. OCLC 313311271.
- —; Poliakov, Léon; Godart, J. (1949). L'étoile jaune [The Yellow Star] (in French). Paris: Éditions du Centre de documentation juive contemporaine. OCLC 459556534.
- —; Monneray, Henri; Cassin, Réne; Taylor, Telford (1949). La persécution des juifs dans les pays de l'Est présentée à Nuremberg : recueil de documents [Persecution of Jews in the East as exhibited at Nuremberg: Collection of Documents] (in French). Paris: Éditions du Centre. OCLC 490644866.
- —; Poliakov, Léon; Hosiasson, P.; Godart, J. (1955). Jews under the Italian occupation. Paris: Ed́itions du Centre. OCLC 0535438.
- —; Cassin, René; Machover, J. M. (1957). Dix ans après la chute de Hitler (1945-1955) [Ten Years After the Fall of Hitler] (in French). Paris: Éditions du Centre de documentation juive contemporaine. OCLC 461240459.
- — (1966). Le Seder des 32 otages : l'histoire des otages en Russie pendant la première guerre mondiale et la lutte pour leur libération (in French). Paris: Centre de Documentation Juive Contemporaine. OCLC 13909240.
- — (1968). D'Auschwitz à Israel : 20 ans après libération [From Auschwitz to Israel, twenty years since liberation] (in French). Paris. OCLC 313379406.
- — (1968). D'Auschwitz à Israël, vingt ans après la Libération [From Auschwitz to Israel, twenty years since liberation] (in French). Paris: C.D.J.C. OCLC 1949208.
- — (1968). Lebn un kamf fun jidn in tzarišn Rusland, 1905-1917 [Life and Struggle of Jews in Tsarist Russia] (in Yiddish). OCLC 164671895.

== See also ==
- Center of Contemporary Jewish Documentation
- The Holocaust in France
- The Holocaust

== Sources ==
- Kaspi, André (1991). Les Juifs pendant l'Occupation [The Jews during the Occupation] (in French). Paris: Éditions du Seuil. ISBN 978-2-02-013509-2.
- Rabinowicz, Tzvi M., ed. (1996). Encyclopedia Of Hassidism. Northvale, New Jersey, London: Jason Aronson. ISBN 978-1-56821-123-7.
- Wyman, David S.; Rosenzveig, Charles H. (1996). The world reacts to the Holocaust. p. 21.
- Rosenfeld, Alvin Hirsch (1997). Thinking about the Holocaust after half a century. Indiana University Press. p. 281. ISBN 978-0-253-33331-5.
- Michel-Gasse (1999). Dictionnaire-guide de généalogie (in French). Éditions Jean-Paul Gisserot. ISBN 978-2-87747-413-9.
- Brayard, Florent (2000). Le génocide des juifs: entre procès et histoire, 1943-2000 [The Jewish genicide: between trial and history] (in French). Berlin: Centre Marc Bloch (Éditions Complexe). p. 116. ISBN 978-2-87027-857-4.
- Benbassa, Esther; DeBevoise, M. B. (2001). The Jews of France: A History from Antiquity to the Present. Princeton University Press. ISBN 978-0-691-09014-6.
- Jackson, Julian (2003). France: The Dark Years, 1940-1944. Oxford University Press. p. 14. ISBN 978-0-19-925457-6.
- Boursier, Jean-Yves (2005). Musées de guerre et mémoriaux : politiques de la mémoire [Thoughts and memories on the war: political diaries] (in French). Éditions MSH. p. 53. ISBN 978-2-7351-1079-7.
- Wieviorka, Annette (2006). The era of the witness. Translated by Jared Stark. Ithaca: Cornell University Press. p. 50.
  - L'ère du témoin (in French) (1st ed.). Paris: Plon. 1998., original French edition
  - L'Ère du témoin (in French) (2nd ed.). Paris: Hachette, "Pluriel". 2002. ISBN 978-2-01-279046-9., second French edition
- Afoumado, Diane (2006). 1946-2006: 60 ans dans l'histoire d'une revue [Sixty years in a journal's history] (PDF) (in French). Paris: Memorial de la Shoah. Archived from the original (PDF) on October 19, 2007.
- Ruderman, David B.; Feiner, Shmuel (2007). Schwerpunkt: Early Modern Culture and Haskala. Vandenhoeck & Ruprecht. p. 448. ISBN 978-3-525-36933-3.
- Heilman, Samuel C.; Friedman, Menachem M. (2010). The Rebbe. The Life and Afterlife of Menachem Mendel Schneerson. Princeton and Oxford: Princeton University Press. ISBN 978-0-691-13888-6.
