= Crown rabbi (Russia) =

Crown rabbi (Russian: казённый раввин, IPA: [kɐˈzʲɵnːɨj rɐˈvʲːin], lit. 'official rabbi') was a position in the Russian Empire given to a member of a Jewish community appointed to act as an intermediary between his community and the Imperial government, to perform certain civil duties such as registering births, marriages, and divorces. Because their main job qualification was fluency in Russian, crown rabbis were typically considered agents of the state by members of their own communities, not true rabbis, and they often had no education in or knowledge of Jewish law.

== History ==
The origins of the crown rabbinate in Imperial Russia date to the early 19th century and administrative requirements by the tsar that the Jewish community maintain and provide civil records to the Imperial government in the Russian language.

=== Religion as agent of the state ===
The Russian government viewed all permissible religions as agents of the state. Russian Orthodox priests, Mennonite ministers, Catholics as well as Jewish rabbis–were all required to perform certain civil duties such as registering births, deaths, and marriages, as well as other duties. The Russians found this arrangement useful, and employed designated members of these religious communities at a tiny salary (which could be augmented by bribes by the ambitious) to perform these official functions.

=== Language requirements under Alexander I ===
Ukases by Tsar Alexander I (reigned 1801–1825) required the rabbis to maintain civil information in Russian as well as Hebrew. Rabbis in the Empire all knew Hebrew and - among Ashkenazi Jewish communities - Yiddish, but few could speak Russian or other languages considered useful by the Empire such as German and Polish. For this reason, the Jewish communities chose an individual familiar with Russian and other required languages to perform this role, and put his name forward. If approved by the governmental administration, they became "official" rabbis, in the sense that they acted as the intermediary between their community and the Imperial government for the required civil and other administrative duties the government required of them.

Since rabbis most often did not speak Russian, the men put forth by the community typically were men who were not rabbis, and often they were not even particularly familiar with Jewish law. Because of this, they were looked down upon by their communities as agents or puppets of the government, and not real rabbis, despite the title accorded them by the state.

=== Evolution under Nicholas I ===
This new position became more formalized under Tsar Nicholas I (reigned 1825–1855). In 1835, new laws established these appointees as employees and officials of the Imperial government. While continuing their record-keeping duties as before, they were also now given religious authority by the state and were also to maintain loyalty to the state among their community. It was under these new regulations that those occupying these official posts came to be called "crown rabbis".

=== Choosing a crown rabbi ===
A crown rabbi was either appointed, or elected by members of the Jewish community in which he resided. In Kiev, shortly after Jewish residents were permitted to settle in the city in 1861, a crown rabbi was appointed. But the local community objected, and wished to elect someone with the education and stature that they could respect, and elected their own man, Evsei Tsukkerman, instead. He was then approved by the government, and took up the position of crown rabbi.

=== State seminaries ===
The crown rabbinate evolved, and by mid-century the government opened its own seminaries for training rabbis (supported by taxes on Jewish communities) with a strong secular syllabus promoting the interests of the state. The training was seven years undergraduate, followed by three years training in pedagogy or rabbinical studies. Secular subjects were mandatory; the syllabus did include Rabbinic training (Talmud, halakha) at the graduate level, but was optional and few graduates took it.

The first graduates emerged in the 1850s, and by the following decade, new laws were passed obliging the Jewish communities to hire these graduates, although there was a lot of resistance to them as they were viewed as poorly or uneducated in Jewish matters important to the community, and a bad influence because of their years of secular indoctrination. Few graduates found positions, and the number of them graduating went down to a trickle. Finally, the government closed the schools down in 1873, realizing that the Jewish community regarded them as unfit for the honored position of rabbi. The position of crown rabbi outlasted the schools, and while the government viewed the crown rabbis as being the only official rabbis, the communities continued to have rabbis schooled in the traditional ways, with the result that many communities had two rabbis, an "official" one for dealing with the Tsar, and a "spiritual" rabbi for dealing with all the traditional religious and family roles that rabbis usually dealt with. The official rabbis were universally viewed as agents of the state by the Jewish communities.

=== The dual rabbinate ===
The problem of the "dual rabbinate" continued until the 20th century and World War I, with debates raging within the community itself about how to view and react to the situation. The Orthodox accepted only their traditional spiritual rabbis as legitimate, while progressive Jews thought that rabbis should also play a role in secular concerns such as social, economic, and intellectual aspects of their communities. Crown rabbis continued to perform their official duties all during this debate, and attended various Russian Rabbinic Congresses, such as the one in 1910.

At the 1910 Rabbinic conference the objective was to get rid of the Crown Rabbinate entirely, but this ran into problems because the Orthodox delegates by and large refused to encourage or require their (legitimate, spiritual, educated) rabbis to take on the administrative tasks fulfilled by the crown rabbis because that would require their learning Russian and to submit to the licensing authority of the Russian state which was far too much in the secular domain for an Orthodox rabbi to go. This caused a split among the delegates among those who saw nothing wrong with learning Russian and even thought it would avoid much of the misery the Jews had undergone, however this resulted in a stalemate and no new decisions were taken about it.

== Notable crown rabbis ==
Various men who became well known in the Jewish community initially served as a crown rabbi.

- Yiddish author Sholem Aleichem served in Lubny (Ukraine) from 1880–83.
- Zionist leader Shmarya Levin was a crown rabbi in the towns of Grodno and Ekaterinoslav (Dnipro) at the turn of the century.
- Isaac Schneersohn served in Gorodnya and Chernigov before emigrating to France and founding the Center of Contemporary Jewish Documentation.

== See also ==
- Hasidic Judaism
- Court Jew
- Hakham Bashi
- Landesrabbiner
- Schutzjude
- Shtadlan
