= Shmaryahu Levin =

Russian-born Jewish Zionist activist (1867–1935)

Shmarya Levin
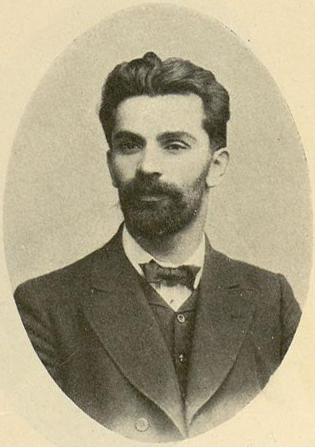
- Born: Shmaryahu Levin; March 23, 1867; Svislach, Belarus
- Died: June 9, 1935 (aged 68); Haifa, Israel
- Other name: Shmarya Levin
- Occupations: Russian Zionist Leader, Politician

Signature
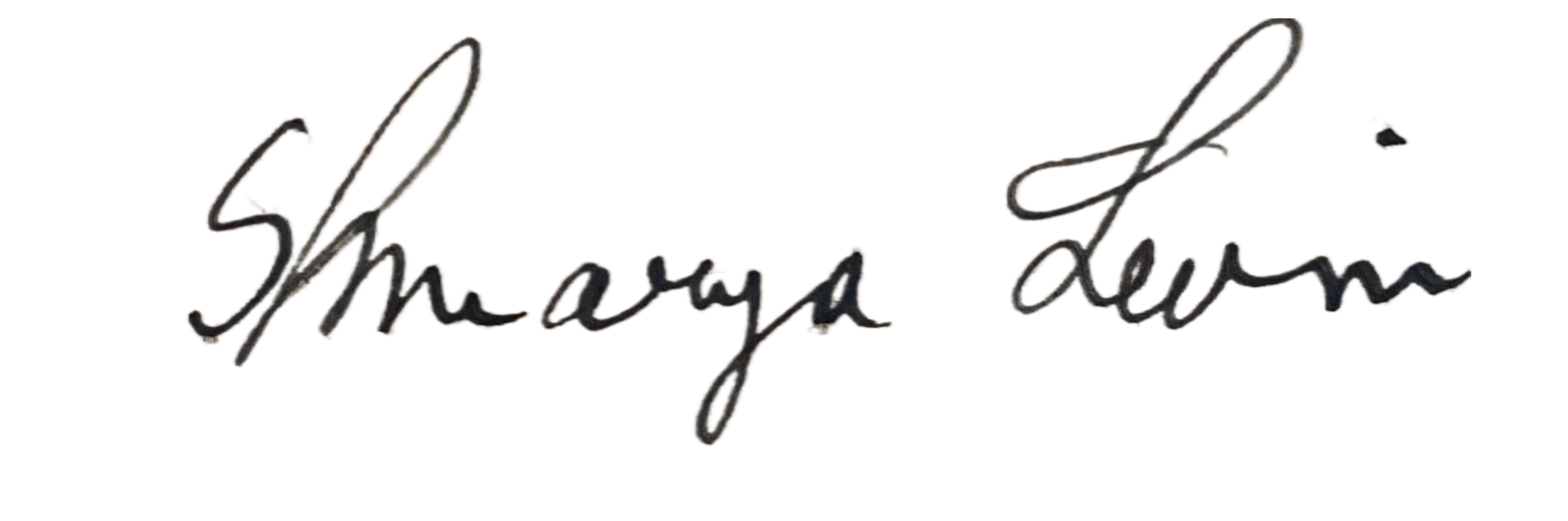

Shmaryahu Levin (Russian: Шмария Ха́имович Ле́вин; born 1867 in Svislach, Minsk Governorate; died 9 June 1935, Haifa), was a Jewish Zionist activist. He was a member of the first elected Russian Parliament in 1906.

== Biography ==
Levin, originally from Svisloch, Belorussia, became involved with Hovevei Zion during his early years. A follower of Ahad HaAm, as a young man, he and Leo Motzkin created the union of Jewish students in Russia during their time at university in Berlin. He wrote for Hebrew publications like Ha-Shilo'ah and Yiddish ones such as Der Yud and Der Fraynd.

Shmaryahu Levin served as a crown rabbi in the towns of Grodno (1896–97) and Ekaterinoslav (Dnipropetrovsk) from 1898 to 1904.

At the Sixth Zionist Congress in 1903, Levin was a prominent opponent of the Uganda Scheme. He also co-founded the League for the Attainment of Equal Rights for the Jewish People in Russia in 1905 and served on its central board. In 1906, Levin was elected to represent the Jewish National List from Vilna in the inaugural Russian Duma.

Shortly after the First Duma's dissolution, Levin escaped from Russia for Berlin. He was chosen to be a member of the Tenth Zionist Congress (1911). He participated in the activities of the Hilfsverein der deutschen Juden in Germany and helped to found a technical university in Haifa. He encouraged American Jews to support this endeavor. However, together with Ahad Ha-Am and J. Tschlenow, Levin resigned from the Technion board of governors after their proposal to switch to teaching in Hebrew was turned down.

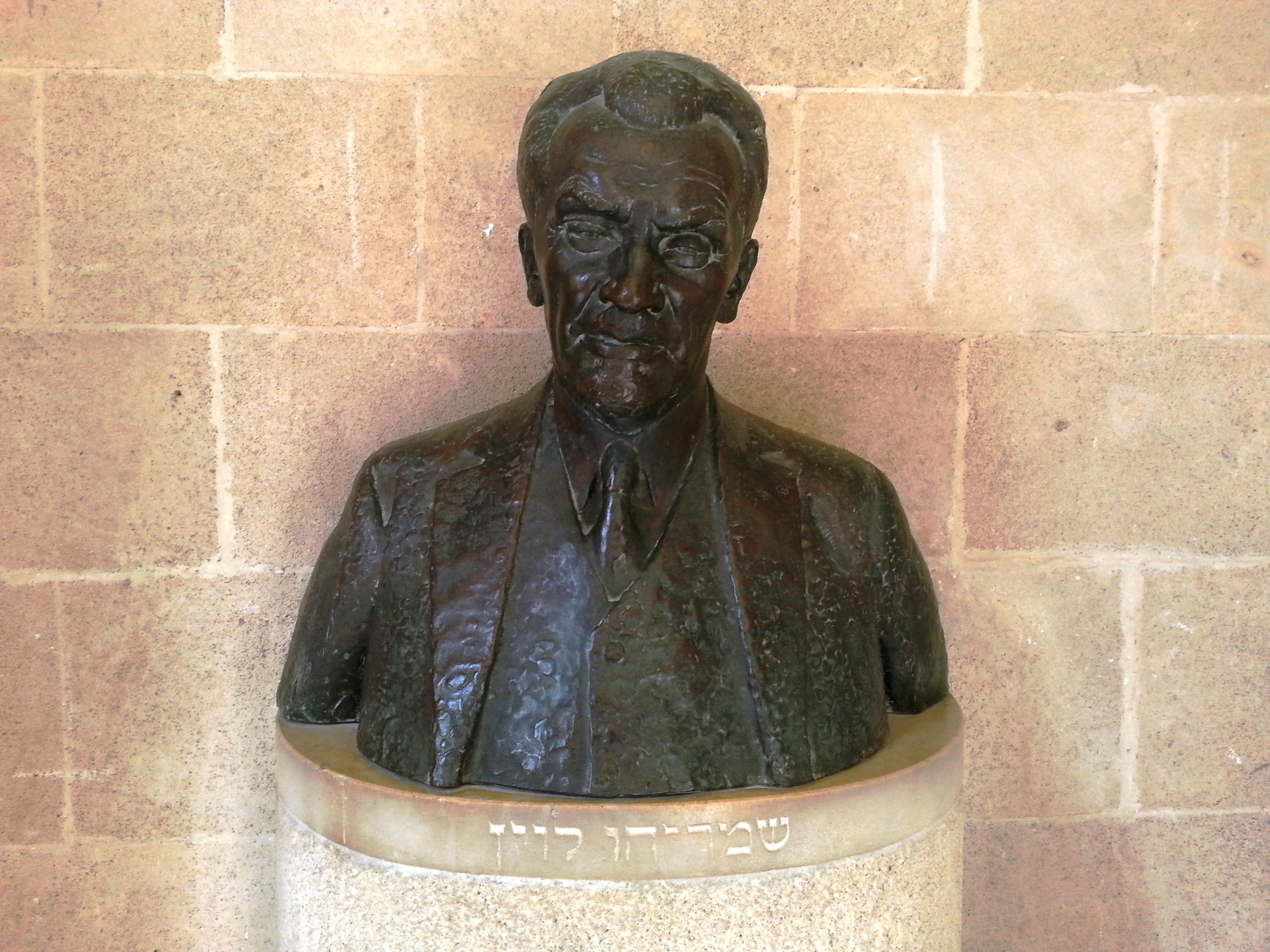
Bust of Shmarya Levin at the Technion

In the 1920s, Levin was a representative of the World Zionist Organization and director of the Information Department of Keren Hayesod.
