= Gurs internment camp =

Internment and concentration camp for refugees and Jews in France during World War II

Gurs
- Concentration camp
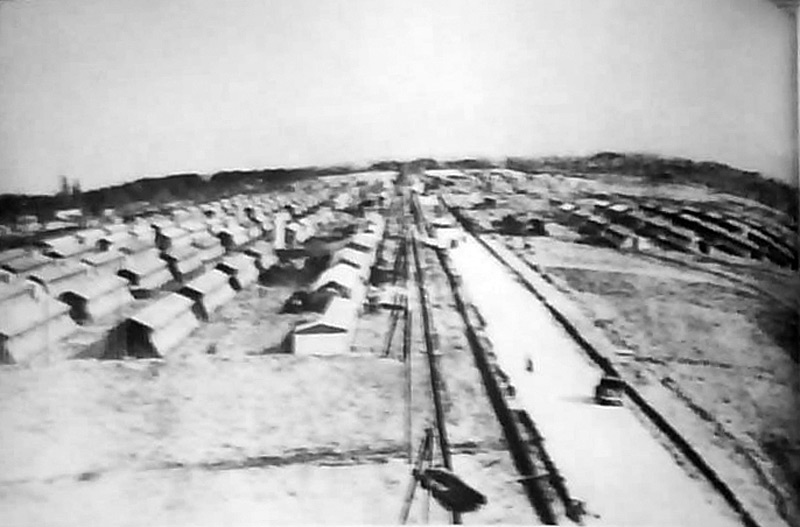
- Gurs c. 1939

- Location within France
- Coordinates: 43°15′53″N 0°43′54″W
- Known for: The only westward deportation of German Jews
- Location: Gurs, Pyrénées-Atlantiques
- Built by: French Third Republic
- Operated by: French Third Republic, Vichy France
- Original use: Internment of Spanish Republican refugees
- Inmates: German Jews, French political prisoners
- Number of inmates: 64,000 total, of whom 5,500 Jews deported via Drancy, mostly to Auschwitz
- Liberated by: Free French
- Notable inmates: Hannah Arendt; Horst Rosenthal; Charlotte Salomon; José Solchaga
- Notable books: Mickey au Camp de Gurs

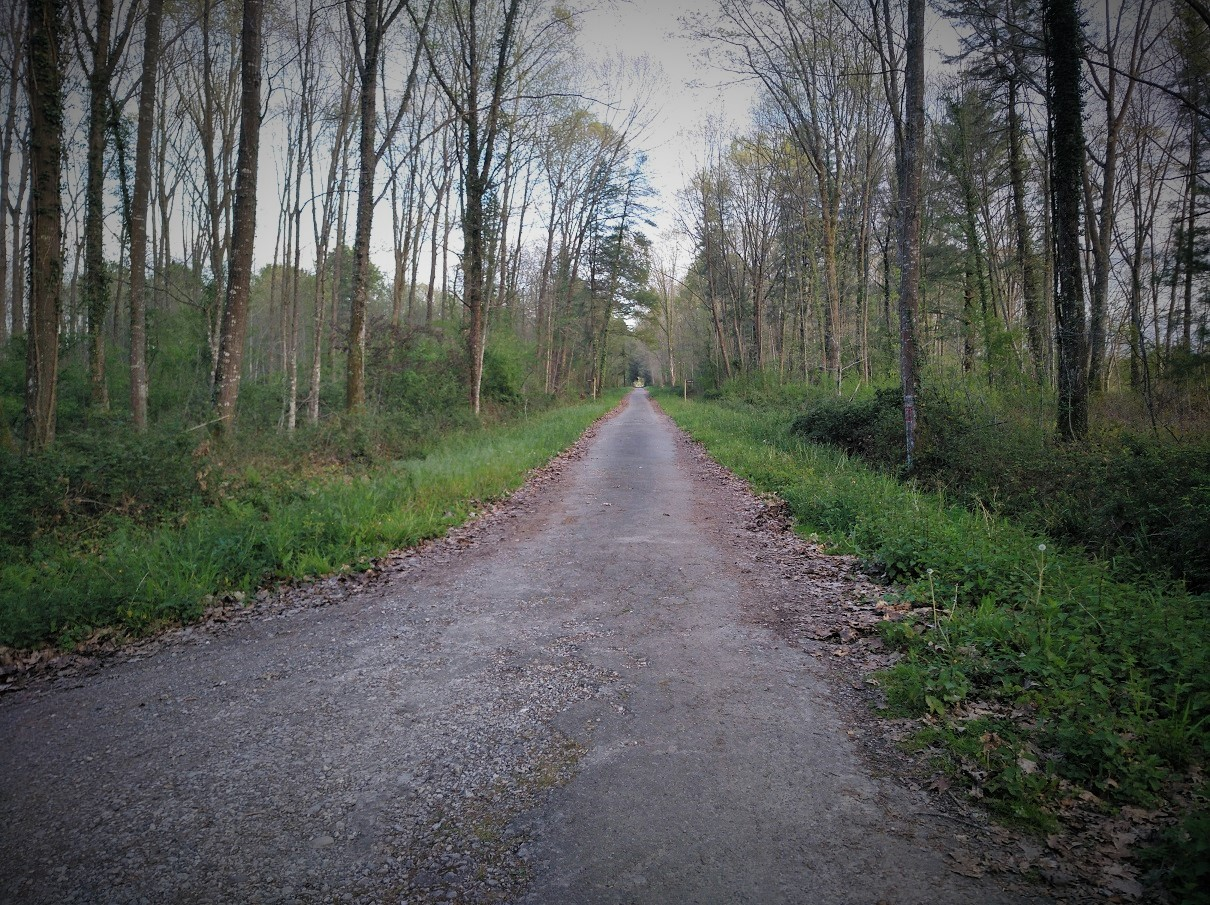
Present-day view of the former main street

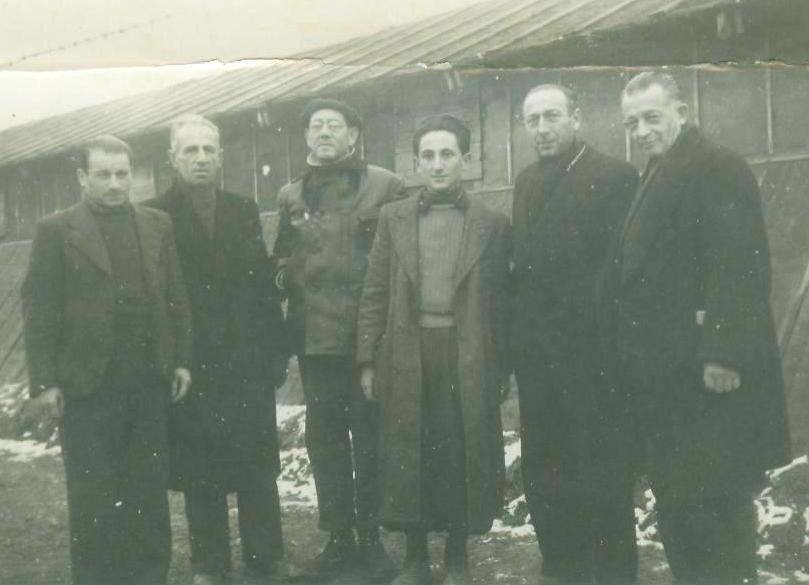
Internees in Gurs internment camp, some of them Jews, January 1941

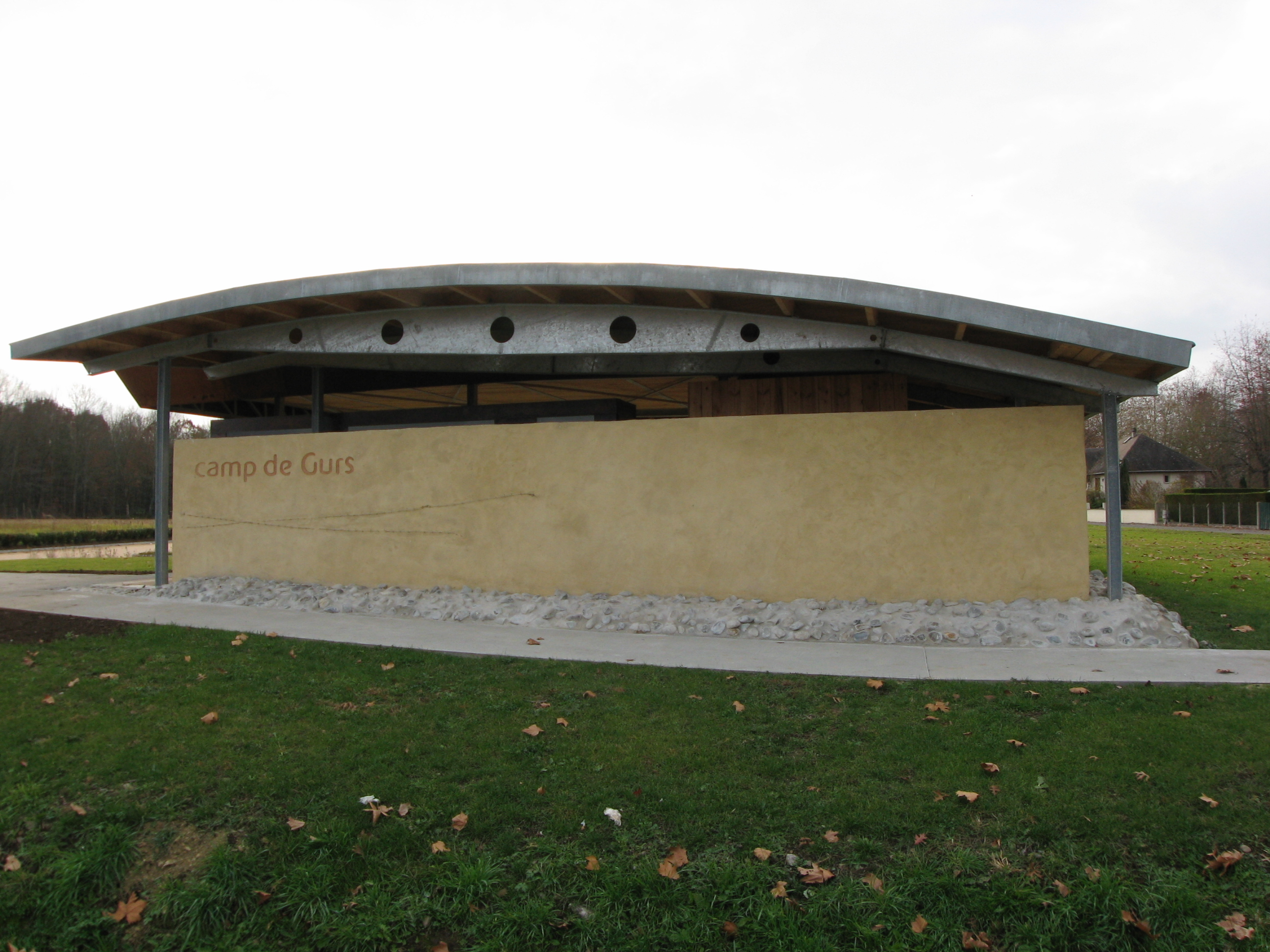
The Camp Gurs memorial, opened in 2007

Gurs internment camp (French: Camp de Gurs, pronounced [kɑ̃ də ɡyʁs]) was an internment camp and prisoner of war camp constructed in 1939 in Gurs, a site in southwestern France, not far from Pau.

The camp was originally set up by the French government after the fall of Catalonia at the end of the Spanish Civil War to control those who fled Spain out of fear of retaliation from Francisco Franco's regime. At the start of World War II, the French government interned 4,000 German Jews as "enemy aliens", along with French socialist political leaders and those who opposed the war with Germany.

After the Vichy government signed an armistice with the Nazis in 1940, it became an internment camp for mainly German Jews, as well as people considered dangerous by the government. After France's liberation, Gurs housed German prisoners of war and French collaborators.

Before its final closure in 1946, the camp held former Spanish Republican fighters who participated in the Resistance against the German occupation, because their stated intention of opposing the fascist dictatorship imposed by Franco made them threatening in the eyes of the Allies.

== Conditions ==
The camp measured about 1.4 km (0.87 mi) in length and 200 m (220 yd) in width, an area of 28 ha (69 acres). Its only street ran the length of the camp. On either side of the street were plots of land measuring 200 m (220 yd) by 100 m (110 yd), named îlots (blocks; literally, "islets"). There were seven îlots on one side and six on the other. The plots were separated from the street and from each other by wire fences. The fences were doubled at the back part of the plots to create a walkway along which the exterior guards circulated. In each plot stood about 30 cabins; there were 382 cabins altogether.

This particular type of cabin had been invented for the French army during the First World War; they had been built close to the front but outside the range of the enemy artillery, and they served to accommodate soldiers during the few days when the soldiers arrived at their barracks and awaited their trench assignment. They were assembled from thin planks of wood and covered with tarred fabric, all identical in construction and size. They were not fitted with windows or other insulation. They did not offer protection from the cold, and the tarred fabric soon began to deteriorate, allowing rainwater to enter the cabins. There were no internal toilets and residents slept on sacks of straw placed on the floor. Despite the fact that each cabin had an area of only 25 m^{2} (270 sq ft), it had to house up to 60 people at times of peak occupancy.

Food was scarce and poor quality; there was no sanitation, running water, or plumbing. The camp had poor drainage. The area, due to its proximity to the Atlantic Ocean, receives a great deal of rain, which made the clay campgrounds permanently muddy. The inmates made paths with the few stones they could find in a vain attempt to keep the mud in check. Pieces of wire that had been stripped of their barbs were placed between the cabins and the toilets and used by the refugees like the railing of a staircase, to maintain balance on the unsteady ground.

In each îlot there were rudimentary toilets, not very different from the sort of troughs that would be used to feed animals. There was also a platform about 2 m (6 ft 7 in) high, which one climbed using steps, and upon which were built additional toilets. Under the platform there were large tubs that collected excrement. Once they were full they were transported out of the camp in carts.

Around the camp were small buildings that housed the administration and the guard corps. The administration and care of the camp was conducted under military auspices until the fall of 1940, when a civil administration was installed by the Vichy regime.

== Internees ==
=== Originating from Spain ===
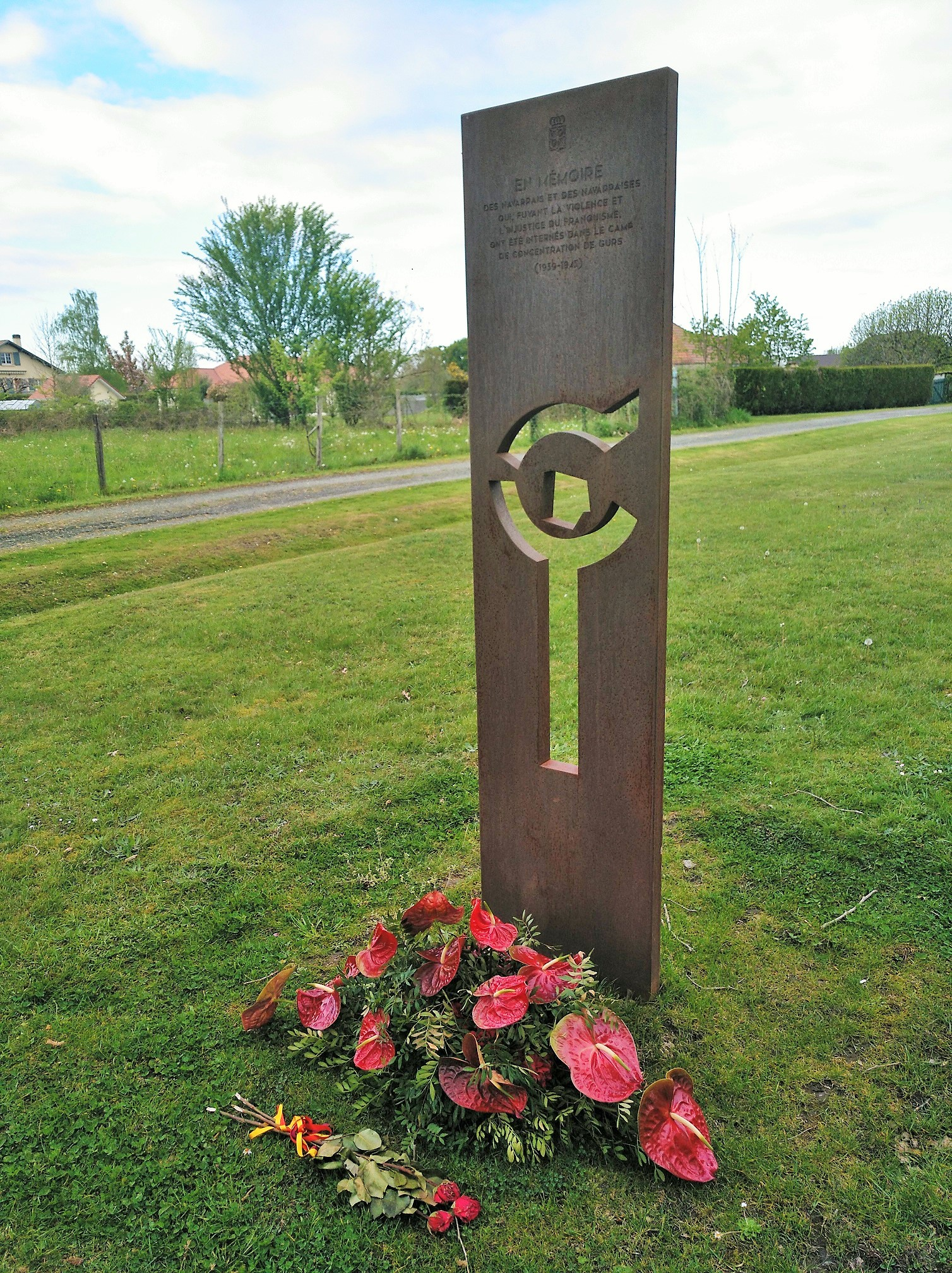
Memorial to the Navarrese refugees interned in Gurs

In April 1939, Basques, aviators and International Brigades members were transferred to Gurs.

Those arriving from Spain were grouped into four categories (here translated into English):

- Brigadists: They had belonged to the International Brigades fighting for the Second Spanish Republic. Due to their nationalities (German, Austrian, Czech, Russians etc), it was not possible for them to return to their countries of origin. Some managed to flee and many others ended up enlisting in the French Foreign Legion.
- Basques: They were gudaris (Basque nationalists and other Basque Government battalions) who had escaped from the siege of Santander and, transferred by sea to the Republican side, had continued fighting outside of their homeland. Due to the proximity of Gurs to their homeland, practically all managed to find local backing that permitted them to abandon the camp and find work and refuge in France.
- Airmen: They were members of the ground personnel of the Republican air force. Possessing a mechanical trade, it was easy for them to find French businessmen who gave them work, allowing them to leave the camp.
- Spaniards: They were farmers and had trades that were in low demand. They had no one in France who was interested in them. They were a burden for the French government and therefore they were encouraged, in agreement with the Francoist government, to return to Spain. The great majority did so and were turned over to the Francoist authorities in Irún. From there they were transferred to the Miranda de Ebro camp for purification according to the Law of Political Responsibilities.

From 1939 to the autumn of 1940, the language that dominated in the camp was Spanish. The inmates created an orchestra and constructed a sports field. On July 14, 1939, Bastille Day, the 17,000 internees of Spanish origin arranged themselves in military formation in the sports field and sang La Marseillaise, followed by sports presentations and choral and instrumental concerts.

German members of the International Brigade edited a newspaper in German by the name of "Lagerstimme K.Z. Gurs" of which there were more than 100 editions. The inhabitants of neighboring places could come to the camp and sell food to the inmates. For a time, the commander permitted some imprisoned women to rent a horse and cart and let them leave to camp to buy provisions more economically. There was a postal service and visits were also occasionally permitted.

=== "Undesirables" ===
At the start of World War II, the French government decided to use the camp also to house ordinary prisoners and citizens of enemy countries. The first contingent of these arrived at Gurs May 21, 1940, eleven days after the German government initiated its western campaign with the invasion of the Netherlands. To the Spaniards and Brigadists who still remained in the camp, were added:

- Germans who were found in France, without regard to ethnicity or political orientation, as foreign citizens of an enemy power. Among them stands out a significant number of German Jews who had fled the Nazi regime.
- Citizens of countries who were in the orbit of the Reich, like Austria, Czecho-Slovakia, Fascist Italy, or Poland.
- French activists of the left (trade unionists, socialists, anarchists, and especially, communists), who were considered dangerous under the Molotov–Ribbentrop pact; the first of these arrived 21 June 1940, and the majority were relocated in other camps before the end of the year.
- Pacifists who refused to work in the war industry.
- Representatives of the French extreme right who sympathized with the Nazi regime.
- Ordinary prisoners evacuated from prisons in the north of the country ahead of the German advance.
- Prisoners waiting trial for common crimes.

In contrast to the Spaniards, for whom there was generally sympathy, the internees from the second waves were known as "les indésirables", the undesirables.

=== Regime de Vichy ===
With the armistice between France and Germany in June 1940, the region in which the camp was situated formed part of the territory governed by the Vichy government, passing over to the civil authority. The military commander, before turning over command, burned the records in order to make it difficult for the new French government to locate and persecute many of the inmates who, informed of the change in command, had fled, disappearing among the French population who gave them shelter. After the war, the destruction of the records later made it difficult for many ex-prisoners to claim the compensation that was due to them for having been incarcerated.

Seven hundred of the prisoners, interned on account of their nationality or for being sympathetic to the Nazi regime, were released between August 21—the date of the arrival of the inspection commission sent by the German government to Gurs—and October. The Vichy government incarcerated:

- political dissidents.
- Jews who were not French nationals, also German Jews who escaped to France in 1930s; among those were Marion Wiesel and her family and Emilio Kerbel, the father of Mireille Knoll.
- German Jews deported by the SS from Germany.
- persons who had illegally crossed the border of the zone occupied by the Germans.
- Spaniards fleeing Francoist Spain.
- Spaniards who had already been in the camp, released in the fall of 1940, roamed around the country unemployed.
- Spaniards coming from other camps that had been condemned for being uninhabitable or due to their scarce contingent.
- stateless persons.
- people involved in prostitution
- homosexuals.
- Gypsies.
- indigents.

=== Jews deported from Baden ===
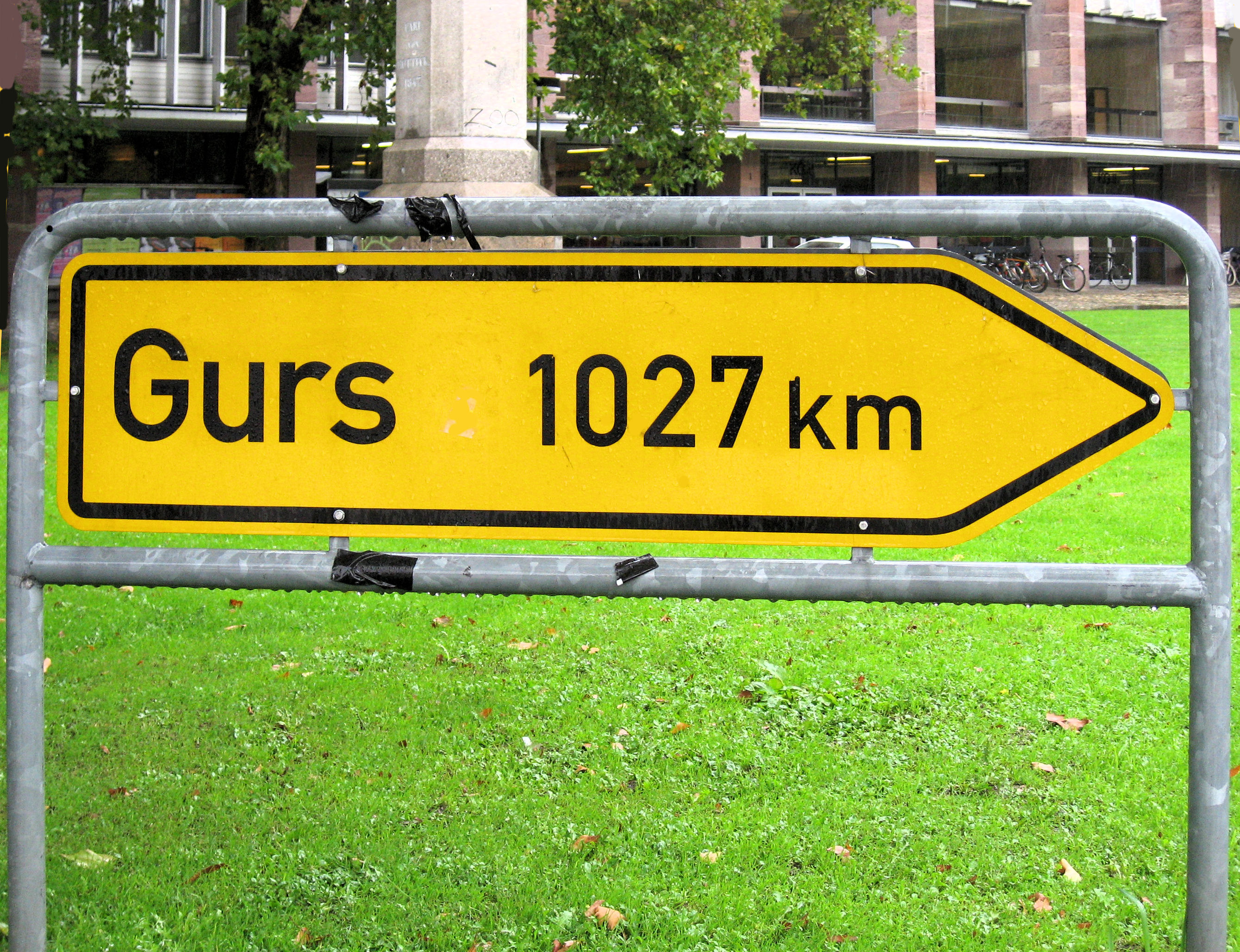
This memorial in the form of a German road sign is in Freiburg im Breisgau and commemorates the Nazi regime deportees

The most painful period in the camp's history began in October 1940. The Nazi Gauleiter ("governor") from the Baden region of Germany, Josef Bürckel, had also been named Gauleiter of the neighboring French region of Alsace. In Baden resided some 7,500 Jews; they were mainly women, children, and the elderly, given that the young and middle-aged men had emigrated (official Nazi policy, overseen and made more efficient by Adolf Eichmann) or had gone to the Nazi concentration camps.

The Gauleiter received word that the camp at Gurs was mostly empty, and on October 25, 1940, it was decided to evacuate the Jews from Baden (between 6,500 and 7,500) to Gurs as part of Operation Wagner-Bürckel. There, they remained locked up under French administration. The living conditions were difficult, and illness rife, especially typhus and dysentery.

The deportation of the German Jews to Gurs in October 1940 is a unique case in the history of the Holocaust, as it deals with the only deportation of Jews carried out toward the west of Germany by the Nazi regime. The Wannsee Conference, in which the above-mentioned extermination program was delineated, did not take place until January 1942.

=== Aid organizations ===
Beginning 20 December 1940, various humanitarian aid organizations intervened to lend their services: in addition to the Basque government-in-exile, posts were set up in Gurs belonging to the Swiss Humanitarian Aid Unit, Jewish French organizations tolerated by the Vichy regime, and organizations such as the Quakers and the YMCA.

On 15 February 1941, the Oeuvre de Secours aux Enfants (Children's Aid Society) installed a medical post and obtained permission to take numerous children away from Gurs, who would be housed in private homes throughout France.

=== Escapes ===
Security infrastructure in the camp was not as developed as many of its more eastern counterparts. However, escapers who were poorly dressed, lacking money and without knowledge of local dialects were quickly located and returned to the camp. Reclaimed prisoners were subsequently held for a time as punishment in an îlot called de los represaliados (of those suffering reprisals). In case of recidivism, they were sent to another camp. But an internee who could count on outside help could successfully escape, whether to Spain or a shelter on a flat in France. There were 755 who managed to escape.

=== Deportations to the East ===
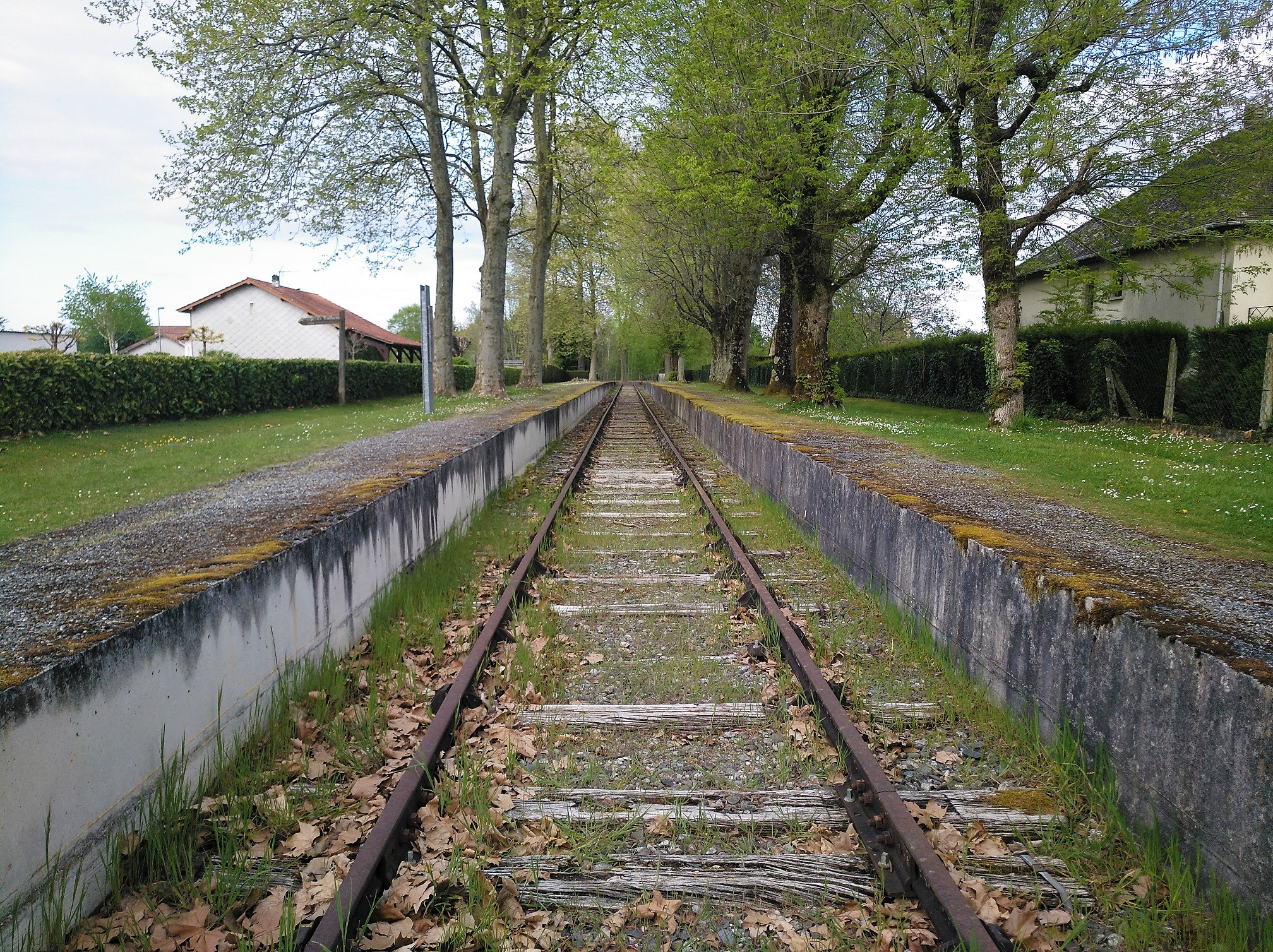
Memorial to the deportees

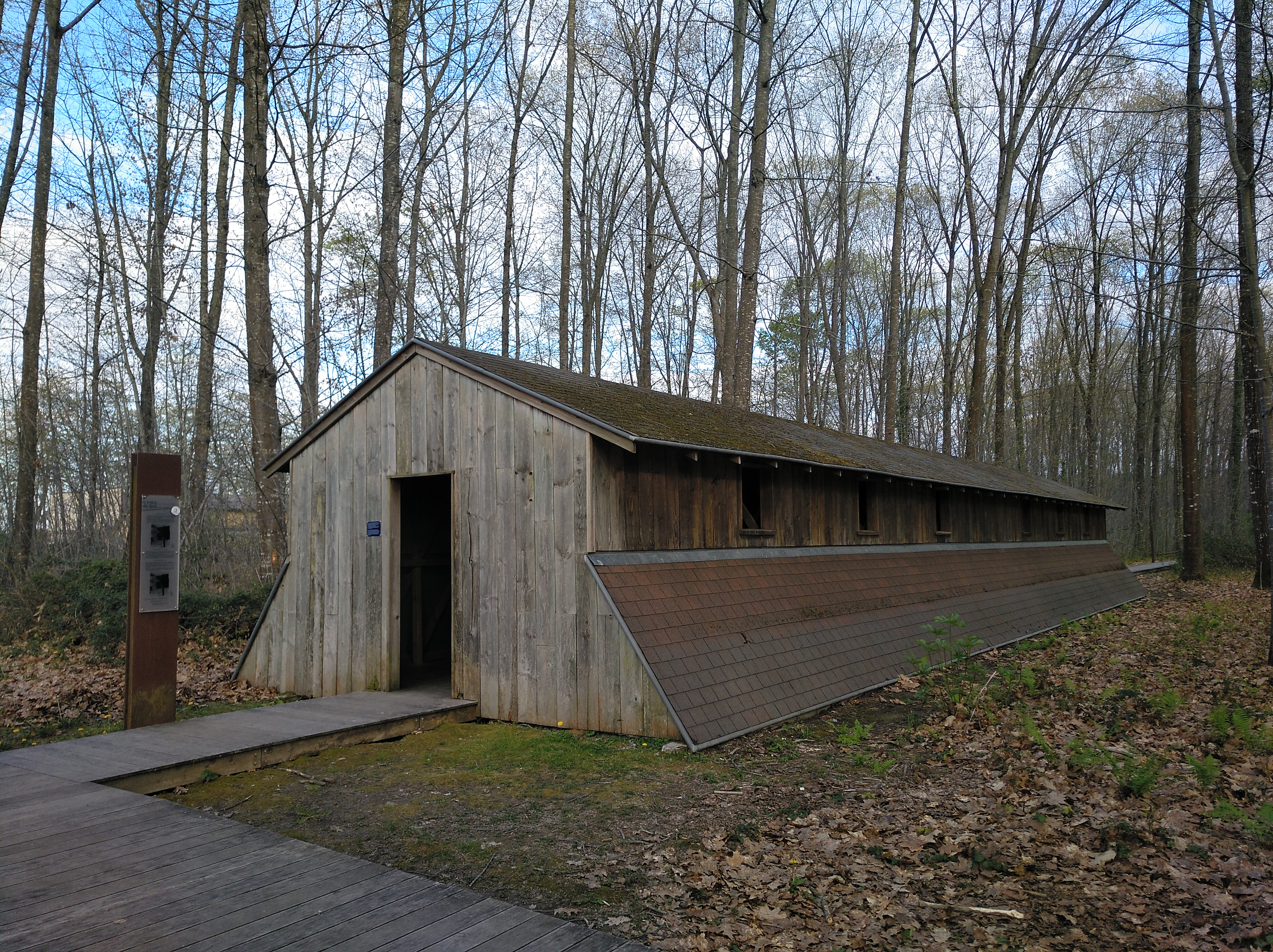
Replica of internment barracks

Once the program for the eradication of the Jews was put into motion in the camps in German-occupied Poland, the Vichy regime turned over the 5,500 Jews who were located in Gurs to the Nazis. On 18 July 1942, the SS captain, Theodor Dannecker, inspected the camp and then ordered that they prepare themselves to be transported to Eastern Europe. Beginning on August 6, they were sent in convoys to the Drancy deportation camp, on the outskirts of Paris, and later many were murdered in extermination camps. The majority of them were sent to Auschwitz.

=== Liberated France ===
Upon the withdrawal of the Germans from the region due to the advance of the Allied invasion of France, the French who took charge of Gurs locked up their countrymen accused of collaborating with the German occupiers as well as Spaniards, who having found refuge in France, had been fighting in the French Resistance against the German occupation. These men were not trying to enter into an armed conflict on the French-Spanish border and were not interested in confronting Franco, but the French feared they might and so held these Spaniards in Gurs for a short time. The camp also briefly housed German prisoners of war.

=== Dismantling ===
The camp was dismantled in 1946. The hill has since been covered in dense vegetation that still does not manage to absorb the water that flows from the clay soil. One can see a few stones that were paths and the bases of cabins. Groups of volunteers have begun to remove the overgrown weeds to display the origins in which some 64,000 people were forced to live during the various epochs of the camp.

== Camp Gurs today ==
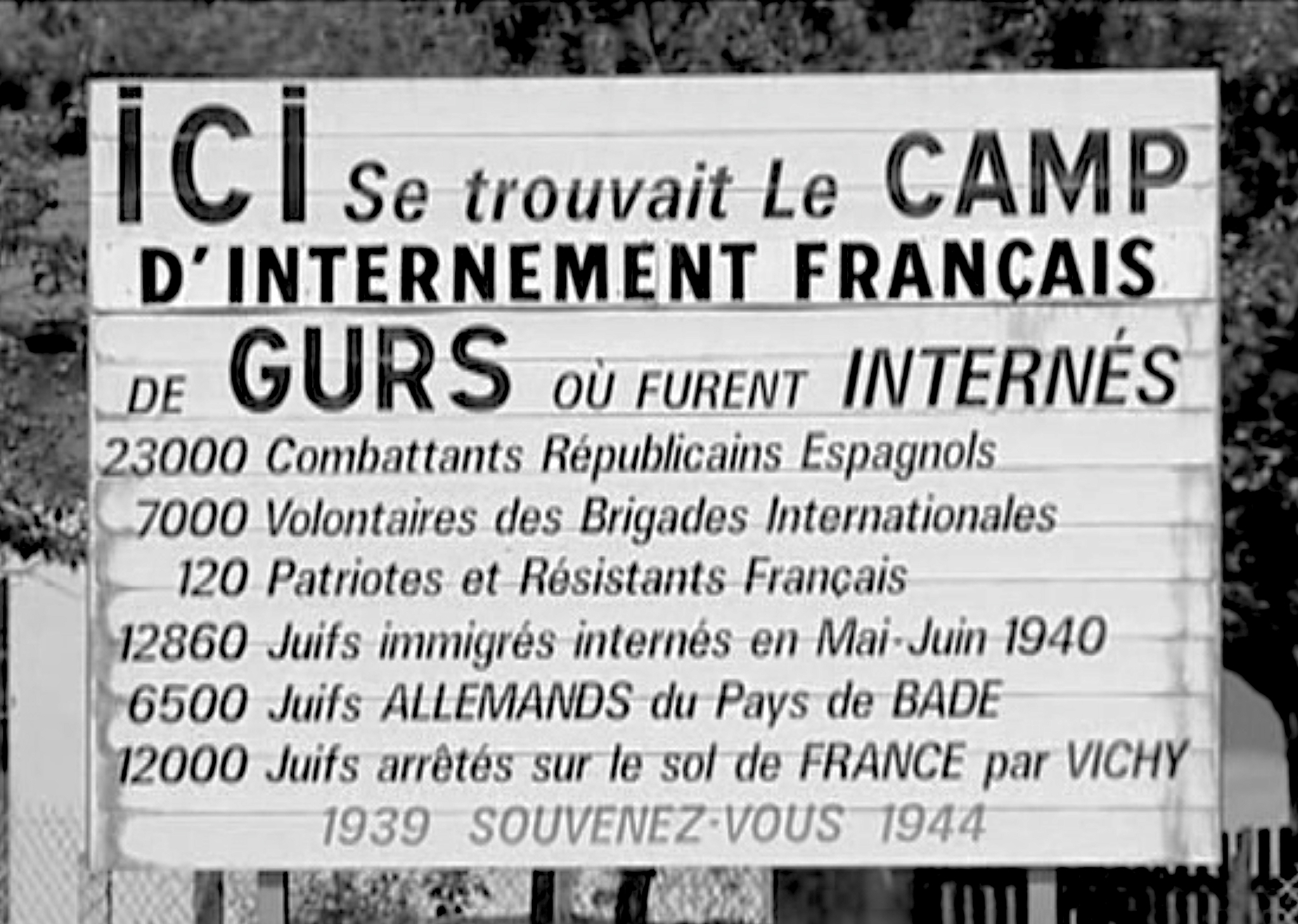
Sign erected in 1980

=== L'Amicale and L'Appel de Gurs ===
In 1979, on the 40th anniversary of the creation of the camp, the region's youth started to air the forgotten history of the camp by inviting old inmates to conferences and lectures. The event was well-publicized by the French, German, and Spanish press; as a result, the next year there was a reunion at Gurs on 20–21 June. The reunion drew a hundred former detainees, who came from many different countries. Also in attendance were people associated with the French resistance and survivors of the Nazi death camps. Together, these people created an organization called L'Amicale de Gurs. This organization developed an official newsletter called L'Appel de Gurs, which was full of emphatic catchphrases such as, "Gurs, a symbol of combat and the suffering of the peoples of Europe", and "Gurs, a concentration camp, calls for vigilance, for unity, and for action; actions taken so that man can live in freedom and dignity."

Since this date, a commemorative ceremony has been held annually. Some of the main participants in this ceremony have been Jewish organizations, representatives of citizens of Baden, former exiles, their relatives, and people of diverse nationalities who, by their presence, hope to point out the duty of every generation to remember the criminal acts of the dictatorial regimes that assaulted Europe during the 20th century.

=== Current state ===
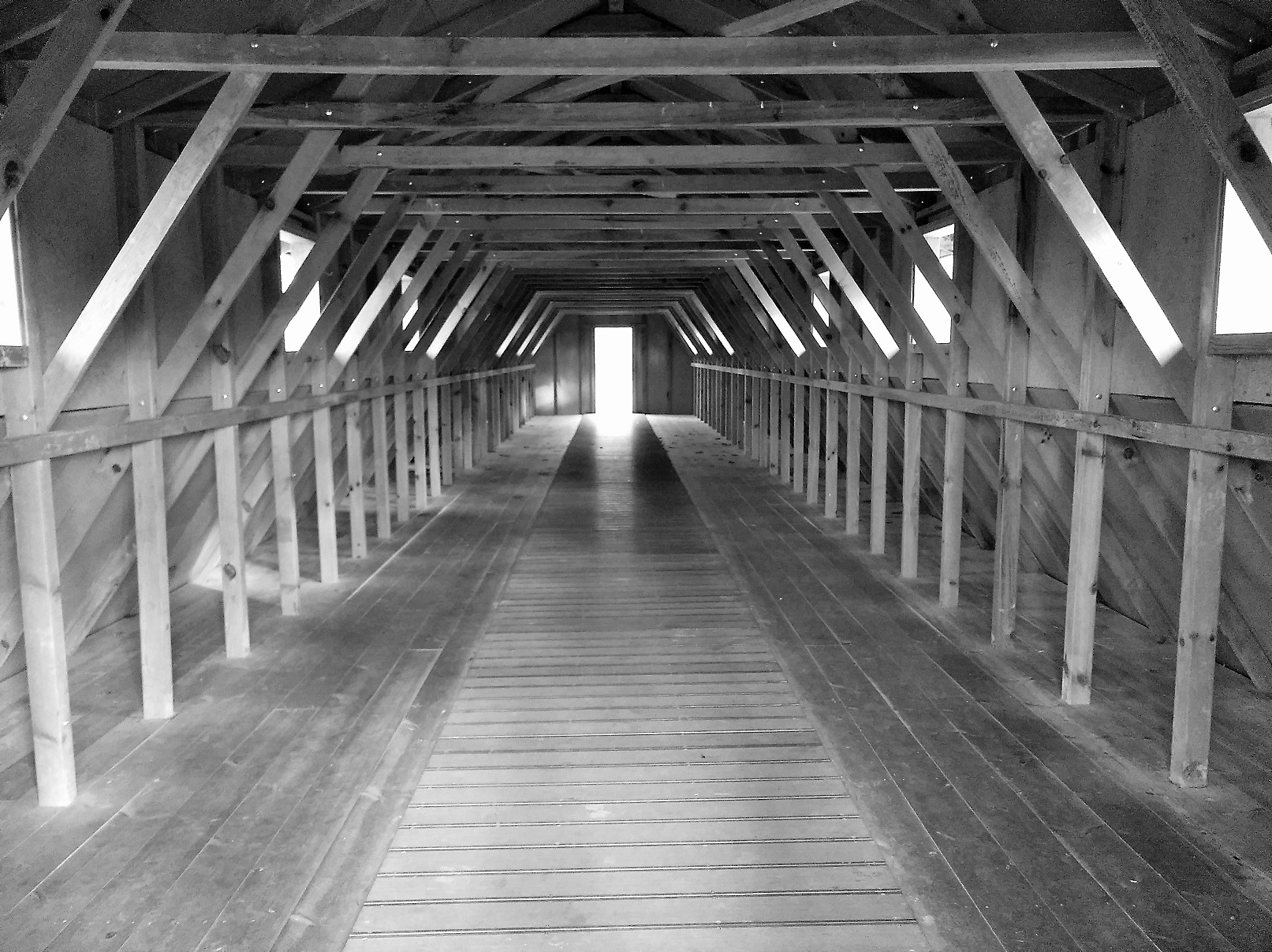
Interior of a barracks replica

Today the camp contains a reconstruction of a triangular cabin as a testimony to the hundreds of identical cabins that were lived in by the inmates. Like the original cabins, the reconstruction was made from thin slabs of wood covered in tarred cardboard. A few monuments recall the camp of the Gursiens, a name that was first used by the inhabitants of nearby towns to refer to the inmates and that was ultimately adopted by the inmates themselves.

=== Cemetery ===
The thick vegetation that covers the area occupied by the Gurs ilots contrasts sharply with the large Jewish cemetery, which is exquisitely maintained at the expense of the German cities that deported their German-Jewish population to Gurs. After the liberation in 1944, the French Association of Jewish communities of the Basses-Pyrénées took charge of Gurs' upkeep and erected a monument to the camp's victims. As the years passed, though, the cemetery itself fell into disrepair. Hearing of this disrepair, the mayor of Karlsruhe in 1957 took the initiative to have his city assume responsibility for the conservation of the camp, supported by the Jewish associations of Baden.

He got in touch with the parts of Baden that had deported their Jewish citizens to Gurs so that they could participate in the project. The French state, for its part, gave the federation of Jewish organizations of Baden the right to control the cemetery for the next 99 years. The German cities of Karlsruhe, Freiburg, Mannheim, Heidelberg, Pforzheim, Konstanz and Weinheim now pay the economic costs of the cemetery's upkeep.

Since 1985, the camp has had a memorial to the fighters of the Spanish Civil War who were interned in the camp; the camp's cemetery has a section set aside for the members of this group who have died. In 2000, the German War Graves Commission performed major renovations on this cemetery.

== Statistics on internees at Gurs ==
Refugees arriving from Spain (April 5 to August 31, 1939)
Basque nationalists	6,555
Brigadists	6,808
Airmen	5,397
Spaniards (excluding Basque nationalists from the Basque Autonomous Region in Spain)	5,760
Total	24,520

Others (September 1 to April 30, 1940)
Total	2,820

Undesirables (May 1 to October 24, 1940)
Spaniards	3,695
Germans and Austrians	9,771
French	1,329
Total	14,795

Internees during antisemitic legislation (October 25, 1940 to October 31, 1943)
Germans from Baden	6,538
Arrivals from Saint Cyprien camp	3,870
Spaniards	1,515
Others	6,262
Total	18,185

Last internees by the Vichy government (April 9, 1944 to August 29, 1944)
Total	229

Internees after the liberation (August 30, 1944 to December 31, 1945)
German prisoners of war	310
Anti-Franco Spaniards	1,475
Collaborators with the German occupiers	1,585
Total	3,370

Summary
Total before the liberation	60,559
Total after the liberation	3,370
Total people interned (1939–1945)	63,929

== See also ==
- Internment camps in France
- Camp de Rivesaltes
- World War II in the Basque Country
- Peter Sichel
