= Léon Poliakov =

French historian (1910–1997)

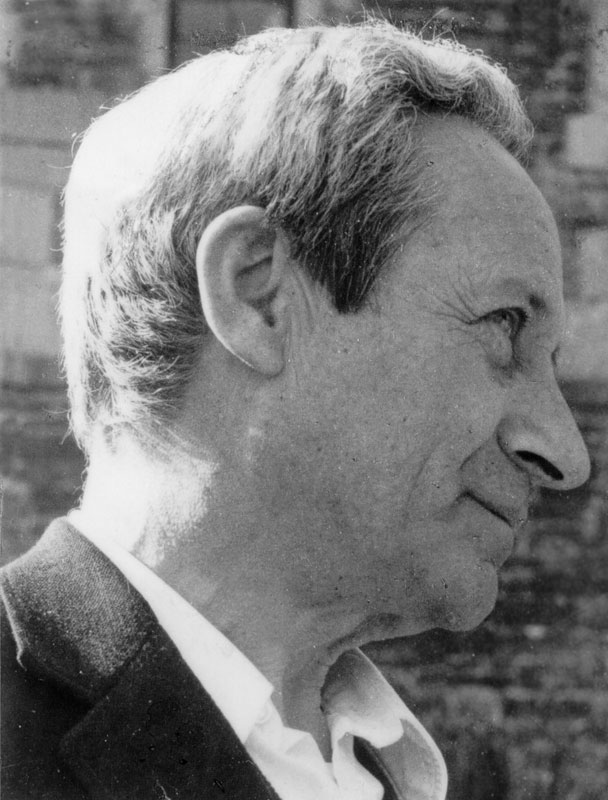
- Léon Poliakov
- Born: Лев Поляков (Lev Polyakov); November 25, 1910; Saint Petersburg, Russian Empire
- Died: December 8, 1997 (aged 87); Orsay, France
- Occupation: Historian

Léon Poliakov (Russian: Лев Поляков; 25 November 1910 – 8 December 1997) was a French historian who wrote extensively on the Holocaust and antisemitism. He is the author of The Aryan Myth.

== Biography ==
Born into a Russian Jewish family, Poliakov lived in Italy and Germany until he settled in France.

He cofounded the Center of Contemporary Jewish Documentation, established to collate documentation on the persecution of Jews during World War II. He also assisted Edgar Faure at the Nuremberg Trial.

Poliakov was director of research at the National Centre for Scientific Research (Centre national de la recherche scientifique) from 1954 to 1971.

Poliakov assessed the disposition of Pope Pius XII critically on various issues connected to the Holocaust in "The Vatican and the 'Jewish Question' - The Record of the Hitler Period - And After", published in November 1950 in the Jewish journal Commentary.

Although little noted at the time, Poliakov's 1951 Bréviaire de la haine ("Harvest of Hate") was the first major work on the genocide, predating Raul Hilberg's Destruction of the European Jews by a decade. It received some good reviews. Poliakov said in his memoirs that he refrained from even using the word "genocide", which was considered unfit for publication in 1951 when his groundbreaking work was first published.

== Publications ==
- L'étoile jaune - La situation des Juifs en France sous l'Occupation - Les législations nazie et vichyssoise (Editions Grancher, October 1999 - three texts: a book of 1949, an article in Historia magazine in 1968 and a text of 1980) ISBN 2-7339-0642-9
- Poliakov, Léon (1 June 1951). Bréviaire de la haine: Le IIIe Reich et les Juifs [Harvest of Hate, the 3rd Reich and the Jews] (in French). Calmann-Lévy. ISBN 978-2-7021-5174-7. OCLC 897450164., translated 1956 as Harvest of Hate: The Nazi Program for the Destruction of Jews in Europe
- The History of Anti-Semitism: From the Time of Christ to the Court Jews (orig. 1955; this tr. 1966; repr. University of Pennsylvania Press, 2003) ISBN 0-8122-1863-9
- The History of Anti-Semitism: From Mohammed to the Marranos (orig. 1961; tr. 1973; repr. University of Pennsylvania Press, 2003) ISBN 0-8122-1864-7, ISBN 0-8122-3767-6
- The History of Anti-Semitism: From Voltaire to Wagner (orig. 1968; tr. 1975; repr. University of Pennsylvania Press, 2003) [preview at Google Books ISBN 0-8122-1865-5
- The History of Anti-Semitism: Suicidal Europe. 1870–1933 (orig. 1977; tr. 1984; repr. University of Pennsylvania Press, 2003) [preview at Google Books ISBN 0-8122-3769-2
- The Aryan Myth: A History of Racist and Nationalistic Ideas In Europe (Barnes & Noble Books (1996)) ISBN 0-7607-0034-6
- Jews Under the Italian Occupation (coauthored with Jacques Sabille) (Howard Fertig; 1st American ed edition (December, 1983)) ISBN 0-86527-344-8
- «Moscou, troisième Rome» Moscow, The third Rome
- «L`Auberge des musiciens» (memoir)
- «L`envers du Destin» (autobiography)
- "De l'antisionisme à l'antisémitisme" (1969)
- Léon Poliakov; Josef Wulf, eds. (1959). Das Dritte Reich und seine Denker — Dokumente (in German). Berlin-Grunewald: Arani.
