= Center of Contemporary Jewish Documentation =

French organization, founded 1943

- Centre de documentation juive contemporaine
- Abbreviation: CDJC
- Formation: 28 April 1943
- Founder: Isaac Schneersohn
- Type: NGO
- Legal status: foundation
- Purpose: documenting World War II genocide
- Headquarters: Paris
- Location: 17 Rue Geoffroy l'Asnier, 75004 Paris
- Region served: France
- Services: archives, education, monuments, commemorations
- Website: memorialdelashoah.org

The Center for Contemporary Jewish Documentation was an independent French organization founded by Isaac Schneersohn in 1943 in the town of Grenoble, France during the Second World War to preserve the evidence of Nazi war crimes for future generations. Upon the Liberation of France, the center was moved to Paris. In 2005 it fused with the Mémorial de la Shoah.

The goal of the CDJC was to conduct research, publish documentation, pursue Nazi war criminals, seek restitution for victims of the Nazis, and to maintain a large archive of Holocaust materials, especially those concerning events affecting French Jewry. Part of the efforts of the CDJC include providing educational materials to students and teachers, guided museum visits and field trips, participation in international conferences, activities and commemorations, maintaining monuments and sites like the Mémorial de la Shoah and the monument at Drancy, and most importantly collecting and disseminating documentation about the Holocaust in their extensive archives.

== Background ==
While the Second World War was still underway, the Nazis had already formed a contingency plan that in case of defeat they would carry out the total destruction of German records of the extermination of millions of victims, per Heinrich Himmler's statement to SS officials that the history of the Final Solution would be "a glorious page that will never be written". They largely succeeded in this attempt. In France, the situation with respect to preserving war records was not much better, partly as a result of French state secrecy rules dating back to well before the war aimed at protecting the French government and the state from embarrassing revelations, and partly to avoid culpability. For example, at Liberation, the Prefecture of Police destroyed nearly all of the massive archive of Jewish arrest and deportation.

France's Jewish population before the war was around 300,000, of which 75,721 were deported, with only 2500 surviving. Political deportees fared better, with 37,000 returning. By the 1950s, the Jewish population was half what it was before the war, most of them from Eastern Europe. In the aftermath of the shock and trauma of the war, many Jews converted to Christianity, Frenchified their names, and the number of Jewish ceremonies performed (including circumcision which could identify males as Jewish) dropped precipitously. Many just wanted to forget, and disappear into French society; for most, gathering a history of the Holocaust was not a priority.

It was in this context, that a very small number of Jews first took on the task of preserving the record of events in order that it not be lost to history. In France, this occurred first at Drancy where camp registers were carefully preserved and turned over to the new National Office for Veterans and Victims of War; which however then held them in secret refusing to release copies even to the CDJC.

== Founding and early efforts ==
Already before the end of the war, Isaac Schneersohn, anticipating the need for a center to document and preserve the memory of the persecution for historical reasons and also support claims post-war, gathered 40 representatives from Jewish organizations together at his place at rue Bizanet in Grenoble which was under Italian occupation at the time in order to form a centre de documentation. Exposure meant the death penalty, and as a result little actually happened before liberation. Serious work began after the center moved to Paris in late 1944 and was renamed the Center of Contemporary Jewish Documentation (Centre de Documentation Juive Contemporaine, CDJC).

Its stated goal was to document the persecution and martyrdom of French Jewry by collecting massive amounts of documentation, to study discriminatory laws, to support attempts at recovery of confiscated Jewish property, to document the suffering as well as the heroism of the Jews, and to record the attitude of governments, administrations, and various sectors of public opinion.

Early efforts received little recognition for a number of reasons. One was that these were grassroots movements to preserve the memory of the Holocaust, much of it by people who were not part of academia or trained as historians and thus looked down on by professionals. Another reason was that much of the early historiography focused on the perpetrators, with little effort aimed at documenting the experience of victims, which was relegated to the domain of "memory" rather than that of "history". In addition, early efforts consisted of collecting and publishing primary sources and survivor testimonies, and rarely on analysis and thematic interpretation of events which might have attracted more attention from academia. Finally, Schneersohn wanted CDJC to be the sole repository and outlet for historiography on the Holocaust, and when for example Poliakov published outside the CDJC in 1951, they had a falling-out. However, the early efforts in collecting, documenting, and preserving the basic information laid the groundwork for all future Holocaust historiography. The Nuremberg trials presented the opportunity for its first public appearance on the world stage.

== Relocation to Paris ==
After the liberation in 1944, the CDJC moved to Paris. In 1956 it moved to the Marais, the Jewish district of Paris in the 4th arrondissement, sharing space in the building containing the memorial to the Unknown Jewish Martyr. Renovations were undertaken in 2004 to handle expansion and to be able to host conferences and have exhibition space.

== Publications ==
=== Early publications ===
Early publications in the 1940s had limited exposure, such as Les Juifs sous l'Occupation: Recueil de textes francais et allemands 1940-1944 and La Condition des Juifs sous l'occupation allemande 1940-44. Starting in 1951, works such as Poliakov's Bréviaire de la haine (Harvest of Hate), the first major work on the genocide, first began to reach a wider audience and receive some good reviews in opposition to the prevailing opinion in studies at the time that a major genocide of six million Jews was logistically impossible and thus could not have happened. Most CDJC publications were not in bookstores and were not widely available. There was little public interest in the Holocaust, and financial returns were minimal.

Reaction to early CJDC publications in early postwar France

During the first period until 1955, most publications depended on German archives to document anti-Jewish persecution in France going back to the Dreyfus period, and served both Vichy and the Nazis. However any indication in new scholarship that attempted to pin any amount of culpability on the French ran counter to public feeling in France at the time, which was that the Germans were responsible for all persecution and that the French were either blameless victims or members of, or helping the Resistance. Vichy was considered an unpleasant aberration, and the general feeling was to avoid discussion about it so as to avoid poking old wounds. The three-volume Le commissariat General aux Question Juives by Joseph Billig published in 3 volumes in 1955-60 showed that the French response to roundups of Jews when they were not actively profiting from the spoils, was apathetic at best. The book was mostly ignored due to the prevailing feeling at the time but since has been considered a seminal work. Because of these factors and the general atmosphere at the time, the CDJC operated almost in an underground manner. Poliakov said in his Memoires that even the word genocide was considered unfit for publication in 1951 when his groundbreaking work was first published.

=== Periodicals ===
The CDJC began publishing a periodical bulletin in 1945 which continued appearing under various names, into the 21st century. It began in April 1945 as the Bulletin du Centre de Documentation Juive Contemporaine (Bulletin of the Center of Contemporary Jewish Documentation) which printed eight issues through January 1946. These were not sold openly. It stopped publishing temporarily in September 1945, when Schneersohn applied to the French Minister of Information for permission to publish, under the new name Revue du Centre de Documentation Juive Contemporaine (Journal of the Center of Contemporary Jewish Documentation). This, in turn, officially changed its name to Le Monde Juif (Jewish World) in July 1946, and was published as a monthly, 24-page magazine with about 1500 charter subscribers. Its first issue was published in August 1946. In 1995, it was renamed as Revue d'histoire de la Shoah – Le Monde Juif (Journal of the History of the Shoah–Jewish World) and finally ending up as the Revue d'histoire de la Shoah in 2005. The CDJC initials had disappeared from the cover and were incorporated instead as part of the new logo adopted by the Mémorial de la Shoah, Musée, Centre de Documentation Juive Contemporaine.

== War crimes trials ==
One of the core missions of the CDJC is to bring perpetrators of war crimes to justice. CDJC played a role at Nuremberg, and has participated in several high-profile and numerous other actions. The most well known cases are those of Adolf Eichmann, Klaus Barbie, and Maurice Papon.

=== Nuremberg trials ===
The Nuremberg trials began in November 1945. Schneerson sent Léon Poliakov who had recently joined CJDC as a historian to Nuremberg as an expert researcher, along with an assistant, Joseph Billig. They founded Jewish World War II historiography alone with no training. Many documents in evidence at Nuremberg ended up in the Center, and became the kernel of their photo and document archives. These, in turn, were used in France in the post-war years in many war crime trials, such as those of Klaus Barbie, Maurice Papon and others. The Center was also responsible for bringing a key document to light, the original order for the 1944 roundup of Jewish refugee children of Izieu who were later deported to Auschwitz and murdered upon arrival.

Contrary to the opinion that there was no serious scholarship about the Holocaust before the early 1960s, the CDJC had been active going back to the 1940s and 50s, although their efforts were little noted even by historians and were almost totally unknown to the public. The Eichmann trial in 1961 changed all that, and the decision to televise it brought the trial and the history of the Holocaust into millions of homes and riveted the attention of the world. The Barbie trial in Lyon in 1987 once again brought the history of World War II onto the front pages of newspapers and public awareness, and again the proceedings were filmed, due to their exceptional historical importance. In both cases, the archives maintained by the CDJC played a role.

=== Adolf Eichmann ===
The trial of Adolf Eichmann for crimes against humanity began in Jerusalem on 11 April 1961. The Israeli government arranged for the trial to have prominent media coverage, and the worldwide press was there. CDJC science director Georges Wellers served as a witness in the Eichmann trial. One of the goals of the trial was to disseminate information about the Holocaust to the public, and for the great majority of people around the world watching or reading about it, the Eichmann trial was their first confrontation with anything having to do with the Holocaust. As a result of all the coverage, it sparked interest in wartime events, which ultimately resulted in an increase in coverage of the war in public school education, publication of memoirs as well as academic studies which helped promote public awareness of the Holocaust. Eichmann was sentenced to capital punishment, and the sentence was carried out on 1 April 1962.

=== Klaus Barbie ===
Klaus Barbie was a Gestapo member, known as the "Butcher of Lyon" for having personally sadistically tortured French prisoners including men, women, and children, in Lyon, France. He was responsible for arresting French Resistance member Jean Moulin, and for signing the deportation order for the children from the orphanage at Izieu. He was wanted for crimes committed in Lyon between 1942 and 1944.

After being tracked and discovered by the Klarsfelds (Serge and Beate Klarsfeld) living in Bolivia in 1971, Barbie was eventually extradited and returned to France in 1983. He faced trial 11 May 1987 in Lyon before the Cour d'assises. As in the case of the Eichmann trial, the court recognized the great historical importance of the trial, and very exceptionally allowed it to be filmed.

The CDJC was in possession of a key document relating to the deportation of the children from Izieu, and provided a copy to the French courts, which enabled the prosecution of Barbie for Crimes against Humanity. Barbie had been tried in absentia in 1952 and 1954, and French law prohibits double jeopardy. But the charges did not include events at Izieu, and so it was this charge, backed by the evidence provided by the telegram supplied by the CDJC, which enabled his prosecution and conviction. Faure had actually read the Barbie telegram in his summation to the jury at Nuremberg but without naming him as he was not on trial there, but merely as a way of describing the routine, administrative nature of the killing that was carried out by the Nazis. It wasn't until the Barbie trial, that his name was linked to the telegram.

Barbie was sentenced to a life term, and died of natural causes in prison in 1991.

== 1970s and 80s ==
Until the 1970s, almost all Holocaust studies emanating from France came from the CDJC and its historians, and no serious works appeared from French universities or other historical scholarship from within France. When serious studies finally did come out in the 1970s and 1980s outside the CDJC, they came from abroad, including the United States, Canada, and Germany, such as Robert Paxton's seminal Vichy France: Old Guard and New Order, 1940-1944 which hit France like a hurricane and sparked the "Paxtonian revolution", as it was known in France, in Vichy historiography. Attacked vehemently at first by French historians and others, he ended up being awarded the Legion of Honor in 2009.

== CDJC and Yad Vashem ==
Before 1982, only one conference was held in France on the subject of the Holocaust, and it was one organized in 1947 by the CDJC. Schneersohn wanted to make Paris the primary world center for the memory of the genocide, but Zionists had other ideas and ultimately Schneersohn agreed in 1953 to a division of responsibilities with the Yad Vashem memorial center in Israel with the latter holding most of the responsibilities.

== Memorials and monuments ==
Part of the CDJC's mission is to establish and maintain monuments or memorials to promote the remembrance of the Holocaust.

=== Memorial of the Unknown Jewish Martyr ===
A tradition of honoring the unknown soldier existed in France since the post-World War I era. As a way of combatting forgetfulness of the genocide, Schneersohn added a Memorial Tomb to the CDJC Center which was inaugurated in October 1956. The Memorial of the Unknown Jewish martyr (Mémorial du martyr juif inconnu) was dedicated at the CDJC and became the central memorial and symbol of Jewish memory in France, serving as the venue for Holocaust commemorations.

In 2005, the CDJC and the Memorial of the Unknown Jewish Martyr merged, and was renamed the Mémorial de la Shoah; the new entity opened its doors on January 27, 2005.

=== Memorial at Drancy ===
During the Occupation 90% of Jews and others deported to the concentration camps passed through the Drancy internment camp. From 1942 to 1944, about 63,000 Jews were interned here and sent east.

Land for a memorial at Drancy was donated by Drancy City Hall, and funded by the Foundation for the Memory of the Shoah. The memorial was billed as an adjunct to the one in Paris, and a way to introduce the public to the former internment camp there—a place of history, and of remembrance.

The Shoah Memorial was inaugurated September 21, 2012 at Drancy by François Hollande, President of the Republic.

== Holdings and selected works ==
The Center has a large library and has published many documents, including some from the French Gestapo, the German Embassy in Paris, the German Supreme Military Command in France, and the French General Commissariat for Jewish Affairs (CGQJ). The original holdings stemmed from a huge collection of documents and photos received from the Allies after Nuremberg.

A selection of some individual documents and publications of historical interest include:

- Breviaire de la Haine, by L. Poliakov; 1951
- Commissariat Général aux Questions Juives (1955–57) by J. Billig
- La Revue de l'histoire de la Shoah, a semi-annual journal by CDJC

== Timeline ==
Selected chronology related to the Center of Contemporary Jewish Documentation or in the context of current events:

- 1880 Isaac Schneersohn born in western Ukraine. Becomes a rabbi, enters politics.
- 1920 Schneersohn Immigrates to France, and acquires French nationality. Marries, has three sons, lives in Paris.
- 1939 Schneersohn moves to Bordeaux, then to the Dordogne in 1941.
- 1940 May France invaded; falls to Germany a month later
- 1940 June 22 Armistice signed with Germany; creation of Occupied France, Vichy Regime, and the Italian zone
- 1940 July 16 Jewish denaturalization law begins series of anti-Jewish laws instituted by Vichy regime
- 1942-44 The Holocaust in France
  - 1942-44 75,000 Jews deported, most of them via Drancy internment camp, very few survive
  - 1942 Jul 16-17 Vel' d'Hiv Roundup
  - 1944 April 6 deportation of the children of Izieu
  - 1944 June 9–10 massacres of Tulle and Oradour-sur-Glane
- 1943 April 28 creation of CDJC as Schneersohn calls meeting at his home in Grenoble under the Italian occupation with 40 leading Jews
- 1944 June 6 D-Day Allies land at Normandy
- 1944 August 25 Liberation of Paris
- 1944 August Schneersohn and Poliakov return to Paris, and during the turmoil seize five important caches of documents, creating the kernel of the CDJC archives
  - General Commissariat for Jewish Affairs (CGQJ)
  - Vichy Regime
  - German Embassy at Paris
  - German staff headquarters
  - Gestapo in Paris
- 1944 October CDJC is moved to Paris
- 1945 Feb Yalta Conference - Allies state intention to dispense justice after war's end
- 1945 May 8 Victory in Europe Day
- 1945 Nov-1946 Oct Nuremberg Trials
- 1945-1951 first publications of CDJC have limited exposure; 3-5 books per year for next six years
- 1946 Oct 14 IVth Republic declared in France, creation of new Constitution
- 1947 first conference on the subject of the Holocaust in France was organized by CDJC—France would not see another before 1982
- 1951 Léon Poliakov publishes Harvest of Hate in 1951; genocide still too sensitive a word to see in print
- 1953 Schneerson agreement with Yad Vashem on division of responsibilities
- 1953 cornerstone laid for Memorial of the Unknown Jewish Martyr at CDJC Paris; inaugurated in Oct 1956
- 1955-60 blockbuster work by Joseph Billig published in 3 volumes over six-year period
- 1956 CDJC moves to Paris, takes space in Marais in building of the memorial to the Unknown Jewish Martyr
- 1961 Eichmann trial in Jerusalem
- 1969 June 25 Schneersohn dies in Paris.
- 1972 Robert Paxton's seminal Vichy France: Old Guard and New Order, 1940-1944 sparks the "Paxtonian revolution" in French Holocaust historiography
- 1987 Klaus Barbie tried in Lyons
- 2005 CDJC and the Memorial of the Unknown Jewish Martyr merge, become the new Shoah Memorial
- 2012 Drancy Shoah Memorial inaugurated by President of the Republic

== See also ==
- Isaac Schneersohn - founder of CDJC
- Jewish Documentation Center
- History of the Jews in France
- Vichy laws on the status of Jews - discriminatory laws passed by Vichy French government in 1940 and 1941
- The Holocaust in France
- Yad Vashem - Holocaust memorial museum in Israel
- Mémorial de la Shoah - Paris museum dedicated to Jewish history during World War II, and which also houses the CDJC
