= Mémorial de la Shoah =

French Holocaust museum in Paris

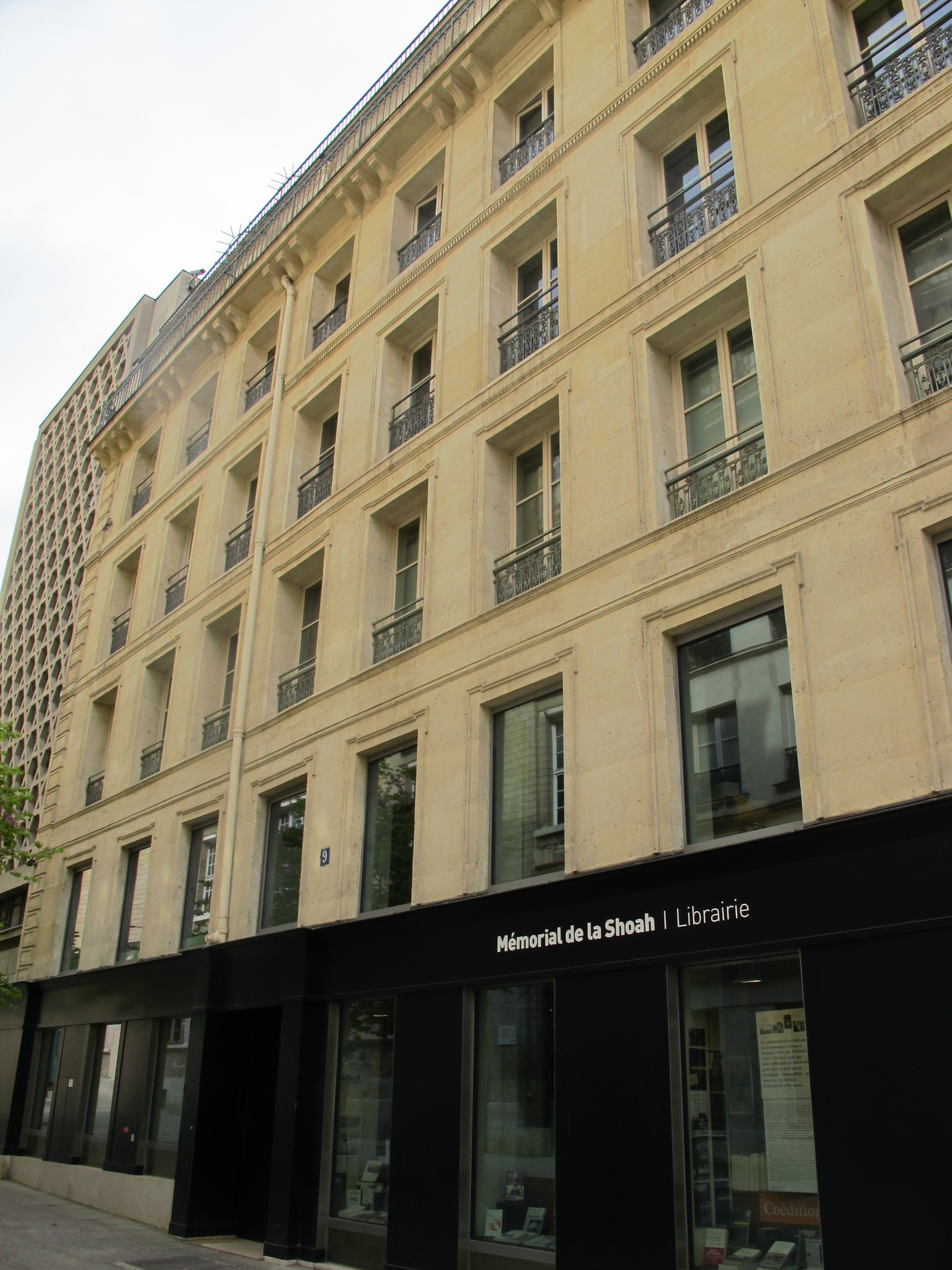
- Former name: Mémorial du martyr juif inconnu
- Established: 27 January 2005
- Location: 17 rue Geoffroy-l'Asnier, 75004 Paris, France
- Coordinates: 48.854846°N 2.356196°E
- Key holdings: archives of World War II deportations, personal objects of deportees, Memorials
- Founder: Isaac Schneersohn
- Website: memorialdelashoah.org

Mémorial de la Shoah is the Holocaust museum in Paris, France. The memorial is in the 4th arrondissement of Paris, in the Marais district, which had a large Jewish population at the beginning of World War II.

The memorial was opened, by President Jacques Chirac, on 27 January 2005. This day was chosen to coincide with International Holocaust Remembrance Day and the 60th anniversary of the liberation of Auschwitz concentration camp. The memorial underwent a major renovation in 2005, creating exhibition spaces, a multimedia center, and a reading room.

== Areas of the memorial ==
=== Forecourt ===
The forecourt of the memorial above the memorial crypt, includes a circular memorial listing the names of the death camps and the Warsaw Ghetto. There is also a wall with seven bas-reliefs by Arbit Blatas that symbolize the camps and the persecution of the Jews. The facade of the building, above the forecourt, has two inscriptions. First, a line from an adaptation of Deuteronomy 25:17 by Zalman Schnoeur (translated from Hebrew):

Remember what Amalek did unto our generation, which exterminated 600 myriad bodies and souls even though there was no war.

Second, a quote from Justin Godart, Minister of Health and Honorary President of the Committee for the Unknown Jewish Martyr (translated from French):

Before the unknown Jewish martyr, incline your head in piety and respect for all the martyrs; incline your thoughts to accompany them along their path of sorrow. They will lead you to the highest pinnacle of justice and truth.

=== Wall of Names ===
Several walls that make a passageway to the building list the names of the approximately 76,000 French Jews who were deported and murdered by the Nazis. They are listed alphabetically by year of deportation.

=== Crypt ===
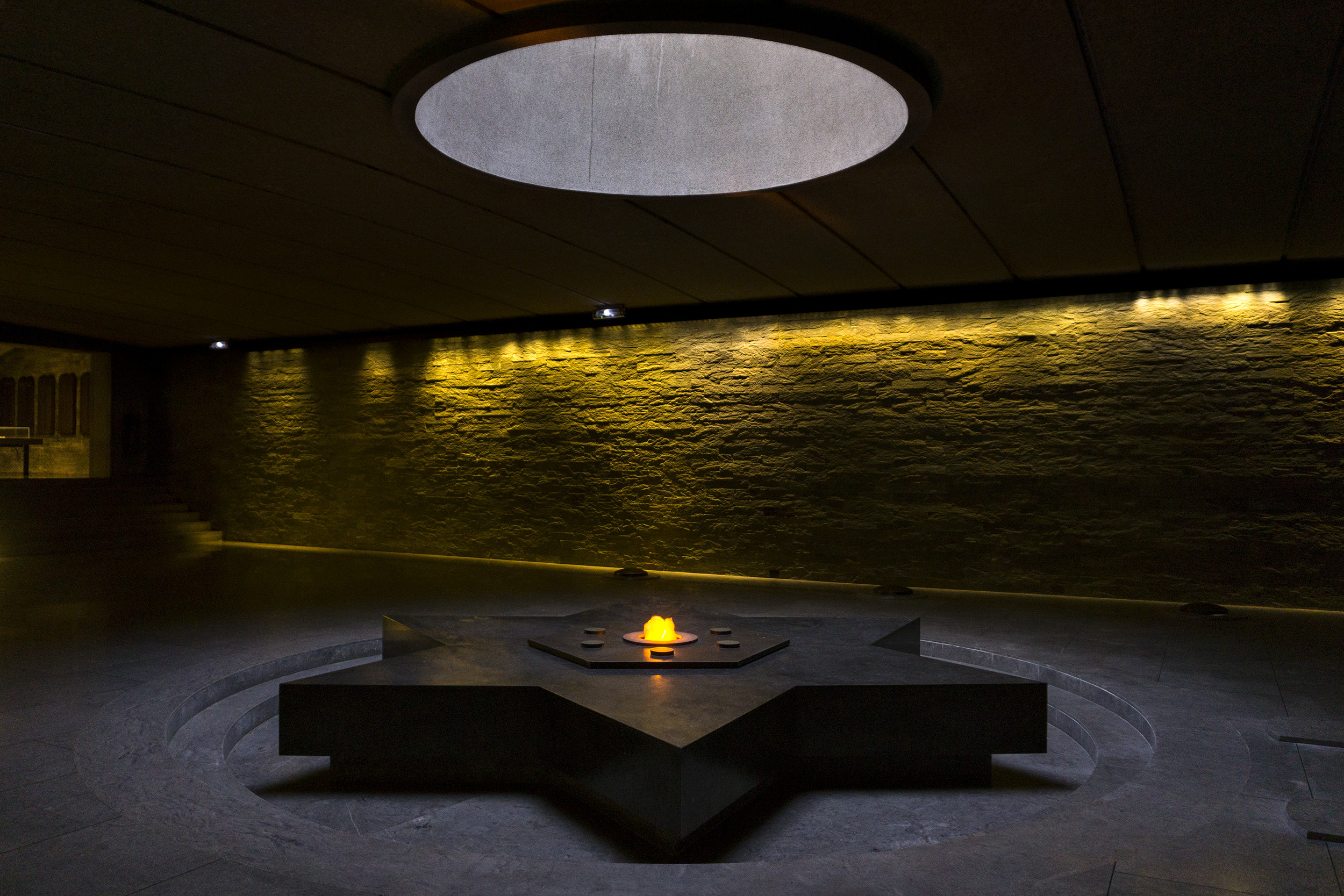
The crypt

The crypt predates the Mémorial de la Shoah; in 1957, the ashes of victims from the different death camps and the Warsaw Ghetto were buried in soil from the land of Israel. A door from the Beaune-la-Rolande internment camp in France faces the tomb.

=== Jewish files ===
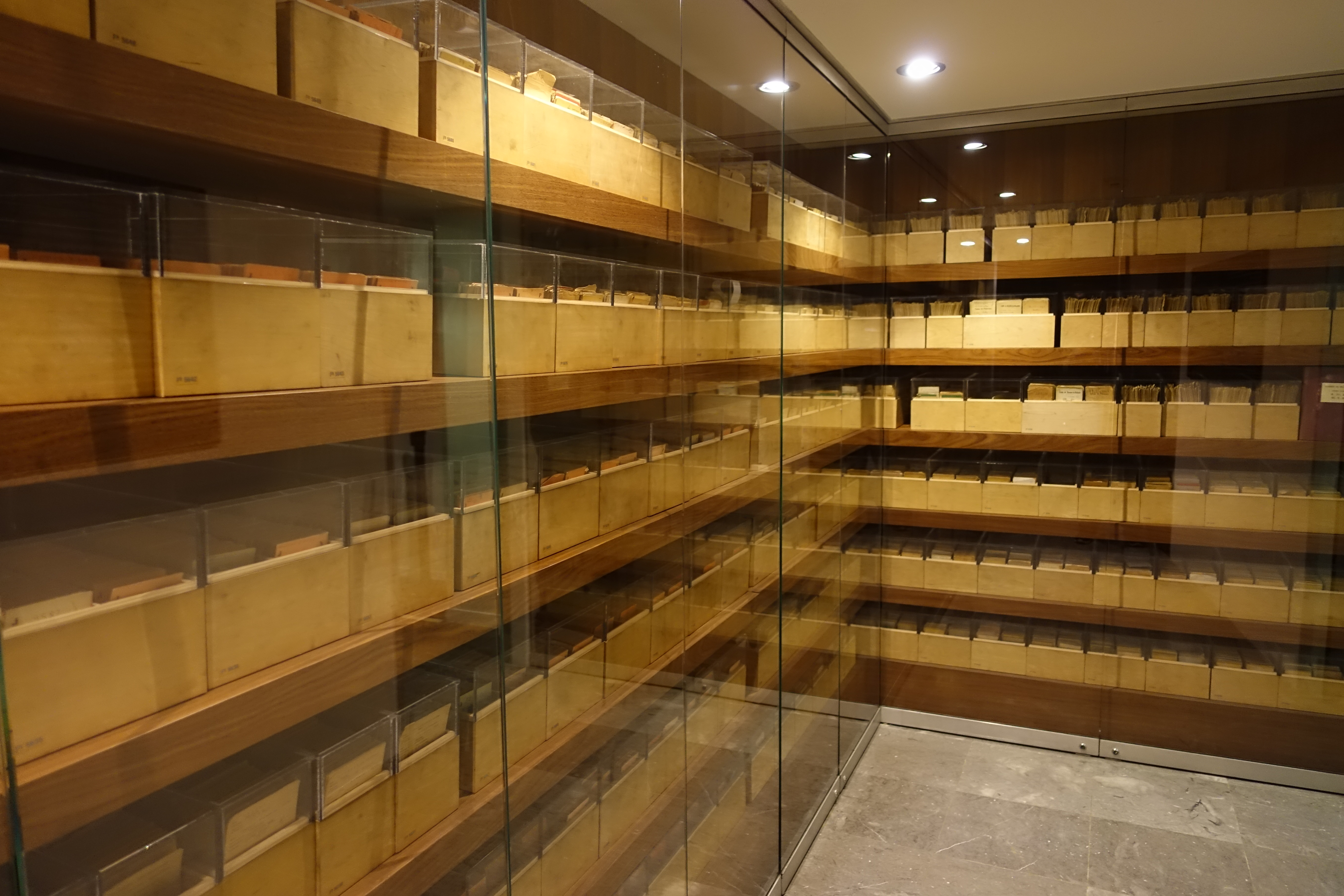
The "Jewish Files"

The Jewish files are located in a small room near the crypt. They were created by the Vichy government to identify Jewish citizens, and were later used by the Nazis to locate Jews for deportation.

=== Exhibit rooms ===
The memorial's permanent exhibit documents the history of French Jews during the Holocaust. The materials on exhibit include photographs, text, and video and audio recordings.

The memorial also includes an auditorium, bookstore, multimedia learning center, documentation center, and the Room of Names (research room).

=== The Wall of the Righteous ===
Since 1963, the Museum Memorial of Yad Vashem (Jerusalem) has awarded the title "Righteous Among the Nations" to non-Jewish people who helped save Jews during the war. As of 2014, this wall lists 3,300 people, either French or acting in France, who have been awarded this title. The wall runs alongside the memorial.

== Vandalism ==
In May 2024, the Wall of the Righteous was vandalised with red hand graffiti. French President Emmanuel Macron condemned the vandalism as "odious anti-Semitism", and Paris authorities filed a criminal complaint. A few suspects were arrested in the case. Investigators were reportedly investigating whether the perpetrators of the vandalism did so at behest of somebody else, perhaps Russian security services.

== Gallery ==
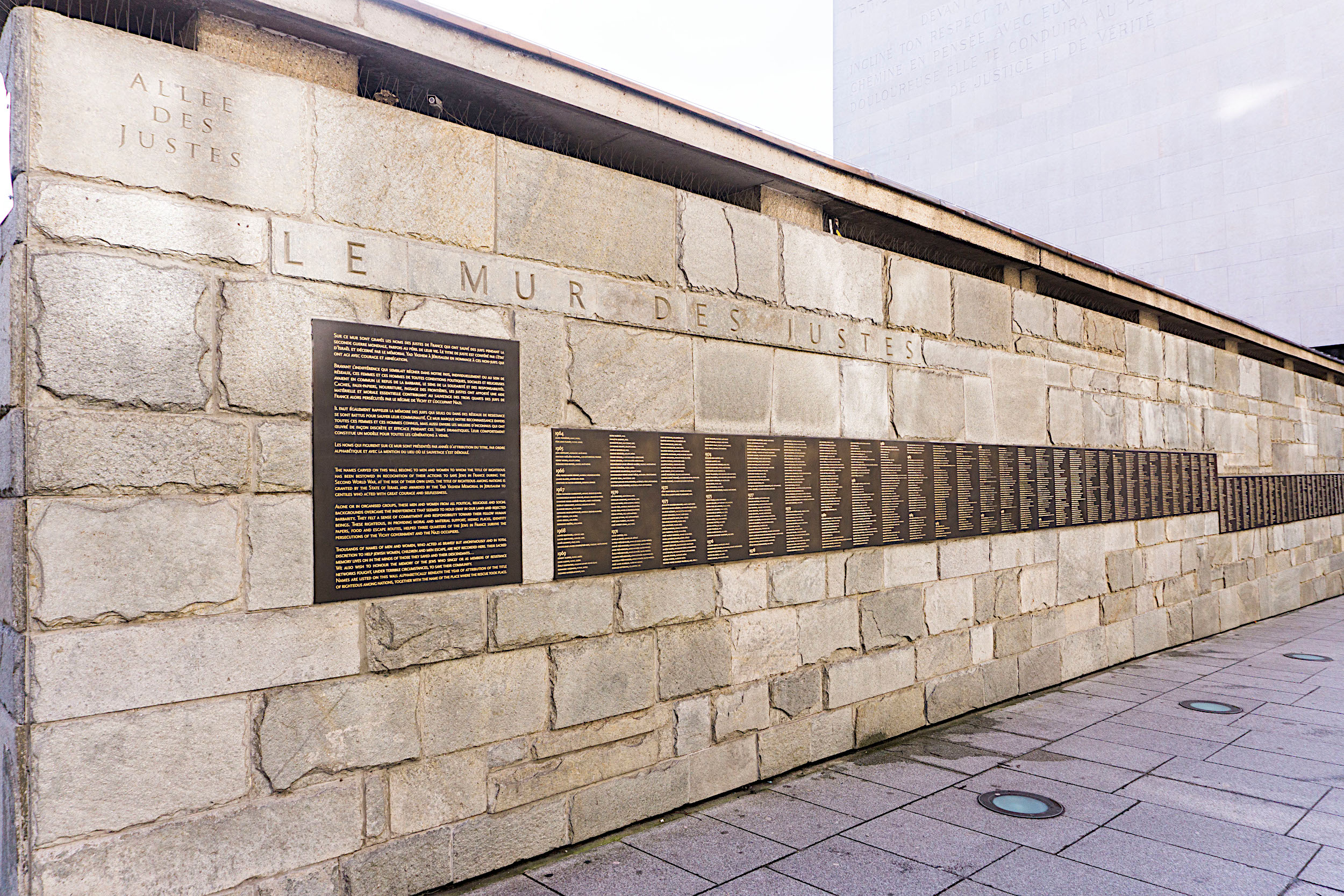
The Wall of the Righteous

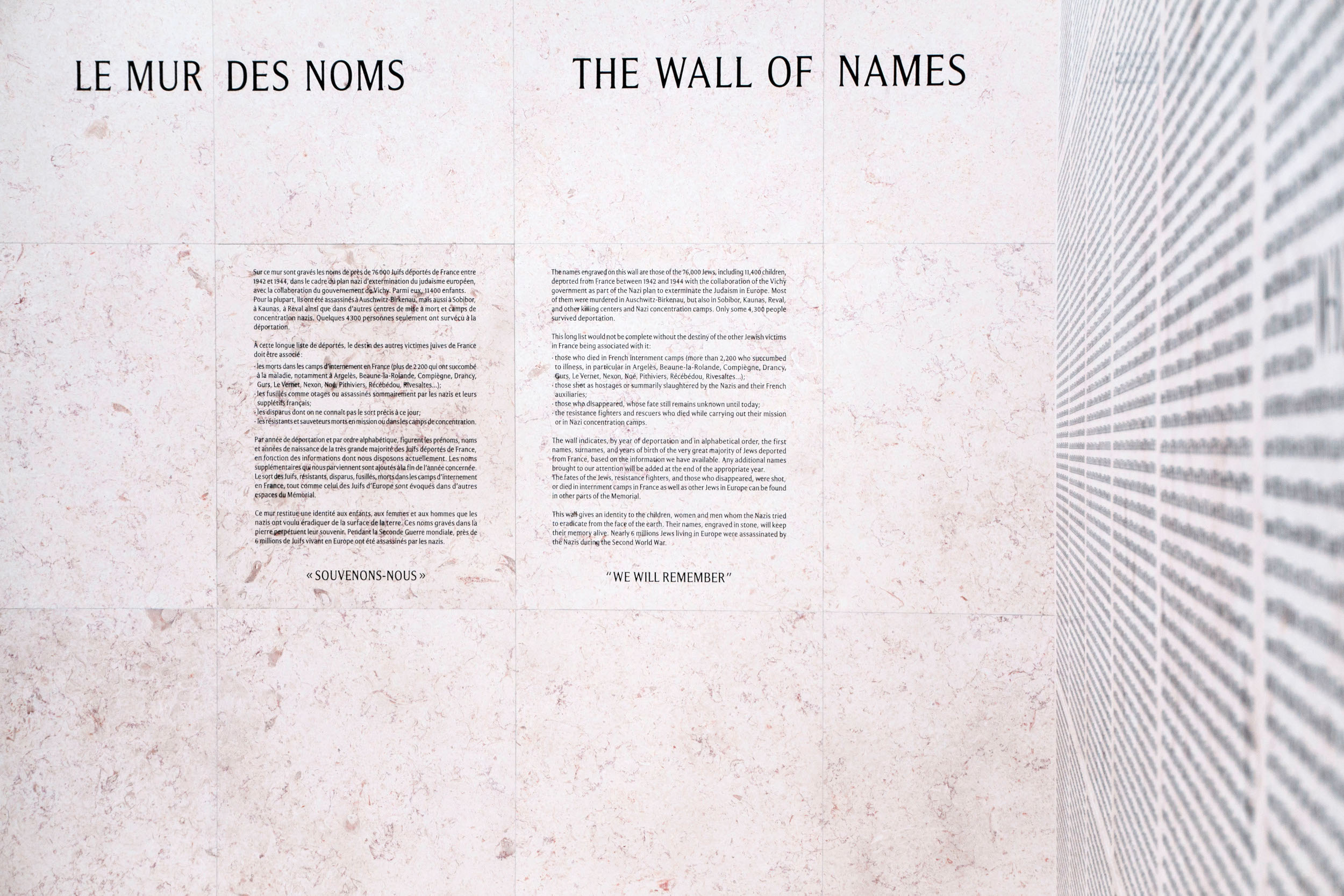
The Wall of Names

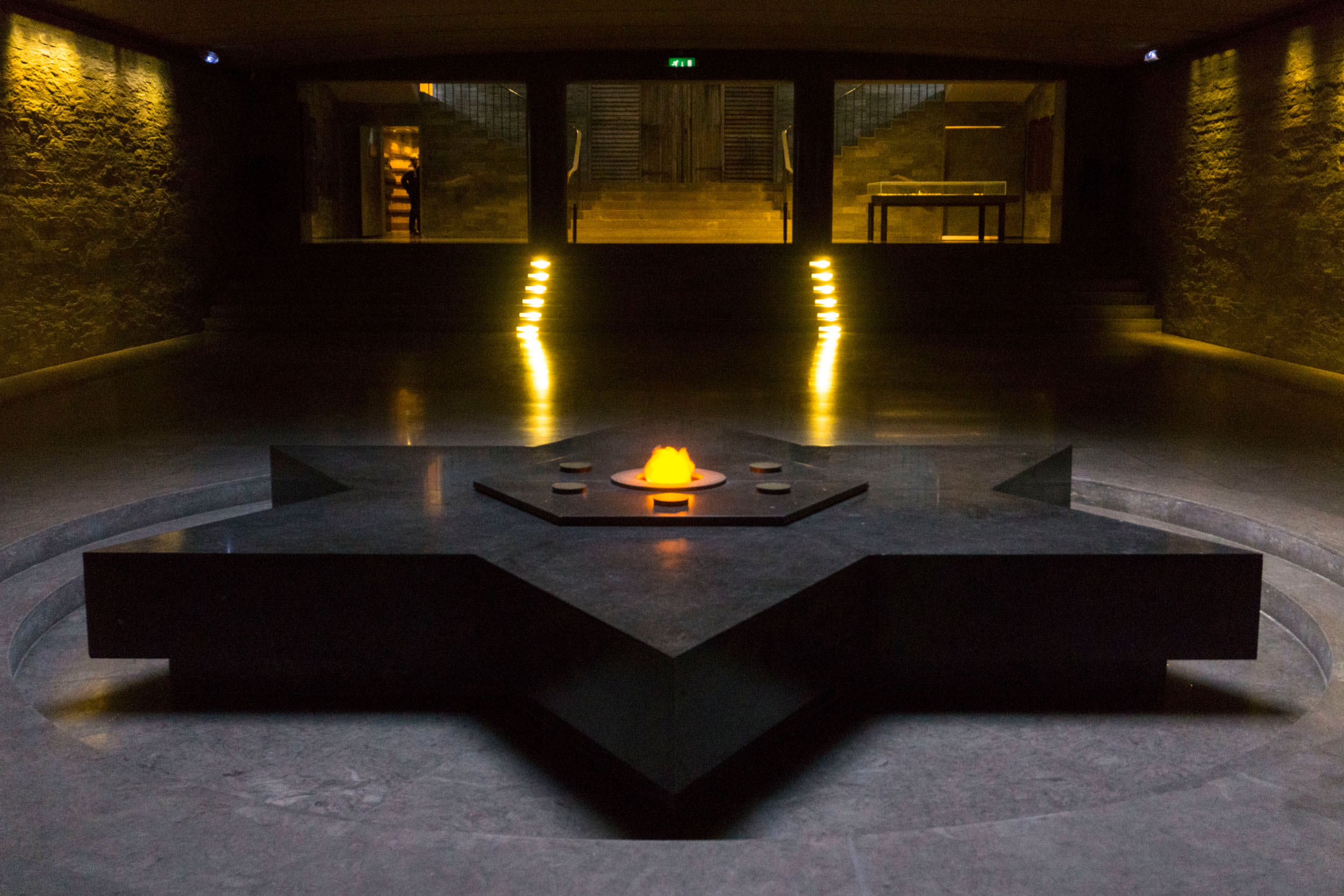
The Crypt

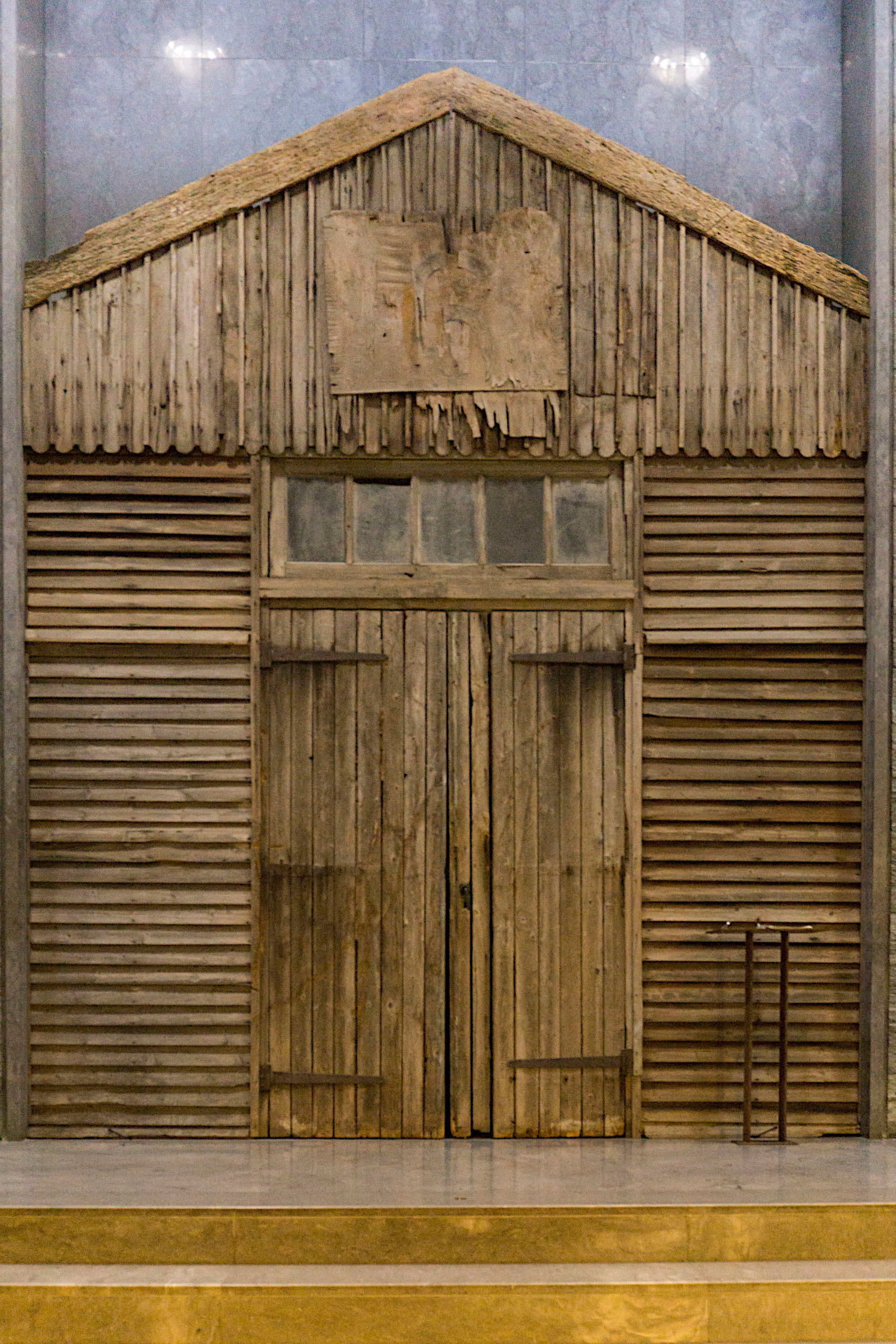
Part of barrack #6 from Beaune-la-Rolande camp

== See also ==
- List of Holocaust memorials and museums in France
- Musée d'art et d'histoire du judaïsme
- History of the Jews in France
