= Vichy France =

Collaborationist regime in France (1940–1944)

French State État français
- 1940–1944
- State Flag Cartouche
- Motto: "Travail, Famille, Patrie" ("Work, Family, Fatherland")
- Anthem: "La Marseillaise" (official) "Maréchal, nous voilà !" (unofficial) ("Marshal, here we are!")
- Emblem of the Head of State

- The French State in 1942: Zone libre; German military occupation zone; French protectorates

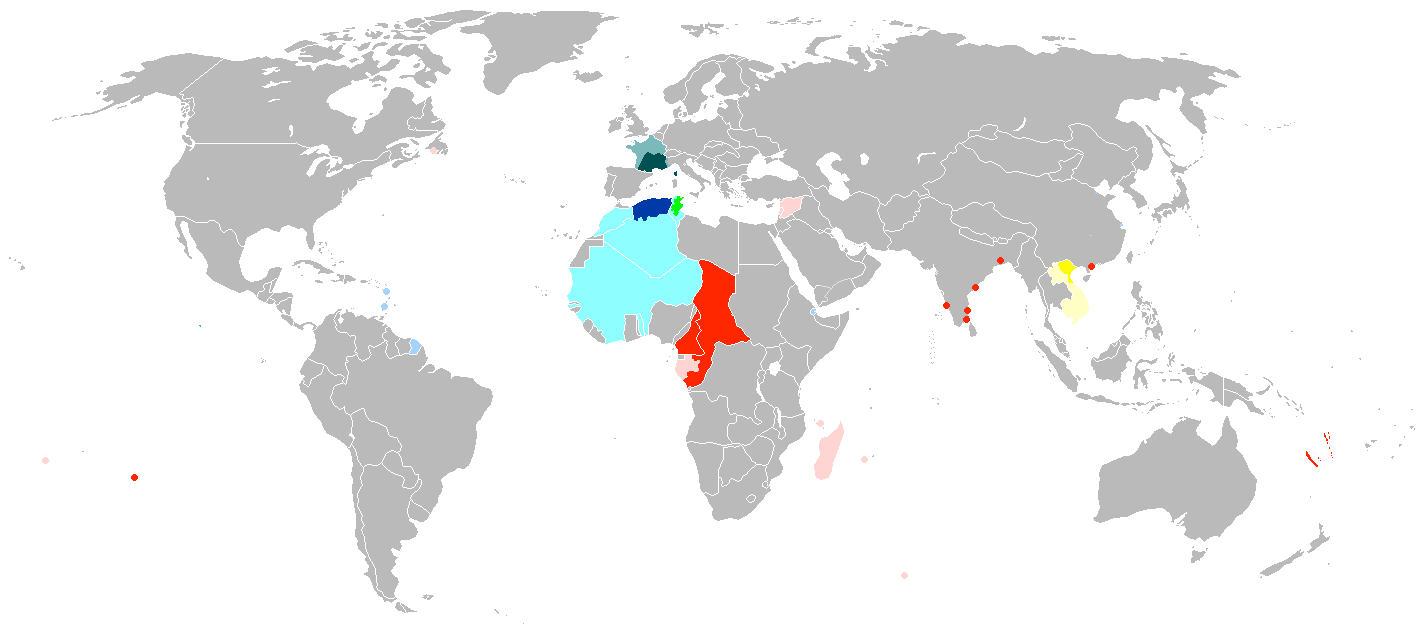
- The gradual loss of all Vichy territory to Japan and Free France as well other Allied powers
- Status: Client state of Nazi Germany under a partial military occupation (1940–1942); Fully occupied puppet state of Nazi Germany and Italy (1942–1943); Puppet state of Nazi Germany (1943–1944); Government-in-exile (1944–1945)
- Capital: Vichy (de facto administrative); Paris (constitutional)
- Capital-in-exile: Sigmaringen, Germany
- Common languages: French
- Demonym: French
- Government: Unitary Pétainist dictatorship
- Head of State
  - 1940–1944: Marshal Philippe Pétain
- Head of Government
  - 1940–1942: Marshal Philippe Pétain
  - 1942–1944: Pierre Laval
- Vice-President of the Council of Ministers
  - 1940: Pierre Laval
  - 1940–1941: P.É. Flandin
  - 1941–1942: François Darlan
- Legislature: National Assembly
- Historical era: World War II
  - Second Compiègne: 22 June 1940
  - Pétain given full powers: 10 July 1940
  - Operation Torch: 8 November 1942
  - Case Anton: 11 November 1942
  - German retreat: Summer 1944
  - Vichy laws repealed: 9 August 1944
  - Capture of the Sigmaringen enclave: 22 April 1945

Area
- 1944 (including colonies): 14,200,000 km^{2} (5,500,000 sq mi)

Population
  - 1944 (including colonies): 200,000,000
- Currency: French franc
Preceded by
French Third; Republic
1940: German military administration
Succeeded by
1942: German military administration
Italian military administration
1944: French Government; Commission for the Defense of National Interests
Provisional Government of the French Republic
Free France
- 1. Paris remained the de jure capital of the French State, although the Vichy government never operated from there.; 2. Although the French Republic's institutions were officially maintained, the word "Republic" never occurred in any official document of the Vichy government.

Vichy France (French: Régime de Vichy, lit. 'Vichy regime'; 10 July 1940 – 9 August 1944), also known as the Pétainist regime (Régime pétainiste) and Pétainist France, officially the French State (État français), was a French rump state headed by Marshal Philippe Pétain during World War II, established as a result of German victory in the Battle of France. It was named after its seat of government, the city of Vichy.

Officially independent, but with half of its territory occupied under the harsh terms of the 1940 armistice with Nazi Germany, it adopted a policy of collaboration. Though Paris was nominally its capital, the government established itself in Vichy in the unoccupied "free zone" (zone libre). The occupation of France by Germany at first affected only the northern and western portions of the country. In November 1942, the Allies occupied French North Africa, and in response, the Germans and Italians occupied the entirety of Metropolitan France, ending any pretense of independence by the Vichy government.

On 10 May 1940, France was invaded by Nazi Germany. Paul Reynaud resigned as Prime Minister rather than sign an armistice, and was replaced by Marshal Philippe Pétain. Shortly thereafter, Pétain signed the Armistice of 22 June 1940. At Vichy, Pétain established an authoritarian dictatorship that reversed many liberal policies, began tight supervision of the economy, and launched an ideological campaign called Révolution nationale. Vichy France exhibited characteristics of fascism, such as political and social engineering institutions and attempts at mass mobilization, totalitarian aspirations in control over the populace, and many similar, loosely related ideologies underpinning the government. However, various historians have rejected its definition as fascist and called it authoritarian conservative instead. The state and tightly controlled media promoted antisemitism and racism, Anglophobia, and, after Operation Barbarossa started in June 1941, anti-Sovietism. The terms of the armistice allowed some degree of independence; France was officially declared a neutral country, and the Vichy government kept the French Navy and the French colonial empire under French control, avoiding full occupation of the country by Germany. Despite heavy pressure, the Vichy government never joined the Axis powers.

In October 1940, during a meeting with Adolf Hitler in Montoire-sur-le-Loir, Pétain officially announced the policy of collaboration with Germany whilst maintaining overall neutrality in the war. The Vichy government believed that with its policy of collaboration, it had extracted significant concessions from Germany and avoided harsh terms in the peace treaty. Germany kept two million French prisoners-of-war and imposed forced labour on young Frenchmen. (The Vichy government tried to negotiate with Germany for the early release of the French prisoners of war.) French soldiers were kept hostage to ensure that Vichy would reduce its military forces and pay a heavy tribute in gold, food, and supplies to Germany. French police were ordered to round up Jews and other "undesirables", and at least 72,500 Jews deported from Vichy France were killed in Nazi concentration camps. Most of these Jews were foreigners; the Jews of French origin numbered about 24,000.

== Terminology ==
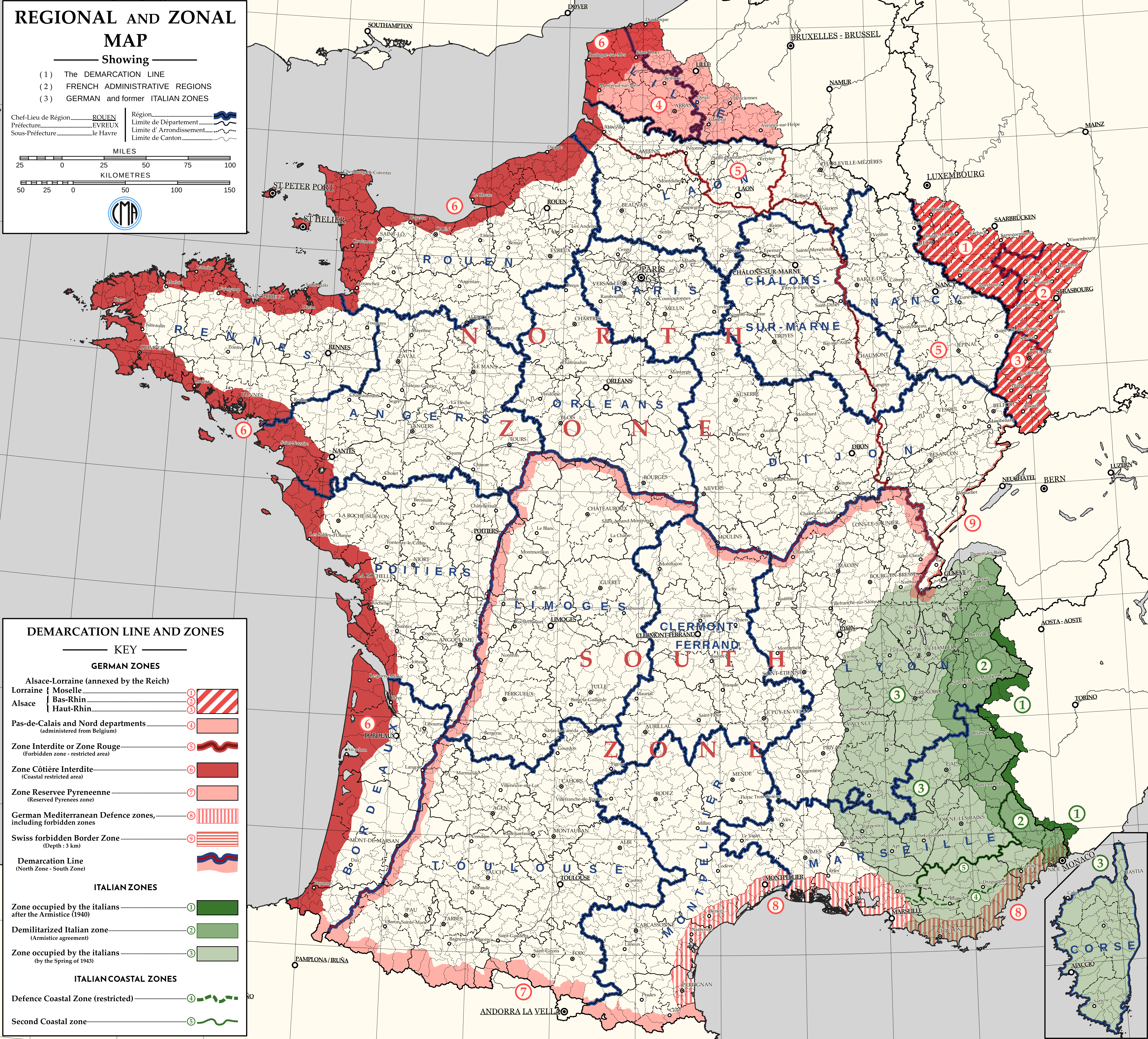
Metropolitan/continental France under German occupation (Germans occupied the southern zone starting in November 1942 – Operation Case Anton). The green zone was under Italian administration.

Personal flag of Marshal Philippe Pétain as Head of State of Vichy France (Chef de l'État Français). The seven stars symbolize his Marshal's rank, and the haft of the labrys is designed like a marshal's baton.

After the National Assembly under the Third Republic voted to give full powers to Pétain on 10 July 1940, the name République française (French Republic) disappeared from all official documents. From then on, the regime was referred to officially as the État Français (French State). Because of its unique situation in the history of France, its contested legitimacy and the generic nature of its official name, the "French State" is most often represented in English by the synonyms "Vichy France"; "Vichy regime"; "government of Vichy"; or, in context, simply "Vichy".

The territory under the control of the French State was based in the city of Vichy, in the unoccupied southern portion of Metropolitan France. This was south of the Line of Demarcation as established by the Armistice of 22 June 1940. It also included the overseas French territories, such as French North Africa, which was "an integral part of Vichy", with antisemitic policies implemented in Vichy France also being implemented there. This was called the Unbesetztes Gebiet (Unoccupied Zone) by the Germans and known as the Zone libre (Free Zone) in France, or less formally as the "Southern Zone" (zone du sud) especially after Operation Anton, the invasion of the Zone libre by German forces in November 1942. Other contemporary colloquial terms for the Zone libre were based on abbreviation and wordplay, such as the "zone nono", for the non-occupied zone.

== Jurisdiction ==
In theory, the civil jurisdiction of the Vichy government extended over most of Metropolitan France, French Algeria, the French protectorate in Morocco, the French protectorate of Tunisia and the rest of the French colonial empire that accepted the authority of Vichy; only the disputed border territory of Alsace-Lorraine was placed under direct German administration. Alsace-Lorraine was officially still part of France, because the Reich never annexed the region. The Reich government at the time was not interested in attempting to enforce piecemeal annexations in the West, although it later annexed Luxembourg; it operated under the assumption that Germany's new western border would be determined in peace negotiations, which would be attended by all the Western Allies and establish a frontier that would be recognized by all the major powers. Since Hitler's overall territorial ambitions were not limited to recovering Alsace-Lorraine, and Britain was never brought to terms, those peace negotiations never took place.

The Nazis had some intention of annexing a large swath of northeastern France, replacing that region's inhabitants with German settlers, and, although it initially forbade French refugees from returning to the region, the restrictions were never thoroughly enforced and were basically abandoned following the invasion of the Soviet Union, which had the effect of turning German territorial ambitions almost exclusively to the East. German troops guarding the boundary line of the northeastern Zone interdite were withdrawn on the night of 17–18 December 1941, but the line remained in place on paper for the remainder of the occupation.

Nevertheless, effectively Alsace-Lorraine was annexed: German law applied to the region, its inhabitants were conscripted into the Wehrmacht and the customs posts separating France from Germany were placed back where they had been between 1871 and 1918. Similarly, a sliver of French territory in the Alps was under direct Italian administration from June 1940 to September 1943. René Bousquet, the head of French police nominated by Vichy, exercised his power in Paris through his second-in-command, Jean Leguay, who coordinated raids with the Nazis. German laws took precedence over French laws in the occupied territories, and the Germans often rode roughshod over the sensibilities of Vichy administrators.

On 11 November 1942, following the landing of the Allies in North Africa (Operation Torch), the Axis launched Operation Anton, occupying southern France and disbanding the strictly limited "Armistice Army" that Vichy had been allowed by the armistice.

== Legitimacy ==
Vichy's claim to be the legitimate French government was denied by Free France and by all subsequent French governments after the war. They maintain that Vichy was an illegal government run by traitors, having come to power through an unconstitutional coup d'état. Pétain was constitutionally appointed prime minister by President Albert Lebrun on 16 June 1940, and he was legally within his powers to sign the armistice with Germany; however, his decision to ask the National Assembly (both chambers) to dissolve itself while granting him dictatorial powers has been more controversial. Historians have particularly debated the circumstances of the vote by the National Assembly of the Third Republic granting full powers to Pétain on 10 July 1940. The main arguments advanced against Vichy's right to incarnate the continuity of the French state were based on the pressure exerted by Pierre Laval, a former prime minister in the Third Republic, on the deputies in Vichy and on the absence of 27 deputies and senators who had fled on the ship Massilia and so could not take part in the vote. However, during the war, the Vichy government was internationally recognized, notably by the United States and several other major Allied powers. Diplomatic relations with the United Kingdom had been severed since 8 July 1940 after the attack on Mers-el-Kébir.

The Vichy regime was initially dominated by the political figure of Laval, who from the beginning sought to increase the regime's collaboration with Nazi Germany, despite France's difficult political and financial situation. Although the war had not caused massive destruction, the armistice of 22 June had agreed that the French government would assume all the costs of maintaining the German occupation troops, which entailed a financial burden of several million French francs a month. In addition, the Third Reich held nearly 1,800,000 French soldiers (including recruits, technicians, and officers) as prisoners of war and refused to repatriate them even though this huge number included workers and peasants who were much needed as labor; the repatriation of these prisoners became necessary months later but was very slow, and by 1945 there were still almost half a million French prisoners living on German soil.

Julian T. Jackson wrote, "There seems little doubt... that at the beginning Vichy was both legal and legitimate". He stated that if legitimacy comes from popular support, Pétain's massive popularity in France until 1942 made his government legitimate, and if legitimacy comes from diplomatic recognition, over 40 countries, including the United States, Canada, and China, recognized the Vichy government. According to Jackson, de Gaulle's Free French acknowledged the weakness of its case against Vichy's legality by citing multiple dates (16 June, 23 June, and 10 July) for the start of Vichy's illegitimate rule, implying that at least for some time, Vichy was still legitimate. In London de Gaulle spoke for "honor and country", instead of the republic. Countries recognized the Vichy government despite de Gaulle's attempts in London to dissuade them; only the German occupation of all of France in November 1942 ended diplomatic recognition. Supporters of Vichy point out that the grant of governmental powers was voted by a joint session of both chambers of the Third Republic Parliament (the Senate and the Chamber of Deputies) in keeping with the constitutional law.

When the Provisional Government enacted the Ordinance of 9 August 1944 during the liberation, it declared all constitutional documents enacted by the regime to be void ab initio, (Note: The Vichy laws were declared void ab initio. The intent was that this was not a repeal, which would have given credence to the fact that Vichy laws once were legitimate, but rather that they were never legal in the first place, therefore never in force.) beginning with the Constitutional Law of 10 July 1940. De Gaulle explicitly refused to declare a new republic, because the republic had never ceased to exist.

== Ideology ==
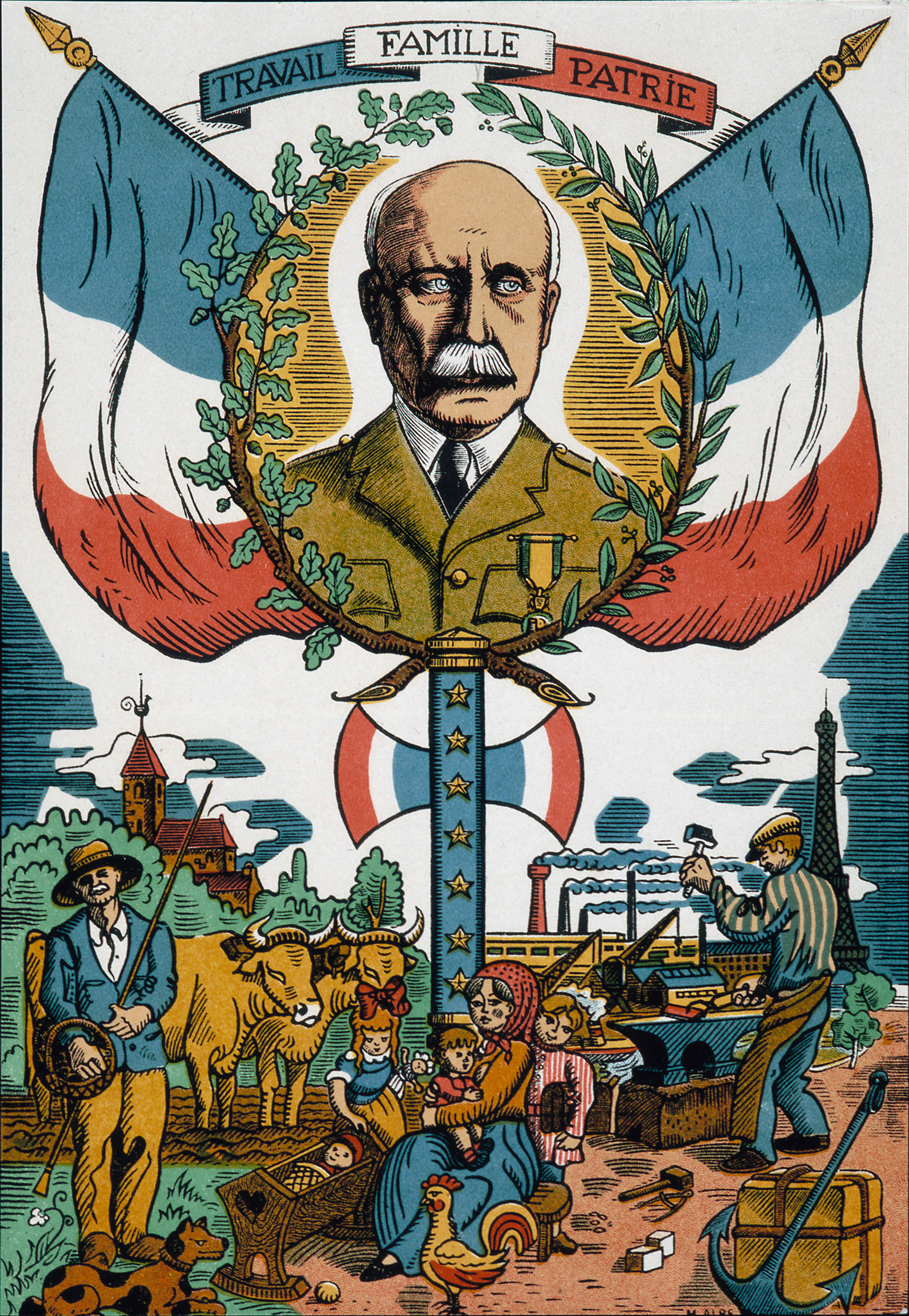
Propaganda poster for the Vichy Regime's Révolution nationale program, 1942

The Vichy regime sought an anti-modern counter-revolution. The traditionalist right in France, with strength in the aristocracy and among Roman Catholics, had never accepted the republican traditions of the French Revolution but demanded a return to traditional lines of culture and religion. It embraced authoritarianism while dismissing democracy. The Vichy regime also framed itself as decisively nationalist. The official name for the ideological program of the Vichy government was Révolution nationale; the ideological underpinning of the regime has also been referred to as Pétainism and Vichyism (Vichyisme).

To advance his message, Pétain frequently spoke on French radio. In his radio speeches, Pétain always used the personal pronoun je (French for the English word "I"), portrayed himself as a Christ-like figure sacrificing himself for France, and assuming a God-like tone of a semi-omniscient narrator who knew truths about the world that the rest of the French did not. To justify the Vichy ideology of the Révolution nationale ("national revolution"), Pétain needed a radical break with the French Third Republic. During his radio speeches, the entire French Third Republic era was always painted in the blackest of colours as a time of décadence ("decadence") when the French people were alleged to have suffered moral degeneration and decline.

Summarizing Pétain's speeches, the British historian Christopher Flood wrote that Pétain blamed la décadence on "political and economic liberalism, with its divisive, individualistic and hedonistic values – locked in sterile rivalry with its antithetical outgrowths, Socialism and Communism". Pétain argued that rescuing the French people from décadence required a period of authoritarian government that would restore national unity and the traditionalist morality, which Pétain claimed the French had forgotten. Despite his highly-negative view of the Third Republic, Pétain argued that la France profonde ("deep France", denoting profoundly French aspects of French culture) still existed, and that the French people needed to return to what Pétain insisted was their true identity. Alongside this claim for a moral revolution was Pétain's call for France to turn inwards and to withdraw from the world, which Pétain always portrayed as a hostile and threatening place full of endless dangers for the French.

Joan of Arc replaced Marianne as the national symbol of France under Vichy, as her status as one of France's best-loved heroines gave her widespread appeal, and the image of Joan as a devout Catholic and patriot also fit well with Vichy's traditionalist message. Vichy literature portrayed Joan as an archetypal virgin and Marianne as an archetypal whore. Under the Vichy regime, the school textbook Miracle de Jeanne by René Jeanneret was required reading, and the anniversary of Joan's death became an occasion for school speeches commemorating her martyrdom. Joan's encounter with angelic voices, according to Catholic tradition, were presented as literal history. The textbook Miracle de Jeanne declared "the Voices did speak!" in contrast with republican school texts, which had strongly implied Joan was mentally ill. Vichy instructors sometimes struggled to square Joan's military heroism with the classical virtues of womanhood, with one school textbook insisting that girls ought not follow Joan's example literally, saying: "Some of the most notable heroes in our history have been women. But nevertheless, girls should preferably exercise the virtues of patience, persistence, and resignation. They are destined to tend to the running of the household ... It is in love that our future mothers will find the strength to practice those virtues which best befit their sex and their condition".

=== Fascism ===
Vichy France was intensely anti-communist; it displayed characteristics of authoritarian conservatism and also of Fascist Italy and Nazi Germany. However, there have been various statements among scholars and researchers on whether the definition "fascist" is applicable to it. Stanley G. Payne found that it was "distinctly rightist and authoritarian but never fascist". Similarly, French historian Olivier Wieviorka rejects the idea that Vichy France was fascist because "Pétain refused to create a single party state, avoided getting France involved in a new war, hated modernization, and supported the Church"; while the political scientist Robert Paxton wrote that genuinely fascist elements had only minor roles in the range of supporters from reactionaries to moderate liberal modernizers; nevertheless, Paxton argued that since fascism and conservatism had much in common, Vichy qualified as fascist. French historian Alain-Gérard Slama argues that Vichy established a specific kind of totalitarian dictatorship which at the same time was not fascist, since it sought "total subordination of civil society to state supervision", but did not "claim to resolve social conflicts, achieve its ends and mobilize the energies of its recruits by using a "scapegoat" and adhered to cultural continuity in contrast to the Fascist "rupture and complete rejection of the past." The proponents of the approach of defining Vichy as authoritarian conservative as opposed to fascist also emphasized the absence of fascist mass mobilization and relative freedom of traditional and economic authorities; the opposing argument is that although the regime did not display the same desire for a mobilized national community as Germany and Italy did, it still had aspirations of mobilization, while in Germany and to a greater extent in Italy, the traditional and economic elites similarly preserved their "latitude".

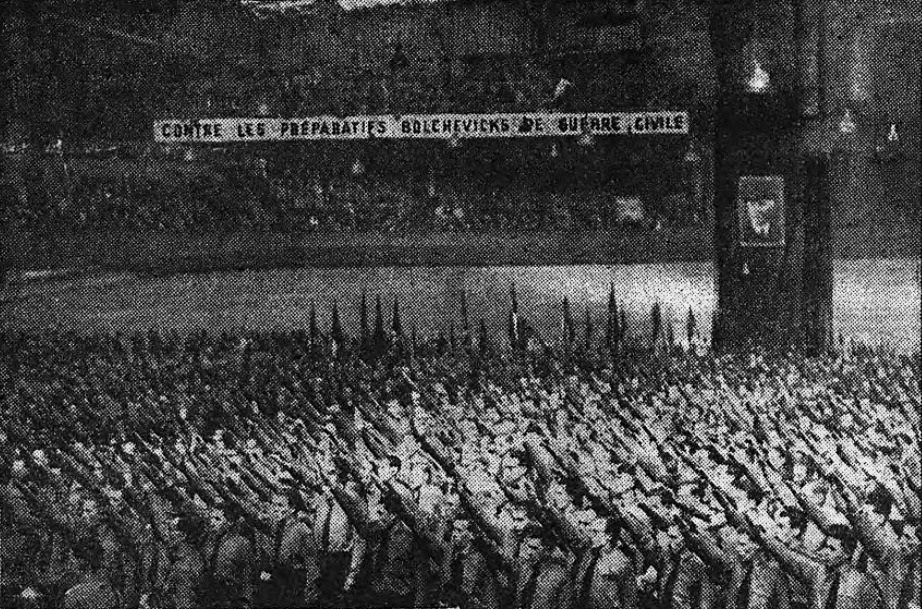
Members of the Milice performing the Roman salute, 1943

According to Roger Austin, "whilst [Vichy's] ideological atmosphere may have betrayed its conservative origins," in its attempts at mass mobilization, surveillance policies and executive repression advanced to fascism more than it may be supposed. Roger Griffin noted the similarities of Vichy with fascist regimes and described it as para-fascist, on the one hand, stemming from not a populist Fascist movement, but a wide spectrum of right-wing opponents of liberalism and socialism among the upper echelons of society, but on the other hand, relying on various fascist-like institutions of social control and engineering (such as the youth organization Compagnons de France), a grassroots organization of mobilization of men (Légion Française des Combattants), paramilitary elite (the Milice) and the secret Service du Contrôle Technique (SCT), designed both to reveal the public opinion of the Pétainist regime and persecute any dissent to it, from public pro-German critics to the listeners of BBC; Martin Blinkhorn calls the activities of the SCT the strongest argument in defining Vichy France as a totalitarian regime. The historian Zeev Sternhell described Vichy France as "totalitarian" and "no less fascist than Mussolini's Italy," with a racial legislation harsher than the one of Italy and even the Nuremberg Laws, and the ideology of the regime, determined not only to dismantle the intstitutions of democracy, "but to kill its spirit," as grounded in the traditions of the "war" of the French "revolutionary right" against "liberalism, democracy and socialism", and in terms of philosophy, against the Enlightenment. Some proponents of the definition of Vichy as fascist put an emphasis on the last two years of the regime marked by the organization of the Milice, fascist by its ideology. The historian H. R. Kedward wrote: "Much of Vichy's ideology, it is often argued, was of a traditional, right-wing, nationalist nature, harking back to a pre-Revolutionary, rural age, with the accent on hierarchy and provincial values, and this competed with the technocratic modernism of some of its ministries. And yet it is this very synthesis of opposites, a familiar characteristic of fascist regimes, which suggests that Vichy, at least in its last two repressive years, was indeed a variant of fascism."

The Vichy government tried to assert its legitimacy by symbolically connecting itself with the Gallo-Roman period of France's history, and celebrated the Gaulish chieftain Vercingetorix as the "founder" of the French nation. It was asserted that just as the defeat of the Gauls in the Battle of Alesia (52 BCE) had been the moment in French history when a sense of common nationhood was born, the defeat of 1940 would again unify the nation. The Vichy government's "francisque" insignia featured two symbols from the Gallic period: the baton and the double-headed hatchet (labrys) arranged to resemble the fasces, the symbol of the Italian Fascists.

=== Anglophobia ===
The key component of Vichy's ideology was Anglophobia. In part, Vichy's virulent Anglophobia was due to its leaders' personal dislike of the British, as Marshal Pétain, Pierre Laval and Admiral François Darlan were all Anglophobes. As early as February 1936, Pétain had told the Italian Ambassador to France that "England has always been France's most implacable enemy" and went on to say that France had "two hereditary enemies", namely Germany and Britain, with the latter being easily the more dangerous of the two; and he wanted a Franco-German-Italian alliance that would partition the British Empire, an event that Pétain claimed would solve all the economic problems caused by the Great Depression. Beyond that, to justify both the armistice with Germany and the Révolution nationale, Vichy needed to portray the French declaration of war on Germany as a hideous mistake and the French society under the Third Republic as degenerate and rotten. The Révolution nationale together with Pétain's policy of la France seule ("France alone") were meant to "regenerate" France from la décadence, which was said to have destroyed French society and to have brought about the defeat of 1940. Such a harsh critique of French society could generate only so much support, and as such, Vichy blamed French problems on various "enemies" of France, the chief of which was Britain, the "eternal enemy" that had supposedly conspired via Masonic lodges to weaken France and then to pressure France into declaring war on Germany in 1939.

No other nation was attacked as frequently and violently as Britain was in Vichy propaganda. In Pétain's radio speeches, Britain was always portrayed as the "Other", a nation that was the complete antithesis of everything good in France, the blood-soaked "Perfidious Albion" and the relentless "eternal enemy" of France whose ruthlessness knew no bounds. Joan of Arc, who had fought against England, was made into the symbol of France partly for that reason. The chief themes of Vichy Anglophobia were British "selfishness" in using and then abandoning France after instigating wars, British "treachery" and British plans to take over French colonies. The three examples that were used to illustrate these themes were the Dunkirk evacuation in May 1940, the Royal Navy attack at Mers-el-Kébir on the French Mediterranean fleet that killed over 1,300 French sailors in July 1940 and the failed Anglo-Free French attempt to seize Dakar in September 1940. Typical of Vichy anti-British propaganda was the widely distributed pamphlet published in August 1940 and written by self-proclaimed "professional Anglophobe" Henri Béraud entitled, Faut-il réduire l'Angleterre en esclavage? ("Should England Be Reduced to Slavery?"); the question in the title was merely rhetorical. Additionally, Vichy mixed Anglophobia with racism and anti-Semitism to portray the British as a racially degenerate "mixed race" working for Jewish capitalists, in contrast to the "racially pure" peoples on the continent of Europe who were building a "New Order". In an interview conducted by Béraud with Admiral Darlan published in Gringoire newspaper in 1941, Darlan was quoted as saying that if the "New Order" failed in Europe, it would mean "here in France, the return to power of the Jews and Freemasons subservient to Anglo-Saxon policy".

== Fall of France and establishment of the Vichy government ==
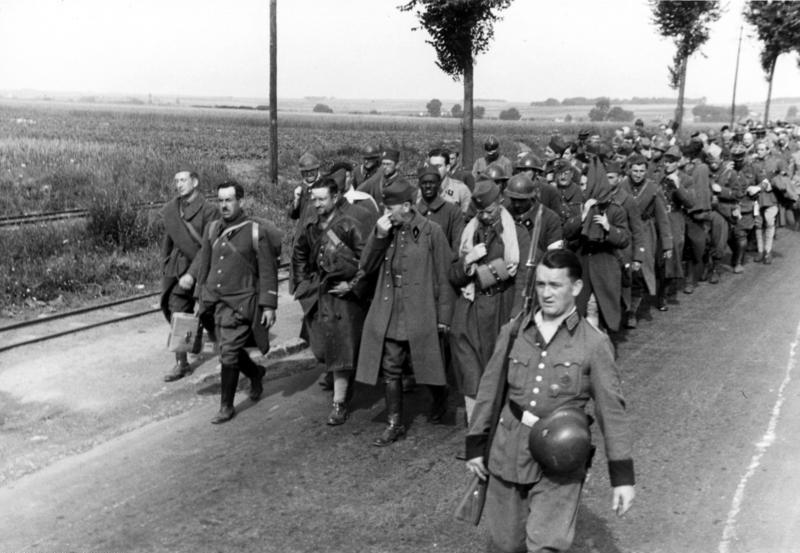
French prisoners of war are marched off under German guard, 1940

France declared war on Germany on 3 September 1939 after the German invasion of Poland on 1 September. After the eight-month Phoney War, the Germans launched their offensive in the West on 10 May 1940. Within days, it became clear that French military forces were overwhelmed and that military collapse was imminent. Government and military leaders, deeply shocked by the debacle, debated how to proceed. Many officials, including Prime Minister Paul Reynaud, wanted to move the government to French territories in North Africa and to continue the war with the French Navy and colonial resources. Others, particularly Vice-Premier Philippe Pétain and Commander-in-Chief General Maxime Weygand, insisted that the responsibility of the government was to remain in France and share the misfortune of its people; they called for an immediate cessation of hostilities.

While the debate continued, the government was forced to relocate several times to avoid capture by advancing German forces and finally reached Bordeaux. Communications were poor, and thousands of civilian refugees clogged the roads. In those chaotic conditions, advocates of an armistice gained the upper hand. The Cabinet agreed on a proposal to seek armistice terms from Germany with the understanding that if Germany set forth dishonourable or excessively harsh terms, France would retain the option to continue to fight. General Charles Huntziger, who headed the French armistice delegation, was told to break off negotiations if the Germans demanded the occupation of all of Metropolitan France, the French fleet, or any of the French overseas territories. The Germans did not, however, make any of those demands.

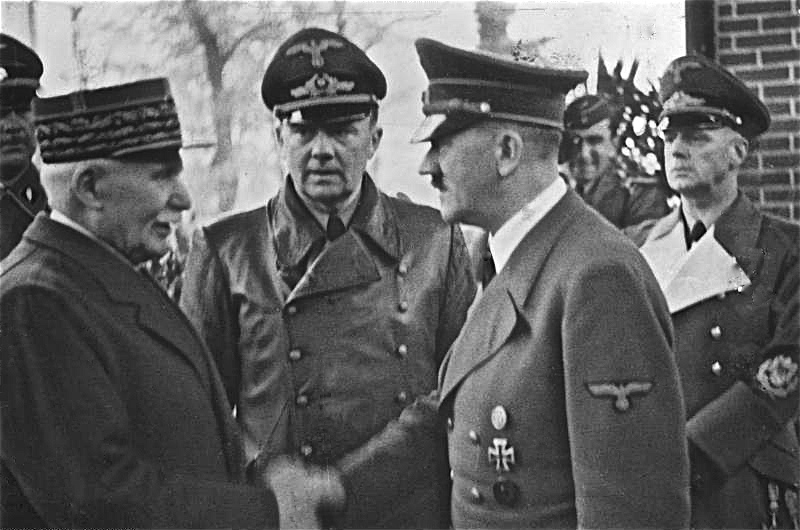
Pétain meeting Hitler in October 1940

Prime Minister Reynaud favoured continuing the war but was soon outvoted by those who advocated an armistice. Facing an untenable situation, Reynaud resigned, and, on his recommendation, President Albert Lebrun appointed the 84-year-old Pétain as the new prime minister on 16 June 1940. The armistice with Germany was signed on 22 June 1940. A separate French agreement was reached with Italy, which had entered the war against France on 10 June, well after the outcome of the battle had been decided.

Adolf Hitler had a number of reasons for agreeing to an armistice. He wanted to ensure that France did not continue to fight from North Africa and that the French Navy was taken out of the war. In addition, leaving a French government in place would relieve Germany of the considerable burden of administering French territory, particularly as Hitler turned his attention toward Britain, which had retreated from France but fought on against Germany. Finally, as Germany lacked a navy sufficient to occupy France's overseas territories, Hitler's only practical recourse to deny the British the use of those territories was to maintain France's status as a de jure independent and neutral nation and to send a message to Britain that it was alone, with France appearing to switch sides and the United States remaining neutral. However, German espionage against France after its defeat intensified greatly, particularly in southern France.

In order to maintain the appearance of an "autonomous" government, Laval decided to establish the administrative headquarters of the collaborationist government in a large city in unoccupied France, but this was not possible due to security issues and German pressure, so over the months it was tacitly decided that Vichy was the seat of government in practice, although it was never officially declared the "capital". Vichy is one of the 4 sub-prefectures of the department of Allier, located in the centre of France, north of the Auvergne region in the heart of the former "province of Bourbonnais", birthplace of the Bourbons, and 55 km from Clermont-Ferrand, the capital of the region. It was already then a small tourist town, whose thermal springs were much visited, and with many hotels and summer houses, as well as telephone and telegraph lines that easily connected it to the rest of France. For these reasons, in the summer of 1940, Laval chose Vichy as the temporary seat of the new government, since Bordeaux was a port on the Atlantic coast that would be subject to the direct administration of the Wehrmacht, while Lyon (the other major city in the free zone) was a traditional seat of the French socialists and potentially hostile to the new government; the large hotels of Vichy were requisitioned to house administrative entities of the new regime.

=== Conditions of armistice ===
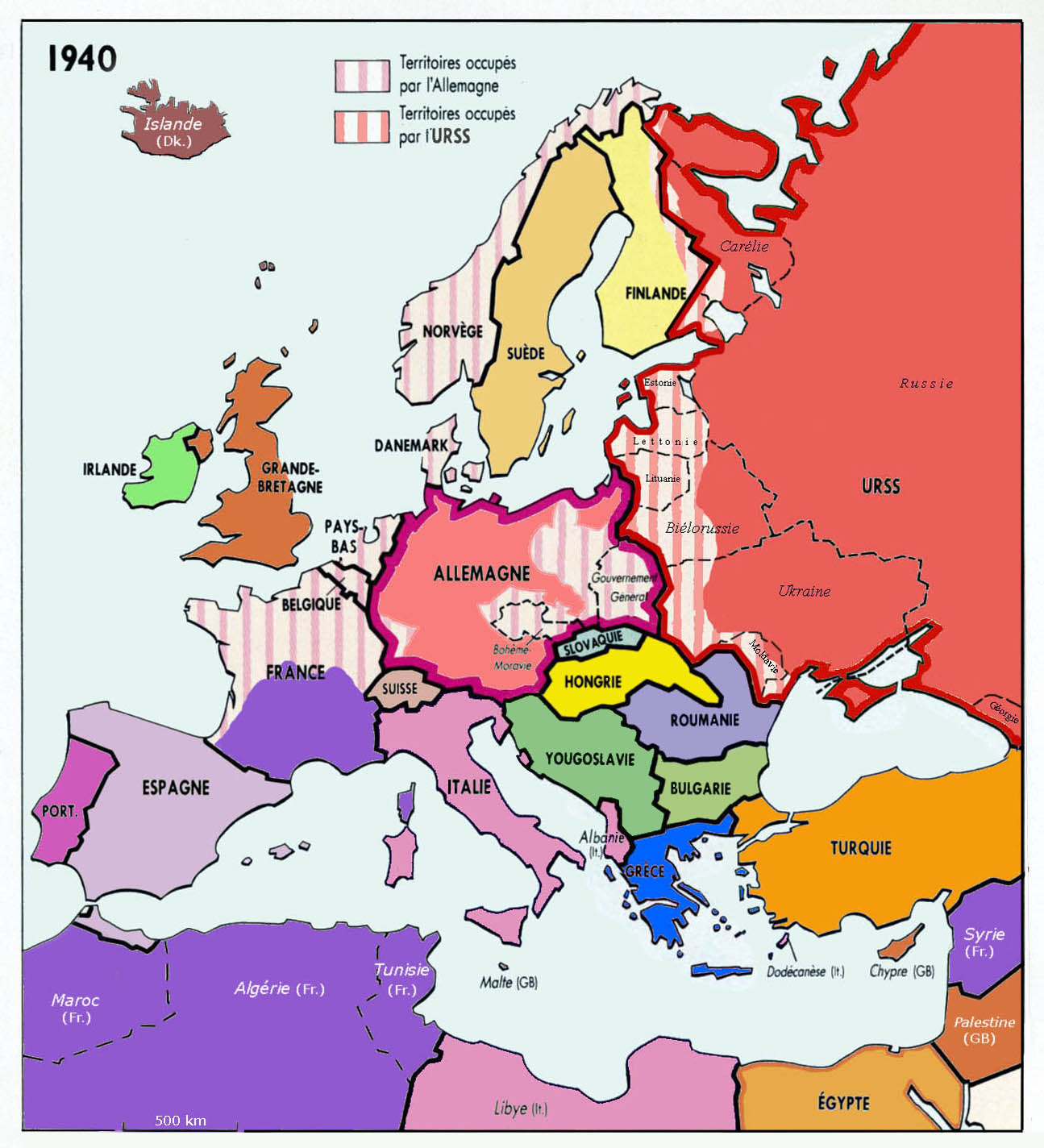
The division of France

As per the terms of the Franco-German armistice of 22 June 1940, Nazi Germany effectively annexed the provinces of Alsace and Lorraine while the German army occupied northern metropolitan France and all the Atlantic coastline down to the border with Spain. That left the rest of France, including the remaining two-fifths of southern and eastern metropolitan France and Overseas French North Africa, unoccupied and under the control of a collaborationist French government based at the city of Vichy, headed by Marshal Philippe Pétain. Ostensibly, the Vichy French government administered the whole of France (excluding Alsace-Lorraine), including Overseas Vichy France and North Africa.

==== Prisoners ====
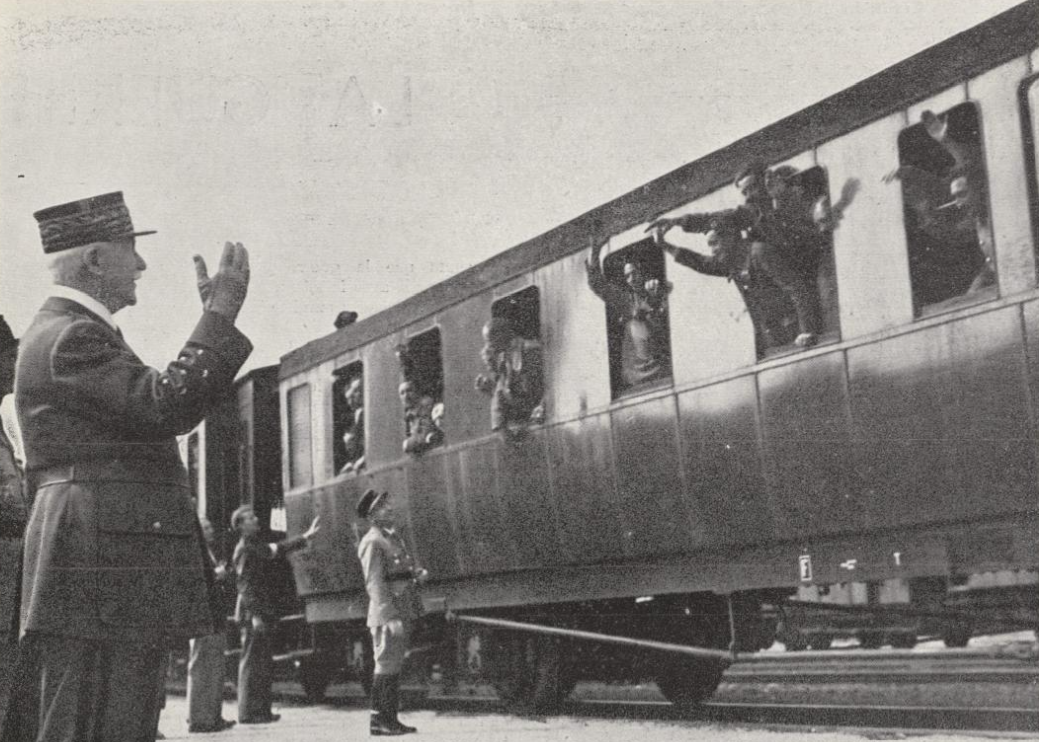
Pétain greeting a train of repatriated prisoners-of-war

Germany took two million French soldiers as prisoners-of-war and sent them to camps in Germany. About a third had been released on various terms by 1944. Of the remainder, the officers and NCOs (corporals and sergeants) were kept in camps but were exempt from forced labour. The privates were first sent to "Stalag" camps for processing and were then put to work. About half of them worked in German agriculture, where food rations were adequate and controls were lenient. The others worked in factories or mines, where conditions were much harsher.

==== Armistice Army ====
The French government had responsibility for preventing French citizens from escaping into exile.

Article IV of the Armistice allowed for a small French army – the Armistice Army (Armée de l'Armistice) – stationed in the unoccupied zone, and for the military provision of the French colonial empire overseas. The function of those forces was to keep internal order and to defend French territories from Allied assault. The French forces were to remain under the overall direction of the German armed forces.

The exact strength of the Vichy French Metropolitan Army was set at 3,768 officers, 15,072 non-commissioned officers, and 75,360 men. All members had to be volunteers. In addition to the army, the size of the Gendarmerie was fixed at 60,000 men plus an anti-aircraft force of 10,000 men. Despite the influx of trained soldiers from the colonial forces (reduced in size in accordance with the armistice), there was a shortage of volunteers. As a result, 30,000 men of the class of 1939 were retained to fill the quota. In early 1942 those conscripts were released, but there were still not enough men. That shortage remained until the regime's dissolution, despite Vichy appeals to the Germans for a regular form of conscription.

The Vichy French Metropolitan Army was deprived of tanks and other armoured vehicles and was desperately short of motorized transport, a particular problem for cavalry units. Surviving recruiting posters stress the opportunities for athletic activities, including horsemanship, reflecting both the general emphasis placed by the Vichy government on rural virtues and outdoor activities and the realities of service in a small and technologically backward military force. Traditional features characteristic of the pre-1940 French Army, such as kepis and heavy capotes (buttoned-back greatcoats), were replaced by berets and simplified uniforms.

The Vichy authorities did not deploy the Army of the Armistice against resistance groups active in the south of France, reserving that role to the Vichy Milice (militia), a paramilitary force created on 30 January 1943 by the Vichy government to combat the Resistance. Members of the regular army could thus defect to the Maquis after the German occupation of southern France and the disbandment of the Army of the Armistice in November 1942. By contrast, the Milice continued to collaborate, and its members were subject to reprisals after the Liberation.

Vichy French colonial forces were reduced in accordance with the terms of the armistice, but in the Mediterranean area alone, Vichy still had nearly 150,000 men under arms. There were about 55,000 in French Morocco, 50,000 in Algeria, and almost 40,000 in the Army of the Levant (Armée du Levant), in Lebanon and Syria. Colonial forces were allowed to keep some armoured vehicles, though these were mostly "vintage" World War I tanks (Renault FT).

==== German custody ====
The Armistice required France to turn over any German citizens within the country upon German demand. The French regarded this as a "dishonourable" term since it would require France to hand over persons who had entered France seeking refuge from Germany. Attempts to negotiate the point with Germany proved unsuccessful, and the French decided not to press the issue to the point of refusing the Armistice.

=== 10 July 1940 vote of full powers ===
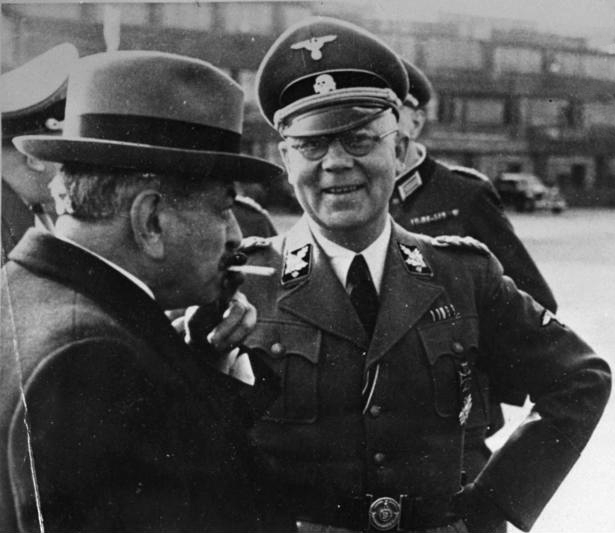
Pierre Laval with the head of German police units in France, SS-Gruppenführer Carl Oberg

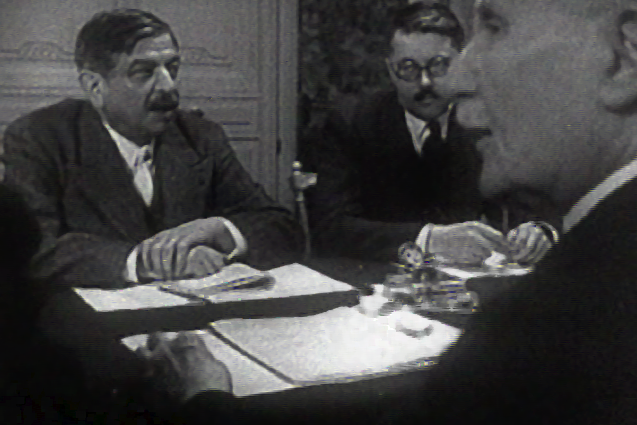
Pierre Laval and Philippe Pétain in the Frank Capra documentary film Divide and Conquer (1943)

On 10 July 1940, the Chamber of Deputies and the Senate gathered in joint session in the quiet spa town of Vichy, their provisional capital in central France. Lyon, France's second-largest city, would have been a more logical choice but Mayor Édouard Herriot was too associated with the Third Republic. Marseille had a reputation as an organized crime hub. Toulouse was too remote and had a left-wing reputation. Vichy was centrally located and had many hotels for ministers to use.

Pierre Laval and Raphaël Alibert began their campaign to convince the assembled senators and deputies to vote full powers to Pétain. They used every means available, such as promising ministerial posts to some and threatening and intimidating others. They were aided by the absence of popular, charismatic figures who might have opposed them, such as Georges Mandel and Édouard Daladier, who were then aboard the ship Massilia on their way to North Africa and exile. On 10 July the National Assembly, comprising both the Senate and the Chamber of Deputies, voted by 569 votes to 80, with 20 voluntary abstentions, to grant full and extraordinary powers to Pétain. By the same vote, they also granted him the power to write a new constitution. (Note: Given full constituent powers in the law of 10 July 1940, Pétain never promulgated a new constitution. A draft was written in 1941 and signed by Pétain in 1944 but was never submitted or ratified.) By Act No. 2 on the following day, Pétain defined his own powers and abrogated any Third Republic laws that were in conflict with them. (These acts would later be annulled in August 1944.)

Most legislators believed that democracy would continue, albeit with a new constitution. Although Laval said on 6 July that "parliamentary democracy has lost the war; it must disappear, ceding its place to an authoritarian, hierarchical, national and social regime", the majority trusted Pétain. Léon Blum, who voted no, wrote three months later that Laval's "obvious objective was to cut all the roots that bound France to its republican and revolutionary past. His 'national revolution' was to be a counter-revolution eliminating all the progress and human rights won in the last one hundred and fifty years". The minority of mostly Radicals and Socialists who opposed Laval became known as the Vichy 80. The deputies and senators who voted to grant full powers to Pétain were condemned on an individual basis after the Liberation.

The majority of French historians and all postwar French governments have contended that this vote by the National Assembly was illegal. Three main arguments are put forward:

- Abrogation of legal procedure
- The impossibility for Parliament to delegate its constitutional powers without controlling their use a posteriori.
- The 1884 constitutional amendment making it unconstitutional to put into question the "republican form" of the government.

Out of a total of 544 Deputies, only 414 voted; and out of a total of 302 senators, only 235 voted. Of these, 357 deputies voted in favour of Pétain and 57 against, while 212 senators voted for Pétain, and 23 against. Thus, Pétain was approved by 65% of all deputies and 70% of all senators. Although Pétain could claim legality for himself, particularly in comparison with the essentially self-appointed leadership of Charles de Gaulle, the dubious circumstances of the vote explain why most French historians do not consider Vichy a complete continuity of the French state.

The text voted by the Congress stated:

The National Assembly gives full powers to the government of the Republic, under the authority and the signature of Marshal Pétain, to the effect of promulgating by one or several acts a new constitution of the French state. This constitution must guarantee the rights of labour, of family and of the homeland. It will be ratified by the nation and applied by the assemblies which it has created.

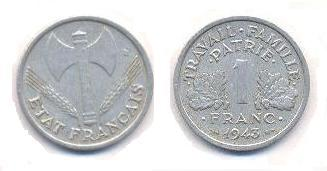
1943 1 Franc coin. Front: "French State". Back: "Work Family Homeland". Symbolism on coinage was a propaganda vehicle.

Jackson wrote, "The Republic was never formally abolished, but it surreptitiously disappeared, just as it had been born surreptitiously in 1875" by the French constitutional laws of 1875. The Constitutional Acts of 11 and 12 July 1940 granted to Pétain all powers (legislative, judicial, administrative, executive and diplomatic) and the title of "head of the French state" (chef de l'État français), as well as the right to nominate his successor. On 12 July, Pétain designated Laval as vice-president and his designated successor and appointed Fernand de Brinon as representative to the German High Command in Paris. Pétain remained the head of the Vichy regime until 20 August 1944. The French national motto, Liberté, Egalité, Fraternité (Freedom, Equality, Brotherhood) was replaced by Travail, Famille, Patrie (Work, Family, Homeland). It was noted at the time that TFP also stood for the criminal punishment of travaux forcés à perpetuité ("forced labor in perpetuity"). Reynaud was arrested in September 1940 by the Vichy government and sentenced to life imprisonment in 1941, before the opening of the Riom Trial.

Pétain was a reactionary by nature and education, despite his status as a hero of the Third Republic during World War I. Almost as soon as he was granted full powers, Pétain began blaming the Third Republic's democracy and endemic corruption for France's humiliating defeat by Germany. Accordingly, his government soon began taking on authoritarian characteristics. Democratic liberties and guarantees were immediately suspended. The "crime of opinion" (délit d'opinion) was reestablished, effectively repealing freedom of thought and expression, and critics were frequently arrested. Elective bodies were replaced by nominated ones. The "municipalities" and the departmental commissions were thus placed under the authority of the administration and of the prefects (nominated by and dependent on the executive power). In January 1941, the National Council (Conseil National), composed of notables from the countryside and the provinces, was instituted under the same conditions. Despite the clear authoritarian cast of Pétain's government, he did not formally institute a one-party state, maintained the Tricolor and other symbols of republican France and, unlike many on the far right, was not an anti-Dreyfusard. Pétain excluded fascists from office in his government, and by and large, his cabinet comprised "February 6 men" (members of the "National Union government" formed after the 6 February 1934 crisis after the Stavisky Affair) and mainstream politicians whose career prospects had been blocked by the triumph of the Popular Front in 1936.

== Governments ==
There were five governments during the tenure of the Vichy regime, starting with the continuation of Pétain's position from the Third Republic, which dissolved itself and handed him full powers, leaving Pétain in absolute control of the new, "French State" as Pétain named it. Pierre Laval formed the first government in 1940. The second government was formed by Pierre-Étienne Flandin, and lasted just two months until February 1941. François Darlan was then head of government until April 1942, followed by Pierre Laval again until August 1944. The Vichy government fled into exile in Sigmaringen in September 1944.

== Foreign relations ==
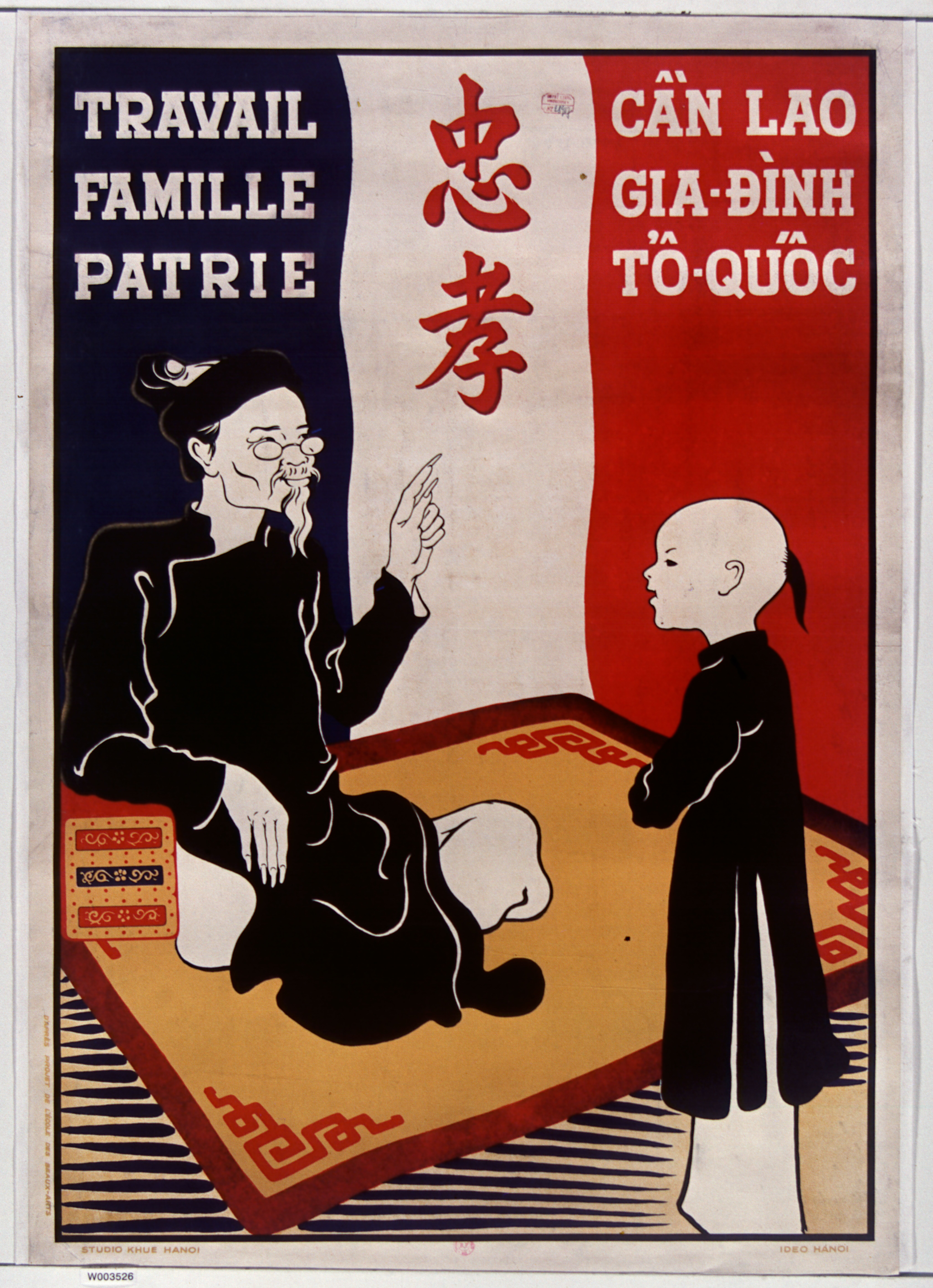
A trilingual Vichy propaganda poster, distributed in French Indochina

Vichy France in 1940–1942 was recognized by most Axis and neutral powers, as well as the United States and the Soviet Union. During the war, Vichy France conducted military actions against armed incursions from Axis and Allied belligerents and was an example of armed neutrality. The most important such action was the scuttling of the French fleet in Toulon on 27 November 1942 to prevent its capture by the Axis.

Moscow maintained full diplomatic relations with the Vichy government until 30 June 1941, when they were broken by Vichy expressing support for Operation Barbarossa, the German invasion of the Soviet Union. In response to British requests and sensitivities of the French-Canadian population, Canada, despite being at war with the Axis since 1939, maintained full diplomatic relations with the Vichy regime until early November 1942, when Case Anton led to the complete occupation of Vichy France by the Germans.

Switzerland and other neutral states maintained diplomatic relations with the Vichy regime until the liberation of France in 1944, when Pétain resigned and was deported to Germany for the creation of a forced government-in-exile.

=== Relations with America ===
Washington at first granted Vichy full diplomatic recognition, sending Admiral William D. Leahy as American ambassador. US President Franklin D. Roosevelt and Secretary of State Cordell Hull hoped to use American influence to encourage elements in the Vichy government opposed to military collaboration with Germany. Washington also hoped to encourage Vichy to resist German war demands, such as for air bases in French-mandated Syria or moving war supplies through French territories in North Africa. The US position was essentially that unless explicitly required by the armistice terms, France should take no action that could adversely affect Allied efforts in the war.

The US position towards Vichy France and de Gaulle was especially hesitant and inconsistent. Roosevelt disliked de Gaulle and regarded him as an "apprentice dictator". The Americans first tried to support General Maxime Weygand, general delegate of Vichy for Africa until December 1941. After the first choice had failed, they turned to Henri Giraud shortly before the landing in North Africa on 8 November 1942. Finally, after Admiral François Darlan's turn towards the Free Forces (he had been prime minister from February 1941 to April 1942) they played him against de Gaulle.

US General Mark W. Clark of the combined Allied command made Darlan sign on 22 November 1942 a treaty putting "North Africa at the disposition of the Americans" and making France "a vassal country". Washington then imagined, between 1941 and 1942, a protectorate status for France, which would be submitted after the Liberation to an Allied Military Government of Occupied Territories (AMGOT) like Germany. After the assassination of Darlan on 24 December 1942, the Americans turned again towards Giraud to whom had rallied Maurice Couve de Murville, who had financial responsibilities in Vichy, and Lemaigre-Dubreuil, a former member of La Cagoule and entrepreneur, as well as Alfred Pose, general director of the Banque nationale pour le commerce et l'industrie (National Bank for Trade and Industry).

=== Relations with Britain ===
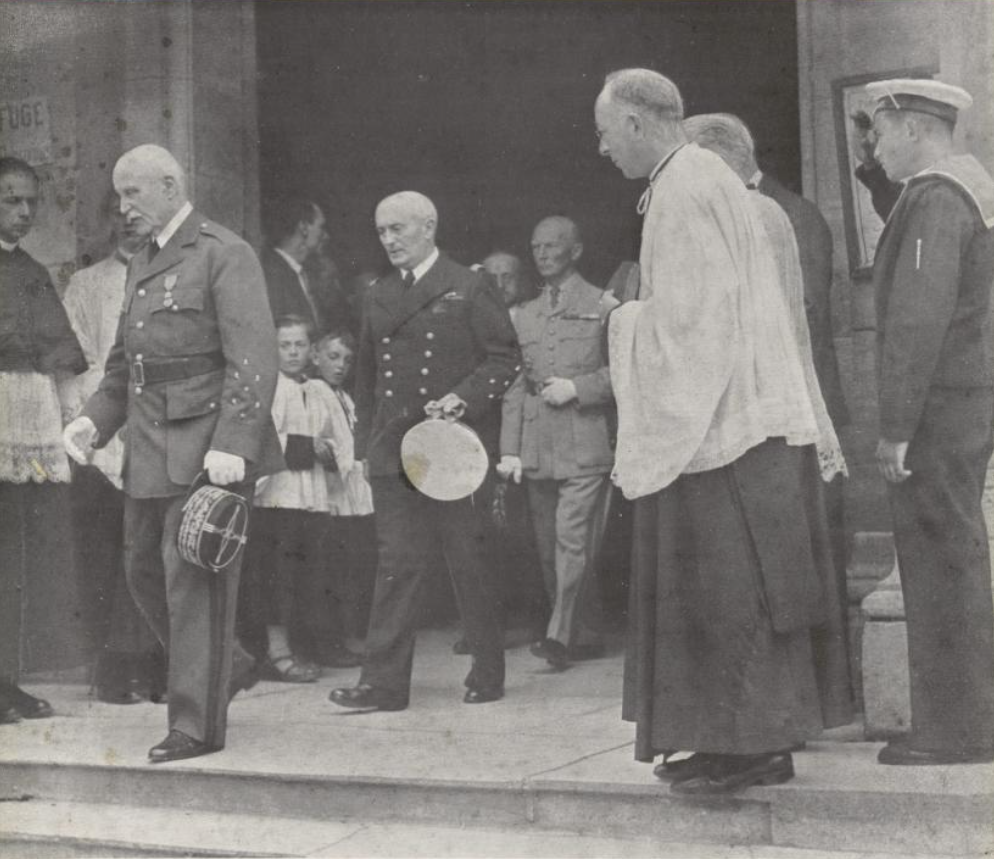
Pétain, Darlan and Charles Huntziger leaving a memorial service for the first anniversary of the attack on Mers-el-Kébir, 3 July 1941

Britain feared that the French navy could end up in German hands and used against the Royal Navy, which was vital to protecting Allied shipping and communications in the North Sea. Prior to the armistice, France had pledged to Britain that its navy would never fall into German hands but refused to send it beyond Germany's reach to Britain or the French West Indies. Under the terms of the armistice, Vichy France had been allowed to retain the French navy under strict conditions. On 3 July 1940, Force H of the Royal Navy, led by Vice-admiral Sir James Somerville, attacked a French fleet at Mers El Kébir after its commanders refused to accede to any of Somerville's demands which were designed to ensure it would not fall into German hands, destroying or damaging several warships. In response to the attack, Vichy France severed diplomatic relations with Britain, while the British recognized Free France as the legitimate French government. The French Navy squadron at Alexandria, under Vice-admiral René-Émile Godfroy, was effectively interned until 1943, when an agreement was reached with Admiral Andrew Browne Cunningham, commander of the Royal Navy's Mediterranean Fleet.

=== French Indochina, Japan and Franco-Thai War ===
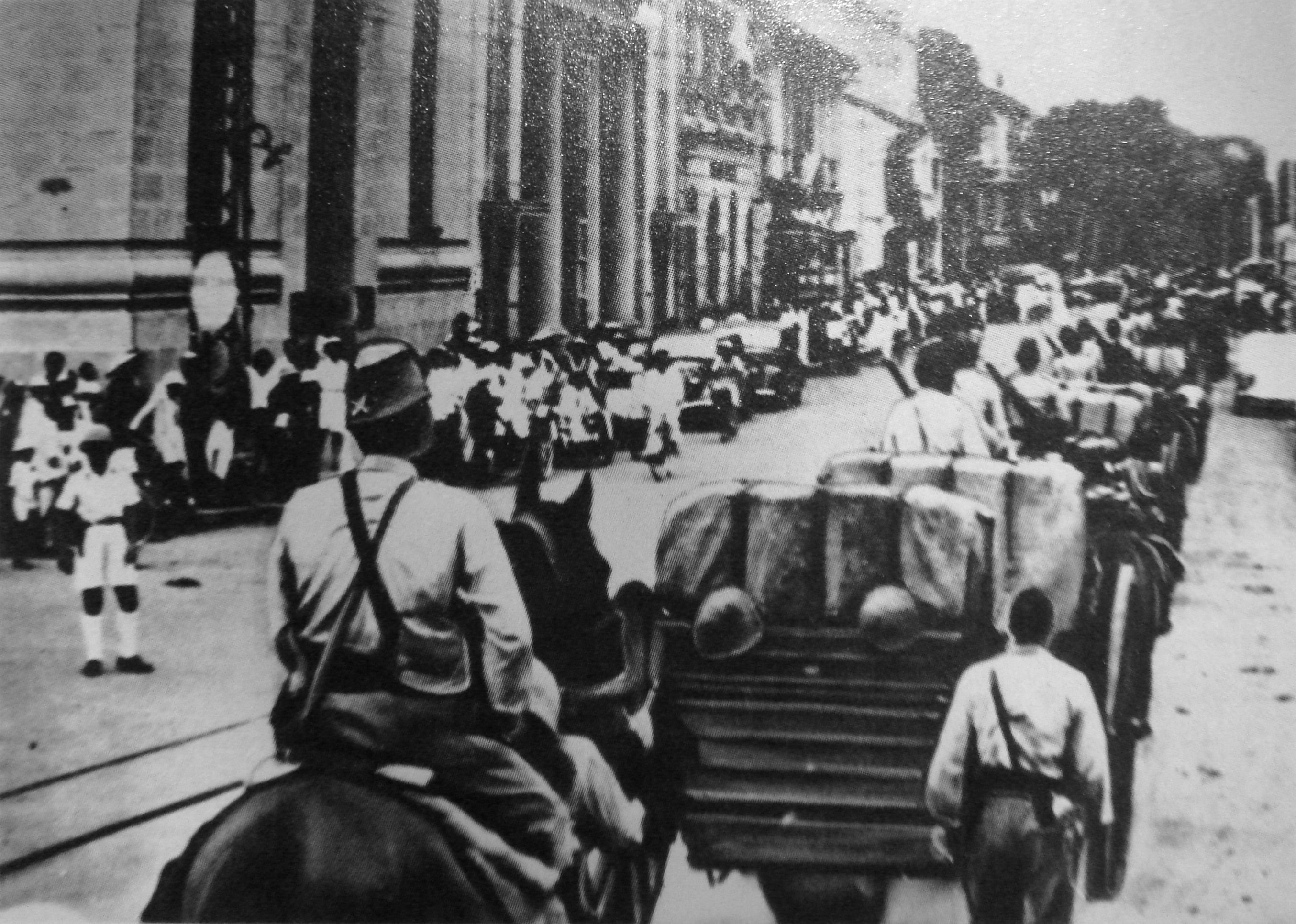
Japanese troops entering Saigon in 1941

In June 1940, the Fall of France made the French hold on Indochina tenuous. The isolated colonial administration was cut off from outside help and from outside supplies. After negotiations with Japan, the French allowed the Japanese to set up military bases in Indochina. That seemingly-subservient behaviour convinced Major-General Plaek Pibulsonggram, the prime minister of the Kingdom of Thailand, that Vichy France would not seriously resist a campaign by the Thai military to recover parts of Cambodia and Laos that had been taken from Thailand by France in the early 20th century. In October 1940, the military forces of Thailand attacked across the border with Indochina and launched the Franco-Thai War. Although the French won an important naval victory over the Thais, Japan forced the French to accept Japanese mediation of a peace treaty, which returned the disputed territory to Thai control. The French were left in place to administer the rump colony of Indochina until 9 March 1945, when the Japanese staged a coup d'état in French Indochina and took control, establishing their own colony, the Empire of Vietnam, as a puppet state controlled by Tokyo.

== Colonial struggle with Free France ==
To counter the Vichy government, General Charles de Gaulle created the Free French Forces (FFL) after his Appeal of 18 June 1940 radio address. Initially, Churchill was ambivalent about de Gaulle and severed diplomatic ties with the Vichy government only when it became clear that Vichy would not join the Allies.

=== India and Oceania ===
Until 1962, France possessed four colonies across India, the largest being Pondicherry. The colonies were small and non-contiguous but politically united. Immediately after the fall of France, the Governor General of French India, Louis Alexis Étienne Bonvin, declared that the French colonies in India would continue to fight with the British allies. Free French forces from that area and others participated in the Western Desert campaign, although news of the death of French-Indian soldiers caused some disturbances in Pondicherry. The French possessions in Oceania joined the Free French in 1940 or in one case in 1942. They later served as bases for the Allied effort in the Pacific and contributed troops to the Free French Forces.

Following the Appeal of 18 June, debate arose among the population of French Polynesia. A referendum was organized on 2 September 1940 in Tahiti and Moorea, with outlying islands reporting agreement in the following days. The vote was 5,564 to 18 in favour of joining the Free French. After the attack on Pearl Harbor, American forces identified French Polynesia as an ideal refuelling point between Hawaii and Australia and, with de Gaulle's agreement, organized "Operation Bobcat" to send nine ships with 5,000 American soldiers to build a naval refuelling base and airstrip and set up coastal defence guns on Bora Bora. That first experience was valuable in later Seabee (phonetic pronunciation of the naval acronym, CB, or Construction Battalion) efforts in the Pacific, and the Bora Bora base supplied the Allied ships and planes that fought the battle of the Coral Sea. Troops from French Polynesia and New Caledonia formed a Bataillon du Pacifique in 1940 becoming part of the 1st Free French Division in 1942, distinguishing themselves during the Battle of Bir Hakeim and subsequently combining with another unit to form the Bataillon d'infanterie de marine et du Pacifique, fought in the Italian Campaign distinguishing themselves at Garigliano during the Battle of Monte Cassino and on to Tuscany and participated in the Provence landings and onwards to the Liberation of France.

In the New Hebrides, Henri Sautot promptly declared allegiance to the Free French on 20 July, the first colonial head to do so. The resolution was decided by a combination of patriotism and economic opportunism in the expectation that independence would result. Sautot was subsequently escorted to New Caledonia on an Australian warship, where the pro-Vichy governor was overthrown on 19 September. Its location on the edge of the Coral Sea and on the flank of Australia made New Caledonia become strategically critical in the effort to combat the Japanese advance in the Pacific in 1941–1942 and to protect the sea lanes between North America and Australia. Nouméa served as a headquarters of the United States Navy (Naval Base New Caledonia, South Pacific Area) and Army in the South Pacific, and as a repair base for Allied vessels. New Caledonia contributed personnel both to the Bataillon du Pacifique and to the Free French Naval Forces that saw action in the Pacific and Indian Ocean.

In Wallis and Futuna, the local administrator and bishop sided with Vichy but faced opposition from some of the population and clergy; their attempts at naming a local king in 1941 to buffer the territory from their opponents backfired as the newly elected king refused to declare allegiance to Pétain. The situation stagnated for a long while due to the remoteness of the islands and because no overseas ship visited the islands for 17 months after January 1941. An aviso sent from Nouméa took over Wallis on behalf of the Free French on 27 May 1942 and Futuna on 29 May 1942. That allowed American forces to build an airbase and seaplane base on Wallis (Navy 207) that served the Allied Pacific operations.

=== Americas ===
A Vichy France plan to have Western Union build powerful transmitters in Saint Pierre and Miquelon in 1941 to enable private trans-Atlantic communications was blocked after pressure by Roosevelt. On 24 December 1941 Free French forces on three corvettes, supported by a submarine, landed and seized control of Saint Pierre and Miquelon on orders from Charles de Gaulle without reference to any of the Allied commanders.

French Guiana, on the northern coast of South America, removed its Vichy-supporting government on 22 March 1943, shortly after eight allied ships had been sunk by a German submarine off the coast of Guiana, and the arrival of American troops by air on 20 March.

Martinique became home to the bulk of the Gold reserve of the Bank of France, with 286 tons of gold transported there on the French cruiser Émile Bertin in June 1940. The island was blockaded by the Royal Navy until an agreement was reached to immobilize French ships in port. The British used the gold as collateral for Lend-Lease facilities from the Americans on the basis that it could be "acquired" at any time if needed. In July 1943, Free French sympathisers on the island took control of the gold and the fleet once Admiral Georges Robert departed following a threat by the United States to launch a full-scale invasion.

=== Equatorial and West Africa ===
In Central Africa, three of the four colonies in French Equatorial Africa went over to the Free French almost immediately: French Chad on 26 August 1940, French Congo on 29 August 1940, and Ubangi-Shari on 30 August 1940. They were joined by the French League of Nations mandate of Cameroun on 27 August 1940.

On 23 September 1940, the Royal Navy and Free French forces under Gaulle launched Operation Menace, an attempt to seize the strategic Vichy-held port of Dakar in French West Africa (modern Senegal). After attempts to encourage them to join the Allies were rebuffed by the defenders, fierce fighting erupted between Vichy and Allied forces. HMS Resolution was heavily damaged by torpedoes, and Free French troops landing at a beach south of the port were driven off by heavy fire. Even worse from a strategic point of view, bombers of the Vichy French Air Force based in North Africa began bombing the British base at Gibraltar in response to the attack on Dakar. Shaken by the resolute Vichy defence and not wanting to further escalate the conflict, British and Free French forces withdrew on 25 September, bringing the battle to an end.

One colony in French Equatorial Africa, Gabon, had to be occupied by military force between 27 October and 12 November 1940. On 8 November 1940, Free French forces under the command of de Gaulle and Marie-Pierre Kœnig, along with the assistance of the Royal Navy, invaded Vichy-held Gabon. The capital, Libreville, was bombed and captured. The final Vichy troops in Gabon surrendered without any military confrontation with the Allies at Port-Gentil.

=== French Somaliland ===
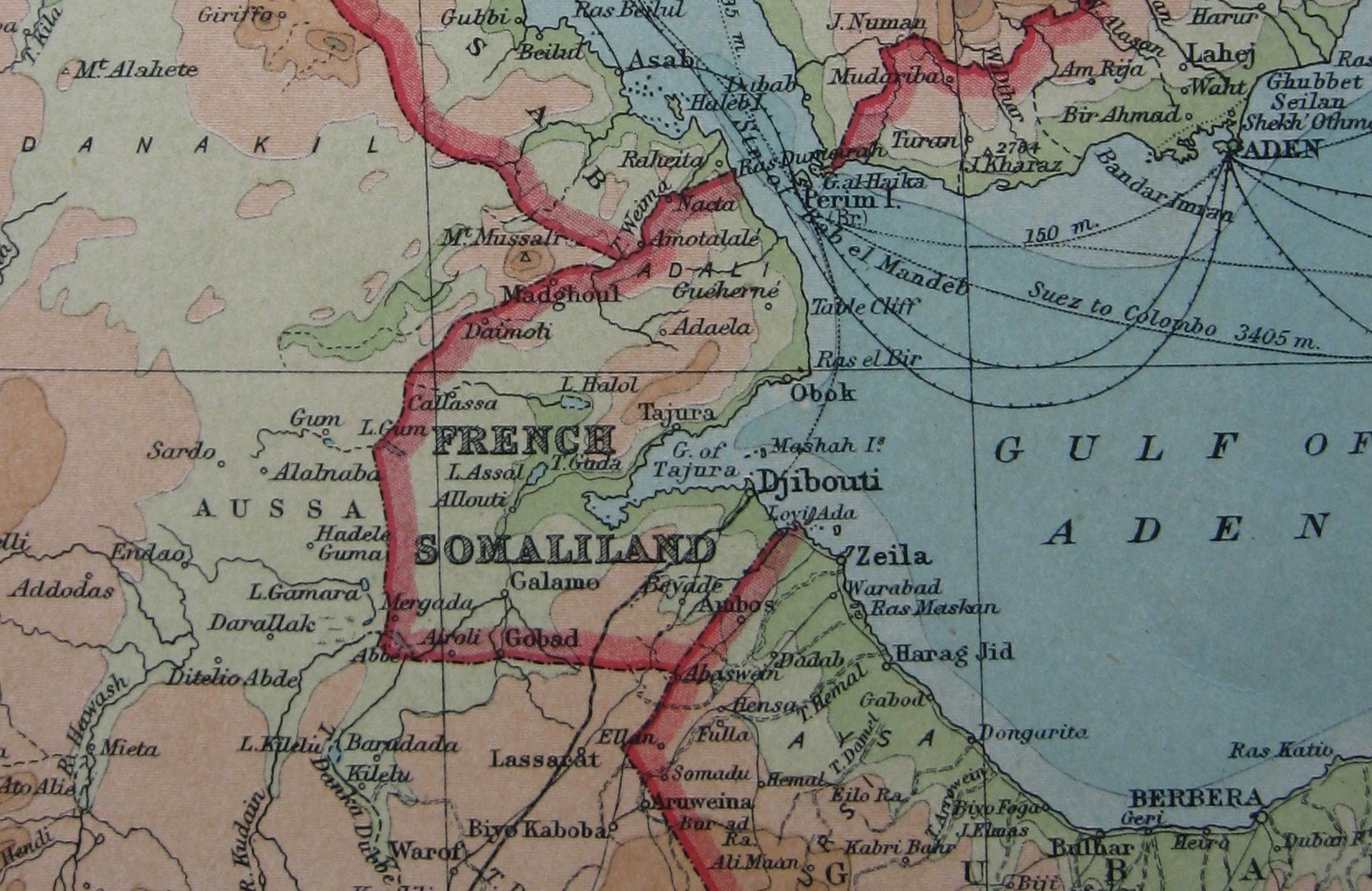
Map of French Somaliland, 1922

The governor of French Somaliland (now Djibouti), Brigadier-General Paul Legentilhomme, had a garrison of seven battalions of Senegalese and Somali infantry, three batteries of field guns, four batteries of anti-aircraft guns, a company of light tanks, four companies of militia and irregulars, two platoons of the camel corps and an assortment of aircraft. After visiting from 8–13 January 1940, British General Archibald Wavell decided that Legentilhomme would command the military forces in both Somalilands in case of war against Italy. In June, an Italian force was assembled to capture the port city of Djibouti, the main military base. After the Fall of France in June, the neutralisation of Vichy French colonies allowed the Italians to concentrate on the more lightly defended British Somaliland. On 23 July, Legentilhomme was ousted by the pro-Vichy naval officer Pierre Nouailhetas and left on 5 August for Aden, to join the Free French.

In March 1941, the British enforcement of a strict contraband regime to prevent supplies being passed on to the Italians, lost its point after the conquest of Italian East Africa. The British changed policy, with encouragement from the Free French, to "rally French Somaliland to the Allied cause without bloodshed". The Free French were to arrange a "voluntary ralliement" by propaganda (Operation Marie), and the British were to blockade the colony.

Wavell considered that if British pressure was applied, a rally would appear to have been coerced. Wavell preferred to let the propaganda continue and provided a small amount of supplies under strict control. When the policy had no effect, Wavell suggested negotiations with Vichy governor Louis Nouailhetas to use the port and railway. The suggestion was accepted by the British government but because of the concessions granted to the Vichy regime in Syria, proposals were made to invade the colony instead. In June, Nouailhetas was given an ultimatum, the blockade was tightened and the Italian garrison at Assab was defeated by an operation from Aden. For six months, Nouailhetas remained willing to grant concessions over the port and railway but would not tolerate Free French interference. In October, the blockade was reviewed, but the beginning of the war against Japan in December led to all but two blockade ships being withdrawn. On 2 January 1942, the Vichy government offered the use of the port and railway, subject to the lifting of the blockade but the British refused and ended the blockade unilaterally in March.

=== Syria and Madagascar ===
The next flashpoint between Britain and Vichy France came when a revolt in Iraq was put down by British forces in June 1941. Luftwaffe and Italian Air Force aircraft, staging through the French possession of Syria, intervened in the fighting in small numbers. That highlighted Syria as a threat to British interests in the Middle East. Consequently, on 8 June, British and Commonwealth forces invaded Syria and Lebanon; this was known as the Syria-Lebanon campaign, or Operation Exporter. The Syrian capital, Damascus, was captured on 17 June and the five-week campaign ended with the fall of Beirut and the Convention of Acre (Armistice of Saint Jean d'Acre) on 14 July 1941.

The additional participation of Free French forces in the Syrian operation was controversial within Allied circles. It raised the prospect of Frenchmen shooting at Frenchmen, raising fears of a civil war. Additionally it was believed that the Free French were widely reviled within Vichy military circles and that Vichy forces in Syria were less likely to resist the British if they were not accompanied by elements of the Free French. Nevertheless, de Gaulle convinced Churchill to allow his forces to participate, although de Gaulle was forced to agree to a joint British and Free French proclamation promising that Syria and Lebanon would become fully independent at the end of the war.

From 5 May to 6 November 1942, British and Commonwealth forces conducted Operation Ironclad, known as the Battle of Madagascar, the seizure of the large, Vichy French-controlled island of Madagascar, which the British feared Japanese forces might use as a base to disrupt trade and communications in the Indian Ocean. The initial landing at Diégo-Suarez was relatively quick, though it took British forces a further six months to gain control of the entire island.

=== French North Africa ===
Operation Torch was the American and British invasion of French North Africa (Morocco, Algeria, and Tunisia), started on 8 November 1942, with landings in Morocco and Algeria. The long-term goal was to clear German and Italian forces from North Africa, enhance naval control of the Mediterranean and prepare for an invasion of Italy in 1943. The Vichy forces initially resisted, killing 479 Allied forces and wounding 720. Admiral François Darlan initiated co-operation with the Allies, who recognized Darlan's self-nomination as High Commissioner of France (head of civil government) for North and West Africa. He ordered Vichy forces there to cease resisting and to co-operate with the Allies, and they did so. When the Tunisia Campaign was fought, the French forces in North Africa had gone over to the Allied side and joined the Free French.

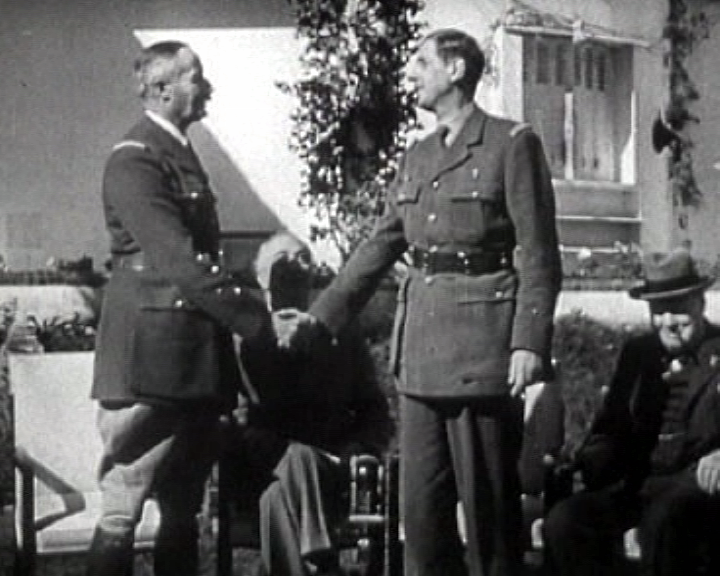
Henri Giraud and de Gaulle during the Casablanca Conference in January 1943

In North Africa, after the 8 November 1942 putsch by the French Resistance, most Vichy figures were arrested, including General Alphonse Juin, chief commander in North Africa, and Admiral Darlan. Darlan was released, and US General Dwight D. Eisenhower finally accepted his self-nomination as High Commissioner of North Africa and French West Africa (Afrique occidentale française, AOF), a move that enraged de Gaulle, who refused to recognize Darlan's status. After Darlan signed an armistice with the Allies and took power in North Africa, Germany violated the 1940 armistice with France and invaded Vichy France on 10 November 1942 in the operation code-named Case Anton, triggering the scuttling of the French fleet in Toulon.

Henri Giraud arrived in Algiers on 10 November 1942 and agreed to subordinate himself to Admiral Darlan as the French Africa army commander. Even though Darlan was now in the Allied camp, he maintained the repressive Vichy system in North Africa, including concentration camps in southern Algeria and racist laws. Detainees were also forced to work on the Trans-Saharan Railway. Jewish goods were "aryanized" (stolen), and a special Jewish Affairs service was created, directed by Pierre Gazagne. Numerous Jewish children were prohibited from going to school, which even Vichy had not implemented in Metropolitan France. Darlan was assassinated on 24 December 1942 in Algiers by the young monarchist Bonnier de La Chapelle. Although de La Chapelle had been a member of the resistance group led by Henri d'Astier de La Vigerie, he is believed to have acted as an individual.

After Darlan's assassination, Giraud became his de facto successor in French Africa with Allied support. That occurred through a series of consultations between Giraud and de Gaulle. The latter wanted to pursue a political position in France and agreed to have Giraud as commander-in-chief, who was more qualified militarily. Later, the Americans sent Jean Monnet to counsel Giraud and to press him to repeal the Vichy laws. After difficult negotiations, Giraud agreed to suppress the racist laws and to liberate Vichy prisoners from the southern Algerian concentration camps. The Cremieux decree, which granted French citizenship to Jews in Algeria and had been repealed by Vichy, was immediately restored by Gaulle.

Giraud took part in the Casablanca Conference, with Roosevelt, Churchill, and de Gaulle in January 1943. The Allies discussed their general strategy for the war and recognized joint leadership of North Africa by Giraud and de Gaulle. Giraud and de Gaulle then became co-presidents of the French Committee of National Liberation, which unified the Free French Forces and territories controlled by them and had been founded in late 1943. Democratic rule for the European population was restored in French Algeria, and the Communists and Jews liberated from the concentration camps.

In late April 1945 Pierre Gazagne, secretary of the general government headed by Yves Chataigneau, took advantage of his absence to exile anti-imperialist leader Messali Hadj and arrest the leaders of his Algerian People's Party (PPA). On the day of the Liberation of France, the GPRF would harshly repress a rebellion in Algeria during the Sétif massacre of 8 May 1945, which has been characterised by some historians as the "real beginning of the Algerian War".

== Collaboration with Nazi Germany ==
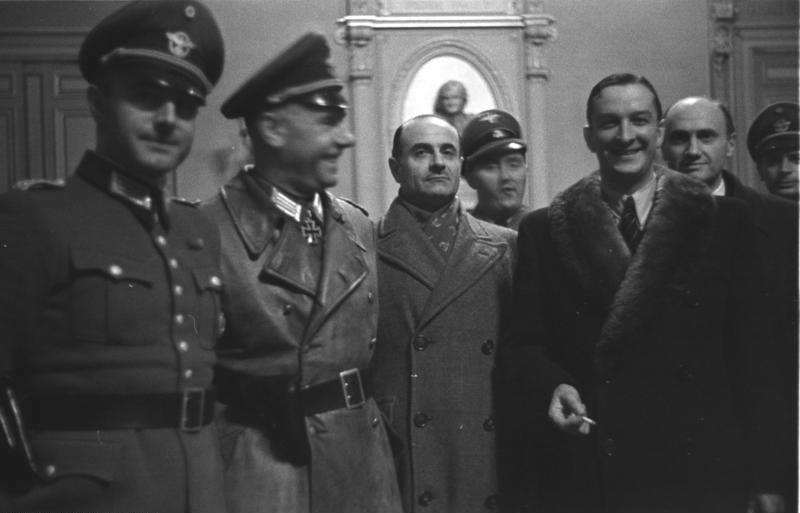
23 January 1943: German-Vichy French meeting in Marseille. SS-Sturmbannführer Bernhard Griese, Marcel Lemoine (regional préfet), Rolf Mühler (Commander of Marseille Sicherheitspolizei); laughing: René Bousquet (General Secretary of the French National Police created in 1941), creator of the GMRs; behind: Louis Darquier de Pellepoix (Commissioner for Jewish Affairs).

Vichy is often described as a German puppet state, although it has been argued it had its own agenda. Historians such as Norman Davies claim it is incorrect to call the regime a puppet state: according to Davies, it was "formed by French politicians and by French choices." Research by Robert Paxton indicated that Vichy was not a puppet state, "but rather an autonomous government, doing things partly in parallel with German actions, but which it's not required to do." As summarized by Sarah Fishman, "historiography of the Vichy regime has shown that Vichy was neither a 'puppet' regime whose policies were imposed by Germany, nor a caretaker regime, nor was it monolithic."

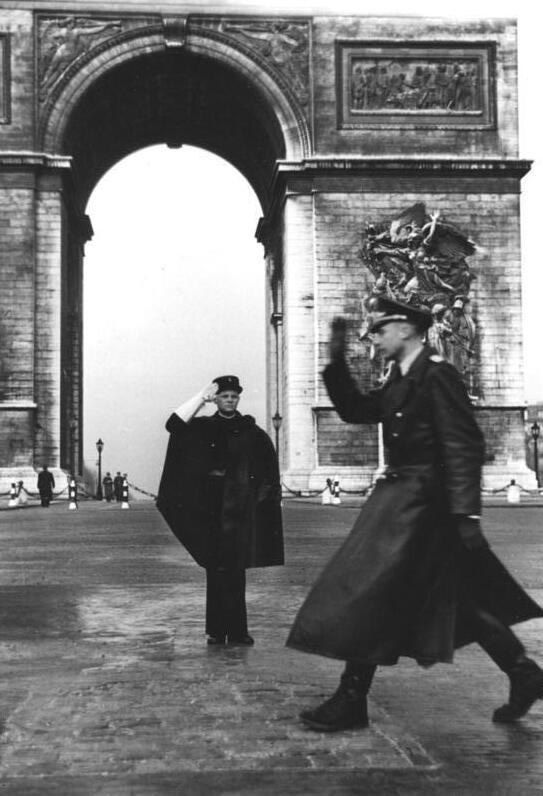
French gendarme and German officer greeting each other in front of the Arc de Triomphe in Paris in 1941

Historians distinguish between state collaboration followed by the Vichy regime, and "collaborationists", who were private French citizens eager to collaborate with Germany and who pushed towards a radicalisation of the regime. Pétainistes, on the other hand, were direct supporters of Marshal Pétain rather than Germany. State collaboration was sealed by the Montoire meeting on Hitler's train on 24 October 1940, during which Pétain and Hitler shook handshakes agreed on co-operation between the two states. Organized by Pierre Laval, a proponent of collaboration, the handshake was photographed and exploited by Nazi propaganda to gain the support of the population. On 30 October 1940, Pétain made state collaboration official, declaring on the radio: "I enter today on the path of collaboration." (Note: French: Pétain: "J'entre aujourd'hui dans la voie de la collaboration.") In June 1942, Laval declared that he was "hoping for the victory of Germany". The sincere desire to collaborate did not stop the Vichy government from organizing the arrest and even sometimes the execution of German spies entering the Vichy zone.

The composition and policies of the Vichy cabinet were mixed. Many Vichy officials, such as Pétain, were reactionaries who felt that France's unfortunate fate was a result of its republican character and left-wing governments of the 1930s, in particular of the Popular Front. Charles Maurras, a monarchist writer and founder of the Action Française movement, judged that Pétain's accession to power was, in that respect, a "divine surprise", and many people of his persuasion believed it preferable to have an authoritarian government similar to that of Francisco Franco's Spain, even if under Germany's yoke, than a republican government. Others, like Joseph Darnand, were strong anti-Semites and overt Nazi sympathizers. A number of these joined the units of the Légion des Volontaires Français contre le Bolchévisme (Legion of French Volunteers Against Bolshevism) fighting on the Eastern Front, later becoming the SS Charlemagne Division.

On the other hand, technocrats such as Jean Bichelonne and engineers from the Groupe X-Crise used their position to push state, administrative, and economic reforms. These reforms have been cited as evidence of a continuity of the French administration before and after the war. Many of these civil servants and the reforms they advocated were retained after the war. Just as the necessities of a war economy during the First World War had pushed forward state measures to reorganize the economy of France against the prevailing classical liberal theories – structures retained after the 1919 Treaty of Versailles – reforms adopted during World War II were kept and extended. Along with the 15 March 1944 Free French Charter of the Conseil National de la Résistance (CNR), which gathered all Resistance movements under one unified political body, these reforms were a primary instrument in the establishment of post-war dirigisme, a kind of semi-planned economy which led to France becoming a modern social democracy. An example of such continuities is the creation of the French Foundation for the Study of Human Problems by Alexis Carrel, a renowned physician who also supported eugenics. This institution was renamed as the National Institute of Demographic Studies (INED) after the war and exists to this day. Another example is the creation of the national statistics institute, renamed INSEE after the Liberation.

The reorganization and unification of the French police by René Bousquet, who created the groupes mobiles de réserve (GMR, Reserve Mobile Groups), is another example of Vichy policy reform and restructuring maintained by subsequent governments. A national paramilitary police force, the GMR was occasionally used in actions against the French Resistance, but its main purpose was to enforce Vichy authority through intimidation and repression of the civilian population. After Liberation, some of its units were merged with the Free French Army to form the Compagnies Républicaines de Sécurité (CRS, Republican Security Companies), France's main anti-riot force.

=== Racial policies and collaboration ===
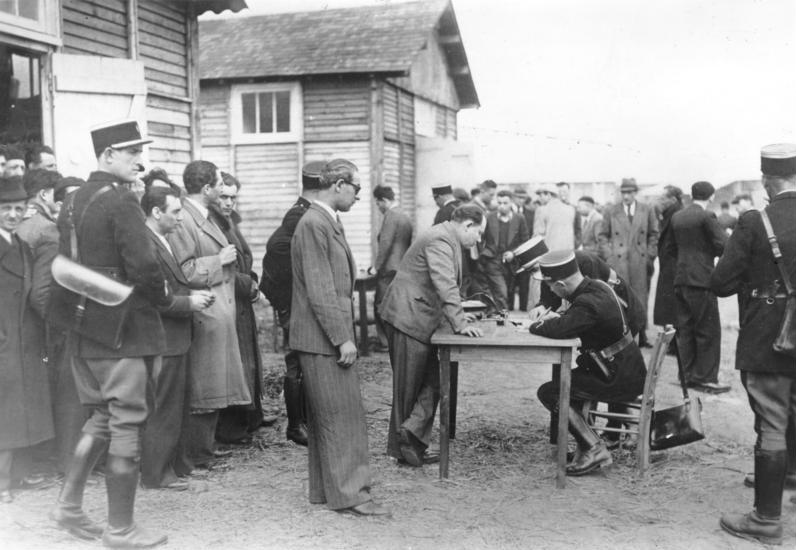
French Police registering new inmates at the Pithiviers camp

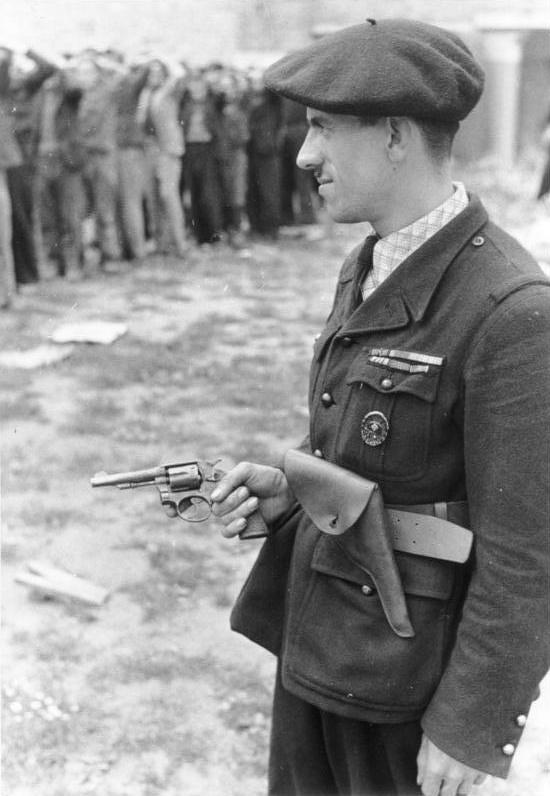
French Milice guarding detainees

Germany interfered little in internal French affairs for the first two years after the armistice, as long as public order was maintained. As soon as it was established, Pétain's government voluntarily took measures against "undesirables": Jews, métèques (immigrants from Mediterranean countries), Freemasons, Communists, Romani, homosexuals, and left-wing activists. Inspired by Charles Maurras's conception of the "Anti-France" (which he defined as the "four confederate states of Protestants, Jews, Freemasons, and foreigners"), Vichy persecuted these supposed enemies.

In July 1940, Vichy set up a special commission charged with reviewing naturalisations granted since the 1927 reform of the nationality law. Between June 1940 and August 1944, 15,000 persons, mostly Jews, were denaturalised. This bureaucratic decision was instrumental in their subsequent internment in the green ticket roundup.

The Internment camps in France inaugurated by the Third Republic were immediately put to new use, ultimately becoming transit camps for the implementation of the Holocaust and the extermination of all undesirables, including the Romani people (who refer to the extermination of the Romani as Porrajmos). A Vichy law of 4 October 1940 authorised internments of foreign Jews on the sole basis of a prefectoral order, and the first raids took place in May 1941. Vichy imposed no restrictions on black people in the Unoccupied Zone; the regime even had a mixed-race cabinet minister, the Martinique-born lawyer Henry Lémery.

The Third Republic had first opened concentration camps during World War I for the internment of enemy aliens and later used them for other purposes. Camp Gurs, for example, had been set up in southwestern France after the fall of Catalonia, in the first months of 1939, during the Spanish Civil War (1936–1939), to receive the Republican refugees, including Brigadists from all nations, fleeing the Francoists. After Édouard Daladier's government (April 1938 – March 1940) took the decision to outlaw the French Communist Party (PCF) following the signing of the German–Soviet non-aggression pact (the Molotov–Ribbentrop Pact) in August 1939, these camps were also used to intern French communists. Drancy internment camp was founded in 1939 for this use; it later became the central transit camp through which all deportees passed on their way to concentration and extermination camps in the Third Reich and Eastern Europe. When the Phoney War started with France's declaration of war against Germany on 3 September 1939, these camps were used to intern enemy aliens. These included German Jews and anti-fascists, but any German citizen (or other Axis national) could also be interned in Camp Gurs and others. As the Wehrmacht advanced into Northern France, common prisoners evacuated from prisons were also interned in these camps. Camp Gurs received its first contingent of political prisoners in June 1940. It included left-wing activists (communists, anarchists, trade-unionists, anti-militarists) and pacifists, as well as French fascists who supported Italy and Germany. Finally, after Pétain's proclamation of the "French State" and the beginning of the implementation of the "Révolution nationale" (National Revolution), the French administration opened up many concentration camps, to the point that, as historian Maurice Rajsfus writes, "The quick opening of new camps created employment, and the Gendarmerie never ceased to hire during this period."

Suspicions had been raised among prefects and police officials by the Vichy Minister of Interior as to the intentions of the men working within the camps. Many were suspected of retaining ties to anti-fascist groups as well as the burgeoning maquis and resistance groups, in particular in the southern departments. The Vichy Minister of Interior wrote in 1942; "I am advised that the Travailleurs Étrangers...continue to be mobilization centres on behalf of the revolution. The responsible leaders of the communist activities have been recruiting among the Spanish Republicans...who, during the civil war in their own country, showed that they are capable of furnishing the core of an insurrectionary army".

Besides the political prisoners already detained there, Gurs was then used to intern foreign Jews, stateless persons, and Romani. Social undesirables such as homosexuals and prostitutes were also interned. Vichy opened its first internment camp in the northern zone on 5 October 1940, in Aincourt, in the Seine-et-Oise department, which it quickly filled with PCF members. The Royal Saltworks at Arc-et-Senans, in the Doubs, was used to intern Romani. The Camp des Milles, near Aix-en-Provence, was the largest internment camp in the Southeast of France; twenty-five hundred Jews were deported from there following the August 1942 raids. Exiled Republican, antifascist Spaniards who had sought refuge in France after the Nationalist victory in the Spanish Civil War were then deported, and 5,000 of them died in Mauthausen concentration camp. In contrast, French colonial soldiers were interned by the Germans in French territory instead of being deported.

Besides the concentration camps opened by Vichy, the Germans also opened some Ilags (Internierungslager) for the detention of enemy aliens on French territory; in Alsace, which was under the direct administration of the Reich, they opened the Natzweiler camp, the only concentration camp created by the Nazis on French territory. Natzweiler included a gas chamber, which was used to exterminate at least 86 detainees (mostly Jewish) with the aim of obtaining a collection of undamaged skeletons for the use of Nazi professor August Hirt.

The Vichy government took a number of racially motivated measures. In August 1940, laws against antisemitism in the media (the Marchandeau Act) were repealed, while decree n°1775 of 5 September 1943 denaturalised a number of French citizens, in particular Jews from Eastern Europe. Foreigners were rounded-up in "Foreign Workers' Groups" (groupements de travailleurs étrangers) and as with the colonial troops, used by the Germans as manpower. The October law on the status of Jews excluded them from the civil administration and numerous other professions.

Vichy also enacted racial laws in its territories in North Africa. "The history of the Holocaust in France's three North African colonies (Algeria, Morocco, and Tunisia) is intrinsically tied to France's fate during this period."

With regard to economic contribution to the German economy, it is estimated that France provided 42% of the total foreign aid.

==== Eugenics policies ====
In 1941, Nobel Prize winner Alexis Carrel, an early proponent of eugenics and euthanasia, and a member of Jacques Doriot's French Popular Party (PPF), advocated the creation of the French Foundation for the Study of Human Problems (Fondation Française pour l'Étude des Problèmes Humains), using connections to the Pétain cabinet. Charged with the "study, in all of its aspects, of measures aimed at safeguarding, improving and developing the French population in all of its activities", the Foundation was created by decree of the collaborationist Vichy regime in 1941, and Carrel was appointed as "regent". The Foundation also had for some time as general secretary François Perroux.

The Foundation was behind the 16 December 1942 Act mandating the "prenuptial certificate", which required all couples seeking marriage to submit to a biological examination, to ensure the "good health" of the spouses, in particular with regard to sexually transmitted diseases (STDs) and "life hygiene". Carrel's institute also conceived the "scholar booklet" ("livret scolaire"), which could be used to record students' grades in French secondary schools and thus classify and select them according to scholastic performance. Besides these eugenic activities aimed at classifying the population and improving its health, the Foundation also supported an 11 October 1946 law instituting occupational medicine, enacted by the Provisional Government of the French Republic (GPRF) after the Liberation.

The Foundation initiated studies on demographics (Robert Gessain, Paul Vincent, Jean Bourgeois), nutrition (Jean Sutter), and housing (Jean Merlet), as well as the first polls (Jean Stoetzel). The foundation, which after the war became the INED demographics institute, employed 300 researchers from the summer of 1942 to the end of the autumn of 1944. "The foundation was chartered as a public institution under the joint supervision of the ministries of finance and public health. It was given financial autonomy and a budget of forty million francs, roughly one franc per inhabitant: a true luxury considering the burdens imposed by the German Occupation on the nation's resources. By way of comparison, the whole Centre National de la Recherche Scientifique (CNRS) was given a budget of fifty million francs."

Alexis Carrel had previously published in 1935 the best-selling book L'Homme, cet inconnu ("Man, This Unknown"). Since the early 1930s, Carrel had advocated the use of gas chambers to rid humanity of its "inferior stock", endorsing the scientific racism discourse. One of the founders of these pseudoscientifical theories had been Arthur de Gobineau in his 1853–1855 essay titled "An Essay on the Inequality of the Human Races". In the 1936 preface to the German edition of his book, Alexis Carrel had added a praise to the eugenics policies of the Third Reich, writing the following:

The German government has taken energetic measures against the propagation of the defective, the mentally diseased, and the criminal. The ideal solution would be the suppression of each of these individuals as soon as he has proven himself to be dangerous.

Carrel also wrote this in his book:

The conditioning of petty criminals with the whip, or some more scientific procedure, followed by a short stay in hospital, would probably suffice to ensure order. Those who have murdered, robbed while armed with automatic pistol or machine gun, kidnapped children, despoiled the poor of their savings, misled the public in important matters, should be humanely and economically disposed of in small euthanasic institutions supplied with proper gasses. A similar treatment could be advantageously applied to the insane, guilty of criminal acts.

Alexis Carrel had also taken an active part to a symposium in Pontigny organized by Jean Coutrot, the "Entretiens de Pontigny". Scholars such as Lucien Bonnafé, Patrick Tort, and Max Lafont have accused Carrel of responsibility for the execution of thousands of mentally ill or impaired patients under Vichy.

==== Antisemitic laws ====
A Nazi ordinance dated 21 September 1940 forced Jews of the occupied zone to declare themselves as such at a police station or sub-prefectures (sous-préfectures). Under the responsibility of André Tulard, head of the Service on Foreign Persons and Jewish Questions at the Prefecture of Police of Paris, a filing system registering Jewish people was created. Tulard had previously created such a filing system under the Third Republic, registering members of the Communist Party (PCF). In the department of the Seine, encompassing Paris and its immediate suburbs, nearly 150,000 persons, unaware of the upcoming danger and assisted by the police, presented themselves at police stations in accordance with the military order. The registered information was then centralised by the French police, who constructed, under the direction of inspector Tulard, a central filing system. According to the Dannecker report, "this filing system is subdivided into files alphabetically classed, Jewish with French nationality and foreign Jewish having files of different colours, and the files were also classed, according to profession, nationality and street [of residency]". These files were then handed over to Theodor Dannecker, head of the Gestapo in France, under the orders of Adolf Eichmann, head of the RSHA IV-D. They were used by the Gestapo on various raids, among them the August 1941 raid in the 11th arrondissement of Paris, which resulted in 3,200 foreign and 1,000 French Jews being interned in various camps, including Drancy.

On 3 October 1940, the Vichy government promulgated the Law on the status of Jews, which created a special underclass of French Jewish citizens. The law excluded Jews from the administration, the armed forces, entertainment, arts, media, and certain professions, such as teaching, law, and medicine. The next day, a law regarding foreign Jews was signed authorising their detention. A Commissariat-General for Jewish Affairs (CGQJ, Commissariat Général aux Questions Juives) was created on 29 March 1941. It was directed by Xavier Vallat until May 1942, and then by Darquier de Pellepoix until February 1944. Mirroring the Reich Association of Jews, the Union générale des israélites de France was founded.

The police oversaw the confiscation of telephones and radios from Jewish homes and enforced a curfew on Jews starting in February 1942. They also enforced requirements that Jews not appear in public places and ride only on the last car of the Parisian metro.

Along with many French police officials, André Tulard was present on the day of the inauguration of Drancy internment camp in 1941, which was used largely by French police as the central transit camp for detainees captured in France. All Jews and others "undesirables" passed through Drancy before heading to Auschwitz and other camps.

=== July 1942 Vel' d'Hiv Roundup ===
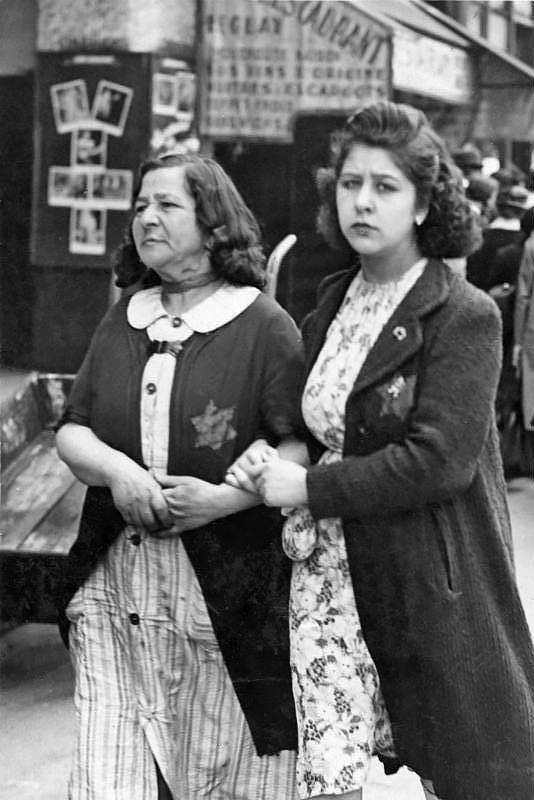
Two Jewish women in occupied Paris wearing yellow badges before the mass arrests

In July 1942, under German orders, the French police organized the Vel' d'Hiv Roundup (Rafle du Vel' d'Hiv) under orders by René Bousquet and his second in Paris, Jean Leguay, with co-operation from authorities of the SNCF, the state railway company. The police arrested 13,152 Jews, including 4,051 children – which the Gestapo had not asked for – and 5,082 women, on 16 and 17 July and imprisoned them in the Vélodrome d'Hiver (Winter Velodrome) in unhygienic conditions. They were led to Drancy internment camp (run by Nazi Alois Brunner and French constabulary police) and crammed into box cars and shipped by rail to Auschwitz. Most of the victims died en route due to lack of food or water. The remaining survivors were sent to the gas chambers. This action alone represented more than a quarter of the 42,000 French Jews sent to concentration camps in 1942, of whom only 811 would return after the end of the war. Although the Nazi VT (Verfügungstruppe) had directed the action, French police authorities vigorously participated. "There was no effective police resistance until the end of Spring of 1944", wrote historians Jean-Luc Einaudi and Maurice Rajsfus.

=== August 1942 and January 1943 raids ===
The French police, headed by Bousquet, arrested 7,000 Jews in the southern zone in August 1942. 2,500 of them transited through the Camp des Milles near Aix-en-Provence before arriving at Drancy. Then, on 22, 23, and 24 January 1943, assisted by Bousquet's police force, the Germans organized a raid in Marseille. During the Battle of Marseille, the French police checked the identity documents of 40,000 people, and the operation sent 2,000 Marseillese people in the death trains, leading to the extermination camps. The operation also encompassed the expulsion of an entire neighbourhood (30,000 persons) in the Old Port before its destruction. For this occasion, then SS-Gruppenführer Carl Oberg, in charge of the German Police in France, made the trip from Paris and transmitted to Bousquet orders directly received from Heinrich Himmler. It is another notable case of the French police's wilful collaboration with the Nazis.

=== Jewish death toll ===
In 1940, approximately 350,000 Jews lived in metropolitan France, less than half of them with French citizenship (the others being foreign, mostly exiles from Germany during the 1930s). About 200,000 of them, and the large majority of foreign Jews, resided in Paris and its outskirts. Among the 150,000 French Jews, about 30,000, generally native from Central Europe, had been naturalised French during the 1930s. Of the total, approximately 25,000 French Jews and 50,000 foreign Jews were deported. According to historian Robert Paxton, 76,000 Jews were deported and died in concentration and extermination camps. Including the Jews who died in concentration camps in France, this would have made for a total figure of 90,000 Jewish deaths (a quarter of the total Jewish population before the war, by his estimate). Paxton's numbers imply that 14,000 Jews died in French concentration camps, but the systematic census of Jewish deportees from France (citizens or not) drawn under Serge Klarsfeld concluded that 3,000 had died in French concentration camps and 1,000 more had been shot. Of the approximately 76,000 deported, 2,566 survived. The total thus reported is slightly below 77,500 dead (somewhat less than a quarter of the Jewish population in France in 1940). Over half of the Jews deported from France were from Paris, with the majority of these Parisian Jews being taken into custody by the Paris Police Prefecture rather than by the Germans.

Proportionally, either number makes for a lower death toll than in some other countries (in the Netherlands, 75% of the Jewish population was murdered). This fact has been used as arguments by supporters of Vichy; according to Paxton, the figure would have been greatly lower if the "French state" had not wilfully collaborated with Germany, which lacked staff for police activities. During the Vel' d'Hiv Roundup of July 1942, Laval ordered the deportation of children, against explicit German orders. Paxton pointed out that if the total number of victims had not been higher, it was due to the shortage in wagons, the resistance of the civilian population, and deportation in other countries (notably in Italy).

=== Government responsibility ===
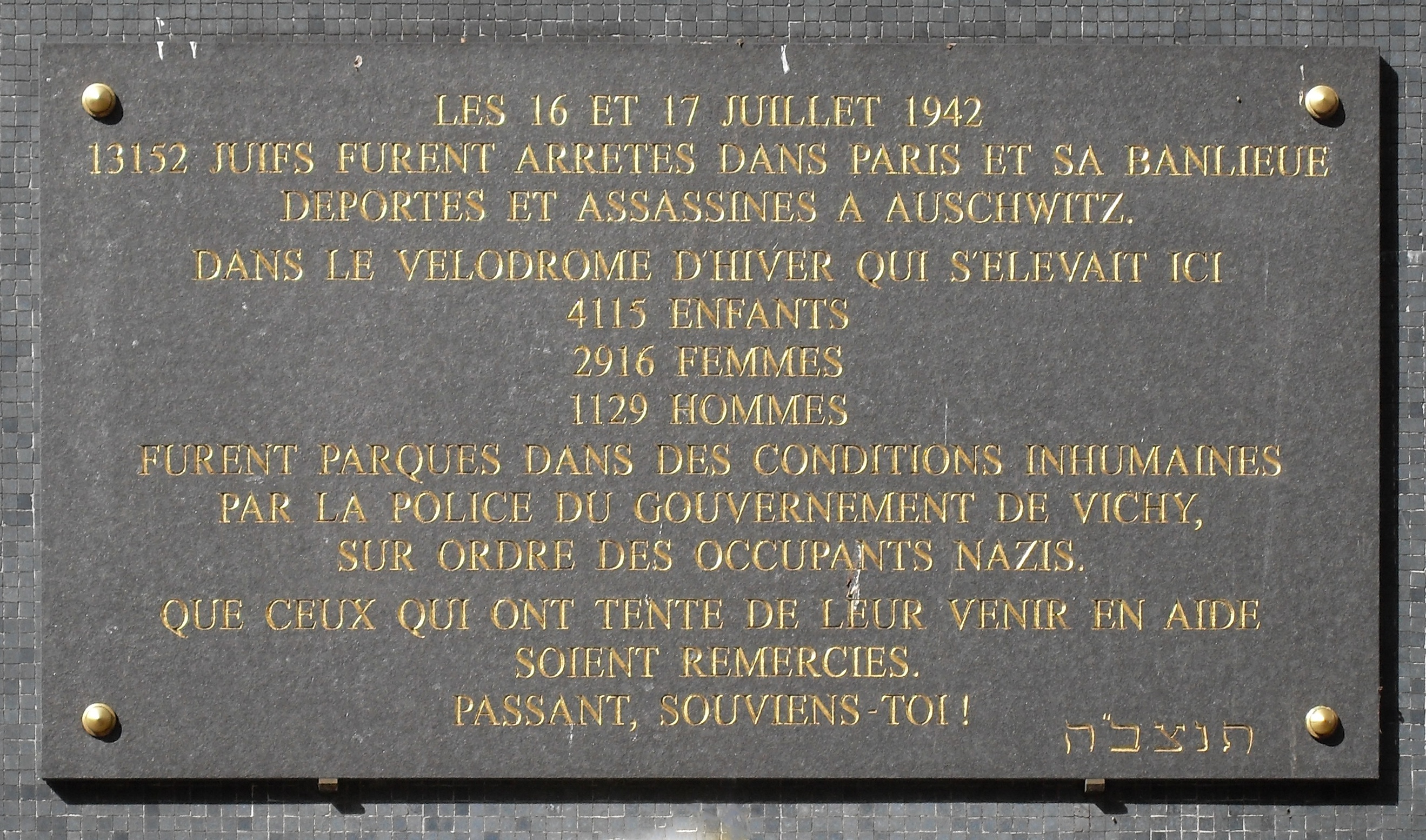
Commemorative plaque to the victims held in the Vel' d'Hiv after the 16–17 July 1942 roundup of Jews in Paris

For decades, the French government argued that the French Republic had been dismantled when Philippe Pétain instituted a new French State during the war and that the Republic had been reestablished when the war was over. It was not for the Republic, therefore, to apologise for events that happened while it had not existed and that had been carried out by a State it did not recognize. For example, former President François Mitterrand had maintained that the Vichy Government, not France's Republic, was responsible. This position was more recently reiterated by Marine Le Pen, leader of the National Front Party, during the 2017 election campaign.

The first official admission that the French State had been complicit in the deportation of 76,000 Jews during WW II was made in 1995 by then President Jacques Chirac, at the site of the Vélodrome d'Hiver, where 13,000 Jews had been rounded up for deportation to death camps in July 1942. "France, on that day [16 July 1942], committed the irreparable. Breaking its word, it handed those who were under its protection over to their executioners," he said. Those responsible for the roundup were "450 policemen and gendarmes, French, under the authority of their leaders [who] obeyed the demands of the Nazis..... the criminal folly of the occupiers was seconded by the French, by the French state".

On 16 July 2017, also at a ceremony at the Vel' d'Hiv site, President Emmanuel Macron denounced the country's role in the Holocaust in France and the historical revisionism that denied France's responsibility for the 1942 roundup and subsequent deportation of 13,000 Jews. "It was indeed France that organised this," Macron insisted, French police collaborating with the Nazis. "Not a single German" was directly involved," he added. Macron was even more specific than Chirac had been in stating that the Government during the War was certainly that of France. "It is convenient to see the Vichy regime as born of nothingness, returned to nothingness. Yes, it's convenient, but it is false. We cannot build pride upon a lie."

Macron made a subtle reference to Chirac's remark when he added, "I say it again here. It was indeed France that organized the roundup, the deportation, and thus, for almost all, death."

== Collaborationnistes ==
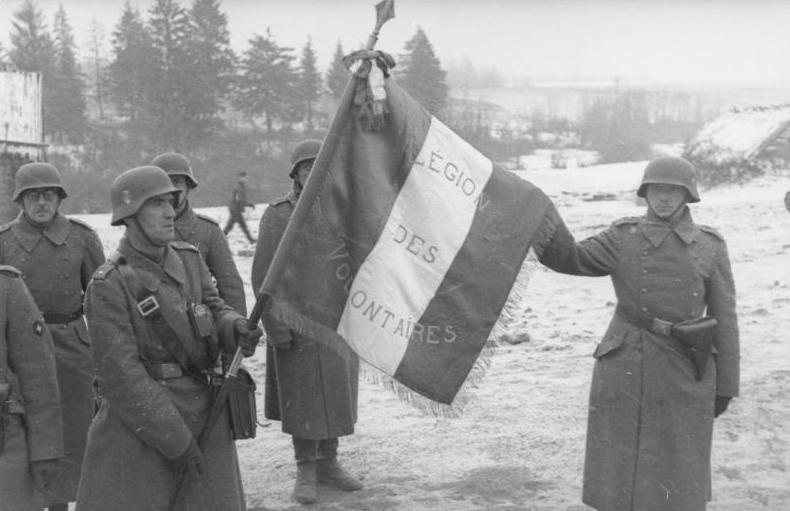
Légion des volontaires fighting with the Axis on the Eastern Front

Stanley Hoffmann in 1974 and then other historians such as Robert Paxton and Jean-Pierre Azéma have used the term collaborationnistes to refer to fascists and Nazi sympathisers who, for ideological reasons, wished a reinforced collaboration with Hitler's Germany. Examples are the French Popular Party (PPF) leader Jacques Doriot, the writer Robert Brasillach or Marcel Déat. A principal motivation and ideological foundation among collaborationnistes was anti-communism.

Collaborationnisme (English: collaborationism) should be distinguished from collaboration. Collaborationnisme refers to those, primarily from the fascist right, who embraced the goal of a German victory as their own, whereas collaboration refers to those of the French who for whatever reason collaborated with the Germans. Organizations such as La Cagoule opposed the Third Republic, particularly while the left-wing Popular Front was in power.

Collaborationnistes may have influenced the Vichy government's policies, but ultra-collaborationnistes never comprised the majority of the government before 1944.

To enforce the regime's will, some paramilitary organizations were created. One example was the French Legion of Veterans, including at first only former combatants but quickly adding Amis de la légion and cadets of the Légion, who had never seen battle but supported Pétain's regime. The name was then quickly changed to Légion française des combattants et des volontaires de la Révolution nationale (French Legion of Fighters and Volunteers of the National Revolution). Joseph Darnand created a Service d'ordre légionnaire (SOL), which consisted mostly of French supporters of the Nazis and was fully approved by Pétain.

== Social and economic history ==
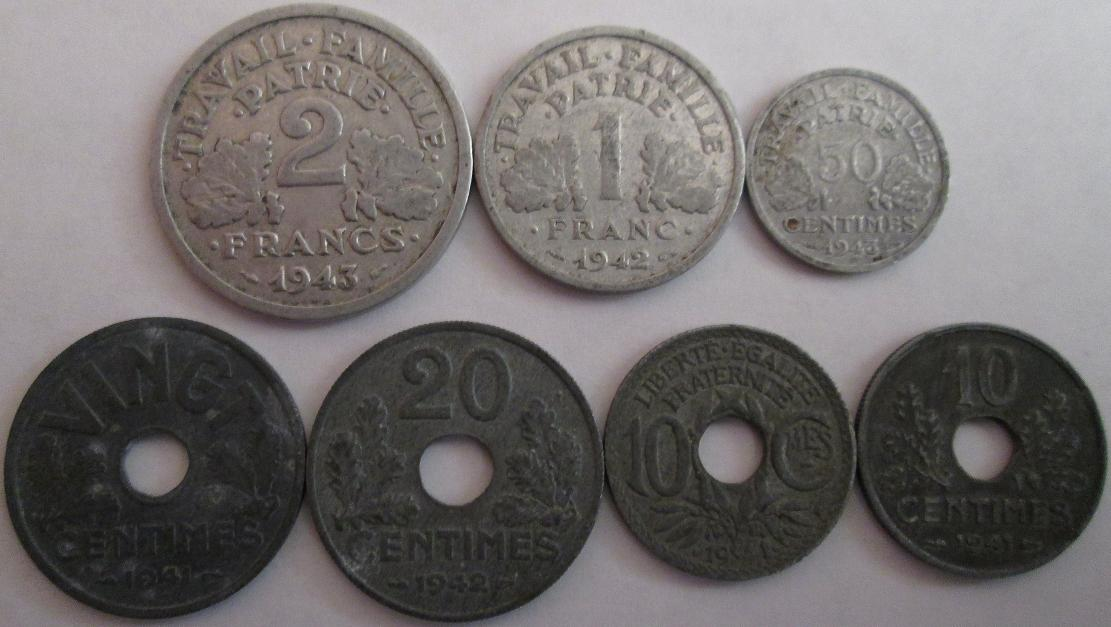
Vichy French zinc and aluminium coins made during the war circulated in both the German–occupied zone and Vichy's unoccupied zone.

Vichy authorities strongly opposed "modern" social trends and promoted "national regeneration" to restore behaviour more in line with traditional Catholicism. Philip Manow argued that, "Vichy represents the authoritarian, antidemocratic solution that the French political right, in coalition with the national Church hierarchy, had sought repeatedly during the interwar period and almost put in place in 1934". Calling for "National Regeneration", Vichy reversed many liberal policies and began tight supervision of the economy, with central planning as a key feature.

Labour unions came under tight government control. There were no elections. The independence of women was reversed, with an emphasis put on motherhood. Government agencies had to fire married women employees. Conservative Catholics became prominent. Paris lost its avant-garde status in European art and culture. The media were tightly controlled and stressed virulent anti-Semitism and, after June 1941, anti-Bolshevism. Hans Petter Graver wrote that Vichy "is notorious for its enactment of anti-Semitic laws and decrees, and these were all loyally enforced by the judiciary".

=== Economy ===
Vichy-era poster calling for volunteers to work in Germany in exchange for French prisoners of war

Vichy rhetoric exalted the skilled labourer and small businessman. In practice, the needs of artisans for raw materials were neglected in favour of big businesses. The General Committee for the Organization of Commerce (CGOC) was a national program to modernise and professionalise small business. In 1941 it also instituted the mobilisation of non-ferrous metals under the cover of supporting French agriculture but in fact to support flagging German armament production.

In 1940, the government took direct control of all production, which was synchronized with German demands. It replaced free trade unions with compulsory state unions that dictated labour policy without regard to the voice or needs of the workers. The centralised bureaucratic control of the French economy was not a success, as German demands grew heavier and more unrealistic, passive resistance and inefficiencies multiplied and Allied bombers hit the rail yards. Vichy made the first comprehensive long-range plans for the French economy, but the government had never attempted a comprehensive overview. De Gaulle's provisional government in 1944–45 quietly used the Vichy plans as a base for its own reconstruction program. The Monnet Plan of 1946 reaped the heritage of previous efforts at planning in the 1930s, Vichy, the Resistance, and the Provisional Government. Monnet's plan to modernise the economy was designed to improve the country's competitive position so as to prepare it for participation in an open multilateral system and, thereby, to reduce the need for trade protection.

==== Forced labour ====
Nazi Germany kept French prisoners-of-war as forced labourers throughout the war. They added compulsory and volunteer workers from occupied nations, especially in metal factories. The shortage of volunteers led the Vichy government to pass a law in September 1942 that effectively deported workers to Germany, where they were 15% of the labour force by August 1944. The largest number worked in the giant Krupp steel works in Essen. Low pay, long hours, frequent bombings and crowded air raid shelters added to the unpleasant conditions of poor housing, inadequate heating, limited food, and poor medical care, all compounded by harsh Nazi discipline. The workers finally returned home in the summer of 1945. The forced labour draft encouraged the French Resistance and undermined the Vichy government.

==== Food shortages ====
A large black market developed in Vichy France. Civilians suffered shortages of all varieties of consumer goods. The rationing system was stringent and badly mismanaged, leading to malnourishment, black markets and hostility to state management of the food supply. The Germans seized about 20% of the French food production, causing severe disruption to the French household economy. French farm production fell by half because of lack of fuel, fertiliser and workers. Even so, the Germans seized half the meat, 20% of the produce and 2% of the champagne. Supply problems quickly affected French stores, which lacked most items. The government answered by rationing, but German officials set the policies, and hunger prevailed, especially affecting youth in urban areas. The queues lengthened in front of shops.

Some people, including German soldiers, benefited from the black market, where food was sold without tickets at very high prices. Farmers especially diverted meat to the black market and so there was much less for the open market. Counterfeit food tickets were also in circulation. Direct buying from farmers in the countryside and barter against cigarettes became common although those activities were strictly forbidden and thus carried the risk of confiscation and fines.

Food shortages were most acute in the large cities. In the more remote country villages, clandestine slaughtering, vegetable gardens and the availability of milk products permitted better survival. The official ration provided starvation level diets of 1013 or fewer calories a day, supplemented by home gardens and especially black market purchases.

=== Women ===
The two million French soldiers held as prisoners of war and forced labourers in Germany throughout the war were not at risk of death in combat, but the anxieties of separation for their 800,000 wives were high. The government provided a modest allowance, but one in ten became prostitutes to support their families.

Meanwhile, the Vichy regime promoted a highly-traditional model of female roles. The National Revolution's official ideology fostered the patriarchal family, headed by a man with a subservient wife, who was devoted to her many children. It gave women a key symbolic role to carry out the national regeneration and used propaganda, women's organizations and legislation to promote maternity; patriotic duty and female submission to marriage, home and children's education. The falling birth rate appeared to be a grave problem to Vichy, which introduced family allowances and opposed birth control and abortion. Conditions were very difficult for housewives, as food was short as well as most necessities. Mother's Day became a major date in the Vichy calendar, with festivities in the towns and schools featuring the awarding of medals to mothers of numerous children. Divorce laws were made much more stringent, and restrictions were placed on the employment of married women. Family allowances, which had begun in the 1930s, were continued and became a vital lifeline for many families as a monthly cash bonus for having more children.

On the other side, women of the Resistance, many of whom were associated with combat groups linked to the French Communist Party, broke the gender barrier by fighting side by side with men. After the war, this was considered to have been a mistake, but France did give women the vote in 1944.

== German invasion, November 1942 ==
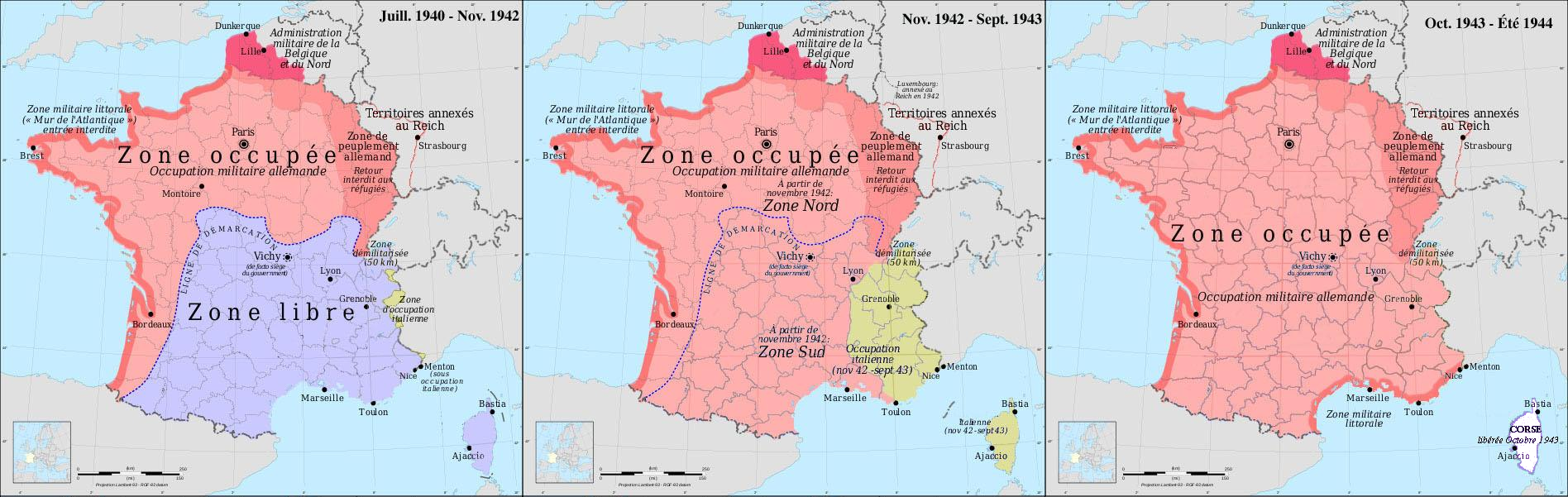
Progressive end of the Vichy regime

Hitler ordered Case Anton to occupy Corsica and then the rest of the unoccupied southern zone in immediate reaction to the landing of the Allies in North Africa (Operation Torch) on 8 November 1942. Following the conclusion of the operation on 12 November, Vichy's remaining military forces were disbanded. Vichy continued to exercise its remaining jurisdiction over almost all of metropolitan France, with the residual power devolved into the hands of Laval, until the gradual collapse of the regime following the Allied invasion in June 1944. On 7 September 1944, following the Allied invasion of France, the remnants of the Vichy government cabinet fled to Germany and established a puppet government in exile in the so-called Sigmaringen enclave. That rump government finally fell when the city was taken by the Allied French army in April 1945.

Part of the residual legitimacy of the Vichy regime resulted from the continued ambivalence of U.S. and other leaders. President Roosevelt continued to cultivate Vichy, and promoted General Henri Giraud as a preferable alternative to de Gaulle, despite the poor performance of Vichy forces in North Africa – Admiral François Darlan had landed in Algiers the day before Operation Torch. Algiers was headquarters of the Vichy French 19th Army Corps, which controlled Vichy military units in North Africa. Darlan was neutralised within 15 hours by a 400-strong French resistance force. Roosevelt and Churchill accepted Darlan, rather than de Gaulle, as the French leader in North Africa. De Gaulle had not even been informed of the landing in North Africa. The United States also resented the Free French taking control of Saint Pierre and Miquelon on 24 December 1941, because, Secretary of State Cordell Hull believed, it interfered with a U.S.–Vichy agreement to maintain the status quo with respect to French territorial possessions in the western hemisphere.

Following the invasion of France via Normandy and Provence (Operation Overlord and Operation Dragoon) and the departure of the Vichy leaders, the U.S., the United Kingdom and the Soviet Union finally recognized the Provisional Government of the French Republic (GPRF) headed by de Gaulle as the legitimate government of France on 23 October 1944. Before that, the first return of democracy to Metropolitan France since 1940 had occurred with the declaration of the Free Republic of Vercors on 3 July 1944, at the behest of the Free French government – but that act of resistance was quashed by an overwhelming German attack by the end of July.

== Decline of the regime ==
=== Independence of the SOL ===
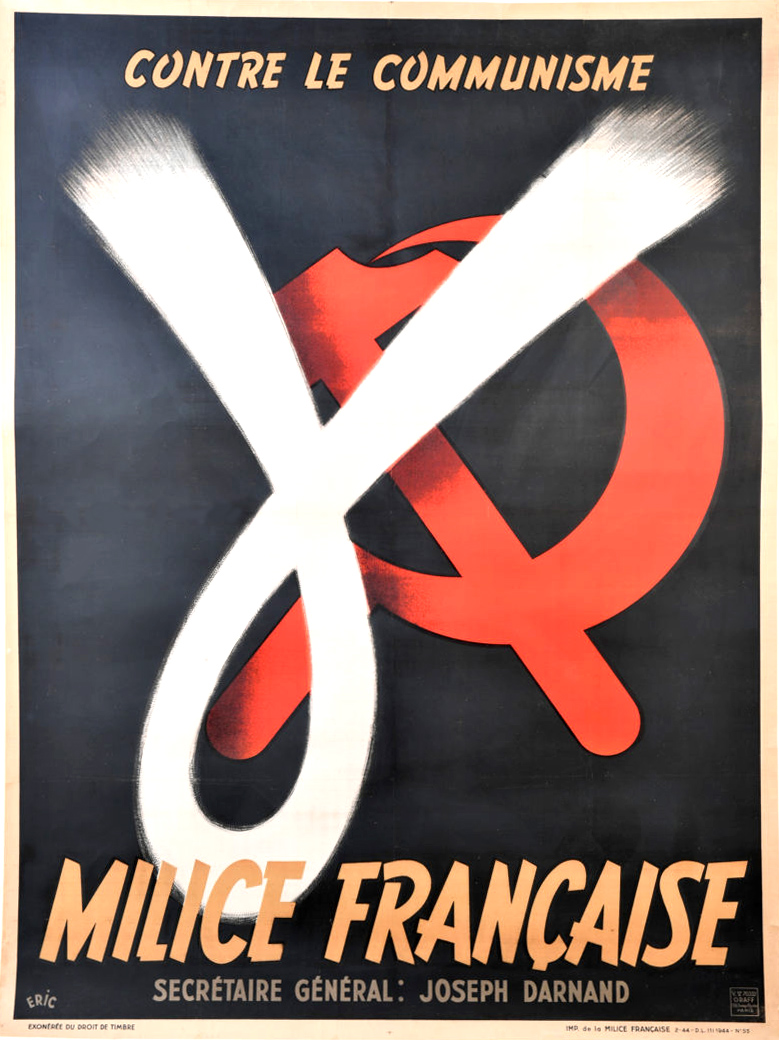
A recruitment poster for the Milice. The text says "Against Communism / French Militia / Secretary-General Joseph Darnand".

In 1943 the Service d'ordre légionnaire (SOL) collaborationist militia, headed by Joseph Darnand, became independent and was transformed into the "Milice française" (French Militia). Officially directed by Pierre Laval himself, the SOL was led by Darnand, who held an SS rank and pledged an oath of loyalty to Adolf Hitler. Under Darnand and his sub-commanders, such as Paul Touvier and Jacques de Bernonville, the Milice was responsible for helping the German forces and police in the repression of the French Resistance and Maquis.

=== Sigmaringen commission ===
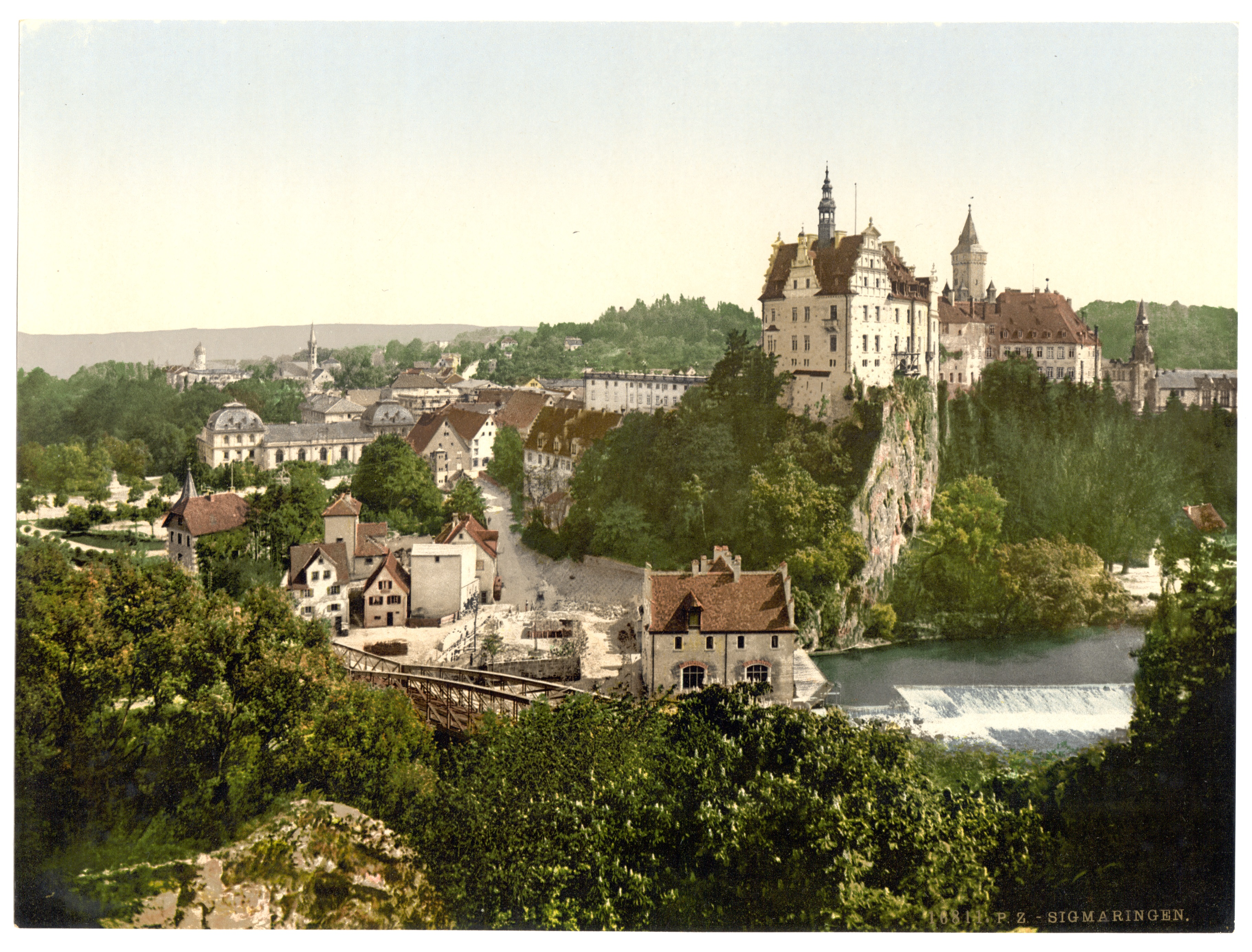
The Sigmaringen operation was based in the city's ancient castle.

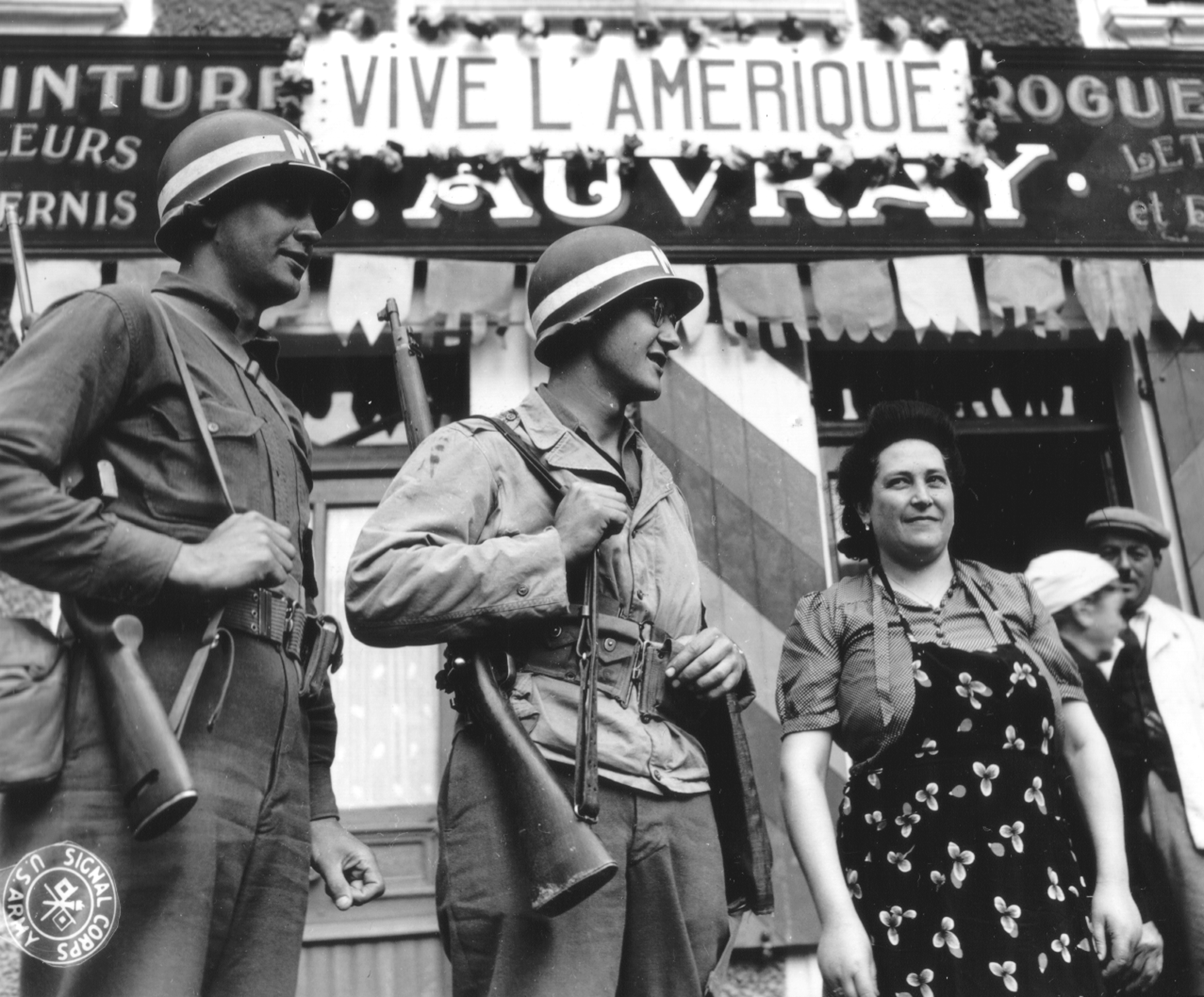
Liberation of France, 1944

Following the liberation of Paris on 25 August 1944, Pétain and his ministers were taken to Sigmaringen by the German forces. After both Pétain and Laval refused to cooperate, Fernand de Brinon was selected by the Germans to establish a pseudo-government in exile at Sigmaringen. Pétain refused to participate further and the Sigmaringen operation had little to no authority. The offices used the official title "French Government Commission for the Defense of National Interests" (French: Commission gouvernementale française pour la défense des intérêts nationaux) and informally was known as the "French Delegation" (French: Délégation française). The enclave had its own radio station (Radio-patrie, Ici la France) and official press (La France, Le Petit Parisien), and hosted the embassies of Axis powers Germany and Japan, as well as an Italian Social Republic consulate. The population of the enclave was about 6,000, including known collaborationist journalists, the writers Louis-Ferdinand Céline and Lucien Rebatet, the actor Robert Le Vigan, and their families, as well as 500 soldiers, 700 French SS, prisoners of war and French civilian forced labourers.

The Commission lasted for seven months, surviving Allied bombing runs, poor nutrition and housing, and a bitterly cold winter where temperatures plunged to −30 °C (−22 °F), while residents nervously watched the advancing Allied troops drawing closer and discussed rumours.

On 21 April 1945 General de Lattre ordered his forces to take Sigmaringen. The end came within days, and by the 26th, Pétain was in the hands of French authorities in Switzerland while Laval had fled to Spain. Brinon, Luchaire, and Darnand were captured, tried, and executed by 1947. Other members escaped to Italy or Spain.

== Aftermath ==
=== Provisional government ===
The Free French, concerned that the Allies might decide to put France under administration of the Allied Military Government for Occupied Territories, strove to establish the Provisional Government of the French Republic quickly. The first action of the Provisional Government was to reestablish republican legality throughout Metropolitan France.

The provisional government considered the Vichy government to have been unconstitutional and all of its actions therefore without legitimate authority. All "constitutional acts, legislative or regulatory" taken by the Vichy government, as well as decrees taken to implement them, were declared null and void by the Ordinance of 9 August 1944. In as much as blanket rescission of all acts taken by Vichy, including measures that might have been taken by a legitimate republican government, was deemed impractical, the order provided that acts not expressly noted as nullified in the order were to continue to receive "provisional application". Many acts were explicitly repealed, including all acts that Vichy had called "constitutional acts", all acts that discriminated against Jews, all acts related to so-called "secret societies" (such as Freemasons), and all acts that established special tribunals.

Collaborationist paramilitary and political organizations, such as the Milice and the Service d'ordre légionnaire, were also dissolved.

The Provisional Government also took steps to replace local governments, including governments that had been suppressed by the Vichy regime through new elections or by extending the terms of those who had been elected not later than 1939.

=== Purges ===
After the liberation, France was swept for a short period with a wave of executions of collaborationists. Some were brought to the Vélodrome d'hiver, Fresnes prison or the Drancy internment camp. Women who were suspected of having romantic liaisons with Germans or more often of being prostitutes who had entertained German customers were publicly humiliated by having their heads shaved. Those who had engaged in the black market were also stigmatised as "war profiteers" (profiteurs de guerre), and popularly called "BOF" (Beurre Oeuf Fromage, or Butter Eggs Cheese, because of the products sold at outrageous prices during the Occupation). The Provisional Government of the French Republic (GPRF, 1944–46) quickly reestablished order, and brought collaborationists before the courts. Many convicted collaborationists were then given amnesty under the Fourth Republic (1946–1954).

Four different periods are distinguished by historians:

- the first phase of mob justice (épuration sauvage – wild purge): extrajudicial executions and shaving of women's heads. Estimations by police prefects made in 1948 and 1952 counted as many as 6,000 executions before the Liberation and 4,000 afterward.
- the second phase (épuration légale or legal purge), which began with Charles de Gaulle's 26 and 27 June 1944 purge ordonnances (de Gaulle's first ordonnance instituting purge Commissions was enacted on 18 August 1943): judgements of collaborationists by the Commissions d'épuration, who condemned approximately 120,000 persons (e.g. Charles Maurras, the leader of the royalist Action Française, was thus condemned to a life sentence on 25 January 1945), including 1,500 death sentences (Joseph Darnand, head of the Milice, and Pierre Laval, head of the French government, were executed after trial on 4 October 1945, Robert Brasillach, executed on 6 February 1945, etc.), but many of those who survived that phase were later given amnesty.
- the third phase, more lenient towards collaborationists (the trial of Philippe Pétain or of writer Louis-Ferdinand Céline).
- finally came the period for amnesty and graces (such as Jean-Pierre Esteva, Xavier Vallat, creator of the General Commission for Jewish Affairs, René Bousquet, head of French police)

Other historians have distinguished the purges against intellectuals (Brasillach, Céline, etc.), industrialists, fighters (LVF etc.) and civil servants (Papon etc.).

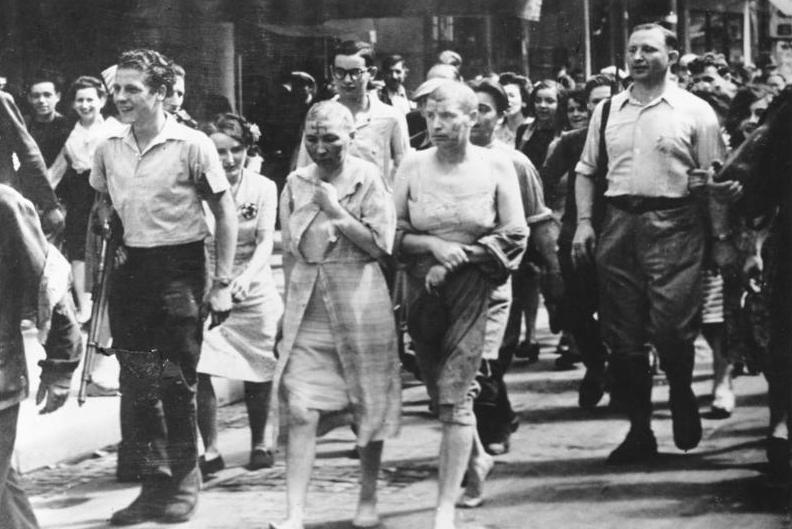
Paris 1944: Women accused of collaboration with Nazis are paraded through the streets; they often had their hair cut off as a form of humiliation.

Philippe Pétain was charged with treason in July 1945. He was convicted and sentenced to death by firing squad, but Charles de Gaulle commuted the sentence to life imprisonment. In the police, some collaborators soon resumed official responsibilities. This continuity of the administration was pointed out, in particular concerning the events of the Paris massacre of 1961, executed under the orders of Paris Police Chief Maurice Papon while Charles de Gaulle was head of state. Papon was tried and convicted for crimes against humanity in 1998.

The French members of the Waffen-SS Charlemagne Division who survived the war were regarded as traitors. Some of the more prominent officers were executed, while the rank-and-file were given prison terms. Some of them were given the option of doing time in Indochina (1946–54) with the Foreign Legion instead of prison.

Among artists, singer Tino Rossi was detained in Fresnes Prison; according to the newspaper Combat, prison guards asked him for autographs. Pierre Benoit and Arletty were also detained.

Executions without trials and other forms of "mob justice" were harshly criticized immediately after the war, with circles close to Pétainists advancing the figures of 100,000 and denouncing the "Red Terror", "anarchy", or "blind vengeance". The writer and Jewish internee Robert Aron estimated the mob executions to a number of 40,000 in 1960. This surprised de Gaulle, who estimated the number to be around 10,000, which is also the figure accepted today by mainstream historians. Approximately 9,000 of these 10,000 refer to summary executions in the whole of the country, which occurred during battle.

Some imply that France did too little to deal with collaborators at this stage by selectively pointing out that in absolute value (numbers), there were fewer legal executions in France than in its smaller neighbour Belgium, and fewer internments than in Norway or the Netherlands, but the situation in Belgium was not comparable as it mixed collaboration with elements of a war of secession. The 1940 invasion prompted the Flemish population to generally side with the Germans in the hope of gaining national recognition, and relative to national population, a much higher proportion of Belgians than French thus ended up collaborating with the Germans or volunteering to fight alongside them. The Walloon population, in turn, led massive anti-Flemish retribution after the war, some of which, such as the execution of Irma Swertvaeger Laplasse, were controversial.

The proportion of collaborators was also higher in Norway, and collaboration occurred on a larger scale in the Netherlands (as in Flanders), based partly on linguistic and cultural commonality with Germany. The internments in Norway and the Netherlands, meanwhile, were highly temporary and rather indiscriminate: there was a brief internment peak in these countries since internment was used partly for the purpose of separating collaborationists from others. Norway ended up executing only 37 collaborationists.

=== 1980s trials ===
Some accused war criminals were judged, some for a second time, from the 1980s onwards: Paul Touvier, Maurice Papon, René Bousquet (the head of the French police during the war) and his deputy Jean Leguay. Bousquet and Leguay were both convicted for their responsibilities in the Vel' d'Hiv Roundup of July 1942. Among others, Nazi hunters Serge and Beate Klarsfeld spent part of their postwar effort trying to bring them before the courts. Some collaborationists then joined the OAS terrorist movement during the Algerian War (1954–62). Jacques de Bernonville escaped to Quebec, then Brazil. Jacques Ploncard d'Assac became counsellor to the Portuguese dictator António de Oliveira Salazar.

In 1993, former Vichy official René Bousquet was assassinated while he awaited prosecution in Paris following a 1991 inculpation for crimes against humanity. He had been prosecuted but partially acquitted and immediately amnestied in 1949. In 1994, former Vichy official Paul Touvier (1915–1996) was convicted of crimes against humanity. Maurice Papon was likewise convicted in 1998 but was released three years later due to ill health and died in 2007.

== Historiographical debates and "Vichy syndrome" ==
As the historian Henry Rousso put it in The Vichy Syndrome (1987), Vichy and the state collaboration of France remains a "past that doesn't pass away".

Historiographical debates are still passionate and oppose different views on the nature and legitimacy of Vichy's collaborationism with Germany in the implementation of the Holocaust. Three main periods have been distinguished in the historiography of Vichy. Firstly, the Gaullist period aimed at national reconciliation and unity under the figure of Charles de Gaulle, who conceived himself above political parties and divisions. Then, the 1960s had Marcel Ophüls's film The Sorrow and the Pity (1971). Finally, in the 1990s, the trial of Maurice Papon, a civil servant in Bordeaux who had been in charge of "Jewish affairs" during the war and was convicted after a very long trial (1981–1998) for crimes against humanity.

Though it is certain that the Vichy government and many of its top administration collaborated in the implementation of the Holocaust, the exact level of such co-operation is still debated. Compared with the Jewish communities established in other countries invaded by Germany, French Jews suffered proportionately lighter losses, but in 1942, repression and deportations started to strike French Jews, not just foreign Jews.

== Notable figures ==
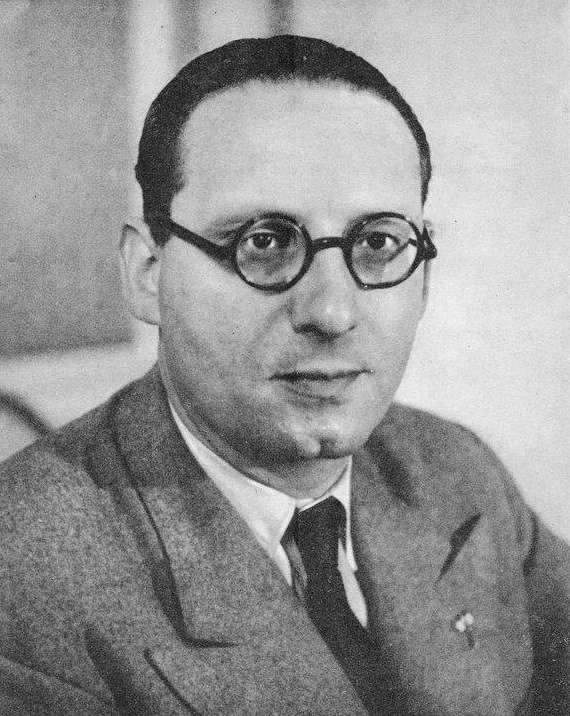
Pierre Pucheu in 1941, who was executed in 1944

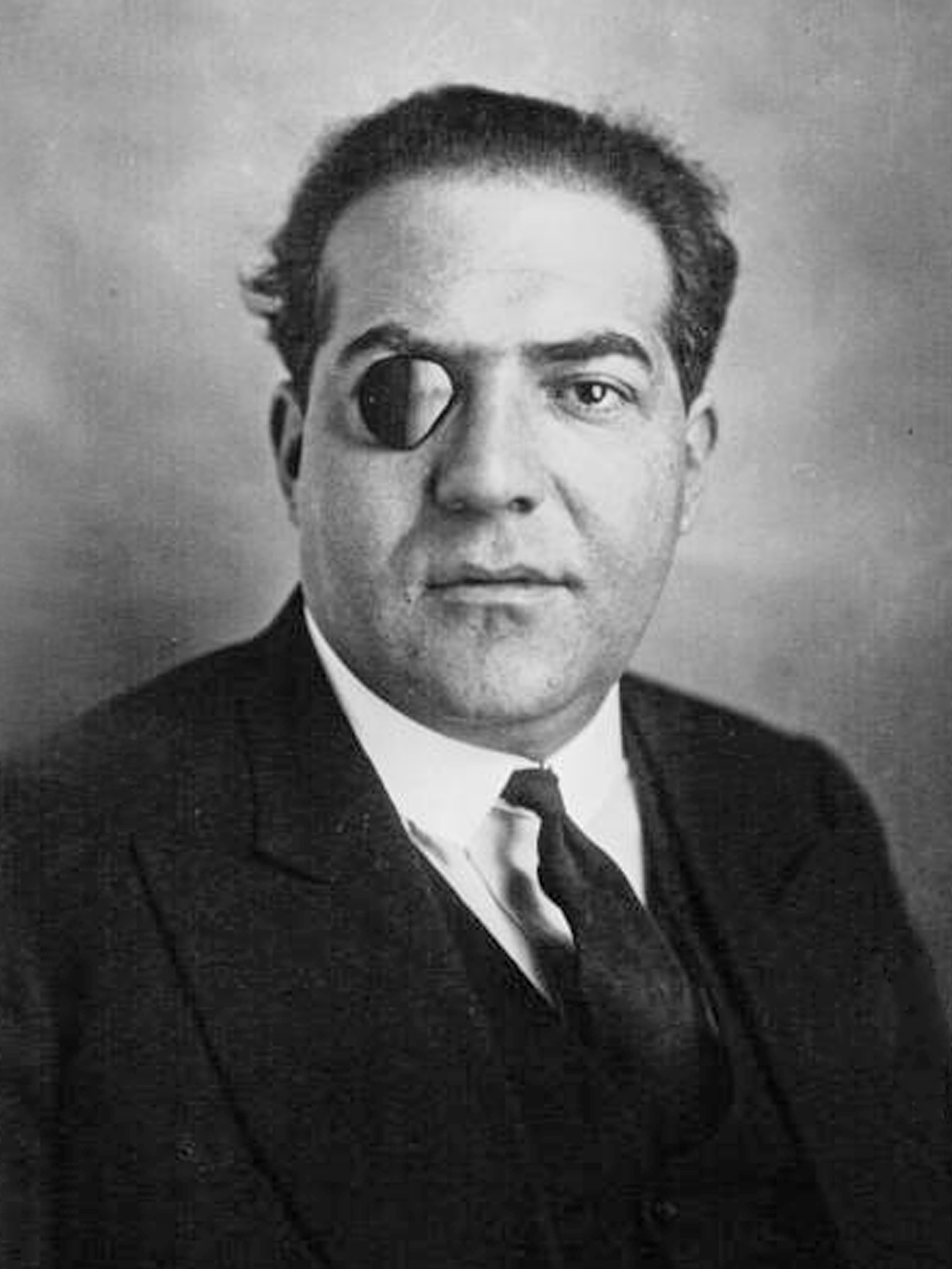
Xavier Vallat

- René Bousquet, head of the French police.
- François Darlan, Prime Minister (1941–1942).
- Louis Darquier de Pellepoix, Commissioner for Jewish Affairs.
- Marcel Déat, founder of the Rassemblement national populaire (RNP) in 1941. Joined the government in the last months of the Occupation.
- Pierre-Étienne Flandin, Prime Minister (1940–1941).
- Philippe Henriot, State Secretary of Information and Propaganda.
- Gaston Henry-Haye, Vichy ambassador to the United States of America.
- Charles Huntziger, general and Minister of War.
- Pierre Laval, Prime Minister (1940, 1942–1944).
- Jean Leguay, delegate of Bousquet in the "free zone", charged with crimes against humanity for his role in the July 1942 Vel' d'Hiv Roundup.
- François Mitterrand, later President of the French Republic (1981–1995)
- Maurice Papon, head of the Jewish Questions Service in the prefecture of Bordeaux. Condemned for crimes against humanity in 1998.
- Philippe Pétain, Head of State.
- Pierre Pucheu, Minister of the Interior.
- Simon Sabiani, head of the Parti Populaire Français in Marseille.
- Paul Touvier, condemned in 1995 for crimes against humanity for his role as head of the Milice in Lyon.
- Xavier Vallat, Commissioner General for Jewish Questions.
- Maxime Weygand, Commander-in-Chief of the armed forces and Minister of Defense.

== Non-Vichy collaborationists ==
- Pierre Bonny, also known as Pierre Bony.
- Robert Brasillach, writer, executed for collaboration after the war.
- Marcel Bucard, founder of the far-right Mouvement franciste and Legion des volontaires francais contre le bolchevisme (LVF).
- Louis-Ferdinand Céline, writer.
- Eugène Deloncle, co-founder of the right-wing terrorist group La Cagoule in 1935 and fascist Mouvement social révolutionnaire in 1940.
- Jacques Doriot, founder of the Parti Populaire Français (PPF) and member of the LVF.
- Maurice Dorléac, actor, charged with national indignity in 1945 by the Civic Court of Paris and sentenced to a six-month prohibition on working in theatre and cinema for doing Nazi propaganda broadcasts for Radio Paris.
- Pierre Drieu La Rochelle, writer.
- Henri Lafont
- Étienne Leandri, wore the Gestapo uniform during the war and participated in the creation of the Gaullist Service d'Action Civique (SAC) in the 1960s.
- Robert Le Vigan, actor.
- Charles Maurras, writer and founder of royalist movement Action Française.
- Lucien Rebatet, writer.
- Pierre Taittinger, chairman of the municipal council of Paris 1943–1944.

== See also ==
- Amy Elizabeth Thorpe
- Cadix, Allied intelligence center in Uzès
- Camp of Septfonds
- Collaboration with Nazi Germany and Fascist Italy
- German occupation of France during World War II
- Government of Vichy France
- Italian occupation of France
- List of French possessions and colonies
- Luftflotte 3
- Military history of France during World War II
- Oradour-sur-Glane
- Organisation Todt
- Refugee workers in Vichy France
- World War II in the Basque Country
- History of the Departmental Council of Loiret

== Bibliography ==
=== English ===
- Atkin, Nicholas, Pétain, (Longman, 1997)
- Azema, Jean-Pierre. From Munich to Liberation 1938–1944 (The Cambridge History of Modern France) (1985)
- Azema, Jean-Pierre, ed. Collaboration and Resistance: Images of Life in Vichy France 1940–1944 (2000) 220pp; photographs
- Boyd, Douglas. Voices from the Dark Years: The Truth About Occupied France 1940–1945 (The History Press, 2015)
- Burrin, Philippe. France Under the Germans: Collaboration and Compromise (1998)
- Carmen Callil Bad Faith. A Forgotten History of Family, Fatherland and Vichy France. New York: Knopf. 2006. ISBN 0-375-41131-3; Biography of Louis Darquier de Pellepoix, the Commissioner for Jewish Affairs
- Campbell, Caroline. "Gender and Politics in Interwar and Vichy France." Contemporary European History 27.3 (2018): 482–499. online
- Christofferson, Thomas R.; Christofferson, Michael S. (2006). France during World War II: From Defeat to Liberation (2nd ed.). Archived from the original on 14 December 2019 – via Questia.
- Curtis, Michael (2014) [2002]. Verdict on Vichy: Power and Prejudice in the Vichy France Regime. Simon & Schuster.
- Davies, Peter. France and the Second World War: Resistance, Occupation and Liberation (Introduction to History) (2000) 128pp excerpt and text search
- Diamond, Hanna. Women and the Second World War in France, 1939–1948: Choices and Constraints (1999)
- Diamond, Hanna, and Simon Kitson, eds. Vichy, Resistance, Liberation: New Perspectives on Wartime France (2005) online edition Archived 5 August 2020 at the Wayback Machine; online review Archived 24 April 2018 at the Wayback Machine
- Fogg, Shannon Lee. The Politics of Everyday Life in Vichy France: Foreigners, Undesirables, and Strangers (2009), 226pp excerpt and text search
- Gildea, Robert. Marianne in Chains: Daily Life in the Heart of France During the German Occupation (2004) excerpt and text search
- Glass, Charles, Americans in Paris: Life and Death Under Nazi Occupation (2009) excerpt and text search
- Gordon, B. Historical Dictionary of World War Two France: The Occupation, Vichy and the Resistance, 1938–1946 (Westport, Conn., 1998)
- Halls, W. D. (1995). Politics, Society and Christianity in Vichy France. Archived from the original on 13 December 2019 – via Questia.
- Holman, Valerie; Kelly, Debra (2000). France at War in the Twentieth Century: Propaganda, Myth, and Metaphor. Contemporary France (Providence, R.I.). New York: Berghahn Books. ISBN 978-1-57181-701-3. OCLC 41497185.
- Jackson, Julian T. (2001). France: The Dark Years, 1940–1944. Oxford University Press. ISBN 978-0-19-820706-1.
- Jennings, Eric (1994). "'Reinventing Jeanne': The Iconology of Joan of Arc in Vichy Schoolbooks, 1940–44". The Journal of Contemporary History. 29 (4): 711–734. doi:10.1177/002200949402900406. S2CID 159656095.
- Kedward, H. R. Occupied France: Collaboration and Resistance (Oxford, 1985), short survey
- Kitson, Simon, The Hunt for Nazi Spies: Fighting Espionage in Vichy France, (University of Chicago Press, 2008). ISBN 978-0-226-43893-1.
- Kocher, Adam, Adria K. Lawrence and Nuno P. Monteiro. 2018. "Nationalism, Collaboration, and Resistance: France under Nazi Occupation." International Security 43(2): 117–150.
- Kooreman, Megan. The Expectation of Justice: France, 1944–1946. (Duke University Press. 1999)
- Kroener, Bernhard R.; Muller, Rolf-Dieter; Umbreit, Hans (2000). Germany and the Second World War: Volume 5: Organization and Mobilization of the German Sphere of Power. Part I: Wartime Administration, Economy, and Manpower Resources, 1939–1941. Germany & Second World War. OUP Oxford. p. iii. ISBN 978-0-19-160683-0. OCLC 1058510505.
- Lackerstein, Debbie. National Regeneration in Vichy France: Ideas and Policies, 1930–1944 (2013) excerpt and text search
- Langer, William, Our Vichy gamble, (1947); U.S. policy 1940–42
- Larkin, Maurice. France since the Popular Front: Government and People 1936–1996 (Oxford U P 1997). ISBN 0-19-873151-5
- Lemmes, Fabian. "Collaboration in wartime France, 1940–1944", European Review of History (2008), 15#2 pp 157–177
- Levieux, Eleanor (1999). Insiders' French : beyond the dictionary. Chicago: University of Chicago Press. ISBN 978-0-226-47502-8.
- Manow, Philip. "Workers, farmers and Catholicism: A history of political class coalitions and the south-European welfare state regime". Journal of European Social Policy (2015) 25#1 pp: 32–49.
- Marrus, Michael R.; Paxton, Robert (1995). Vichy France and the Jews. Stanford University Press. Archived from the original on 11 October 2017 – via Questia.
- Martin Mauthner. Otto Abetz and His Paris Acolytes – French Writers Who Flirted with Fascism, 1930–1945. (Sussex Academic Press, 2016). ISBN 978-1-84519-784-1
- Melton, George E. Darlan: Admiral and Statesman of France, 1881–1942. (Praeger, 1998). ISBN 0-275-95973-2.
- Mockler, Anthony (1984). Haile Selassie's War: The Italian−Ethiopian Campaign, 1935–1941. New York: Random House. ISBN 978-0-394-54222-5.
- Nord, Philip. France's New Deal: From the Thirties to the Postwar Era (Princeton U.P., 2010)
- Michel, Alain (2014) [1st pub. 2011]. "10 Collaboration and collaborators in Vichy France: An unfinished debate". In Stauber, Roni (ed.). Collaboration with the Nazis: Public Discourse after the Holocaust. Routledge Jewish Studies series. London: Routledge. ISBN 978-1138788770. OCLC 876293139.
- Mouré, Kenneth (2010). "Food Rationing and the Black Market in France (1940–1944)". French History. 24 (2): 262–282. doi:10.1093/fh/crq025. PMID 20672479.
- Paxton, Robert O. Vichy France: Old Guard and New Order, 1940–1944 (2nd ed. 2001) excerpt and text search; influential survey
- Playfair, Major-General I. S. O.; with Stitt, Commander G. M. S.; Molony, Brigadier C. J. C. & Toomer, Air Vice-Marshal S. E. (1954). Butler, J. R. M. (ed.). The Mediterranean and Middle East: The Early Successes Against Italy (to May 1941). History of the Second World War, United Kingdom Military Series. Vol. I. HMSO. OCLC 494123451.
- Playfair, I. S. O.; et al. (2004) [1956]. Butler, J. R. M. (ed.). The Mediterranean and Middle East: The Germans Come to the Help of their Ally (1941). History of the Second World War, United Kingdom Military Series. Vol. II (pbk. repr. Naval & Military Press, Uckfield ed.). London: HMSO. ISBN 978-1-84574-066-5.
- Pollard, Miranda. Reign of virtue: mobilising gender in Vichy France (University of Chicago Press, 2012)
- Raugh, H. E. (1993). Wavell in the Middle East, 1939–1941: A Study in Generalship. London: Brassey's. ISBN 978-0-08-040983-2.
- Reggiani, Andrés Horacio (2002). "Alexis Carrel, the Unknown: Eugenics and Population Research under Vichy". French Historical Studies. 25 (2): 331–356. doi:10.1215/00161071-25-2-331. ISSN 1527-5493. Archived from the original on 4 February 2007.
- Smith, Colin. England's Last War Against France: Fighting Vichy, 1940–1942, London, Weidenfeld, 2009. ISBN 978-0-297-85218-6
- Spotts, Frederic (2008). The Shameful Peace: How French Artists and Intellectuals Survived the Nazi Occupation. New Haven and London: Yale University Press.
- Sutherland, Jonathan, and Diane Canwell. Vichy Air Force at War: The French Air Force that Fought the Allies in World War II (Pen & Sword Aviation, 2011)
- Sweets, John F., Choices in Vichy France: The French Under Nazi Occupation (New York, 1986) excerpt and text search, focus on city of Clermont-Ferrand
- Thomas, Martin, The French Empire at War, 1940–45, Manchester University Press, 1998, paperback 2007.
- Vinen, Richard. The Unfree French: Life Under the Occupation (2007)
- Weisberg, Richard H. Vichy Law and the Holocaust in France. New York University Press, 1998. ISBN 0-8147-9336-3

=== Historiography ===
- Conan, Eric, and Henry Rousso. Vichy: An ever-present past (UP of New England, 1998)
- Fishman, Sarah; et al. (2000). France at War: Vichy and the Historians. Archived from the original on 5 August 2020 – via Questia.
- Golsan, Richard J. Vichy's Afterlife: History & Counterhistory in Postwar France (2000)
- Gordon, Bertram M. "The 'Vichy Syndrome' problem in history", French Historical Studies (1995) 19#2 pp 495–518, on the denial of the realities of Vichy in JSTOR
- Munholland, Kim. "Wartime France: Remembering Vichy", French Historical Studies (1994) 18#3 pp. 801–820 in JSTOR
- Poznanski, Renée. "Rescue of the Jews and the Resistance in France: From History to Historiography", French Politics, Culture and Society (2012) 30#2 pp 8–32.
- Rousso, Henry. The Vichy Syndrome: History and Memory in France since 1944. (2nd ed. 2006). ISBN 0-674-93539-X
- Singer, Barnett (Summer 2009). "The Changing Image of Vichy in France". Contemporary Review. Vol. 291, no. 1693. Archived from the original on 8 August 2020 – via Questia.

=== French ===
- Henri Amouroux, La grande histoire des Français sous l'Occupation, 8 volumes, Laffont, 1976
- Aron, Robert (1962). "Pétain : sa carrière, son procès" [Pétain: his career, his trial]. Grands dossiers de l'histoire contemporaine [Major issues in contemporary history] (in French). Paris: Librairie Académique Perrin. OCLC 1356008.
- Jean-Pierre Azéma & François Bedarida, Vichy et les Français, Paris, Fayard, 1996.
- Le régime de Vichy et les Français (dir. Jean-Pierre Azéma & François Bédarida, Institut d'histoire du temps présent), Fayard, 1992, ISBN 2-213-02683-1
- Béglé, Jérôme (20 January 2014). "Rentrée littéraire – Avec Pierre Assouline, Sigmaringen, c'est la vie de château !" [Autumn publishing season launch – With Pierre Assouline, Sigmaringen, That's life in the castle]. Le Point (in French). Le Point Communications.
- Bentégeat, Hervé (2014). Et surtout, pas un mot à la Maréchale ... : Pétain et ses femmes [And above all, not a word to the Maréchale ... : Pétain and his women] (in French). Paris: Albin Michel. ISBN 978-2226256911. OCLC 1015992303.
- Michèle Cointet. Dictionnaire historique de la France sous l'Occupation (2nd ed. 2000) 732pp
- Michèle Cointet. L'Eglise sous Vichy. 1940–1945. La repentance en question., Perrin, Paris, 1998. ISBN 2-262-01231-8
- Cointet, Jean-Paul (2014). Sigmaringen. Tempus (in French). Paris: Perrin. ISBN 978-2-262-03300-2.
- Eric Conan et Henry Rousso. Vichy, un passé qui ne passe pas, Fayard, Paris, 1994, ISBN 2-213-59237-3
- Yves Maxime Danan, La vie politique à Alger, de 1940 à 1944, L.G.D.J., Paris 1963.
- Jean-Luc Einaudi (2001). Les silences de la police : 16 juillet 1942–17 octobre 1961 (in French). Paris: L'Esprit frappeur. ISBN 978-2-84405-173-8.
- Delporte, Christian; Moine, Caroline (2018). Culture, médias, pouvoirs aux Etats-Unis et en Europe occidentale, France, Italie, RFA, Royaume-Uni, 1945–1991 [Culture, Media, Power in the United States and Western Europe, 1945–1991] (in French). Malakoff: Armand Colin. ISBN 978-2200624187. OCLC 1191067431.
- André Kaspi. Les Juifs pendant l'Occupation, Seuil, Paris, 1991, ISBN 2-02-013509-4
- Serge Klarsfeld. Vichy-Auschwitz. Le rôle de Vichy dans la solution finale de la question juive en France. 1943–1944., Fayard, Paris, 1985, ISBN 2-213-01573-2
- Launay, Jacques de. Le Dossier de Vichy, in series, Collection Archives, [Éditions] Julliard, [Paris], 1967. N.B.: A documentary history.
- Herbert R. Lottman. Pétain. Seuil, 1984, ISBN 2-02-006763-3
- Rousso, Henry (2007). Le régime de Vichy [The Vichy Regime]. Que sais-je ? n° 1720 (in French). Paris: Presses Universitaires de France. ISBN 978-2-13-054077-9. OCLC 777999316.
- Jacques Sabille. "Les Juifs de Tunisie sous Vichy et l'Occupation". Paris: Edition du Centre de Documentation Juive Contemporaine, 1954
- Sémelin, Jacques (2013). Persécutions et entraides dans la France occupée : comment 75 % des juifs de France ont échappé à la mort (in French). Paris: Seuil Arènes. ISBN 978-2-35204-235-8.

=== German ===
- Eberhard Jäckel: Frankreich in Hitlers Europa: die deutsche Frankreichpolitik im 2. Weltkrieg, Stuttgart 1966.
- Martin Jungius: Der verwaltete Raub. Die "Arisierung" der Wirtschaft in Frankreich 1940–1944. Thorbecke, Ostfildern 2008, Beiheft der Francia Nr. 67, hrsg. von Deutschen Historischen Institut Paris.
- Michael Mayer: Staaten als Täter. Ministerialbürokratie und 'Judenpolitik' in NS-Deutschland und Vichy-Frankreich. Ein Vergleich. Preface by Horst Möller and Georges-Henri Soutou München, Oldenbourg, 2010 (Studien zur Zeitgeschichte; 80). ISBN 978-3-486-58945-0. (Comparative study of anti-Jewish policy implemented by the government in Nazi-Germany, by German occupational forces in France and by the semi-autonomic French government in Vichy)
- Rousso, Henry (2009) [1st pub. 2007 Le Régime de Vichy]. Vichy: Frankreich unter deutscher Besatzung; 1940–1944 [Vichy: France under the Occupation: 1940–1944]. Beck'sche Reihe (in German). Munich: C.H. Beck. ISBN 978-3-406-58454-1. OCLC 316118163.

=== Films ===
- Marcel Ophüls, The Sorrow and the Pity (1969).
- Claude Chabrol, The Eye of Vichy (1993).
