= Second law on the status of Jews =

Antisemitic law in Vichy France

The Second French Statute on the Status of Jews, of 2 June 1941 (Loi du 2 juin 1941, Statut des Juifs), was an antisemitic law enacted under Vichy France and signed into law by the Head of the French State, Marshal Philippe Pétain. It replaced the first Law on the status of Jews of 3 October 1940. It included an increasingly stringent definition of who was a Jew in France. It specified a legal definition, of the term Jewish race, broadening its criteria for inclusion and extending the scope of the existing professional prohibitions. From that point on, Jews in France became second-class citizens, while they had since 21 September 1791 been full citizens.

== Purpose and scope ==
Published in the Journal officiel de l'État français on 14 June 1941 during the Darlan government, the Second law on the status of Jews linked membership in the "Jewish race" to the religion of the grandparents. At the same time, in line with an assimilationist ideology invented by Charles Maurras and promoted by Action Française between the wars, it multiplied the exceptions for those who had made themselves useful to the nation and the prohibitions for those who had not.

Applicable throughout the French Empire, in metropolitan France, in the northern and southern zones, and in Algeria, it concerned around 150,000 French Jews and as many foreigners. Its numerous clauses decreed a policy of quotas in France.

== Context ==
This statute was part of a series of laws against Jews and foreigners passed between 1938 and 1944. Between July 1940 and August 1944, the Vichy government produced 143 laws and regulatory acts relating to the condition of Jews. The first definition of the term "Jewish race", logically imperfect, was enacted under the government of Pierre Laval on 3 October 1940 by the law on the status of Jews. The second statute refined this definition:

A person, regardless of current religious affiliation, who is descended from at least three grandparents of the Jewish race, or from just two if his or her spouse descends from two grandparents of the Jewish race. A grandparent who practiced the Jewish religion is considered to have been of the Jewish race

It also allowed only one means of establishing non-Jewishness, Robert Paxton and Michael Martus noted, "proof of adherence to one of the other confessions recognized by the state before the law of 9 December 1905," which abolished ties between the church and the state.

"Returning France to the French" meant excluding French Jews "from medical and legal professions, from owning property and operating businesses, from education, from the movie industry and the media and all other aspects of society, culture, politics and the economy where their alleged power and influence by definition threatened or had already undermined the power and influence of "true Frenchmen."

The two successive statutes were in effect during the occupation, mainly from April 1942 onwards. The allocation of resources to the Commissariat-General for Jewish Affairs implemented a corporatist and "racial" antisemitic policy within the framework of the Révolution nationale. They subsequently served as the legal basis for the collaboration of the French police in the deportation of Jews from Europe, North Africa, and the Levant.

== Companion legislation on the registration of Jews ==
Dated the same day and published on the same day (18 June 1941) was another closely related law The Law of 2 June 1941 on the Compulsory Registration of the Jews requiring that Jews report their names and situations to local authorities.

== Texts ==
=== In the original French ===
- "Loi du 2 juin 1941 remplaçant celle du 3 octobre 1940 portant statut des Juifs". Journal Officiel de l'État Français (in French). 164 (2332). Yad Vashem Institut international pour la mémoire de la Shoah: 2475. 2 June 1941.
- https://gallica.bnf.fr/ark:/12148/bpt6k20323582/f3.item,
- immediately followed, on page 2476, by No. 2333, the Law of 2 June 1941, Prescribing the Census of Jews, https://gallica.bnf.fr/ark:/12148/bpt6k20323582/f4.item

=== English translation ===
- https://en.wikisource.org/wiki/Translation:Second_law_on_the_status_of_Jews

== See also ==
- Union générale des israélites de France
- Vichy Holocaust collaboration timeline
- Police collaboration in Vichy France
- Natural person in French law
- Vichy anti-Jewish legislation
