= Law regarding foreign nationals of the Jewish race =

Antisemitic law in Vichy France

- Long title: Law of 4 October 1940 regarding foreign nationals of the Jewish race Loi du 4 octobre 1940 relative aux ressortissants étrangers de race juive
- Territorial extent: French State
- Signed by: Philippe Pétain
- Signed: 4 October 1940
- Effective: 4 October 1940

Related legislation
- numerous regulations

Summary
- foreign Jews subject to forced internment or reassignment of residence
- Status: Void ab initio

The Law of 4 October 1940 regarding foreign nationals of the Jewish race was a law enacted by the Vichy regime, which authorized and organized the internment of foreign Jews and marked the beginning of the policy of collaboration of the Vichy regime with Nazi Germany's plans for the extermination of the Jews of Europe. The law was published in the Journal officiel de la République française on 18 October 1940.

The law was signed by Marshall Philippe Pétain and the principal members of his government, one day after the Law on the status of Jews provided a legal definition of the expression Jewish race and contained a list of occupations forbidden to Jews.

Vichy France was nominally independent from Germany, unlike the northern Occupied Zone, which was under direct occupation by Germany. However, Pétain's regime did not wait for German orders to draw up antisemitic measures. Instead, it but took them on their own initiative. Antisemitic measures began to be drawn up almost immediately after Pétain had signed the Armistice of 22 June 1940, which ended hostilities and established the terms of the Germans occupation, including the division of France into the occupied and free zones.

== See also ==
- Collaboration with the Axis Powers during World War II
- French Fourth Republic
- French Third Republic
- German occupation of France
- History of the Jews in France
- Vichy anti-Jewish legislation
- Vichy France
- Vichy Holocaust collaboration timeline
- Zone libre

== Works cited ==
- Epstein, Mortimer (1942). "The Statesman's Year-Book : Statistical and Historical Annual of the States of the World for the Year 1942". The Statesman's Year-Book. 79. Palgrave Macmillan. OCLC 1086492287. "Legal position of Jews in Vichy France.—Almost immediately after the armistice, the Vichy government proclaimed its intention to deprive of their civil rights French people who are of Jewish faith or origin, and to place the Jews in the position of legal inferiority in which they find themselves in all other German-dominated countries. On October 3, 1940 (Journel Officiel of October 18), a law was published fixing the conditions under which a person is considered as being of Jewish origin. Access to all public offices, professions, journalism, executive positions in the film industry, etc. was prohibited to all such persons."
- Fresco, Nadine (4 March 2021) [1st pub. La mort des juifs. Paris : Seuil, 2008]. On the Death of Jews: Photographs and History. Translated by Clift, Sarah. New York: Berghahn Books. ISBN 978-1-78920-882-5. OCLC 1226797554. "On the preceding page, the law from the day before (3 October 1940), signed by Marshall Philip Pétain and nine of his ministers, is the 'law on the status of the Jews.' We know that those in charge of Vichy, 'complicit even before having understood the inevitable extent of their own compromise', did not wait for it to be imposed by the occupying power before enacting it.^{73} We also know that whereas the German ordinance of the preceding month defined Jews by 'religion', the French statute of 3 October defined them by race.^{74}"
- Geddes, Andrew; Favell, Adrian (1999). The Politics of Belonging: Migrants and Minorities in Contemporary Europe (government pub.). Contemporary trends in European social sciences. Aldershot: Ashgate. ISBN 978-1-84014-177-1. OCLC 470276345. "The laws of October 1940 organized and entrenched discrimination towards Jews and foreigners (law of October 3 1940 concerning the status of Jews; law of October 4 1940 concerning ' alien residents of the Jewish race'."
- Klarsfeld, Serge (1983). Memorial to the Jews Deported from France, 1942-1944: Documentation of the Deportation of the Victims of the Final Solution in France. B. Klarsfeld Foundation. OCLC 970847660. "3) A law of October 3, 1940, on the status of Jews excluded them from most public and private professions and defined Jews on the basis of racial criteria."
- Rayski, Adam; Bédarida, François; Sayers, Will; United States Holocaust Memorial Museum (2005). The Choice of the Jews Under Vichy: Between Submission and Resistance. University of Notre Dame Press. ISBN 978-0-268-04021-5. OCLC 954784575. ""on 3 October, Vichy promulgated the 'Law Concerning the Status of Jews,' signed by Pétain and the principal members of his government."
- Rémy, Dominique (1992). Les lois de Vichy: actes dits 'lois' de l'autorité de fait se prétendant 'gouvernement de l'Etat français' [The Vichy laws: acts called 'laws' of the de facto authority claiming to be the 'government of the French state'] (in French). Editions Romillat. ISBN 978-2-87894-026-8. OCLC 1038535440.
