= October 1940 =

Month of 1940

| << | October 1940 | | | | | >> |
| Su | Mo | Tu | We | Th | Fr | Sa |
| | | 1 | 2 | 3 | 4 | 5 |
| 6 | 7 | 8 | 9 | 10 | 11 | 12 |
| 13 | 14 | 15 | 16 | 17 | 18 | 19 |
| 20 | 21 | 22 | 23 | 24 | 25 | 26 |
| 27 | 28 | 29 | 30 | 31 |

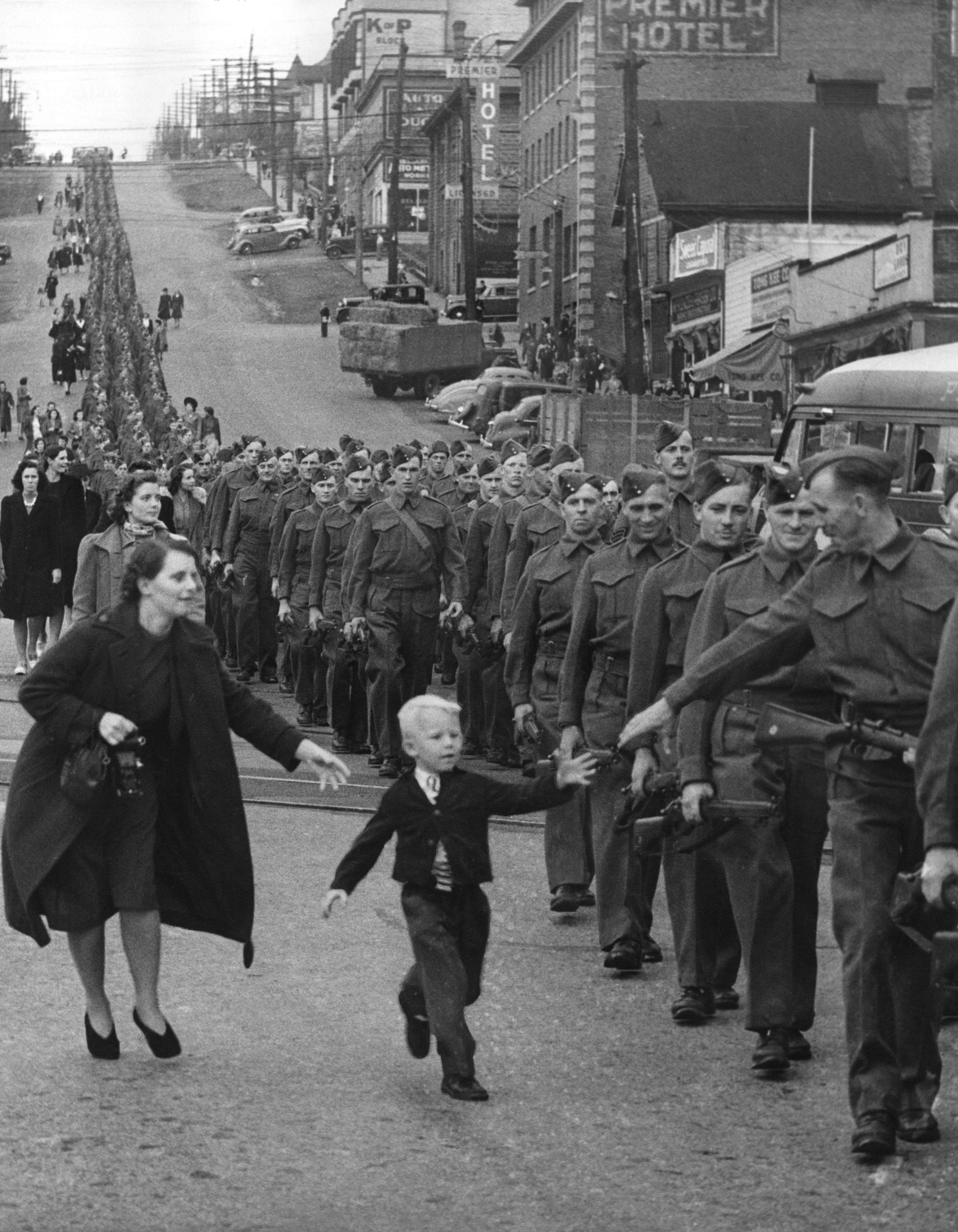
October 1, 1940: Wait for Me, Daddy.

The following events occurred in October 1940:

== October 1, 1940 (Tuesday) ==
- The Wait for Me, Daddy photo was taken of The British Columbia Regiment (Duke of Connaught's Own Rifles) by Claude P. Dettloff in New Westminster, Canada.
- Albert Einstein received his final American citizenship papers.
- The Pennsylvania Turnpike, the world's first long-distance controlled-access highway, opened to the public.
- Born:
  - Laura Bergt, Alaska Native activist and model, in Candle, Alaska (d. 1984)
  - Richard Corben, illustrator and comic book artist, in Anderson, Missouri (d. 2020)

== October 2, 1940 (Wednesday) ==
- The Italian submarine Berillo was scuttled after it was attacked by British destroyers in the Mediterranean Sea.
- German submarine U-144 was commissioned.
- Born: Prince Muhammad bin Talal of Jordan, in Amman (d. 2021)

== October 3, 1940 (Thursday) ==
- Vichy France passed antisemitic legislation excluding Jews from most public and private occupations.
- Neville Chamberlain stepped down as Lord President of the Council due to failing health.
- Warsaw's Jews were directed to move into the Warsaw ghetto.
- Born: Jean Ratelle, ice hockey player, at Lac Saint-Jean, Quebec, Canada

== October 4, 1940 (Friday) ==
- Adolf Hitler and Benito Mussolini met at the Brenner Pass to discuss a strategy that included the possibility of Francoist Spain entering the war on their side. Mussolini had already decided to attack Greece and hinted at his intention by speaking scornfully of the attitude of the "double-dealing" Greek government, but Hitler brushed such talk aside and said that the Axis powers should avoid any initiative that was not "absolutely useful." Hitler did not reveal his intention to attack the Soviet Union.
- The Italian merchant ship Antonietta Costa collided with an unidentified vessel near Bari. It is believed that this was the British submarine Rainbow which sank.
- Herbert Morrison became UK Home Secretary.
- Fritzie Zivic beat Henry Armstrong for the world welterweight boxing title at Madison Square Garden.
- The biographical film Knute Rockne, All American starring Pat O'Brien and Ronald Reagan premiered in South Bend, Indiana.
- Born: Steve Swallow, jazz bassist and composer, in Fair Lawn, New Jersey

== October 5, 1940 (Saturday) ==
- Richard Peirse replaced Charles Portal as Commander-in-Chief of Bomber Command in the British Royal Air Force.
- Died: Ballington Booth, 83, Officer of the Salvation Army and co-founder of Volunteers of America; Lincoln Loy McCandless, 81, American industrialist and politician; Silvestre Revueltas, 40, Mexican composer, violinist and conductor (pneumonia)

== October 6, 1940 (Sunday) ==
- Mussolini made a surprise inspection of armed forces in northern Italy as the Fascist press predicted that "something big" was coming soon.
- Born: Sukumari, film actress, in Nagercoil, British India (d. 2013)

== October 7, 1940 (Monday) ==
- The Royal Air Force conducted its heaviest raid on Berlin to date.
- The No. 80 (Signals) Wing was formed, the RAF's first electronic warfare unit.
- The McCollum memo was sent by Lieutenant Commander Arthur H. McCollum, outlining steps that the United States could take to not provoke Japan into committing an act of war.

== October 8, 1940 (Tuesday) ==
- A large number of German troops entered Romania to train the Romanian Army and protect the country's oil fields. Romania was now effectively under German occupation.
- Charles de Gaulle arrived in Douala, French Cameroons.
- The Cincinnati Reds won the World Series, edging the Detroit Tigers 2-1 in the seventh and decisive game.
- German submarine U-107 was commissioned.
- The John Ford-directed drama film The Long Voyage Home starring John Wayne, Thomas Mitchell and Ian Hunter premiered at the Rivoli Theatre in New York City.
- Died: Josef František, DFM & Bar, 26, Czech fighter pilot (plane crash)

== October 9, 1940 (Wednesday) ==
- Winston Churchill was elected head of the Conservative Party following the retirement of Neville Chamberlain.
- The Nazi administration in the occupied Netherlands banned Jews and half-Jews from public employment.
- Born: John Lennon, singer and songwriter (The Beatles), in Liverpool, England (d. 1980)
- Died: Wilfred Grenfell, 75, English medical missionary to Newfoundland and Labrador

== October 10, 1940 (Thursday) ==
- Hitler inaugurated an emergency program called the Luftschutz-Sofortprogramm to build protective shelters for the civilian population and essential personnel. Aiming to build 6,000 bunkers across 92 cities, it was the largest public works program in history.
- Fulgencio Batista became the 9th President of Cuba.
- Born: Stanley Mouse, artist, in Fresno, California
- Died: Berton Churchill, 63, Canadian actor

== October 11, 1940 (Friday) ==
- The British battleship Revenge and six destroyers bombarded Cherbourg.
- Philippe Pétain gave a radio address suggesting to the French people that they reconsider their historic view of who was friend and who was foe among the European nations.
- The Technicolor musical film Down Argentine Way was released, introducing Carmen Miranda to the American public and making a star out of Betty Grable.
- Died: Santōka Taneda, 57, Japanese poet

== October 12, 1940 (Saturday) ==
- The Battle of Cape Passero was fought southeast of Sicily. The Royal Navy clashed with several Italian ships which attacked them after a convoy mission to Malta, resulting in British victory.
- German submarine U-98 was commissioned.
- Died: Tom Mix, 60, American film actor (auto accident)

== October 13, 1940 (Sunday) ==
- 14-year old Princess Elizabeth made her first public speech, a radio address to the children of the British Commonwealth. Her ten-year-old sister Princess Margaret joined in at the end.
- Vichy France abolished departmental councils.
- Born: Pharoah Sanders, jazz saxophonist, in Little Rock, Arkansas (d. 2022)

== October 14, 1940 (Monday) ==
- The Nationality Act of 1940 was signed into law in the United States.
- A German bomb exploded on the road above Balham station in south London, creating a large crater which a double-decker bus drove into during blackout conditions. A total of 66 people were killed and pictures of the bus in the crater were published around the world.
- King George VI and Queen Elizabeth visited Neville Chamberlain on his deathbed.
- With the United States presidential election three weeks away, Charles Lindbergh made a radio speech attacking the Roosevelt Administration's record and appealing for the election of leaders "whose promises we can trust, who know where they are taking us, and who tell us where we are going." Lindbergh did not directly endorse Wendell Willkie or even mention him by name, but his position was unmistakable.
- Born: Cliff Richard, pop singer and actor, in Lucknow, United Provinces, British India

== October 15, 1940 (Tuesday) ==
- The British submarine Triad was shelled and sunk south of Cape Colonne (Calabria) by the Italian submarine Enrico Toti.
- The Charlie Chaplin satirical film The Great Dictator premiered in New York City.
- Born: Peter C. Doherty, veterinary surgeon and Nobel laureate, in Brisbane, Australia
- Died: Lluís Companys, 58, President of Catalonia (executed)

== October 16, 1940 (Wednesday) ==
- Vichy France outlawed the manufacture, export or movement of war materiel in French territory for the duration of the war.
- The Machita incident began in southern Arizona when U.S. officials raided an O'odham tribe that refused to enlist for the draft.
- Two Air Raid Precautions rescue workers were jailed for one year each at the Old Bailey for looting after they took £16 they found in a bombed-out house.
- Ramón Serrano Suñer was made Foreign Minister of Spain.
- German submarine U-145 was commissioned.
- Draft registration began in the United States.
- Born: Dave DeBusschere, basketball player, in Detroit, Michigan (d. 2003); Ivan Della Mea, novelist, journalist, folk musician and political activist, in Lucca, Italy (d. 2009)

== October 17, 1940 (Thursday) ==
- Nissho Inoue was amnestied and released from prison despite receiving a life sentence in 1934 for his role in the League of Blood Incident.
- Born: Baron von Raschke, professional wrestler, in Omaha, Nebraska
- Died: George Davis, 70, American baseball player and manager; Florence Scovel Shinn, 69, American artist, illustrator and spiritual teacher

== October 18, 1940 (Friday) ==
- Allied convoy SC 7 was intercepted by a U-boat wolfpack in the Western Approaches. 20 of the 35 cargo vessels were sunk in the ensuing battle.
- The British government reopened the Burma Road.
- Vichy France officially published its antisemitic laws.
- The Italian submarine Durbo was scuttled east of Gibraltar after being attacked by the British destroyers Firedrake and Wrestler.

== October 19, 1940 (Saturday) ==
- North Atlantic convoy HX 79 lost 12 ships out of 49 from a U-boat attack.
- British destroyer Venetia struck a mine and sank in the Thames Estuary.
- The Hawaiian Air Force was established at Fort Shafter, Territory of Hawaii.
- "Only Forever" by Bing Crosby hit #1 on the Billboard singles chart.
- Born: Michael Gambon, Irish-born English actor, in Cabra, Dublin (d. 2023)

== October 20, 1940 (Sunday) ==
- Italian planes attacked oilfields in Bahrain and Saudi Arabia.
- The Italian submarine Lafolè was sunk in the Mediterranean Sea by three British destroyers.
- Heinrich Himmler went to Madrid and had a meeting with Francisco Franco.
- Born: Robert Pinsky, poet, essayist, literary critic and translator, in Long Branch, New Jersey

== October 21, 1940 (Monday) ==
- Winston Churchill made a radio broadcast directed to the people of France. In a French-language address he appealed to them not to hinder Britain in the war against Germany, saying that "we are persevering steadfastly and in good heart in the cause of European freedom and fair dealing for the common people of all countries for which, with you, we draw the sword ... Remember, we shall never stop, never weary, and never give in, and that our whole people and empire have bowed themselves to the task of cleansing Europe from the Nazi pestilence and saving the world from the new Dark Ages."
- The Ernest Hemingway novel For Whom the Bell Tolls was published.
- Born: Geoffrey Boycott, cricketer, in Fitzwilliam, West Yorkshire, England; Manfred Mann, rock musician, in Johannesburg, Union of South Africa

== October 22, 1940 (Tuesday) ==
- Hitler and Pierre Laval met for the first time at Montoire-sur-le-Loir.
- After evading French and Spanish authorities, Belgian prime minister Hubert Pierlot arrived in London, marking the beginning of the Belgian government in exile.
- Canadian destroyer HMS Margaree collided with the freighter MV Port Fairy in the Atlantic Ocean and sank.
- German submarine U-108 was commissioned.

== October 23, 1940 (Wednesday) ==
- Meeting at Hendaye: Adolf Hitler and Francisco Franco met at the train station of Hendaye on the Spanish-French border to discuss the conditions under which Spain would join the Axis. After seven hours of talks, Hitler found Spain's demands to be still too high.
- President Roosevelt made a campaign speech in Philadelphia in which he answered many charges from his opponents, including one in particular that he called "outrageously false ... a charge that offends every political and religious conviction that I hold dear. It is the charge that this Administration wishes to lead this country into war." Roosevelt's speech concluded: "We are arming ourselves not for any foreign war. We are arming ourselves not for any purpose of conquest or intervention in foreign disputes. I repeat again that I stand on the platform of our party; 'We will not participate in foreign wars and will not send our Army, naval or air forces to fight in foreign lands outside of the Americas except in case of attack.' It is for peace that I have labored; and it is for peace that I shall labor all the days of my life."
- Born: Pelé, footballer, in Três Corações, Brazil (d. 2022)

== October 24, 1940 (Thursday) ==
- Hitler met with Philippe Pétain at Montoire-sur-le-Loir. Pétain was not willing to have Vichy France enter the war on the side of the Axis but agreed in principle to collaborate with Germany.
- The Italian Air Corps saw its first action during the Battle of Britain.
- British Summer Time was extended through the winter.

== October 25, 1940 (Friday) ==
- The Royal Air Force bombed Hamburg and Berlin.
- The stage musical Cabin in the Sky premiered at the Martin Beck Theatre on Broadway.
- Born: Bobby Knight, college basketball coach, in Massillon, Ohio (d. 2023)
- Died: Oliver Brooks, 51, English soldier and recipient of the Victoria Cross during World War I; Thomas Waddell, 86, Australian politician

== October 26, 1940 (Saturday) ==
- The North American P-51 Mustang had its first flight.
- The Soviet Union occupied the islands in the Danube Delta in Izmail on the grounds that they belonged to Bessarabia.

== October 27, 1940 (Sunday) ==
- Italy's ambassador to Greece issued an ultimatum demanding that Italian troops be allowed to occupy strategic areas in Greece.
- Born: John Gotti, mob boss, in the Bronx, New York (d. 2002)
- Died: Augustyn Łukosz, 56, Polish national activist and socialist politician (died in Mauthausen-Gusen concentration camp)

== October 28, 1940 (Monday) ==
- The Greco-Italian War began when the Italians invaded Greece. October 28 is celebrated as Ohi Day in Greece and Greek communities throughout the world to commemorate Ioannis Metaxas' rejection of the Italian ultimatum.
- The Battle of Pindus began.
- Hitler and Mussolini met in Florence to exchange the latest war information. Hitler might have intended to use the meeting to dissuade Mussolini from attacking Greece had the invasion not, as it turned out, gone ahead that morning. Mussolini was in high spirits and told Hitler, "Don't worry, in two weeks, it will all be over." Hitler wished Mussolini the best of luck and refrained from expressing any disapproval, though after the meeting he fumed to his inner circle that what Mussolini had done was "pure madness" and that he should have attacked Malta instead.
- The troopship Empress of Britain was bombed northwest of Ireland by a German Focke-Wulf Fw 200 Condor long-range bomber, forcing passengers and crew to abandon ship. She was sunk shortly afterwards by a U-boat while being towed to a British port.

== October 29, 1940 (Tuesday) ==
- The British occupied Crete and began to mine the waters around Greece.
- Peacetime conscription under the Selective Training and Service Act of 1940 went into effect in the United States. The first number was drawn in the Selective Service System lottery as Secretary of War Henry Stimson donned a blindfold and pulled out the first numbered capsule from a bowl.

== October 30, 1940 (Wednesday) ==
- Pétain gave a radio address to the French people saying, "It is with honor and in order to maintain French unity, a unity which has lasted ten centuries, and in the framework of the constructive activity of the new European order that today I am embarking on the path of collaboration."
- The United States Selective Service conducted its first peacetime draft lottery.
- German submarine U-32 was sunk northwest of Ireland by depth charges from the British destroyers Harvester and Highlander, just two days after it had torpedoed the Empress of Britain.
- German submarine U-146 was commissioned.
- The Cole Porter musical Panama Hattie had its Broadway premiere at the 46th Street Theatre.
- Born: Charles Fox, film and television composer, in New York City
- Died: Arthur Heming, 70, Canadian painter and novelist

== October 31, 1940 (Thursday) ==
- The Battle of Britain ended. Between August 8 and this date the Luftwaffe lost 2,375 planes while the RAF lost 800.
- The Italian submarine Scirè attacked the British naval base at Gibraltar with manned torpedoes, but none of them deployed successfully and the British were able to recover one for analysis.
- German submarine U-74 was commissioned.
- The Warsaw District government moved all Jews living in Warsaw to the ghettos.
- Born: Craig Rodwell, gay rights activist, in Chicago, Illinois (d. 1993)
- Died:
  - Frank Anstey, 75, Australian politician
  - John Renshaw Carson, 54, American transmission theorist and inventor
  - Harvey Pulford, Canadian multisport athlete
