= Tulard =

Tulard is a surname. Notable people with the surname include:

- André Tulard (1899–1967), French civil servant
- Jean Tulard (born 1933), French historian
