= Louis Darquier de Pellepoix =

French Nazi collaborationist

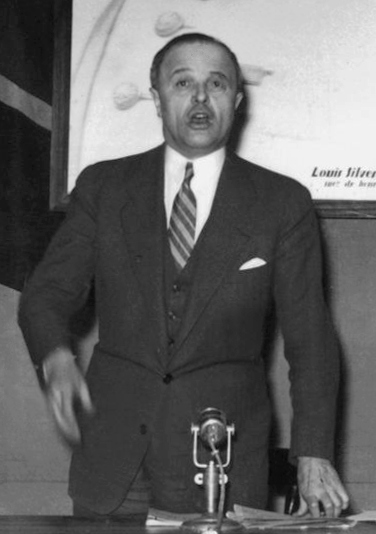
- Darquier in 1942–44

Commissioner-General for Jewish Affairs
- In office 8 May 1942 – 26 February 1944 (1 year, 9 months and 18 days)

Municipal councilor of Paris
- In office 1935 – 1940 (4 or 5 years)

Personal details
- Born: Louis Darquier; 19 December 1887 Cahors, French Republic
- Died: 29 August 1980 (aged 92) Carratraca, near Málaga, Kingdom of Spain
- Party: Action Française
- Profession: Journalist

Louis Darquier (19 December 1897 – 29 August 1980), better known under his assumed name Louis Darquier de Pellepoix, was Commissioner-General for Jewish Affairs under the Vichy Régime.

== Biography ==
A veteran of World War I, Darquier had been active in Fascist and antisemitic politics in France in the 1930s, being a member, at various times, of Action Française, Croix-de-Feu and Jeunesses Patriotes. On 6 February 1934 he was injured at the Place de la Concorde riot, and, according to Janet Maslin, writing in The New York Times in 2006, "parlayed (his) new status as a 'man of 6 February' into a leadership role." The article was based on the publication by Carmen Callil of her highly praised book on Darquier called 'Bad Faith'. During this period Darquier began collaborating with the noted antisemitic publisher Ulrich Fleischhauer's Welt-Dienst (World-Service or Service Mondial) organization based in Erfurt, Germany.

Darquier's extreme views were well-publicized. In 1937, he said, at a public meeting, "We must, with all urgency, resolve the Jewish problem, whether by expulsion, or massacre." A British report in 1942 called him "one of the most notorious anti-semites in France". At Nazi Germany's behest, he was appointed to head Vichy's Commissariat-General for Jewish Affairs in May 1942, succeeding Xavier Vallat, whom the SS in France found too moderate. Darquier's ascent to this post immediately preceded the first mass deportations of Jews from France to concentration camps. He was fired in February 1944 when, in Nicholas Fraser's words, "his greed and incompetence could no longer be countenanced." His successor was Charles du Paty de Clam.

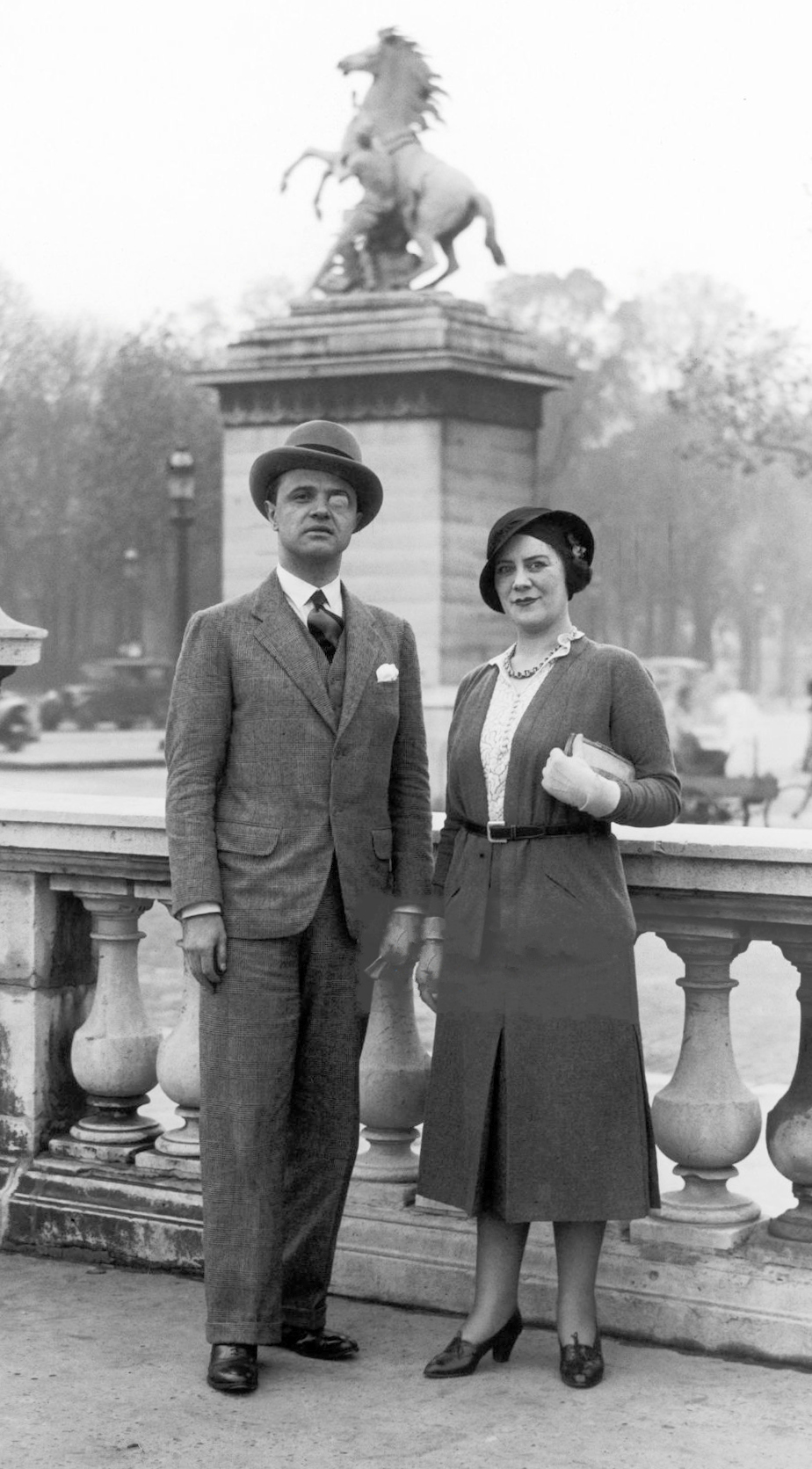
Darquier with Myrtle Jones c. 1931

On 10 December 1947 he was sentenced to death in absentia, national degradation for life and the confiscation of his property by the French High Court of Justice for collaboration. However, he had by then fled to Spain, where the Fascist regime of Francisco Franco protected him. He was one of a number of French exiles, including Abel Bonnard, Georges and Maud Guilbaud, and Alain Laubreaux.

In 1978, a French journalist from L'Express magazine interviewed him. Among other things, Darquier declared that in Auschwitz, gas chambers were not used to kill humans, but only lice, and that allegations of killings by this method were lies by the Jews. When L'Express published the interview, it caused an immediate scandal. The extradition of Darquier was requested, but was refused by Spain. The incident raised awareness of the persecution of French Jews during the Holocaust.

The English psychiatrist Anne Darquier was his daughter by his Australian wife, Myrtle Jones. She was abandoned by her parents as a child in the 1930s when she was left with a London nanny.

== See also ==
- Union générale des israélites de France

== Cited sources ==
- Fraser, Nicholas (2006) "Toujours Vichy: a reckoning with disgrace," Harper's, pp. 86–94. Review of two books, including Callil, Bad Faith.
