= Charles du Paty de Clam =

French soldier and politician

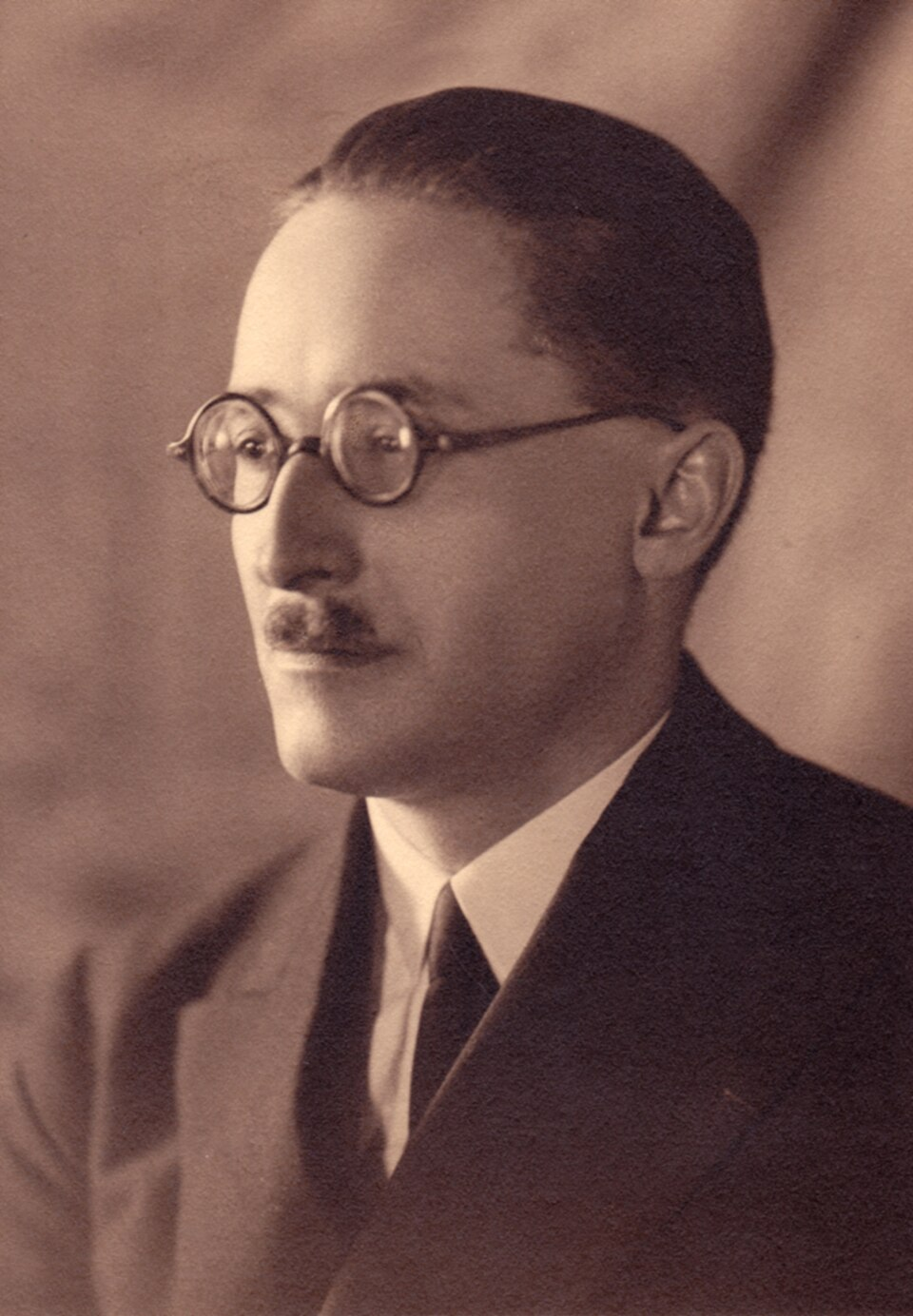
Charles Mercier du Paty de Clam

Charles Mercier du Paty de Clam (16 February 1895 – 8 April 1948) was a French soldier and civil servant who served as Commissioner-General for Jewish Affairs under the Vichy government between March and May 1944.

== Biography ==
Charles du Paty de Clam was born on 16 February 1895 in Paris, the son of Armand du Paty de Clam, key figure of the Dreyfus Affair. He graduated with a law bachelor from Sciences Po and was mobilized during World War I.

In 1920, Du Paty de Clam was appointed colonial officer in Damascus by the Ministry of Foreign Affairs, then under a French mandate. As the governor of North Lebanon, he repressed the Sunni Tripoli riots of 1936. Hesitating between De Gaulle and Pétain, he eventually chose to become Director-General of the Levant States Office for the Vichy regime in 1941.

Du Paty de Clam was appointed Commissioner-General for Jewish Affairs on 1 March 1944, mainly because he was the son of Alfred Dreyfus' accuser. Suspected of passivity and disinterest towards the aryanisation process, he was eventually replaced with Joseph Antignac on 17 May 1944.

The role of Du Paty de Clam as Commissioner-General for Jewish Affairs is the most ambiguous of those who occupied the position. As a Maurassian, he was strongly opposed to the German occupation of France and engaged in double dealing by serving the Germans while doing small favors to the resistance. A reader of La France Juive like his father (he participated in a commemoration of Édouard Drumont on 3 May 1944), his antisemitism was neither virulent nor racial. Opposed to "Jewish dominance" in the economy and Jewish immigration from Central Europe, he dismissed at the same time the so-called "Jewish plot" and those who believed in it. According to the historian Laurent Joly, his hindrances to the organization's agenda were mostly symbolic. While Du Paty de Clam, Joly follows, does not deserve a historical rehabilitation because of his ambivalence, he was nonetheless sincerely interested in the plight of French Jews and was scandalized by the criminal operations of aryanisation.

Initially convicted of sharing intelligence with the enemy, he was tried again on 19 June 1947 and his case eventually dismissed by a High Court of Justice for his resistance acts. It also considered that he had rendered his service as Commissioner-General in an "ineffective" manner. Du Paty de Clam fell ill while in prison, and he died a few months after his release on 8 April 1948.
