= Passerelle François Coty =

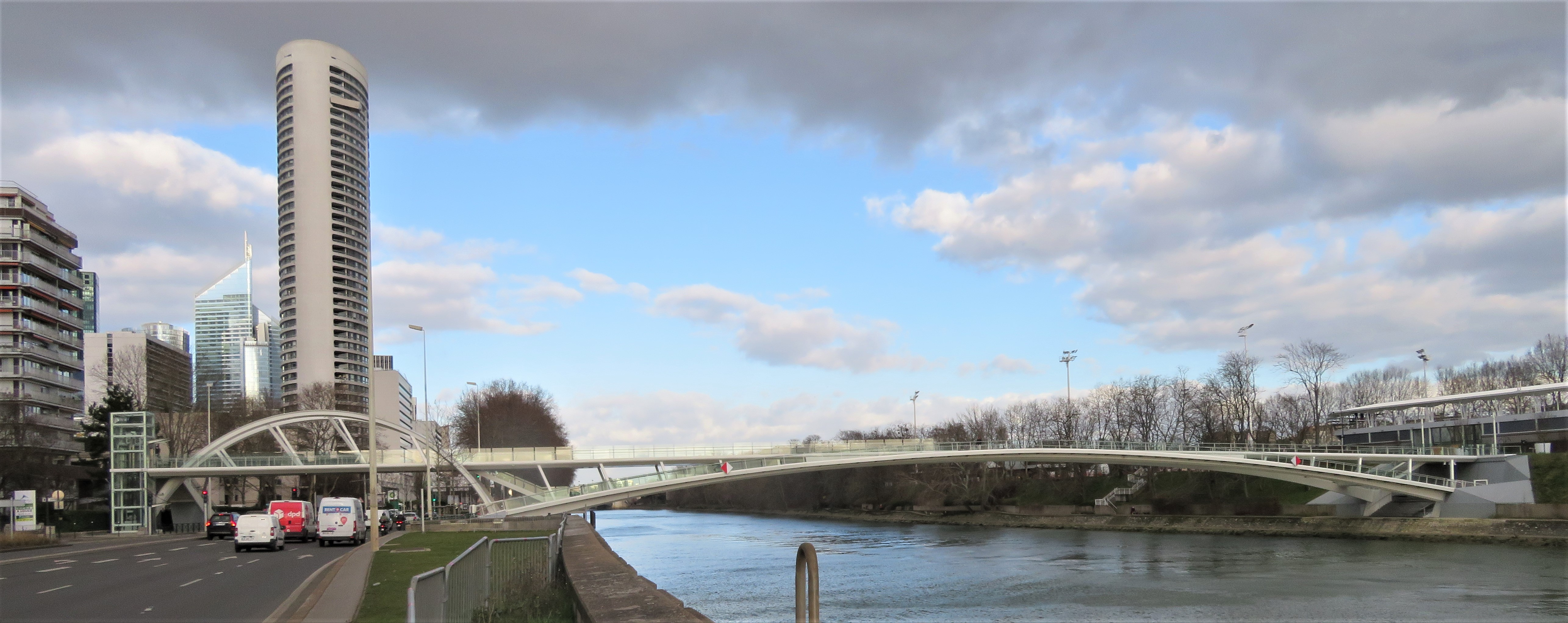
- View of the Quai De Dion Bouton downstream.
- Crosses: Seine
- Locale: Neuilly-sur-Seine and Puteaux, France
- Next upstream: Pont de Neuilly
- Next downstream: Pont de Puteaux

Characteristics
- Total length: 145 metres (476 ft)
- Width: 9 metres (30 ft)

The Passerelle François Coty is a footbridge that connects the Quai De Dion Bouton to the Île de Puteaux by crossing the D7 road and the main branch of the Seine. It is located between the Pont de Puteaux and the Pont de Neuilly. It opened in September 2019.

== General features ==
This footbridge consists of two spans. The first, 34 metres long, crosses the D7 road and weighs 110 tonnes. The second, 105 metres long, allows you to cross the Seine and weighs 360 tonnes.

== History ==
=== Key stakeholders ===
==== Contracting authority ====
The project owner is the city of Puteaux, assisted by Citallios and Oger International.

==== Design and manufacturing ====
The design was entrusted to the architectural firm Architecture Environnement Infrastructure, surrounded by COREDIA (design office), Paysage et territoires, Progexial and Alliance Économie 75.

The metal fabrication is carried out by the Viry company.

The structural work is carried out by the Chantiers Modernes.

== Technical specifications ==
- 510 tons of steel for the steel framework. Most of the steels used are of S355 and S460 grades.
- 2,000 m3 of terracotta land.
- 350 m2 of wooden decking laid on the structure.
- 800 linear metres of glazed railings and a stainless steel handrail.

== Access ==
From the Quai De-Dion-Bouton:

- on the Puteaux side, access is either by stairs or by lift.
- on the Seine side, by two staircases.

On the Île de Puteaux:

- on the upper level at the Allée Georges Hassoux giving access to the sports facilities located on the island.
- on the lower level, the footpath bordering the Seine.

The footbridge is accessible from 6 a.m. to 11 p.m.

== Controversy over the name ==
The footbridge was named in homage to François Coty, a right-wing industrialist and politician with a controversial personality, which caused incomprehension amongst Christophe Grébert a journalist, and Laurent Joly.

== Related articles ==
List of crossings of the Seine
