= Jacques Helbronner =

French jurist, civil servant and Jewish official (1873-1943)

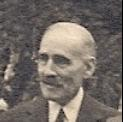
- Born: Jacques, Edouard Helbronner; 21 September 1873; Paris, France
- Died: 23 November 1943 (aged 70); Auschwitz-Birkenau, German-occupied Poland
- Cause of death: gas chamber
- Occupation(s): Jurist, civil servant
- Parent(s): Horace Helbronner; Hermance Saint-Paul

Jacques Helbronner (1873-1943) was a French jurist, civil servant and Jewish official. He served as the president of the Israelite Central Consistory of France from 1940 to 1943. He was deported to the Auschwitz concentration camp, where he was murdered in a gas chamber by the Nazis.

== Early life ==
Jacques Helbronner was born on 21 September 1873 in Paris, France. His father, Horace Helbronner, was a lawyer. His mother, Hermance Saint-Paul, was a housewife.

Helbronner graduated from Sciences Po. He received a Doctorate in Law. He did his military service from 1894 to 1895.

== Career ==
Helbronner was a lawyer at the Court of Appeal of Paris from 1895 to 1898. He subsequently worked as a civil servant for the Conseil d'État. He became a Commander of the Legion of Honour in 1925.

Helbronner served as the president of the Israelite Central Consistory of France from 1940 to 1943. He was a supporter of Marshal Philippe Pétain, who told him he had been pressured by the German invaders into passing antisemitic laws. Similarly, Xavier Vallat told Helbronner he would change those laws and spare 95 percent of French Jews. Historian Jacques Adler has argued Helbronner was misled by the Vichy government. Meanwhile, in 1941, Helbronner accepted a leadership position in the Union générale des israélites de France (UGIF, General Organization of Jews in France), even though he was initially opposed to its establishment.

== Death ==
Helbronner was deported to the Auschwitz concentration camp in 1943, where he was murdered in a gas chamber by the Nazis.

== See also ==
- Union générale des israélites de France
