= André Tulard =

French civil administrator and police inspector

André Tulard (23 June 1898 – 3 February 1967) was a French civil administrator and police inspector. He is known for having created the fichier juif, a census of Jews in Vichy France. Tulard was head of the Service of Foreigners and Jewish Affairs at the Prefecture of Police of Paris.

Although Tulard was an active collaborator with the Germans, he received no punishment after the war and even retained his title as Knight of the Legion of Honor.

== The fichier juif ==
Tulard created the first census of members of the French Communist Party (PCF), for the Prefecture of Police under the Third Republic (1871–1940). He created another census under Vichy, which listed Jews, known as the fichier juif. These files were then handed over to Theodor Dannecker, head of the Gestapo in Paris.

Following a Nazi ordinance dated 21 September 1940, which forced Jews in occupied France to declare themselves as such at a police station or sub-prefecture, Vichy promulgated the first law on the status of Jews on 3 October 1940. In the department of the Seine alone, encompassing Paris and its immediate suburbs, nearly 150,000 persons presented themselves to the police station. The registrations were then centralized by the French police, who created, under the direction of inspector Tulard, a central filing system. According to the Dannecker report, "the dossier is subdivided into files ordered alphabetically, with Jews of French or foreign nationality being on cards of different colours, as well as files ordered by profession, by nationality, and by street". (Note: French: « ce fichier se subdivise en fichier simplement alphabétique, les Juifs de nationalité française et étrangère ayant respectivement des fiches de couleur différentes, et des fichiers professionnels par nationalité et par rue. »). These files were then handed over to section IV J of the Gestapo, in charge of the "Jewish problem". They were then used by the Gestapo on various raids, among them the August 1941 raid in the 11th arrondissement of Paris, during which 3,200 foreign Jews and 1,000 French Jews were interned in various camps, including Drancy.

Along with many French police officers, André Tulard was present on the day of the inauguration of Drancy internment camp, which would be the last stop before Auschwitz for Jewish people rounded up in France, in the huge majority by the French police itself. Tulard also participated in the logistics concerning the distribution of yellow badges, made mandatory by the Vichy law on the status on Jews.

After the collapse of Vichy France and the end of the war, Tulard was one of the active collaborators with the Germans who received no punishment, and even retained his title as a Knight of the Legion of Honor.

André Tulard was a diligent civil servant educated in the law. Cooperating with German officials, he oversaw the development of a registry for Jews at the Paris municipal police headquarters in fall 1940. More than 110 people, mostly women, created the cards—blue for French-born Jews and orange for the more vulnerable foreign-born Jews—and pulled the cards identifying Jews to be rounded up for deportation "to the East".

At the end of the war, French authorities suspended Tulard, but he was reinstated, perhaps helped by a petition stating that he was "never antisemitic".

== See also ==
- Drancy internment camp
- Theodor Dannecker
- IBM during World War II

== Sources ==
- Maurice Rajsfus, La Police de Vichy — Les forces de l'ordre françaises au service de la Gestapo, 1940/1944, Le Cherche Midi éditeurs, 1995 (in French) (Rajsfus is a French historian, specialist of the history of the police. He was called for during the trial of Maurice Papon).
- Sonia Combe, Les fichiers de juifs. De la dissimulation à la désinformation in la revue Lignes, n°23, octobre 1994, pp. 93–127.
