= Joseph Antignac =

French Nazi collaborator

- Born: 29 July 1895; Bordeaux, France
- Died: 16 July 1976 (aged 79); Paris, France

Joseph Antignac (29 July 1895 – 16 July 1976) was a French official and businessman who served as secretary-general (de facto head) of the Commissariat-General for Jewish Affairs (French: Commissariat général aux questions juives, CGQJ) from 17 May to 17 August 1944 under the Vichy regime. Earlier, he had been regional director of the Police for Jewish Affairs (PQJ), director of the Investigation and Control Section (SEC) for the southern zone, and chief of staff at the CGQJ.

== Early life and career ==
Antignac was born in Bordeaux, France, on 29 July 1895. A career soldier during and after the First World War, he later entered business; by 1935 he was director of a wood-veneer and insulation firm in Belgium. Mobilised on 3 September 1939, he fought until being demobilised in October 1940 and then took refuge in Périgueux.

== Vichy France ==
In October 1941 Antignac was appointed director of the Police for Jewish Affairs for the Limoges region. In August 1942 he became director of the SEC for the zone libre; from November 1942 he served as chief (then director) of cabinet at the CGQJ, positions he retained until 1 April 1944. In April and May 1943, as cabinet director, he sent three reports to Heinz Röthke (SD, Jewish Section) denouncing the concealment of foreign Jewish children linked to associates of Juliette Stern within the UGIF. In April 1944 he briefly served as director-general of economic aryanisation.

By decree of 17 May 1944 (Journal officiel, 27 May) Antignac was placed at the head of the CGQJ with the title of secretary-general, a post he held until mid-August 1944. As Paris was being liberated, Antignac and a collaborator (Besson) ordered the gathering and burning of files—particularly SEC dossiers—in the CGQJ courtyard between 17 and 21 August 1944; other documents were piled in the cellars.

== Arrest, trial and sentence ==
Antignac went into hiding in Paris on 18 August 1944 and was arrested on 20 November 1944, then interned at Nanterre. He sought release in the spring of 1945 and was hospitalised at Hôpital Cochin in December 1947. He was tried before the Court of Justice of the Seine and sentenced to death on 9 July 1949; following dismissal of his appeal on 17 August 1949, his sentence was commuted to life at hard labour by presidential decree on 11 January 1950. He received amnesty in 1954.

== Death ==
Antignac died on 16 July 1976 at Cochin Hospital in the 14th arrondissement of Paris.
