= Police collaboration in Vichy France =

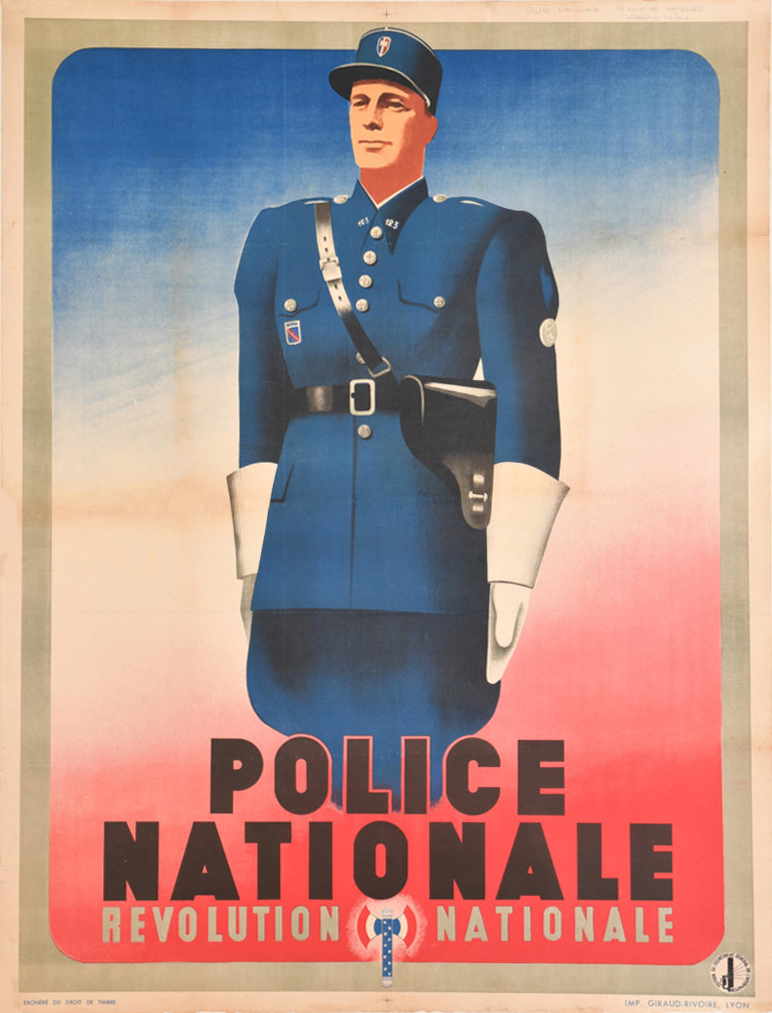
"National Police National Revolution". Propaganda poster for the recruitment of the National Police as part of the Vichy regime's National Revolution, late 1941 - early 1942

Police collaboration in Vichy France was part of the Vichy government's external political objectives and emerged as an essential tool of collaboration in meeting its policy of collaboration with Nazi Germany during World War II.

== Oath of state ==
On 14 August 1941, a decree signed by Philippe Pétain required all civil servants to take an oath of loyalty to him. An official ceremony took place for the police on 20 January 1942, during which 3,000 delegates from the Paris Guard, the National Police and the Police Prefecture met in the great hall of the Palais de Chaillot, under the presidency of Pierre Pucheu, Minister of the Interior. After the Peacekeepers' Band played La Marseillaise, the oath was taken in these terms: "I swear loyalty to the Head of State in everything he commands in the interest of the service, public order and the good of the country". To which all the police officers present responded by raising their arms and saying: "I swear it".

== Round-ups ==
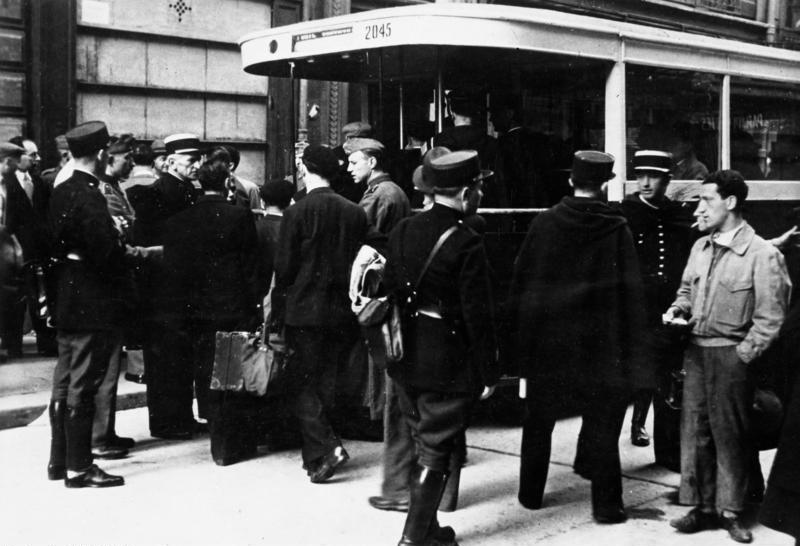
Foreign Jews in Paris arrested by French police are put into busses, August 1941

French police carried out numerous round-ups (French: rafles) of Jews during World War II, including the Green ticket roundup in May 1941, the round-up in the 11th arrondissement of Paris in August 1941 in which 4,200 persons were arrested and interned at Drancy, the massive Vélodrome d'Hiver round-up in 1942 in which over 13,000 Jews were arrested, the rafle of Clermont-Ferrand (25 November 1943), and the roundup in the Old Port of Marseille in 1943. Almost all of those arrested were deported to Auschwitz or other death camps.

== See also ==
- Carlingue
- Collaboration with the Axis powers
- Government of Vichy France
- Green ticket roundup
- Groupe mobile de réserve
- Law on the status of Jews
- Joseph Darnand
- Milice
- René Bousquet
- Special Brigades
- Vel' d'Hiv Roundup
- Vichy anti-Jewish legislation
- Vichy Holocaust collaboration timeline
- Wartime collaboration
- Paris in World War II
