= Union générale des israélites de France =

Organization created by the Vichy regime

The offices of the Union Générale des Israélites de France in 1942

The General Union of French Israelites (French: Union générale des israélites de France, UGIF) was a body created by the antisemitic French politician Xavier Vallat under the Vichy regime after the Fall of France in World War II. UGIF was created by decree on 29 November 1941 following a German request, for the express purpose of enabling the discovery and classification of Jews in France and isolating them both morally and materially from the rest of the French population. It operated in two zones: the northern zone, chaired by André Baur, and the southern zone, under the chairmanship of Raymond-Raoul Lambert.

The mission of the UGIF was to represent Jews before the public authorities, particularly in matters of assistance, welfare and social reintegration. All other Jewish associations in France were dissolved and their assets donated to the UGIF and all Jews living in France were required to join the UGIF. The administrators of this body mostly belonged to the French-Jewish bourgeoisie, and were appointed by the Commissariat-General for Jewish Affairs (CGQJ), the structure which had been initiated by the Vichy government at the instigation of the Nazis to reinforce antisemitic persecution. In order to finance its activities, the UGIF drew on a solidarity fund whose income was generated using the proceeds from the confiscation of Jewish property, as well as contributions from its members and from funds allocated from the CGQJ.

The role of the organisation is controversial, particularly due to its legalism, which had transformed the offices of the association of children's homes, which it sponsored, into traps particularly vulnerable to Gestapo raids. Composed essentially of conservative elements of the assimilated Jewish bourgeoisie, it has been accused by authors from left-wing Jewish groups of being a forum for collaboration with the Vichy regime, both ideologically and administratively. Its action was based on the reasoning that the Jewish question in France was a problem of immigration of refugees from Eastern and Central Europe, and that French Jews, who were assimilated to the French bourgeoisie, could benefit from a certain ambiguity on the part of the Vichy regime. However, from 1943 and the acceleration of the Final Solution in Europe, this fiction collapsed and the collaborationist policy of the UGIF leaders led directly to their deportation to Auschwitz. After the war, a jury of honour was established, in relative secrecy, without really deciding whether or not the UGIF was collaborationist. The late publication of the notebooks of one of the leaders of the UGIF, by an Israeli historian, makes it possible to understand, according to Claude Levy, resistance fighter Raymond Lévy's brother, that one of the sources of the collaboration of the UGIF and its leading members came from their personal attachment to Marshal Pétain and their confidence in Xavier Vallat.

== Background ==
=== Demographics ===
In 1940 there were about 300,000–330,000 Jews living in metropolitan France (0.7% of the population), among them 150,000 French citizens and 150,000 immigrants. Two-thirds of them lived in the provinces, but the overwhelming majority of foreign Jews lived within the Paris region. Of the 150,000 French Jews, 90,000 were of old stock and of the 60,000 foreign Jews, they were often immigrants from Eastern Europe of whom half had been naturalized in the 1930s.

At the beginning of World War II, French Jews formed a wealthy and cultured milieu. They belonged overwhelmingly to the bourgeoisie, often even to the French high bourgeoisie which made them conservative of the social order. They were established in all the cities and were completely assimilated into French culture, whereas foreign Jews lived mainly in Paris, were refugees from Eastern Europe who were mostly at the bottom of the social ladder, who often came from or were involved in revolutionary movements, and generally remained attached to Yiddishkeit, the symbol of fidelity to ancestral customs.

=== Nomenclature ===
Since 1808 and the creation of the Israelite Central Consistory of France, French people of Jewish origin have never been referred to as "Jews", an expression that designates a race or a nation, but as "Israelites", i.e. as citizens practising one of the four official religions and belonging entirely to the French Nation. Jews who were agnostic, even anti-religious, did not recognize themselves in this official institution that was created to administer and maintain their worship, based on the centralized model of the Catholic Church in France, by strictly reducing Judaism to a religious denomination.

=== Jewish aid organisations ===
==== Immigrants and refugees ====
French Jews created philanthropic aid organisations for refugees, such as the Jewish Welfare Committee of Paris (Comité de bienfaisance israélite de Paris [CBIP]) founded in 1809 and the Refugee Aid Committee (CAR) in 1938. The Eclaireuses et Eclaireurs israélites de France (EIF, Jewish Guides and Scouts of France), was founded in 1923 by Robert Gamzon, grandson of the Chief Rabbi of France Alfred Lévy, and had been involved since 1930 in the integration of Jewish immigrants from Germany and Eastern Europe. From the perspective of the refugees, the French were, at best, bad Jews, and at worst, traitors to their religion and their people. The Jewish immigrants from Eastern Europe organised themselves, especially in Paris, by origin and political tendency.

==== Landsmanschaften ====
The landsmanschaften, organisations of Jewish immigrants by country or region of origin, organised into a federation, the Federation of Jewish Societies of France (FSJF, Fédération des sociétés juives de France) that was founded in Paris in 1913. From the 1930s it was known as the main representative of Jews immigrating to France. As well as providing sustenance and legal aid, it offered access to social and cultural activities. Its president, Marc Jarblum, was a leader of the Zionist movement. The political parties in which immigrant Jews were involved were the Bund, which allied with the French Section of the Workers' International and which encouraged the Yiddish language and the Main-d'œuvre immigrée (MOI) trade union. It integrated into Communist International and various socialist-Zionist parties.

==== Children ====
The Œuvre de secours aux enfants (OSE, Children's Relief Society) was founded in 1912 in Tsarist St Petersburg by Jewish physicians to help underprivileged Jewish populations. In 1922, the OSE created an international network of groups that had its headquarters in Berlin, under the name Union-OSE, with Albert Einstein its first president. The OSE moved its headquarters to Paris in 1933 as a result of Nazi persecution within Germany. It opened houses in the Paris region to take in Jewish children fleeing from Germany and Austria, then very soon afterwards to take in children living in France. The Jewish association Colonie Scolaire at 36 rue Amelot in Paris is known for the June 1940 meeting of Jewish immigrant organisations which formed the Amelot Street Committee (Comité de la rue Amelot), an underground organisation that provided aid to refugees, internees and children.

==== National coordination and distribution ====
The American Jewish Joint Distribution Committee (JDC or Joint) distributed grants to local philanthropic institutions. In June 1940, the JDC established its offices in Marseilles. In 1941, the JDC distributed nearly US$800,000, or about 65 million francs, which then represented more than 70% of the aid distributed as social assistance. In the summer of 1940, the JDC director decided to distribute the bulk of French aid through the CAR rather than the FSJF, which did not improve relations between the leaders of the two organisations. Following the internment of a large number of foreign Jews to camps, Christian and Jewish charities developed a network of aid to these camps. In October 1940, the Nîmes Committee was established to coordinate Jewish and Christian relief efforts to the interned, under the chairmanship of American Donald Lowry. The CAR settled in Marseille in August 1940. At the end of 1940, the communists of the MOI created a self-help organisation, Solidarity (Solidarité), which aimed to help the needy, especially the wives of prisoners, and later the wives and families of internees. Solidarity was better organised than the Amelot Street Committee, whose activities were similar, but was a clandestine organisation due to communism and communists being outlawed.

=== The Coordinating Committee ===
After the occupation of Paris in June 1940 and installation of the Vichy France government, the Consistory withdrew to Lyon, leaving the Association consistoriale des israélites de Paris (ACIP) to provide aid in Paris. In August 1940, the ACIP was approached by Theodor Dannecker, a Sicherheitsdienst officer who was the representative of the Gestapo Office of Jewish Affairs in France, who declared himself the official representative for French Jewry. Dannecker demanded that Jewish Consistoire be converted into a Judenrat, essentially a Jewish administrative body that was controlled by the Nazis. As the Consistory's administration was limited to worship alone, the ACIP had initially recused themselves but under German pressure agreed to establish a coordination committee. The Coordinating Committee of Charities of Greater Paris (Comité de Coordination des Oeuvres de Bienfaisance du Grand Paris) was established on 30 January 1941 in the northern zone, incorporating the ACIP's benevolent committee, representatives of the Amelot Street Committee, and the OSE. Most other French and immigrant Jewish relief committees affiliated with it to avoid dissolution.

In the months following its creation, the Committee remained under the predominant leadership of the men of the ACIP, but in March, Dannecker imposed Israël Israelowicz and Wilhelm Biberstein, who had come from Vienna to be his proxies. André Baur, nephew of Chief Rabbi Julien Weill, became Secretary General of the committee. From July 1941, strong tensions appeared between the committee and the immigrant populations: on 20 July, in order to confront a demonstration by 500 women internees, Léo Israélowicz asked Dannecker for protection. The Committee succeeded in obtaining the release of a certain number of internees, but the immigrants became increasingly distant from the committee. On 18 August 1941, Dannecker demanded 6,000 Jews for "agricultural work" in the Ardennes. The Committee then asked for volunteers exclusively from among the immigrants. The volunteers were few in number and as a retaliatory measure, the Germans organised a round-up of 3,200 foreign Jews and 1,000 French Jews who were interned in Drancy internment camp. At the end of August, the ACIP officially joined the committee.

=== The Office of the Commissioner General for Jewish Affairs ===
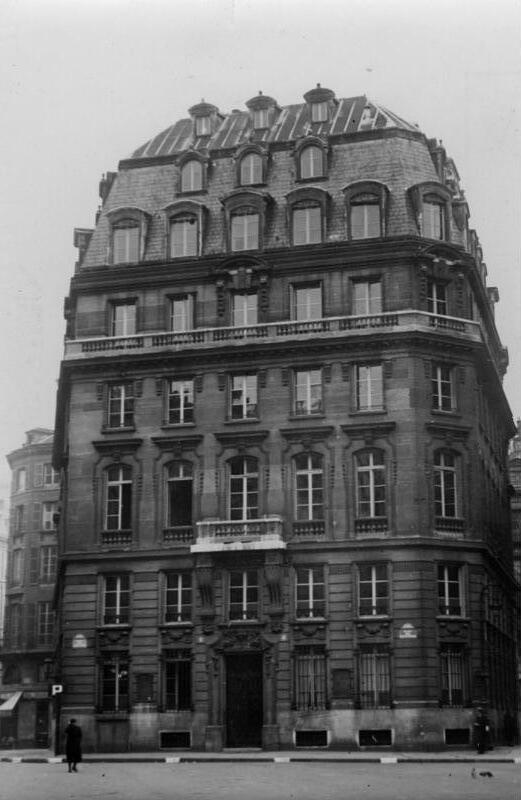
The headquarters of the CGQJ., located in the former Léopold Louis-Dreyfus bank

At the request of German authorities, the Commissariat-General for Jewish Affairs (CGQJ, Commissariat général aux questions juives) was created by the Vichy French Council of Ministers. The enforcement decree implementing the law dates from 29 March 1941. The CGQJ was initially under the authority of Secretary of State for the Interior Pierre Pucheu and then, from 6 May 1942, directly under that of the head of government, at that time Pierre Laval. According to the Dannecker report of 1 July 1941, the CGQJ was created at the "repeated insistence" of the Jewish service of the embassy. Dannecker was suspicious of the first commissioner, the antisemitic Xavier Vallat, a former deputy of right-wing monarchist Action Française party.

The Police for Jewish Affairs (PQJ) was officially created by a government decree by Pucheu in October 1941 (together with the Anti-Communist Police Service [SPAC] and the Secret Society Police Service [SSS] that was intended to operate against freemasonry). Before the creation of the PQJ, there was a small group of police officers in Paris under the leadership of Commissioner François and Judenreferat Dannecker. In the whole of the southern zone, the PQJ had only about thirty employees, who were not well accepted by the Vichy administration. In the occupied zone, the PQJ never respected its legal limits: it could play the auxiliaries of the German police by harassing the Jews, but each time there was a round-up, the national police was called in and not the PQJ.

The Second law on the status of Jews of 2 June 1941 further restricted the professional practice of Jews and had been adopted on the initiative of the CGQJ. The law of 22 July 1941 enabled the CGQJ to control the Aryanisation of Jewish companies, which was in fact its essential work. Aryanisation had been implemented by German ordinances since the beginning of the occupation.

The Institute for the Study of Jewish Questions (IEQJ, Institut d'étude des questions juives) was responsible for promoting anti-Jewish propaganda and was established by Dannecker. The German Propagandastaffel service, which controlled all French press and publishers was placed under the direction of the antisemitic propagandist Captain Paul Sézille, who had no direct link with the CGQJ or any other Vichy administration.

== Formation ==
UGIF identity papers of Renée Levy. This image constitutes the first page of eight.

In the bureaucratic chain of persecution of Jews in 1941, the Coordinating Committee did not yet represent the indispensable link in the imposed, controlled organisation of the Jews. In Germany, the Reichsvereinigung (Reich Association of Jews in Germany) grouped together Jews from all over the country. In Poland, a Judenrat was established in each locality by September 1940. In the countries of Western Europe, the centralised model of the Reichsvereinigung was applied. This had already been accomplished in the Netherlands with the February 1941 establishment of the Jewish Council of Amsterdam.

Dannecker proceeded from established German ordinance, to create such a body in the occupied zone, but the military administrator (MBF. Militärbefehlshaber) instead preferred to collaborate with the Vichy regime by submitting a proposal to Xavier Vallat. He initially refused, but the French government conceded and created the Union Générale des Israélites de France (General Union of French Jews, UGIF) on 29 November 1941. The law of 1941, like all the legislative measures taken by Vichy against the Jews since the first antisemitic statute of October 1940, marks a break with republican and secular traditions. According to Article 1 of the Law of 29 November, the purpose of the UGIF

is to ensure the representation of Jews before the public authorities, particularly in matters of assistance, welfare and social reintegration

in both the northern and southern zones, which the Germans had never requested, whereas Article 2 stipulated that all Jews domiciled or resident in France must be affiliated to it.

In order to establish the compulsory organisation, Vallat consulted Jewish leaders from both zones such as Jacques Helbronner, president of the Consistoire, and Raymond-Raoul Lambert, director of the Refugee Aid Committee (CAR, Comité d'aide aux réfugiés). The leadership of the UGIF would only include French citizens. The project was the subject of lively debates between Vallat and his various interlocutors, but also among the Jews themselves. Some were resolutely hostile to the project, often because French Israelites would be treated in the same way as foreigners and those who had recently become naturalised. In 1941, Helbronner accepted a leadership position in the UGIF, though he was initially opposed to its establishment.

UGIF absorbed social welfare organisations and their staff. The attachment to the survival of the works and the conviction that their proper functioning was in the supreme interest of the community characterised the reactions of the UGIF leadership and distinguished them from the leadership of the consistory. Lambert identifies more than anyone else with the UGIF of the southern zone and had good relations with Vallat. On the immigrants' side, Marc Jarblum, president of the FSJF, was categorically opposed to the UGIF, but some OSE leaders did not see any incompatibility between the honour of the Jews and compromise with an imposed law.

Before establishing the UGIF, Vallat had initiated talks in Paris as he had done in the southern zone, but he completely ignored immigrant associations. The leaders of the former Committee agreed to take over the leadership of the UGIF while pointing out in a letter to Pétain that they had no mandate from their "foreign co-religionists". Appointments to the leadership of the UGIF were made on 8 January 1942 and included Albert Lévy, former president of the CAR and first president of UGIF, André Baur, vice-president, and Raymond-Raoul Lambert, general administrator. Baur was from the northern zone, while Lévy and Lambert were from the southern zone. Although the UGIF was theoretically a single body, the branches of each of the two zones operated independently. In the southern zone, Lambert was the strongman of the UGIF, so much so that Lévy was described as "Lambert's toy".

== Financial aspects ==
In December 1941, following a series of attacks on the occupying army (see, for example: reprisals after the death of Karl Hotz), the Germans unleashed a wave of arrests in Paris which targeted French Jews in particular: 743 of them were interned in Royallieu-Compiègne internment camp. Fifty-three Jewish hostages were shot at Mont-Valérien and the Nazi military commander (MBF, Militärbefehlshaber) announced the deportation of "Judeo-Bolshevik criminals" to the East. In March 1942, the first train to Auschwitz took 1,112 internees. The last reprisal measure by the Germans occurred on 17 December 1941 by means of a German ordinance that fined the Jews one billion francs. The fine was implemented through complex Vichy regulation and banking behavior, which was collaborationist in nature.

Until March 1942, the Wehrmacht had authority over all matters, including Jewish affairs in France, whereas after this date, police matters and the implementation of the Final Solution were transferred to a SS and police leader (Höhere SS und Polizeiführer) directly dependent on Reinhard Heydrich.

The French law of 16 January 1942, an instrument of Nazi repression, called upon the UGIF to pay the fine by establishing a special account in its own name at the Caisse des dépôts et consignations, the state bank. However, the UGIF had no money of its own, so the statute authorised the UGIF to borrow the money. This meant that the fine would be paid from blocked Jewish bank accounts and other Aryanised Jewish wealth. The UGIF arranged a loan, committing future income from the Aryanisation of Jewish property as collateral. The UGIF ultimately used 895 million francs, a little over 40% of the proceeds of the Aryanisations, to finance the payment of the fine. The French law on the Aryanisation of Jewish property, of 22 July 1941, had provided for the freezing of the sums collected from the sale of Jewish businesses. A part of these blocked assets was to be used to reimburse administrative expenses, with the remainder to be used to help needy Jews.

In the southern zone, the various social welfare agencies were grouped together by the UGIF to retain their autonomy and the resources they received from the United States. In November 1942, with the German occupation of the southern zone, this source was blocked and the Jewish leaders obtained an order from the French authorities authorising the UGIF to levy an annual tax of 120 francs in the northern zone and 320 francs in the southern zone on all Jews over the age of eighteen. To the sums thus obtained was added an amount of 80 million francs from blocked funds.

== History ==
=== Summer 1942 deportations ===
In Eastern Europe, the Nazis involved the Judenrat in the deportation process. In some ghettos in Poland, Jewish community leaders provided lists of people to be deported. In France, the UGIF was not asked to carry out this task. Arrests were entrusted only to the French state police.

Following various essentially organised leaks, the UGIF had been informed of the Vel' d'Hiv Roundup that took place on 16 and 17 July. However, UGIF leaders did not disseminate this information, which they could not yet identify with an Auschwitz they did not know about, but which could have suggested to them that it involved mass deportations. After the Vel' d'Hiv round-up on 28 July, Lambert obtained confirmation from the national police of the rumours circulating about imminent deportations to the southern zone. The leading members of the UGIF did not meet until 31 August, and when Lambert met Laval on 31 July, by chance, he did not take the opportunity to ask him the question. Lambert wrote in his diary that it was up to Lévy, president of the UGIF, or Helbronner to take this kind of action. On 2 August, he had the opportunity to explain his position to Helbronner, who was part of the Jewish high bourgeoisie, whereas Lambert appeared as a simple ambitious social technician. Raul Hilberg described Helbronner's words as criminal: "If Mr. Laval wants to see me, all he has to do is summon me, but tell him that from August 8 to September, I'm going on holiday and nothing in the world can make me come back."

This attitude of the UGIF and of the French Jewish elite was later condemned quite severely by historians such as Jacques Adler, who put forward the hypothesis that "the leaders of the UGIF knew that the operations would only affect immigrants and they feared reprisals against themselves and French Jews." Maurice Rajsfus accused the UGIF "of having lent its assistance to the Prefecture of Police concerning the round-ups of 16 and 17 July" without specifying whether this assistance consisted of other actions than the parcels that the UGIF was authorised to bring to the internees of Drancy from October 1942. When, on 3 August, the Camp des Milles was cordoned off by 170 mobile guards, the various Jewish and Christian social aid organisations reinforced their presence. Lambert rushed to the camp alongside Donald Lowry, the Grand Rabbi of Marseille Israël Salzer and Pastor Henri Manen of Aix. Lambert, who was not yet aware of the nature of Auschwitz and the Final Solution, wrote in his notebook:

Monday 10 August: a terrible day, a heartbreaking spectacle. Buses take 70 children away from their parents who will leave this evening... Overseen by armed guards, 40 human beings who have committed no crime because they are Jews, are delivered by my country, which had promised asylum, to those who will be their executioners.

In January 1943, the Marseille roundup provoked a protest signed by Salzer, Rabbi René Hirschler, the Chaplain General, and Lambert on behalf of the UGIF of the southern zone. The protest marked a change in the practices of the UGIF that until then had been strictly limited to the framework of social action.

=== Association with Jewish resistance ===
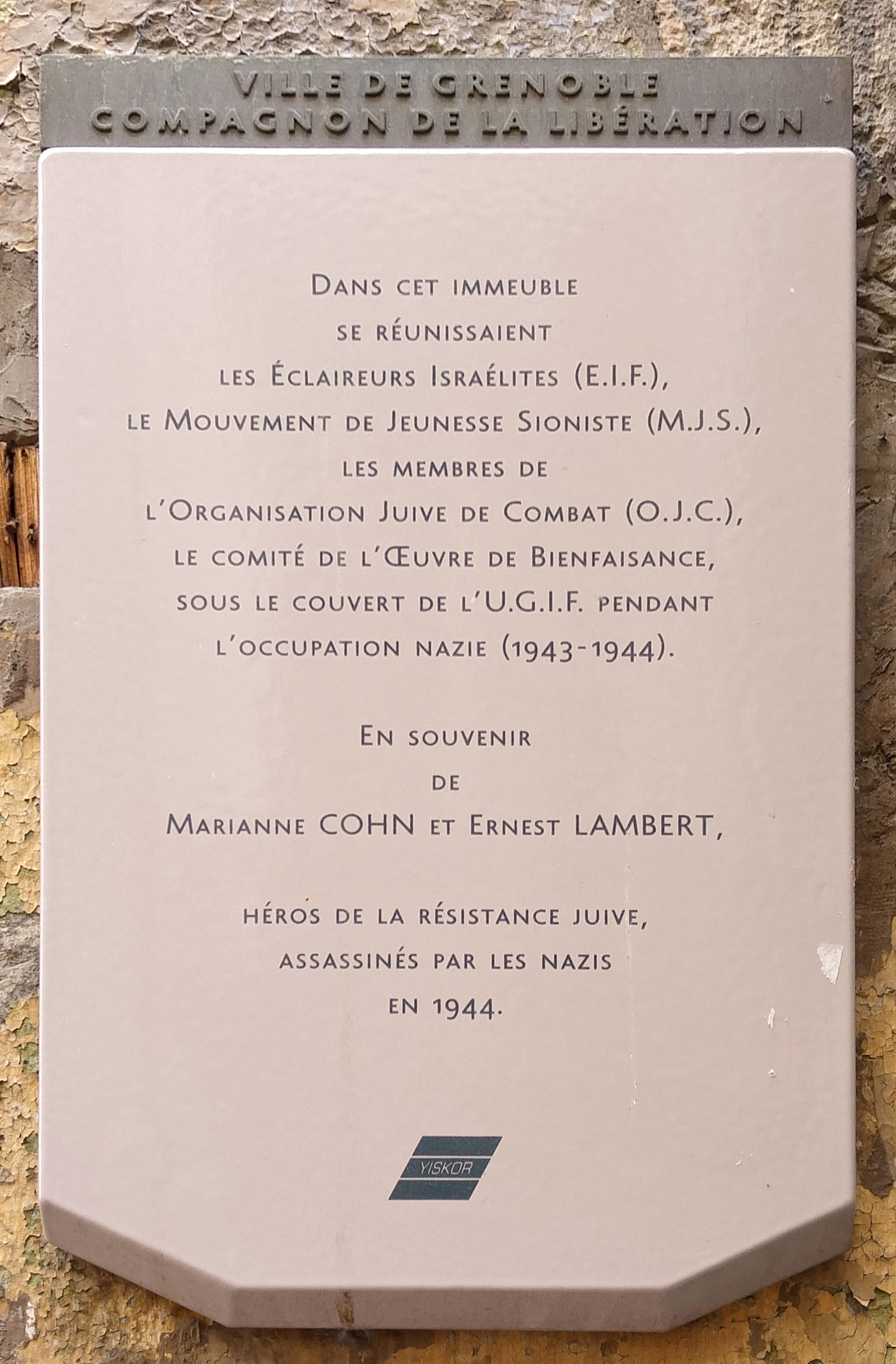
A commemorative plaque in Grenoble highlights the cover provided to the Jewish Resistance by the General Union of Israelites of France

While resistance by Jews in other German-occupied countries may have organised an armed response to oppose the policy of extermination directed against the Jewish population, the Jewish resistance in France held rescue actions to be the most important activity. Jewish résistants such as Adam Rayski felt that UGIF should have dissolved itself as he believed the organisation did far more to assist the German occupation than it ever did to assist the Jewish communities.

The absolute legalism of the UGIF forbade it from being classified as Jewish Resistance, though this did not prevent it from maintaining links with resistance groups. Following the Vel' d'Hiv round-up, many of the children who had escaped arrest stayed temporarily with neighbours or the caretaker. In its Information Bulletin, the UGIF of Paris requested that abandoned children be reported to it. Prior to the round-ups, children had already been entrusted to the UGIF, which operated six children's homes. At the end of 1942, there were a total of 386 children in the homes run by the UGIF. These became a rescue hub, while the task of hiding the children as quickly as possible under Aryan identities fell to Solidarity, the OSE and Rue Amelot. The clandestine organisations put the children in safe houses with foster families, with the exception of the category of "blocked children" whom the UGIF had been authorized to take from Drancy internment camp. These children had been registered by the Sicherheitsdienst, and were overseen by Service 5 of the UGIF, led by Juliette Stern, while Orthodox Action oversaw children of Russian origin.

The UGIF leaders felt responsible not only for the safety of children but also for their Jewish education, though it did not have the means to take in all needy children. At the beginning of 1943, out of the 1,500 children entrusted to the UGIF, 1,100 were entrusted to foster families or to non-Jewish institutions.

The crucial question of legality did not only arise in the UGIF. In 1943, the OSE, which practised illegal actions on a large scale, retained its legal cover and hesitated to proceed to a hasty dissolution of its children's homes, which risked becoming a trap. On 19 October 1943, the Marseille UGIF was informed that the Gestapo was preparing an operation at the Verdière home (in the Bouches-du-Rhône) which sheltered children entrusted to the UGIF by the Gestapo. One of the leaders was of the opinion that the children should be dispersed, but Lambert's successor (Lambert had been interned at Drancy) decided to play the legality card. On 20 October, the Gestapo took all the boarders, thirty Jewish children and fourteen adults, to Drancy then to Auschwitz.

The director of the home, Alice Salomon, decided to accompany the children being deported. From the beginning of 1943, the legalism of the UGIF was denounced by the semi-clandestine rescue organisations. In February 1943, Solidarity removed 163 children from the UGIF homes.

=== Arrests of UGIF members ===
The deportations of the summer of 1942 had shown that being an employee of UGIF offered relative protection against arrest. The same German practice was found in the Judenrat of Eastern Europe. However, in 1943, this protection became increasingly illusory.

Without any known German pressure, the CGQJ abolished the legal protection of immigrants employed by the UGIF. The virulently antisemitic Louis Darquier de Pellepoix, Vallat's successor since May 1942, and cabinet director Antignac had contacts in this regard with Baur and Lambert, respectively. In March 1943, the dismissal of foreign personnel was imposed in both zones. In Paris, Dannecker's deputy Heinz Röthke immediately arrested the dismissed employees during the night of 17–18 March. Many former employees could be warned, but 60 to 80 people were nonetheless captured. The police also arrested many former employees. In the southern zone, the various aid organizations operated nearly independently under the facade of the UGIF. In Lyon in February 1943, Klaus Barbie led local Gestapo in the Rue Sainte-Catherine Roundup, arresting 84 people at the UGIF offices including members of OSE, CAR and FSJF. These people were immediately transferred to Drancy. The pretext for the raid was that these organizations were helping immigrants to escape to Switzerland with false papers. The same kind of scenario was repeated in Marseilles, after two SS men were killed by the Resistance on 1 May. Bauer, Röthke's delegate in Marseilles, asked Lambert for a list of 200 Jewish notables. Lambert refused, but the following day Bauer carried out a raid on the Marseilles offices of the UGIF. The list of 200 Jewish notables was sent to Lambert.

In Paris, the financial situation of the UGIF was much worse than in the southern zone even after March 1943, when Baur succeeded in convincing Lambert to transfer funds. From May, Jews were able to make "donations" to the UGIF and the CGQJ decreed a tax of 120 francs per Jewish adult in the northern zone and 360 francs in the southern zone. The results of this new tax were very meagre, since the lists of Jews from the 1940 census were becoming less and less reliable, with more and more Jews living illegally.

In the southern zone, in 1944, the offices of the UGIF became traps, as they were the easiest source for the German regional commanders to collect Jews when required. Round-ups thus took place in Nice, Lyon, Marseille, Chambéry, Grenoble, Brive and Limoges.

=== Income assistance ===
Welfare represented more than half of UGIF's budget and consisted of soup kitchens and direct aid distributed to the most needy. The soup kitchens depended in part on Rue Amelot. The number of people receiving aid from UGIF grew from 2,500 to 10,000 during 1942. There is no evidence that lists of UGIF aid recipients could have been used to arrest the families.

The UGIF was also active in the camps in the northern zone. These included parcels of food, clothing, and hygiene products. Through its interventions, the UGIF obtained several hundred releases, but these efforts were no longer of any use by July 1943.

=== Arrests of UGIF leadership ===
In the first three months of 1943, despite the determination of the Nazis to continue the deportations, and the opportunity created by the invasion of the former free zone, it appeared that France was lagging behind other European countries in the implementation of the Final Solution. The slow progress of the Germans gave hope to Lambert, who rejected the suggestion made by one of his colleagues to advise the Jews of Marseille to disperse (see Marseille roundup). Hilberg wrote:

Confident in the justice and honour of France ... Lambert worked to have the Jews in police custody released until the day he was arrested

On 21 August 1943, Lambert and his family were arrested and interned in Drancy before being deported to Auschwitz. He wrote to one of his former assistants to request that the Jewish children entrusted to the UGIF refuges be dispersed.

A month before Lambert's arrest, Baur, then head of the UGIF in Paris, had already been arrested. At the end of June 1943, the new head of the Drancy camp, Alois Brunner, had asked the UGIF to use its influence to ensure that the families of the internees voluntarily joined them at Drancy. Baur had refused and asked to be received by Laval. It was the first time he had made such a request since his appointment to the UGIF. He had requested the interview of Antignac, secretary general of the CGQJ. Ten days later, he was arrested and interned in Drancy. A week later, Israélowicz, the Viennese imposed by the Sicherheitsdienst, was also arrested. Helbronner, the president of the consistory was arrested on 23 October 1943.

=== The final days of UGIF ===
In 1944, a last deportation campaign was launched before the German withdrawal. Many of the 30,000 Jews living openly in Paris benefited from the help of the UGIF, which also took care of 1,500 children entrusted to its care. Although the Germans seemed to have deprioritised round-ups of Jews in the Paris region, Brunner launched a series of operations on the Parisian UGIF children's homes in July 1944, three weeks before the liberation of Paris. 250 children were arrested and deported, while the clandestine networks were able to take care of all the other children entrusted to the UGIF, including blocked children.

The UGIF had not accepted the proposals of the clandestine organisations. Georges Edinger, Baur's successor in Paris, procrastinated and after having ordered the dispersal of the children and staff, reversed his decision and ordered everyone to return. The arrests which followed, which could have been avoided, are the biggest charge Serge Klarsfeld brought against the UGIF:

This shameful task has marked the UGIF forever, leading to the neglect of the contribution of this institution, initially designed by the Germans to facilitate the Final Solution and which, undeniably, statistically speaking, has helped the Jews much more than it failed them

== See also ==
- Antisemitism in France
- History of the Jews during World War II
- History of the Jews in France
- Occupied France
- Paris in World War II
- The Holocaust in France
- Vichy Holocaust collaboration timeline
- Zone libre
- Defence Historical Service
