= Île de Puteaux =

Island in the river Seine, Paris, France

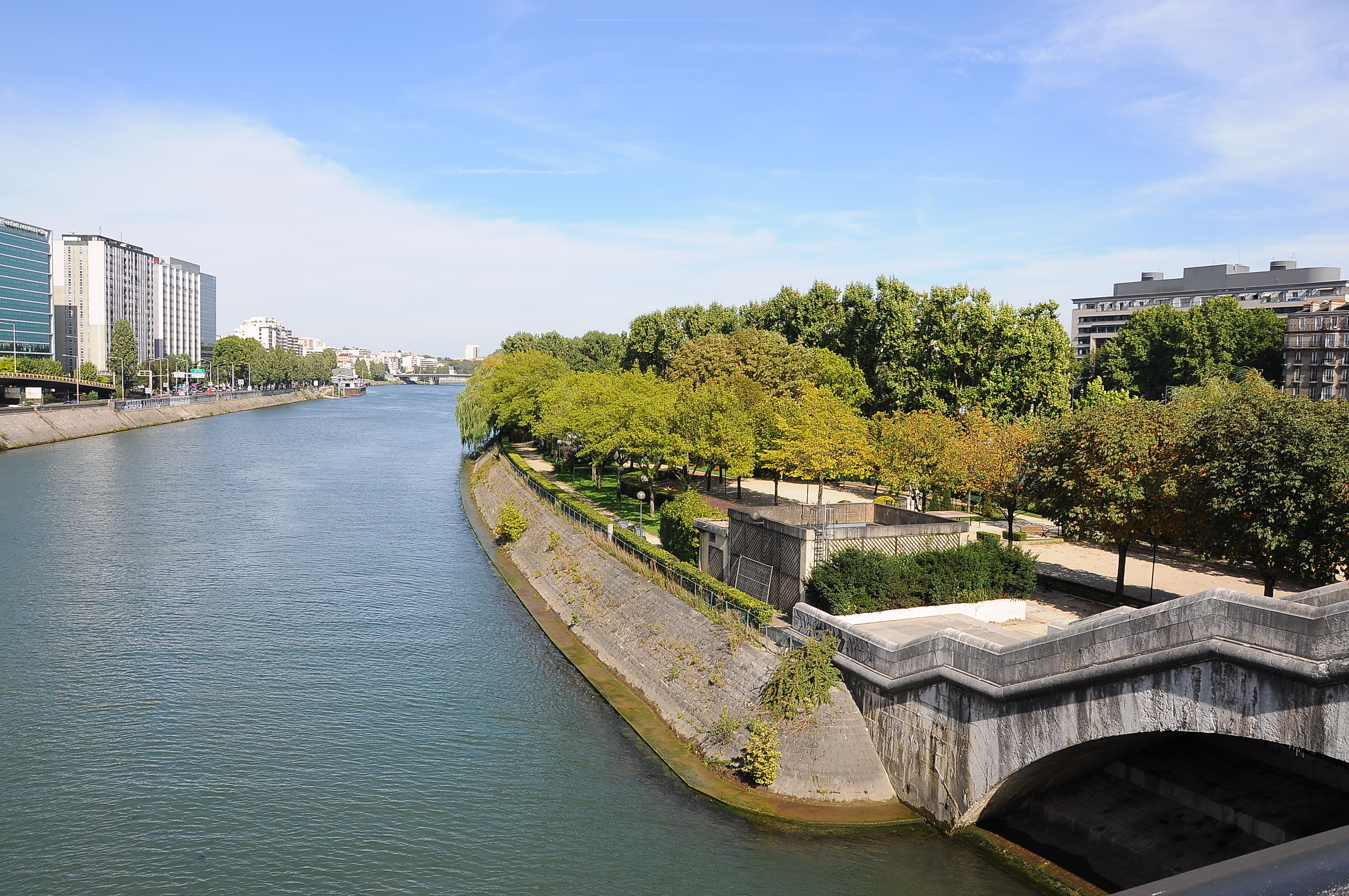
- North-east of the island of Puteaux, belonging to the municipality of Neuilly-sur-Seine.
- Interactive map of the Île de Puteaux area

General information
- Location: On the Seine in Neuilly-sur-Seine, Paris, France

The Île de Puteaux is an island on the Seine located in the Hauts-de-Seine department and whose territory belongs to the city of Puteaux. Since 1935, it has been joined to the Ile du Pont, which belongs to the city of Neuilly-sur-Seine.

== Access ==
Access to the island is:

- at the Pont de Puteaux, in the centre of the island. The current bridge (actually two bridges on each branch of the Seine) was built in the 1970s to replace the old bridge. It connects the island on one side to the city centre of Puteaux and on the other to the Porte de la Seine, on the edge of the Bois de Boulogne and in Neuilly-sur-Seine. It offers the only road access to the island.
- for pedestrians and cyclists at the Passerelle François Coty footbridge, which opened in September 2019.
- also at the Pont de Neuilly, on the l'île du Pont.

== History ==
The Ile du Pont and the Ile de Puteaux were two separate islands, joined by the filling of a branch of the Seine in 1935. The island of Puteaux belongs to Puteaux, the island of Pont to Neuilly-sur-Seine.

In 1873, Viscount Léon de Janzé founded the Société sportive de l'île de Puteaux, allowing the creation of one of the very first tennis "clubs" in France. In the Belle Époque.

The island hosted events for the 1900 Paris Olympics, including tennis competitions. It was once considered to build a stadium there, in order to host the 1938 football World Cup.

In the nineteenth century, on the Île de Puteaux, there was a model farm belonging to Salomon James de Rothschild. A part of the island was therefore called "Rothschild Island" for a time.

The island was home to a Coty perfume establishment, whose main factory was located not far from there, in Suresnes.

In 2005, the island saw the construction of a 2.60 m high fence at the boundary of the municipalities of Puteaux and Neuilly. It was carried out by the municipality of Puteaux, following a disagreement between the two municipalities.

A statue of Jean-Rodolphe Perronet, architect of the second bridge of Neuilly, stood at the northern end of the island. A first statue, the work of Adrien Gaudez, was inaugurated in July 1897 on the Inkermann roundabout. Removed by the Germans in 1942, it had been melted down. In 1981, the municipality of Neuilly acquired another stone statue of Perronet from an antique dealer and installed it on the island. In 2023, after restoration, it was moved to the square in front of the town hall, in place of the statue of Antoine Parmentier.
