= Xavier Vallat =

French Nazi collaborator

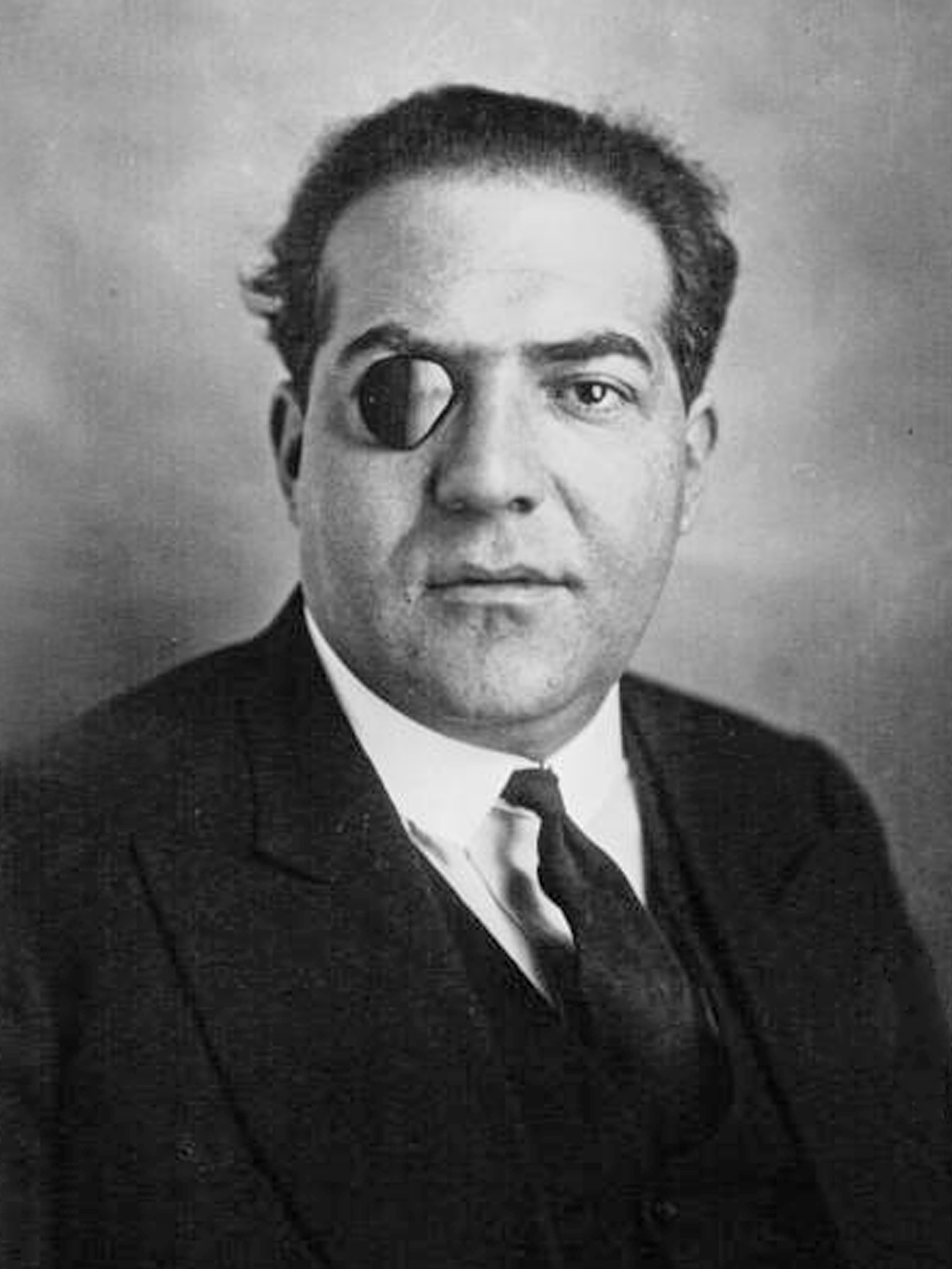
Xavier Vallat

Xavier Vallat (December 23, 1891 – January 6, 1972) was a French politician and antisemite who was Commissioner-General for Jewish Questions in the wartime collaborationist Vichy government, and was sentenced after World War II to ten years in prison for his part in the persecution of French Jews.

== Until World War II ==
Vallat was born in the department of Vaucluse into a family of conservative Catholics. In his youth he was active in Catholic organisations and joined the monarchist Action Française, the most important group on the extreme right of French politics. He became a teacher in Catholic schools before joining the French Army. In World War I he was severely wounded, losing his left leg and right eye. He was elected to the National Assembly for the Ardèche in 1919 as an "independent", who supported the National Bloc. He was defeated in 1924, re-elected in 1928 still as an "independent", and then served until the Assembly was suspended in 1940. He took membership however after the 1936 elections in the Republican Federation which was moving increasingly to the right.

In the 1930s Vallat was a leading representative of the Catholic, antisemitic extreme right in French politics. He was also anti-Protestant and anti-Masonic, arguing that Jews, Protestants and Masons were all part of a plot against Catholic France. He was violently opposed to liberalism, socialism and communism. Unlike many on the far right, however, Vallat did not favour the restoration of the monarchy, and he was notably anti-German despite his sympathy for fascism. He favoured the project for a Latin Bloc of France, Spain, Italy and Portugal.

In 1936 Léon Blum, a Jewish Socialist, became Prime Minister of France. Vallat made a series of personal rhetorical attacks on Blum, saying that "For the first time this ancient Gallo-Roman land will be governed by a Jew." Vallat was accused by the left of responsibility for the physical attack on Blum by a right-wing mob in the streets of Paris which occurred not long after this speech.

== Vichy France ==
After the German occupation of France in June 1940, Vallat supported the rise to power of Marshal Philippe Pétain at the head of a collaborationist regime based in Vichy. On 10 July 1940, he voted in favour of granting the Cabinet presided by Marshal Pétain the authority to draw up a new constitution, thereby effectively ending the French Third Republic and establishing Vichy France. In March 1941, he was appointed as head of the Commissariat-General for Jewish Questions, a body set up to implement the anti-Semitic laws enacted by Pétain's government. He later established the Union générale des israélites de France on 29 November 1941. In this position, he oversaw the "Aryanisation" of the French economy, education system, civil service and professions, and the enforcement of laws requiring all Jews to be registered with the police. As the historian Robert Paxton has demonstrated, these laws were passed by the Vichy regime on its initiative and not under German pressure, as both Pétain and Vallat claimed at their trials after the war.

The German Ambassador to Vichy, Otto Abetz, demanded that Pétain dismiss Vallat because of his corruption which happened in May 1942. This meant that it was Vallat's successor, Louis Darquier de Pellepoix, who oversaw most of French co-operation with the German deportation of more than 70,000 French Jews to the extermination camp at Auschwitz, where most of them were killed.

Vallat remained a supporter of Vichy's policies, however, and in June 1944, when the Allied armies had already landed in Normandy, he was appointed head of the Vichy Radio following the assassination of Philippe Henriot by the Resistance. He broadcast regular anti-Semitic tirades until the Allies liberated Vichy in August.

== After the war ==
At his trial before the High Court of Justice in December 1947, Vallat remained an unrepentant antisemite, demanding that one of the judges, Maurice Kriegel-Valrimont, be disqualified because he was Jewish. He denied direct responsibility for the deportations of the French Jews, claiming that his policies had saved more than half of the Jews from deportation. He claimed that Vichy's anti-Jewish laws had been enacted on German orders, but they were really done by the French themselves. Vallat was sentenced to ten years in prison. The court said he received a relatively lenient sentence in light of his service in World War I, and the many witnesses who said he had saved Jews by giving them false papers. He wanted a separate zone for the Jews, not their extermination.

Vallat was released on parole in 1949 and amnestied in 1954. He returned to anti-Semitic agitation, although he found few followers in postwar France. From 1962 to 1966 he was editor of the extreme right-wing weekly Aspects de la France.

When Vallat died in January 1972, the Nazi hunters Serge and Beate Klarsfeld protested by arriving at his funeral with a large wreath in the shape of a yellow Star of David, the symbol that French Jews had been forced to wear by the Nazis.

== See also ==
- History of far right movements in France
- Vichy France
