= Wait for Me, Daddy =

1940 photograph by Claude P. Dettloff

Coordinates: 49°12′04″N 122°54′41″W

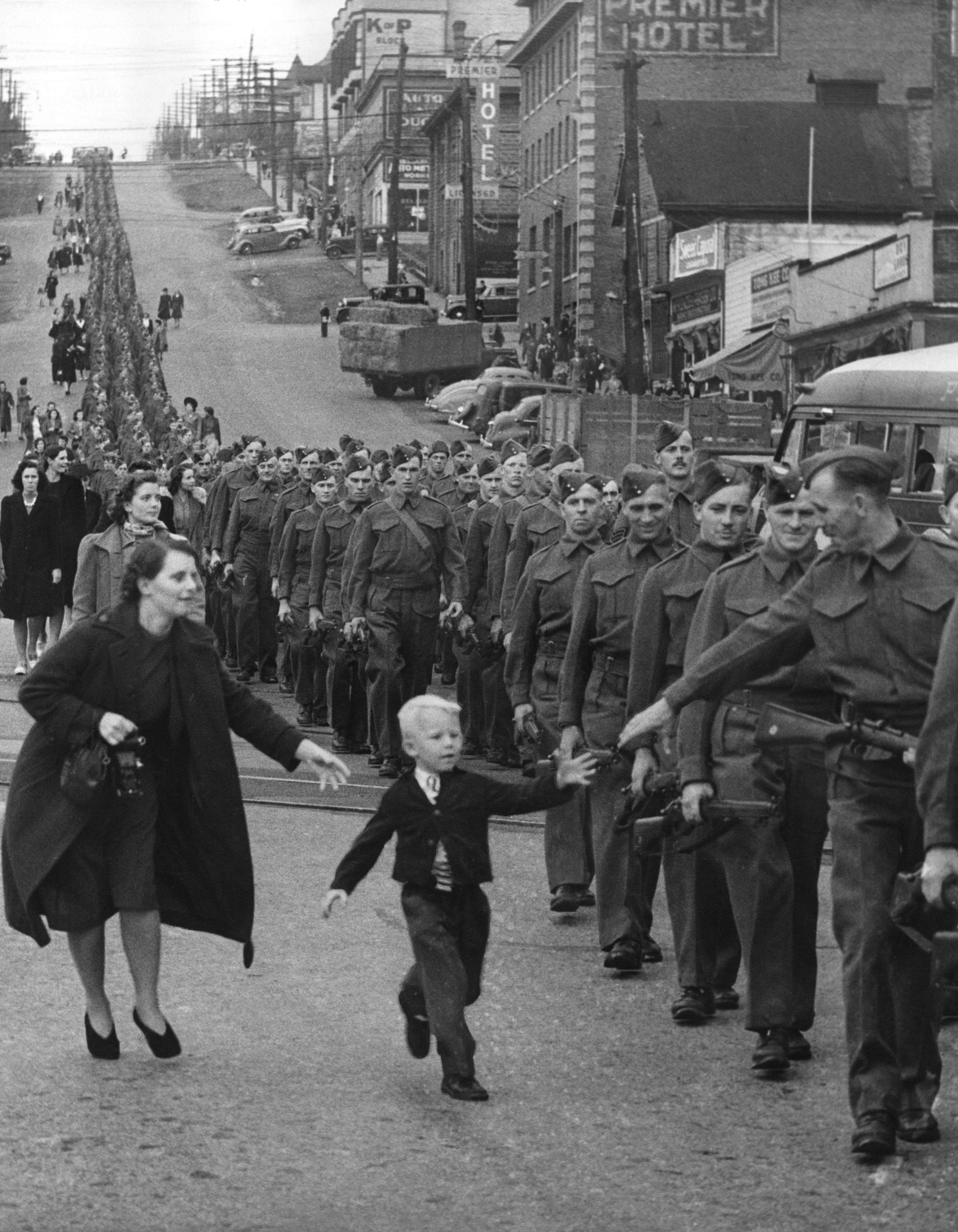
Wait for Me, Daddy, taken by Claude P. Dettloff

Wait for Me, Daddy is a photo taken by Claude P. Dettloff on October 1, 1940, of the British Columbia Regiment (Duke of Connaught's Own Rifles) marching down Eighth Street at the Columbia Street intersection, New Westminster, British Columbia. While Dettloff was taking the photo, five-year-old Warren "Whitey" Bernard broke away from his mother to his father, Private Jack Bernard. The picture received extensive exposure, with widespread circulation through magazines such as Life and Time, and was used in war-bond drives. Jack Bernard returned home safely five years later.

== Background ==
On August 26, 1939, Hitler was threatening Poland and demanding Danzig. At 4:15 that morning the regimental adjutant in British Columbia, Canada, received a call from Ottawa instructing him to call out the British Columbia Regiment. Soldiers fanned out in the city to guard vulnerable points. On September 10, 1939, Canada declared war against the German Reich, which had invaded Poland on the first of September.

While other units were sent to the United Kingdom, the British Columbia Regiment was left behind on the west coast. After months of drills and guard duty the regiment was ordered out. On October 1, 1940, they marched to New Westminster to board a waiting ship, the SS Princess Joan, to their secret destination.

== Photograph ==
Coming down Eighth Street in New Westminster, photographer Claude P. Dettloff of The Province newspaper positioned himself to photograph the whole column marching down the hill. As he was getting ready to take the picture, he saw a young boy run out onto the road. Wait for Me, Daddy captures the image of the boy, five-year-old Warren "Whitey" Bernard, running out of his mother's (Bernice) grasp to his father.

== Post image history ==
Jack returning from the Second World War October 1945

The secret destination turned out to be Nanaimo on Vancouver Island, only three hours away. Later, after years of training, the British Columbia Regiment converted from infantry to the 28th Armoured Regiment (The British Columbia Regiment), and was sent overseas. The regiment was involved in Operation Totalize and saw action in various engagements in northern Germany and the Netherlands. Their last engagement was the battle for Künsten Canal in April 1945, that saw the regiment receive a battle honour. A total of 122 soldiers died during the war, and 213 others were wounded in the regiment.

When Jack Bernard returned home now a sergeant, Dettloff was on hand to photograph the family's reunion. Jack and Bernice Bernard eventually divorced, with Jack becoming a finish carpenter in his later years. Jack died in 1981 at the age of 74. Whitey married in 1964 after he relocated to Tofino. Prior to entering local politics, he owned a marina, then served as an alderman before becoming mayor for several years then a councilman. He had one child, Steven Bernard.

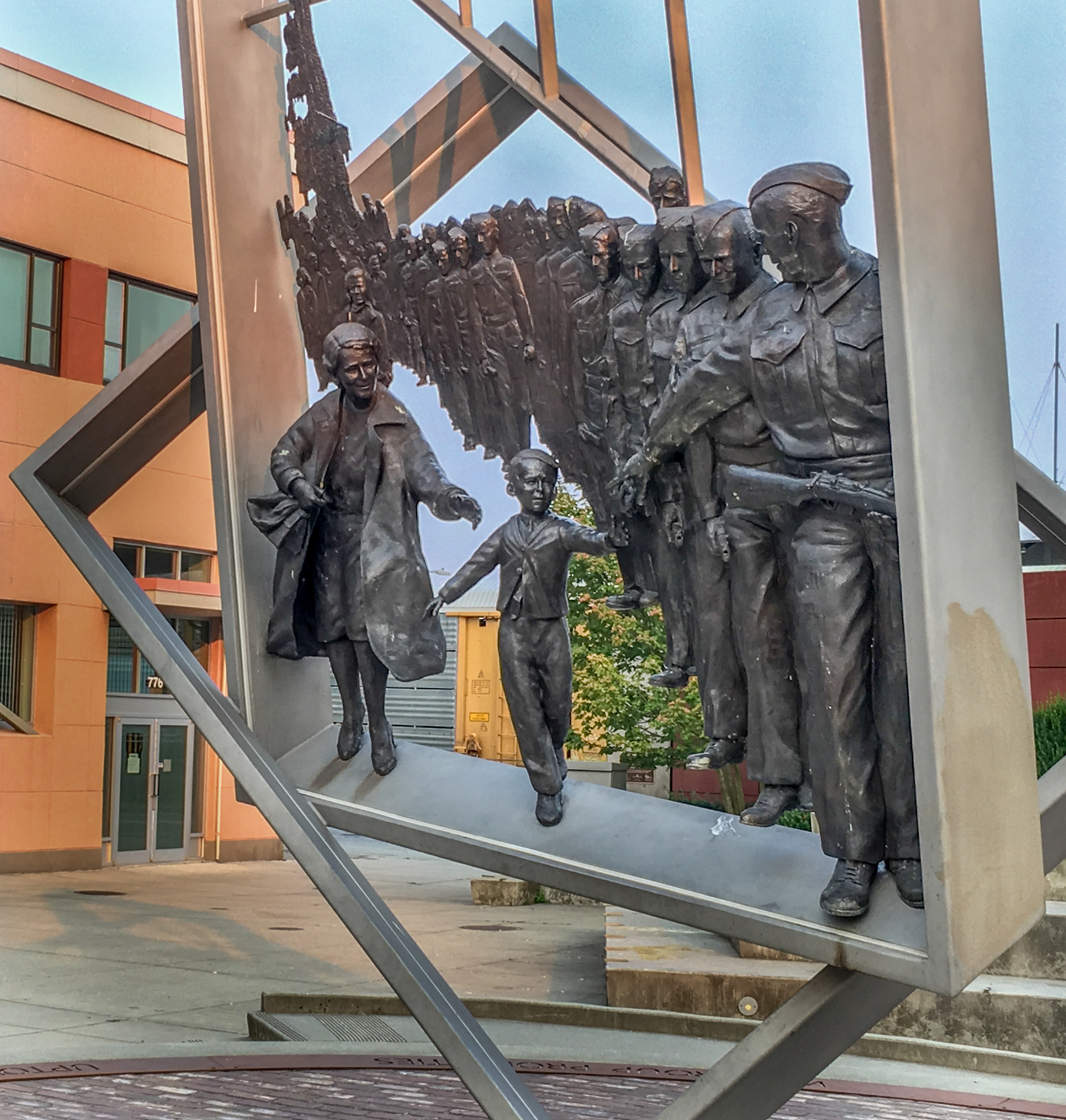
Wait for Me, Daddy (2014), statue in Hyack Square, New Westminster, by Veronica and Edwin Dam de Nogales

The City of New Westminster commissioned a bronze statue honouring the photo to be placed at the bottom of 8th Street, in Hyack Square, to the artistic couple Veronica and Edwin Dam de Nogales. The city unveiled the statue on October 4, 2014. At the same event, the Royal Canadian Mint announced the issue of a series of three coins featuring a scene adapted from the image: it was released in denominations of $2 (alloy), $3 (1/4 troy ounce [7.8 g] silver) and $10 (1/2 troy ounce [16 g] silver).

Canada Post issued a stamp featuring the iconic image.

A re-enactment of the soldiers' march was planned for March 2015, to mark the 70th anniversary of the end of the Second World War.

== Other stories ==
Detloff unwittingly captured a lesser known story in this photograph, though no less characteristic of wartime Canada. On the left-hand side of the photograph, the second woman behind "Whitey's" mother, wearing a dark long coat, necklace, and staring directly toward the camera, is Agnes Confortin (née Power) who had accompanied her friend Phyllis Daem that day to see the young men of New Westminster off.

Even with the limited resolution of the photo, Agnes' somber expression reflects her concern for her two brothers, Wilfred and Larry Power, who had already enlisted in the North Nova Scotia Highlanders. Larry returned to Canada in 1944 with severe post-traumatic stress disorder. Wilfred was killed in action in March 1945 near Arnhem, as part of the First Canadian Army's preparation for the Liberation of Arnhem in April 1945.
