= Claude P. Dettloff =

American photographer

- Born: July 7, 1899; Chippewa Falls, Wisconsin, U.S.
- Died: July 18, 1978 (aged 79); Vancouver, British Columbia, Canada
- Occupation: Photographer
- Known for: The photo Wait for Me, Daddy

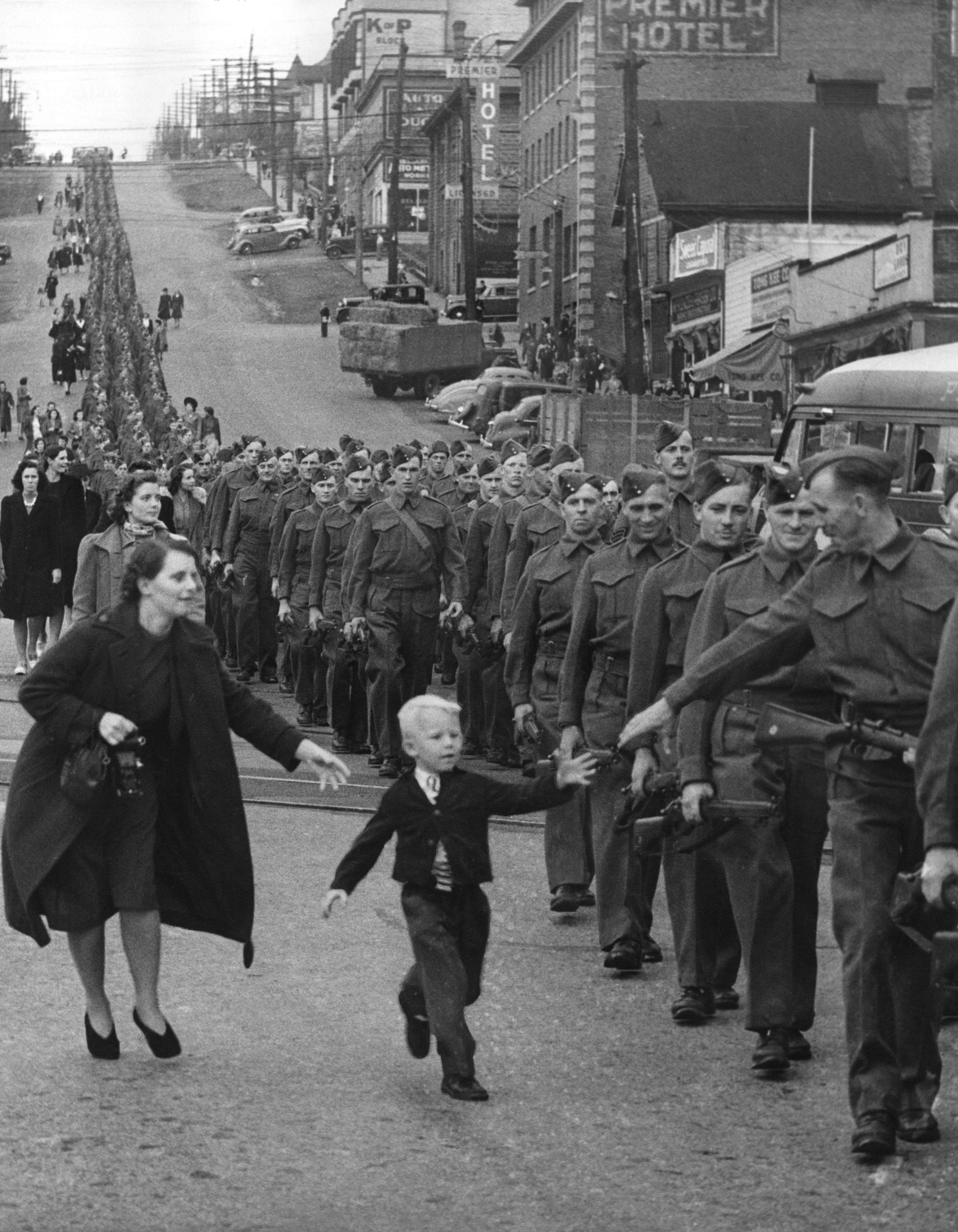
The photo Wait for Me, Daddy, taken by Dettloff, on October 1, 1940

Claude P. Dettloff (July 7, 1899 – July 18, 1978) was an American photographer who gained fame for the picture which has become known as Wait for Me, Daddy. Dettloff began his career with the Minneapolis Journal in 1923 and worked for eleven years with The Winnipeg Tribune. He joined the Vancouver newspaper The Province in 1936, becoming the chief photographer.

Dettloff took the picture on October 1, 1940, as The British Columbia Regiment (Duke of Connaught's Own) went to war. The picture appeared on October 2, 1940, in The Province. The picture was named one of ten best pictures of the 1940s by Life. The picture was taken at 9 meters with a 3¼ × 4¼ Speed Graphic and a 13.5 C. M. Zeiss lens and the exposure was 1/200 of a second at F.8, using Agfa film.
