= Law on the status of Jews =

Antisemitic law in Vichy France

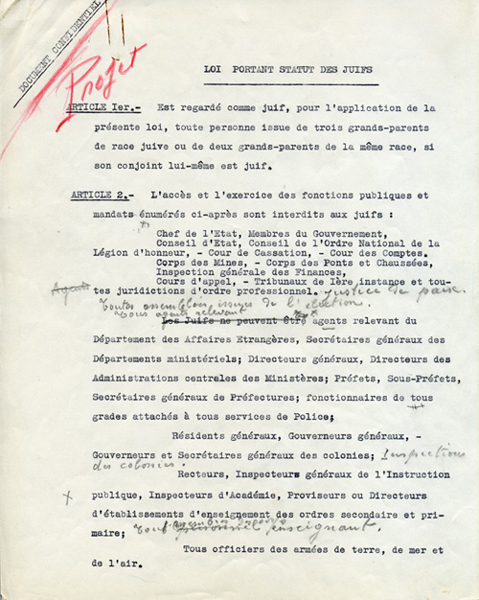
- Draft of page 1 with annotations by Pétain
- Long title: Law of 3 October 1940 on the status of Jews Loi du 3 octobre 1940 portant statut des Juifs
- Territorial extent: Zone libre of France
- Signed by: Philippe Pétain
- Signed: 3 October 1940
- Effective: 3 October 1940

Amends
- 2 June 1941

Amended by
- Second law on the status of Jews (June 1941)

Related legislation
- numerous regulations

Summary
- enumerates occupations prohibited to Jews, and defines who is a Jew
- Status: Void ab initio

The Law of 3 October 1940 on the status of Jews was a law enacted by Vichy France. It provided a legal definition of the expression Jewish race, which was used during the Nazi occupation for the implementation of Vichy's ideological policy of "National Revolution" comprising corporatist and antisemitic racial policies. It also listed the occupations forbidden to Jews meeting the definition. The law was signed by Marshall Philippe Pétain and the main members of his government.

The Vichy regime was nominally independent, unlike the northern, Occupied zone, which was under direct occupation by Nazi Germany. The Pétain regime didn't wait to be ordered to draw up antisemitic measures by the Nazis, but took them on their own initiative. Antisemitic measures began to be drawn up almost immediately after Pétain signed the Armistice of 22 June 1940, ending hostilities and establishing the terms of France's surrender to the Germans, including the division of France into the occupied and free zones.

The law was signed one day before the Law regarding foreign nationals of the Jewish race which authorized and organized the internment of foreign Jews and marked the beginning of the policy of collaboration of the Vichy regime with Nazi Germany's plans for the extermination of the Jews of Europe. These two laws were published simultaneously in the Journal officiel de la République française on 18 October 1940.

This "law of exception" (Note: A "law of exception" in France, is a law which is exempt from the normal constraints of common law, due to exceptional or momentary circumstances.) was enacted in defiance of the positions of the Council of State. The Council of State was still in place since the National Assembly was no longer in power after 11 July 1940 when it granted full powers to Philippe Pétain.

The law was replaced on 14 June 1941 by the Second law on the status of Jews.

== See also ==
- Collaboration with the Axis Powers during World War II
- French Fourth Republic
- French Third Republic
- German occupation of France
- History of the Jews in France
- Vichy anti-Jewish legislation
- Vichy France
- Vichy Holocaust collaboration timeline
- Zone libre

== Works cited ==
- Bruttmann, Tal [in French] (2008). "La mise en oeuvre du statut des Juifs du 3 octobre 1940" [Implementation of the law on Jews of 3 October 1940]. Archives Juives. Revue d'histoire des juifs de France (in French). 41 (1). Les Belles Lettres: 11–24. doi:10.3917/aj.411.0011. ISSN 0003-9837. Archived from the original on 11 April 2015.
- Epstein, Mortimer (1942). "The Statesman's Year-Book : Statistical and Historical Annual of the States of the World for the Year 1942". The Statesman's Year-Book. 79. Palgrave Macmillan. OCLC 1086492287. "Legal position of Jews in Vichy France.—Almost immediately after the armistice, the Vichy government proclaimed its intention to deprive of their civil rights French people who are of Jewish faith or origin, and to place the Jews in the position of legal inferiority in which they find themselves in all other German-dominated countries. On October 3, 1940 (Journel Officiel of October 18), a law was published fixing the conditions under which a person is considered as being of Jewish origin. Access to all public offices, professions, journalism, executive positions in the film industry, etc. was prohibited to all such persons."
- Fresco, Nadine (4 March 2021) [1st pub. La mort des juifs. Paris : Seuil, 2008]. On the Death of Jews: Photographs and History. Translated by Clift, Sarah. New York: Berghahn Books. ISBN 978-1-78920-882-5. OCLC 1226797554. "On the preceding page, the law from the day before (3 October 1940), signed by Marshall Philip Pétain and nine of his ministers, is the 'law on the status of the Jews.' We know that those in charge of Vichy, 'complicit even before having understood the inevitable extent of their own compromise', did not wait for it to be imposed by the occupying power before enacting it.^{73} We also know that whereas the German ordinance of the preceding month defined Jews by 'religion', the French statute of 3 October defined them by race.^{74}"
- Geddes, Andrew; Favell, Adrian (1999). The Politics of Belonging: Migrants and Minorities in Contemporary Europe (government pub.). Contemporary trends in European social sciences. Aldershot: Ashgate. ISBN 978-1-84014-177-1. OCLC 470276345. "The laws of October 1940 organized and entrenched discrimination towards Jews and foreigners (law of October 3 1940 concerning the status of Jews; law of October 4 1940 concerning ' alien residents of the Jewish race'."
- Joly, Laurent (2008). "L'administration française et le statut du 2 juin 1941" [French administration and the law of 2 June 1941]. Archives Juives. Revue d'histoire des juifs de France. 41 (1). Paris: fr:Les Belles Lettres: 25–40. doi:10.3917/aj.411.0025. ISSN 1965-0531. OCLC 793455446. Archived from the original on 21 March 2015. "This ... was reflected in the drafting of the law of 2 June. In close collaboration and in perfect symbiosis with Admiral Darlan's services and the ministries concerned, the General Commission for Jewish Questions tightened the definition of a Jew (in order to escape the increased strictures of the law, "demi-Jews" had to have belonged to some religion other than Judaism before 25 June 1940) and extended the scope of prohibited occupations. Ce ... se ressent dans la rédaction de la loi du 2 juin. En étroite collaboration et en parfaite symbiose avec les services de l'amiral Darlan et les ministères concernés, le commissariat général aux Questions juives aggrave la définition du Juif (les « demi-juifs » doivent obligatoirement avoir adhéré à une religion autre que la religion juive avant le 25 juin 1940 pour échapper aux rigueurs de la loi) et étend le champ des interdictions professionnelles."
- Klarsfeld, Serge (1983). Memorial to the Jews Deported from France, 1942-1944: Documentation of the Deportation of the Victims of the Final Solution in France. B. Klarsfeld Foundation. OCLC 970847660. "3) A law of October 3, 1940, on the status of Jews excluded them from most public and private professions and defined Jews on the basis of racial criteria."
- Rayski, Adam; Bédarida, François; Sayers, Will; United States Holocaust Memorial Museum (2005). The Choice of the Jews Under Vichy: Between Submission and Resistance. University of Notre Dame Press. ISBN 978-0-268-04021-5. OCLC 954784575. ""on 3 October, Vichy promulgated the 'Law Concerning the Status of Jews,' signed by Pétain and the principal members of his government."
- Rémy, Dominique (1992). Les lois de Vichy: actes dits 'lois' de l'autorité de fait se prétendant 'gouvernement de l'Etat français' [The Vichy laws: acts called 'laws' of the de facto authority claiming to be the 'government of the French state'] (in French). Editions Romillat. ISBN 978-2-87894-026-8. OCLC 1038535440.
