= Commissariat-General for Jewish Affairs =

Anti-Jewish commission of the French Vichy Government

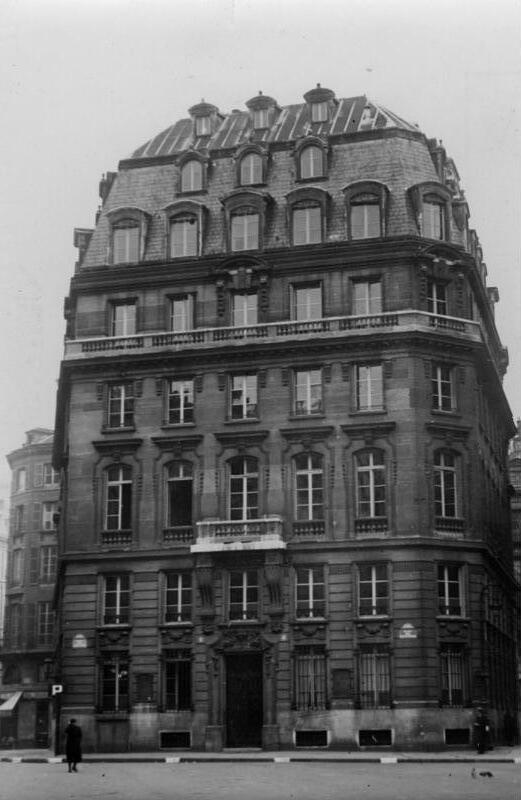
The headquarters of the C.G.Q.J., located in the former Banque Louis-Dreyfus

The Commissariat-General for Jewish Affairs (French: Commissariat général aux questions juives; C.G.Q.J.) was a special administration established in March 1941 by the collaborationist Vichy government of France in order to introduce anti-Jewish legislation.

== History ==
While anti-Jewish legislation had already been introduced by the Vichy regime by October 1940, the creation of the C.G.Q.J. was initiated by the German occupiers. SS-Hauptsturmführer Theodor Dannecker, Judenreferent in France, called in his memoir for the establishment of a "Jewish central office" on 21 January 1941. The C.G.Q.J. was founded by the law of 29 March 1941, with Xavier Vallat as Commissioner-General, followed by Louis Darquier de Pellepoix in May 1942.

The organization was responsible for proposing all legislative measures concerning Jews to the Vichy government, such as the confiscation of Jewish property in France. The Commissariat also introduced discriminatory measures against Romani people, likewise targets of Nazi racial policies.

After Darquier de Pellepoix was expelled from office on 26 February 1944, Charles du Paty de Clam was appointed Commissioner-General on 1 March 1944, mainly because he was the son of Alfred Dreyfus' accuser, Armand du Paty de Clam. Accused of passivity and disinterest towards the aryanisation process, he was quickly replaced with Joseph Antignac on 17 May 1944.

By spring 1944, the Commissariat was dismissed as ineffective by French antisemitic newspapers: the SS had to conduct deportations practically on their own during this period and communications between the Judenreferat and Vichy virtually ceased. Germans had therefore to rely on one source of collaboration to carry on the Holocaust in France: the paramilitary Milice.

Approximately 2,500 people were employed by the Commissariat-General between 1941 and 1944. The organization was eventually disbanded on 17 August 1944, followed by the Liberation of Paris two days later.

== List of Commissioners-General ==
No.	Portrait	Name (Lifespan)	Term of office			Notes
No.	Portrait	Name (Lifespan)	Took office	Left office	Time in office	Notes
1		Xavier Vallat (1891–1972)	29 March 1941	8 May 1942	1 year, 40 days	
2		Louis Darquier de Pellepoix (1897–1980)	8 May 1942	26 February 1944	1 year, 294 days	
3		Charles du Paty de Clam (1895–1948)	1 March 1944	17 May 1944	77 days	
4		Joseph Antignac (1895–1976)	17 May 1944	17 August 1944	92 days	Served with the title "Secretary-General".

== Bibliography ==
- Joly, Laurent (2006). Vichy dans la "solution finale". Grasset. ISBN 978-2246638490.
- Marrus, Michael Robert; Paxton, Robert O. (1981). Vichy France and the Jews. Stanford University Press. ISBN 978-0804724999.

== See also ==
- Union générale des israélites de France
