= Laurent Joly =

French historian (born 1976)

Laurent Joly (born 26 July 1976) is a French historian and a specialist of Vichy France and antisemitism.

== Life and career ==
Born in 1976, Joly earned a doctorate in history at the Pantheon-Sorbonne University, following a thesis on "Vichy and the Commissariat-General for Jewish Affairs (1941-1944)". He joined the CNRS in 2006, and was a member of the Research Center for Quantitative History until January 2015.

Joly is now a Research Director at the CNRS. He earned the "prize of the Jewish research book" in 2007.

== Works ==
- Xavier Vallat (1891-1972) : du nationalisme chrétien à l'antisémitisme d'État. Grasset, 2001. (ISBN 978-2-246-60831-8).
- Darquier de Pellepoix et l'antisémitisme français. Berg international, 2002. (ISBN 2-911289-49-8).
- Vichy dans la « Solution finale » : histoire du Commissariat général aux questions juives (1941-1944). Grasset, 2006. (ISBN 2-246-63841-0)
- La France antijuive de 1936 : l'agression de Léon Blum à la Chambre des députés. (with Tal Bruttmann) Éditions des Équateurs, 2006. (ISBN 2-246-60831-7)
- L'Antisémitisme de bureau : enquête au cœur de la Préfecture de police de Paris et du Commissariat général aux questions juives (1940-1944). Grasset, 2011. (ISBN 978-2-246-73691-2)
- Les collabos : treize portraits d'après les archives des services secrets de Vichy, des RG et de l'Épuration. Les Échappés, 2011 (ISBN 978-2-35766-045-8)
- Naissance de l'Action française : Maurice Barrès, Charles Maurras et l'extrême droite nationaliste au tournant du XXe siècle. Grasset, 2015. (ISBN 978-2-246-81160-2)
- Dénoncer les Juifs sous l'Occupation : Paris, 1940-1944. CNRS Éditions, 2017. (ISBN 978-2-271-09432-2)
- L'État contre les juifs : Vichy, les nazis et la persécution antisémite. Grasset, 2018. (ISBN 978-2-24686-299-4)
- La falsification de l'Histoire: Eric Zemmour, l'extrême droite, Vichy et les juifs. Grasset, 2022. (ISBN 978-2246830818)
