= Zone libre =

Territory administered by Vichy France during World War II

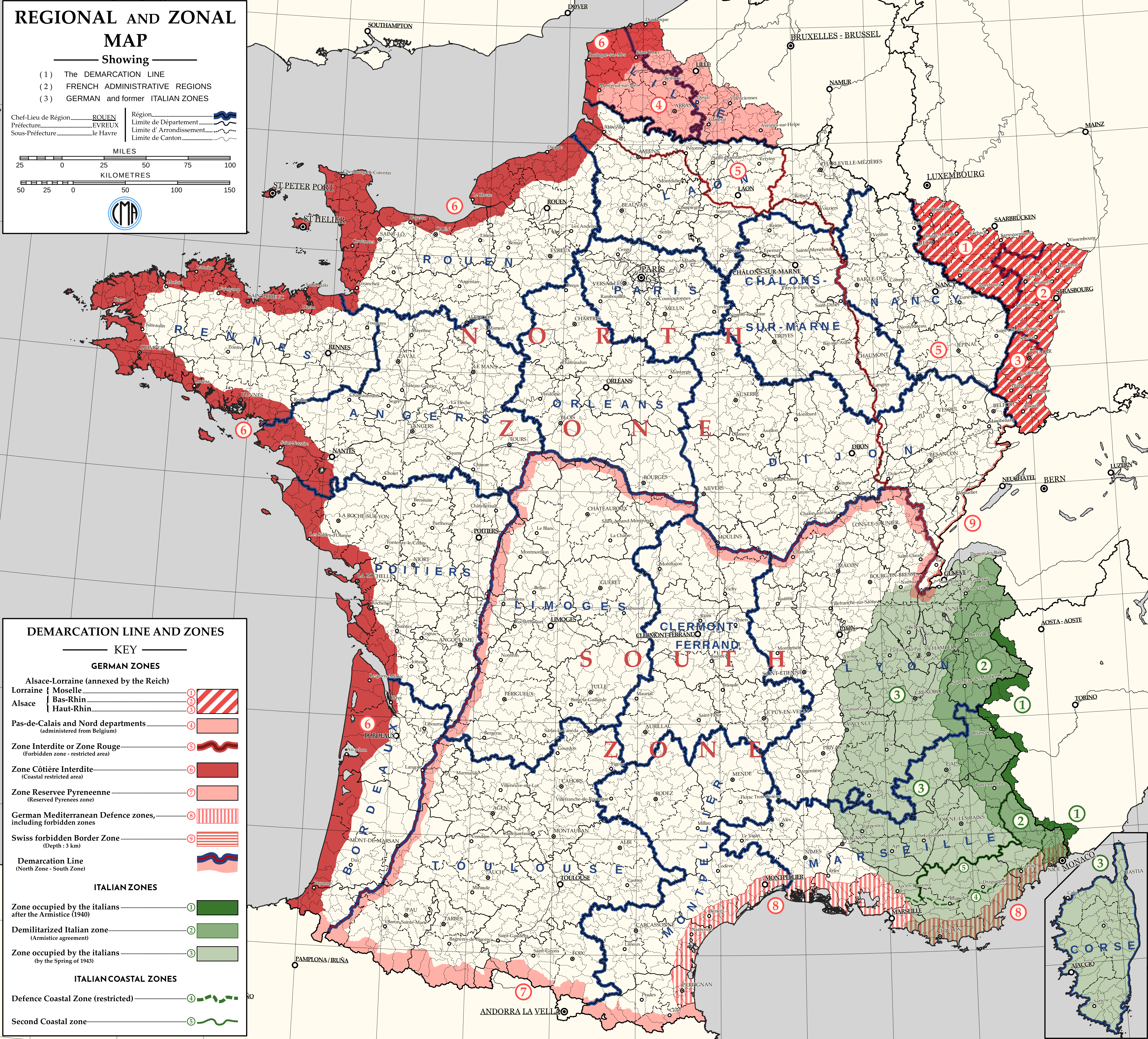
Occupied France during World War II, showing German and Italian occupation zones, the zone occupée, the zone libre, the Military Administration in Belgium and Northern France, annexed Alsace-Lorraine, and the zone interdite

The zone libre (French pronunciation: [zon libʁ], lit. 'free zone') was a partition of the French metropolitan territory during World War II, established at the Second Armistice at Compiègne on 22 June 1940. It lay to the south of the demarcation line and was administered by the French government of Philippe Pétain based in Vichy, in a relatively unrestricted fashion. To the north lay the zone occupée ('occupied zone'), in which the powers of Vichy France were severely limited.

In November 1942, the zone libre was invaded by the German and Italian armies in Case Anton, as a response to Operation Torch, the Allied landings in North Africa. Thenceforth, the zone libre and zone occupée were renamed the zone sud ('southern zone') and zone nord (northern zone) respectively. From then on both were under German military administration.

== Origins of the zone libre ==
On 22 June 1940, after the Battle of France, Wilhelm Keitel, representing Nazi Germany, and Charles Huntziger, representing Pétain's government, signed an armistice at the Rethondes clearing in the forest of Compiègne, which stipulated in its second article:

With a view to safeguarding the interests of the German Reich, the French territory situated to the north and west of the line drawn on the map here attached will be occupied by German troops.

The line separating French territory into two zones was defined on a map attached to the treaty.

[...] begins, in the East, at the Franco-Swiss border near Geneva, and goes by the localities of Dole, Paray-le-Monial and Bourges up to about twenty kilometres to the East of Tours. Thence, it passes at a distance of twenty kilometres to the east of the Tours-Angoulême-Libourne railway line, then further by Mont-de-Marsan and Orthez, up to the Spanish border.

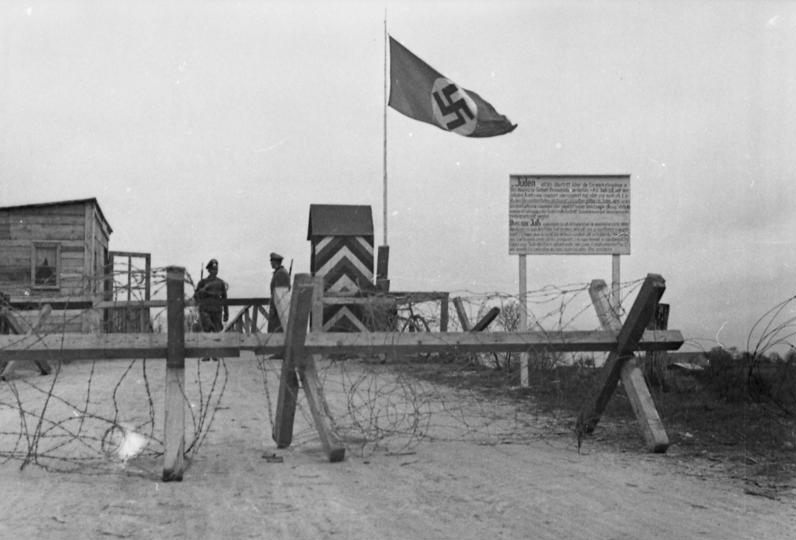
A German post on the demarcation line between the occupied and free zones near Tours in 1941

This separation line took effect on 25 June 1940. It was thereafter referred to as the ligne de démarcation.

French sovereignty persisted throughout the whole territory, including the zone occupée (except for Alsace and Moselle, which had been annexed), but the terms of the armistice in its third article stipulated that Germany would exercise the rights of an occupying power in the zone occupée.

In the occupied parts of France, the German Reich will exercise all rights of an occupying power. The French government commits itself to facilitate by all means the regulations pertaining to the exercising of these rights, and to putting them in place with the cooperation of the French administration. The French government will immediately invite all authorities and administrative services in the occupied territories to conform to the regulation of the German military authorities and to work with the latter in a proper manner.

When the Allies invaded North Africa on 8 November 1942, the Germans and Italians immediately occupied the remaining free part of France. After being renamed zone sud ('south zone'), it was thereafter ruled by the Wehrmacht as a part of occupied France.

The liberation of France began on 6 June 1944 with the Allied forces landing on D-Day, the Battle of Normandy, and the Allied landing in Provence on August 15. Most of France was liberated by September 1944.

=== Extent of the zone libre ===
The zone libre constituted a land area of 246,618 square kilometres (95,220 sq mi), approximately 45% of France, and included approximately 33% of the total French labour force. The ligne de démarcation passed through 13 of the 90 departments:

- Basses-Pyrénées (Pyrénées-Atlantiques since 1969)
- Landes
- Gironde
- Dordogne
- Charente
- Vienne
- Indre-et-Loire
- Loir-et-Cher
- Cher
- Allier
- Saône-et-Loire
- Jura
- Ain

Of the other 77 departments, 42 lay entirely within the zone libre and 35 lay entirely within the zone occupée.

== Theories about the separation of the zones ==
For the historian Éric Alary, the partitioning of France into two main zones, libre and occupée, was partly inspired by the fantasy of pan-Germanist writers, particularly a work by a certain Adolf Sommerfeld, published in 1912 and translated into French under the title Le Partage de la France, which contained a map showing a France partitioned between Germany and Italy according to a line which partly matched that of 1940.

Henri Espieux suggests: "During the occupation, the Franciens were separated from the Occitans by the infamous "demarcation line". For a long time, we thought that the shape of this line was suggested to Hitler by the Romance-language specialists within his entourage. Now we believe that this border was imposed upon the occupying power by well-known geopolitical realities."

== Jews in the free zone ==
Jews in the zone libre were directly targeted by antisemitic legislation from the Vichy government. Though the free zone was not under direct Nazi control from 1940 to 1942, many of the laws made in these years mirrored the policies of Nazi Germany and German-occupied France despite their completely French origin.

Vichy anti-Jewish legislation was made and enforced by the Vichy government which had administrative and military control in the zone libre, as opposed to the Occupied zone where Germany was a military occupying force. The Law on the status of Jews was signed by Pétain on 3 October 1940, three months after the zone libre was formed. These laws barred Jews from many aspects of daily life including work and naturalization as French citizens. Three quarters of Jews in France who lost their jobs from this statute were from the zone libre. Jews' new classification as foreign made them more at risk for harsh punishment as “foreigners” rather than citizens. House arrest or being arrested and placed into one of the internment camps in France was a common fate. Breaking any French law or anti-Jewish statute could lead to their expulsion if accused by a neighbor or officer. Jews continued to be stripped of their rights and forced out of French society over the two years of existence of the zone libre.

Official justification for the laws varied slightly but held with the top-down anti-Semitism characteristic of the Vichy government at this time. The General Commission on Jewish Affairs stated plainly that these laws were justified in their moral humiliation of Jews and were completely of French origin. The narrative of Jews in France being parasitic was pushed by Vichy France in official statements but was relatively subdued until the last six months of the zone libre when outright antisemitism became a fundamental aspect of Vichy policy.

== Free zone and Italy ==
On 24 June 1940, two days after the armistice with Germany, the Vichy government signed an armistice with the Italians at the villa Incisa in Olgiata near Rome, instituting a zone of Italian occupation. The Italian occupation zone concerned certain border areas conquered by Italian troops, including Menton. This zone was of limited importance, comprising 800 square kilometres (310 sq mi) and 28,000 inhabitants. Four departments were partially covered by the Italian occupation: Alpes-Maritimes, Basses-Alpes (Alpes-de-Haute-Provence since 1970), Hautes-Alpes and Savoie.

In addition, a demilitarised zone was established containing all French territory within 50 kilometres (31 mi) from the zone of Italian occupation. The department of Corsica (split into two departments since 1976) was neither occupied nor demilitarized by any provision of the armistice (although it was occupied by Italy after Case Anton).

== End of the free zone ==
On 8 November 1942, Allied forces invaded French North Africa (Operation Torch). German and Italian forces responded on 11 November 1942 by invading the zone libre in Case Anton (based on a previous plan called Operation Attila, which had not included any Italian forces). The zone libre became the zone sud (south zone) from November 1942 onwards; the invading powers shared out its territory between themselves, with a region covering practically the whole area east of the Rhône passing to the Italians. After the capitulation of Italy at Cassibile became public knowledge on 8 September 1943, the Italian armies retreated and the Germans united the southern zone under their own exclusive control. The German military administration in France ruled both zone sud and zone nord; the Vichy regime remained nominally in charge, as it had in the zone occupée.

== Other names ==
Until November 1942, the Germans called the zone libre "Unbesetztes Gebiet" or unoccupied zone. The zone libre was also nicknamed the zone nono by the French, shortened from non occupée ('unoccupied'). The occupied zone accordingly became the zone jaja ('yes-yes zone'). The zone libre was also called the royaume du maréchal ("Marshal Philippe Pétain's kingdom") by the French author Jacques Delperrié de Bayac.
