= Vichy anti-Jewish legislation =

Laws enacted in 1940 and 1941

Anti-Jewish laws were enacted by the Vichy France government in 1940 and 1941 affecting metropolitan France and its overseas territories during World War II. These laws were, in fact, decrees of head of state Marshal Philippe Pétain, since Parliament was no longer in office as of 11 July 1940. The motivation for the legislation was spontaneous and was not mandated by Germany. These laws were declared null and void on 9 August 1944 after liberation and on the restoration of republican legality.

The statutes were aimed at depriving Jews of the right to hold public office, designating them as a lower class, and depriving them of citizenship. Many Jews were subsequently rounded up at Drancy internment camp before being deported for extermination in Nazi concentration camps.

== History ==
The denaturalization law was enacted on 16 July 1940, barely a month after the announcement of the Vichy regime of Petain. On 22 July 1940, the Deputy Secretary of State Raphaël Alibert created a committee to review 500,000 naturalisations given since 1927. This resulted in 15,000 people having their French nationality revoked, of whom 40% were Jews. Alibert was the signatory of the Statutes on Jews.

The first Jewish status law (Le Statut des Juifs) dated 3 October 1940 excluded Jews from professions that shaped public opinion: they could no longer work for print and radio news, in the movie and theater industries, or in education. They were also dismissed from high-level positions in the French civil service, and as officers in the military.

Further, the law placed strict limits on the jobs still available to Jews. Those who had served in World War One, or had distinguished themselves in the campaign of 1939-1940, could hold menial positions in the government and military. The statute also stated that a quota system would be devised to limit the presence of Jews in professional fields like law and medicine.

Article 9 of the Status stated that it applied to the French territories of Vichy France Algeria, the colonies, the Protectorates of Tunisia and Morocco, and the Mandates of Lebanon and Syria.

A second status law was passed in July 1941. It tightened the previous law, removing Jews from even menial public, military, and civil service positions. It also barred Jews from engaging in finance or the extension of credit, which in turn prevented many from owning businesses.

The Vichy regime also limited Jews to 14% of public school students, eventually forbidding their access to public education altogether.

A Vichy law of 7 October 1940 (published 8 October in the Journal Officiel) abrogated the Cremieux decree, stripping the Jewish population of Algeria of its citizenship.

A further law regarding foreign Jewish nationals of 4 October 1940, promulgated simultaneously with the Jewish status laws, allowed for the immediate internment of foreign Jews. Under the law 40,000 Jews were interned in various camps in the Zone libre, the Southern Zone: Nexon, Agde, Gurs, Noé, Récébédou, Rivesaltes, and Le Vernet. On 1 July 1940, the Germans had expelled thousands of French Jews of Alsace and Lorraine to the Zone libre. Some settled in cities such as Limoges, others finished up in the camps such as Gurs.

These laws were copied from Nazi laws or ordinances, so that they were equally harsh for their victims. These laws were more rigorous than the Italian Racial Laws in occupied Nice. These laws of limitation were put into place from the start of the new regime by Pétain: the first law was put into place barely one month after the Vichy government was established.

In the twelve months starting October 1940, 26 laws, 24 decrees, and six ordinances concerning Jews were promulgated. Vichy anticipated the Germans, who then promulgated their own laws, which Vichy picked up and adopted in turn. Vichy freely adopted aryanization so that by mid-1941, half of the Jewish population had no income, were forbidden from having radios, changing residence, and were restricted in the hours they could go out in public.

The collaborationist regime also put into practice the Nazi policy on hunting Jews, that was enforced by the French police, sending the captive Jews to railway stations where they would be sent to French concentration camps as part of the Final Solution.

Similar legislation was subsequently applied by Algeria (7 October 1940), Morocco (31 October), and Tunisia (30 November), which at the time were Vichy possessions or protectorates.

== Responsibility ==
The Vichy government voluntarily adopted, without coercion from the German forces, laws that excluded Jews and their children from certain roles in society. According to Marshal Philippe Pétain's chief of staff, "Germany was not at the origin of the anti-Jewish legislation of Vichy. That legislation was spontaneous and autonomous." These laws were declared null and void by the Ordinance of 9 August 1944 after liberation and on the restoration of republican legality.

== Other groups ==
Other categories of the population, such as Freemasons and communists, were also oppressed by this Vichy regime. Until the invasion of the Soviet Union on 22 June 1941 the hunt for communists was not a high priority on the Nazi agenda, because of the signing of the Nazi-Soviet Pact on 23 August 1939.

== List of laws ==
Date	Law or act	ref	Remarks
1940-10-03	Law on the status of Jews		who is a Jew; prohibited professions
1940-10-04	Law regarding foreign nationals of the Jewish race		internment of foreign Jews
1940-10-07	Abrogation of Cremieux Decree		
1941-06-02	Second law on the status of Jews		replaced the first Statut des Juifs to make it stricter

== See also ==
- Maurice Papon
- History of the Jews in France
