= Timeline of collaboration between Nazi Germany and Vichy France =

Led by Philippe Pétain, the Vichy regime that replaced the French Third Republic in 1940 chose the path of collaboration with the Nazi occupiers. This policy included the Bousquet-Oberg accords of July 1942 that formalized the collaboration of the French police with the German police. This collaboration was manifested in particular by antisemitic measures taken by the Vichy government, and by its active participation in the genocide.

The terms Zone libre (Free Zone), Vichy France, Vichy regime, southern zone, French State, and État français are all synonyms and refer to the state in the south of France governed from Vichy during World War II and headed by French World War I hero Marshal Philippe Pétain. The terms Zone occupée (Occupied Zone), Occupied France, and northern zone refer to the northern portion of France governed by the German military administration in Paris, taking orders from Berlin.

== 1940 ==
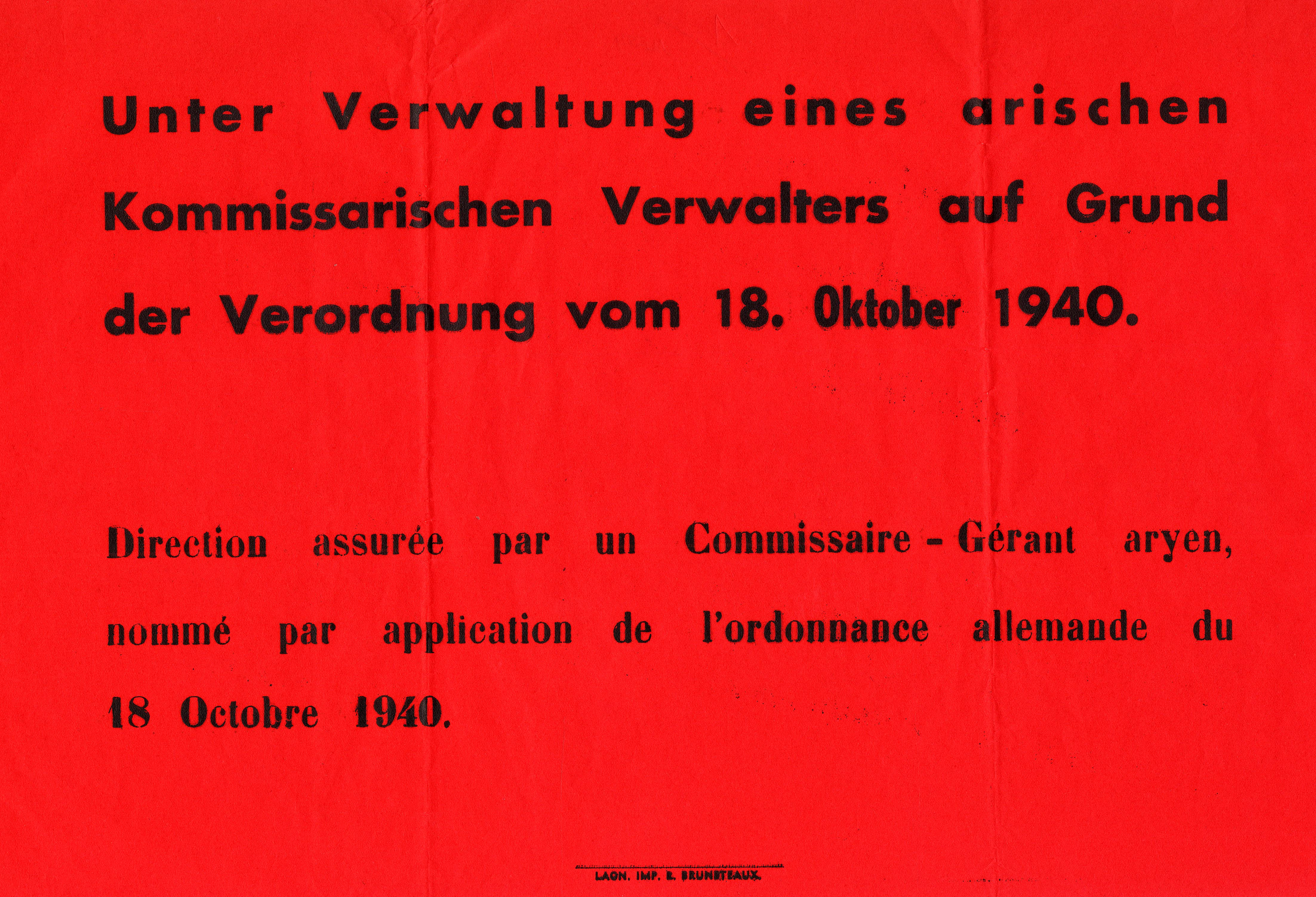
Posters affixed on Jewish businesses in the Department of Aisne after October 1940 as part of the Aryanization policy, indicating the appointment of an Aryan commissioner-manager. (Departmental Archives of the Aisne)

- July 10, 1940: Pierre Laval induces Parliament to vote complete powers (constituent, legislative, executive and judicial) to Marshal Philippe Pétain who becomes Head of state of the French State (État français).
- July 21, 1940: Minister of Justice Raphaël Alibert creates a board to review 500,000 naturalizations accorded since 1927. Withdrawal of nationality for 15,000 people, 40% of whom were Jews.
- July 1940: Germans expel more than 20,000 Alsace-Lorraine Jews to the southern zone.
- September 27, 1940: Ordinance on the status of Jews in the Occupied Zone. A census of Jews ("the Tulard file") and obligatory sign "Juif" meaning "Jew" on shops owned by Jews.
- September 27, 1940: A Vichy law allows any foreigner "excessive to the national economy" to be interned among "groups of foreign workers".
- October 3, 1940: first law on the status of Jews. French Jewish citizens are excluded from civil service, army, education, the press, radio and film. "Surplus" Jews are excluded from the professions. Article 9: This law is applicable to Algeria, to the colonies, protectorates and mandated territories.
- October 4, 1940: prefects can detain foreigners of Jewish extraction in special camps or to assign residence.
- October 7, 1940: repeal of the 1871 Crémieux Decree; French nationality is removed from Jews from Algeria.
- October 7, 1940: Aryanization of businesses in the Occupied Zone.

== 1941 ==
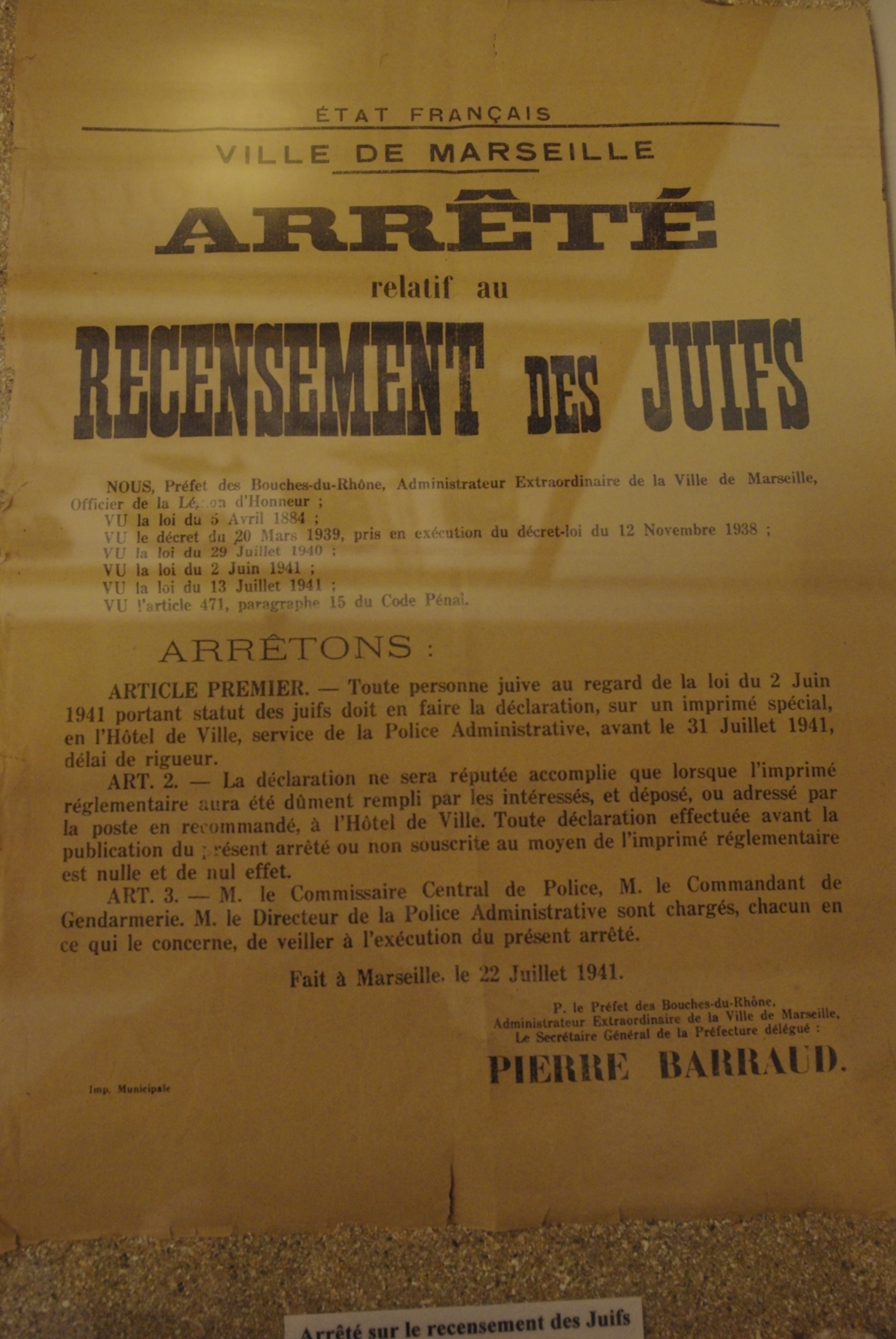
Poster distributed in Marseilles in July 1941 announcing the Jewish census.

- March 29, 1941: creation of the Commissariat-General for Jewish Affairs (CGQJ), with Xavier Vallat as the first commissioner.
- May 11, 1941: Creation of the Institut d'étude des questions juives, an anti-Semitic propaganda agency, financed by the Nazis (Theodor Dannecker) and directed by French antisemitic agitators Paul Sézille, René Gérard and others.
- May 14, 1941: the green ticket roundup (rafle du billet vert) organized by the Prefecture of Police with the agreement of the general delegation of the French government in the occupied zone and upon demand by the occupying authorities: 3,747 Jewish foreigners, (out of 6,494 summoned by the prefecture) were crammed into the Pithiviers and Beaune-la-Rolande internment camps under French administration.
- June 2, 1941: Second law on the status of Jews Law of 2 June 194, the second law concerning Jews. Compared to the first one, an increasingly stringent definition of who is a Jew, additional professional work restrictions, quotas in University (3%) and the liberal professions (2%). Jews were obligated to take part in a census in the Zone libre. Article 11 of the Statute: "This law is applicable to Algeria, the colonies, protectorates and territories under mandate. This law authorizes prefects to perform administrative detention of Jews of French nationality.".
- July 21, 1941: Aryanization of Jewish companies in the Zone libre.
- August 1941: Occupied zone: internment of 3,200 foreign and 1,000 French Jews in various camps including Drancy.
- November 29, 1941: creation of the UGIF (Union générale des israélites de France), facilitating the tracking and classification of Jews in France. Created by decree under pressure by Nazi Germany.
- December 1941: Occupied zone: 740 French Jews, members of the liberal and intellectual professions, interned in Compiègne.

== 1942 ==
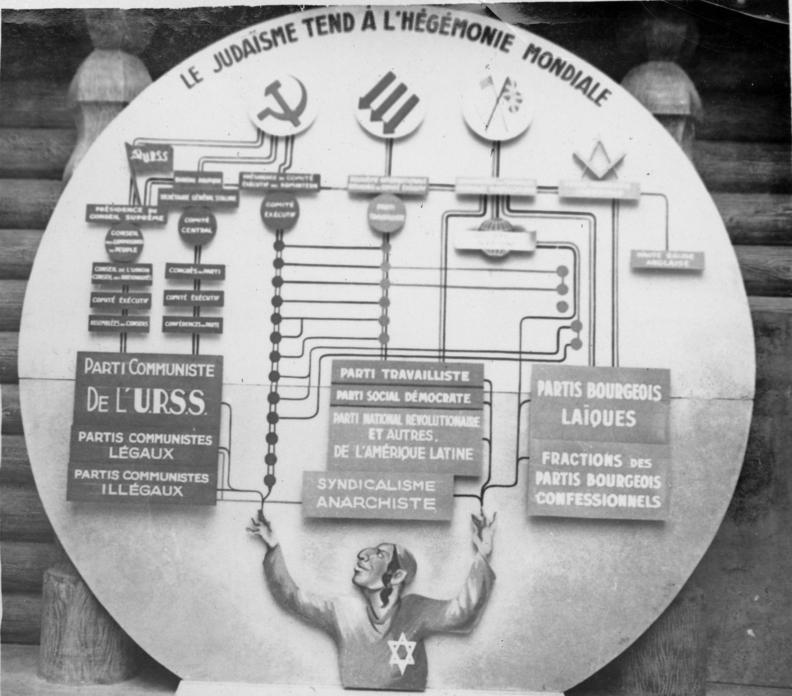
Antisemitic propaganda poster from 1942 showing "the tendency of Judaism toward world hegemony" (by the Anti-Bolshevik Action Committee)

- January 1942: Wannsee Conference: Nazi officials define the practical arrangements for the "Final Solution", that is to say, the complete extermination of European Jewry, including children.
- 27 March 1942: The first convoy of Jewish deportees leaves Compiègne (Frontstalag 122) towards an extermination camp.
- May 20, 1942: Occupied zone: Compulsory wearing of yellow Jewish star badge. (effective June 7).
- July 2, 1942: Oberg-Bousquet agreement for collaboration between French and German police, in the presence of Reinhard Heydrich, Himmler's deputy.
- July 16–17, 1942: Roundup of the Vel d'Hiv: arrest of 13,152 "stateless" Jews (3,031 men, 5,802 women and 4,051 children).
- July 19, 1942: failed Roundup of Nancy, after Jews were warned overnight to flee by Nancy Police Commissioner for Foreign Affairs Édouard Vigneron.
- 26–28 August 1942 Zone libre: series of roundups resulting in the deportation of 7,000 people.

== 1943 ==
- January 1943: Roundup of Marseille: destruction of the Old Port and roundups by French authorities. Nearly 2,000 Marseilles Jews arrested and deported. Le Petit Marseillais of January 30, 1943 wrote: "Note that the evacuation operations in the Northern district of the Old Port were carried out exclusively by French police and that no incidents were reported. The Opera district, where many Sephardic families lived, was emptied of its inhabitants.
- February 1943: Lyon raid on the premises of the Union générale des israélites de France (UGIF, General Union of French Jews).
- April 1943: Nîmes and Avignon roundups.
- September 1943: roundups of Nice and surrounding area.
- September 8, 1943: surrender of Italy leading to the Allied occupation of Italian-occupied France hitherto spared from roundups.

== 1944 ==
- February 1944: roundups of Grenoble and Isère.
- August 15, 1944: last deportation convoy from Clermont-Ferrand.

== Publications ==
- Azéma, Jean-Pierre; Bédarida, François (1993). La France des années noires, tome 2 : De l'Occupation à la Libération [The black years in France: from occupation to liberation]. Vol. 2. Le Seuil. ISBN 2020183056.
- Joseph Billig, Le Commissariat général aux questions juives (1940-1944), [The general commission for Jewish affairs 1940044], éditions du Centre, Paris, 3 vol., 1955–1960.
- Tal Bruttmann, Au bureau des affaires juives. L’administration française et l’application de la législation antisémite (1940-1944), [At the Jewish affairs bureau. French administration and the application of antisemitic legislation 1940-44], La Découverte, Paris, 2006.
- Tal Bruttmann (ed.), Persécutions et spoliations des Juifs pendant la Seconde Guerre mondiale, [Persecution and plundering of Jews during the second world war], Presses universitaires de Grenoble, Grenoble, 2004.
- Laurent Douzou, Voler les juifs. Lyon, 1940-1944, [Robbing the Jews], Hachette, 2002.
- Renée Dray-Bensousan, Les Juifs à Marseille (1940-1944), [Marseille Jews 1940-44], Les Belles Lettres, Paris, 2004.
- Jean-Marc Dreyfus, Pillages sur ordonnances. Aryanisation et restitution des banques en France, 1940-1953, [Legal plunder. Aryanization and the reestablishment of French banking, 1940-1953], Fayard, Paris, 2003.
- Michaël Iancu, Spoliations déportations, résistance des Juifs à Montpellier et dans l’Hérault (1940-1944), [Plunder, deportation, resistance of Montpelier Jews and in the Hérault], éditions Alain Barthélémy, Avignon, 2000.
- Laurent Joly, Vichy dans la « solution finale ». Histoire du Commissariat général aux questions juives, 1941-1944, [Vichy and the "final solution". History of the general commission for Jewish affairs, 1941-44], Grasset, Paris, 2006.
- André Kaspi, Les Juifs pendant l’Occupation, [Jews during the occupation], Points Seuil, Paris, 1997.
- Beate Klarsfeld, Serge Klarsfeld, (ed.), Le mémorial de la déportation des juifs de France, [Memorial to the deportation of the Jews of France], Paris, 1978.
- Serge Klarsfeld, Vichy-Auschwitz, la « solution finale » de la question juive en France, [Vichy-Auschwitz, the "final solution" of the Jewish question in France], Fayard, Paris, 3rd ed. 2001.
- Florent Le bot, La fabrique réactionnaire. Antisémitisme, spoliations et corporatisme dans le cuir, 1930-1950, [Reactionary factories. Antisemitism, plunder and corporatism in leather manufacturing], Presses de Sciences Po, Paris, 2007.
- Jean Laloum, Les Juifs dans la banlieue parisienne des années 20 aux années 50, [Jews of the Parisian banlieue in the 1920s to 1950s], CNRS éditions, Paris, 1998.
- Marrus, Michael R; Paxton, Robert O (1995) [1981]. Vichy France and the Jews. Stanford University Press. ISBN 978-0-8047-2499-9. OCLC 848753155.
- Paxton, Robert O (2001) [1972]. Vichy France: Old Guard and New Order 1940-1944. Columbia University Press. ISBN 978-0-231-12469-0. OCLC 47825026.
- Renée Poznanski, Les Juifs en France pendant la Seconde Guerre mondiale, [Jews in France during the second world war], Hachette, Paris, 1997; 1st ed. 1994.
- Simon Schwarzfuchs, Aux prises avec Vichy, Histoire politique des Juifs de France, 1940-1944 [Coping with Vichy, political history of French Jewry, 1940-1944], éditions Calmann-Lévy, Paris, 1998.
- Philippe Verheyde, Les mauvais comptes de Vichy. L’aryanisation des entreprises juives, [Vichy's bad accounts. The aryanization of Jewish businesses], Perrin, Paris, 1999.
- Richard H. Weisberg, Vichy, la justice et les juifs, éd. des archives contemporaines, Amsterdam, 1998; 1st ed. New York, 1996.

== See also ==
- Timeline of deportations of French Jews to death camps
- Union générale des israélites de France
