= Green ticket roundup =

Mass arrest of Jews in Paris in 1941

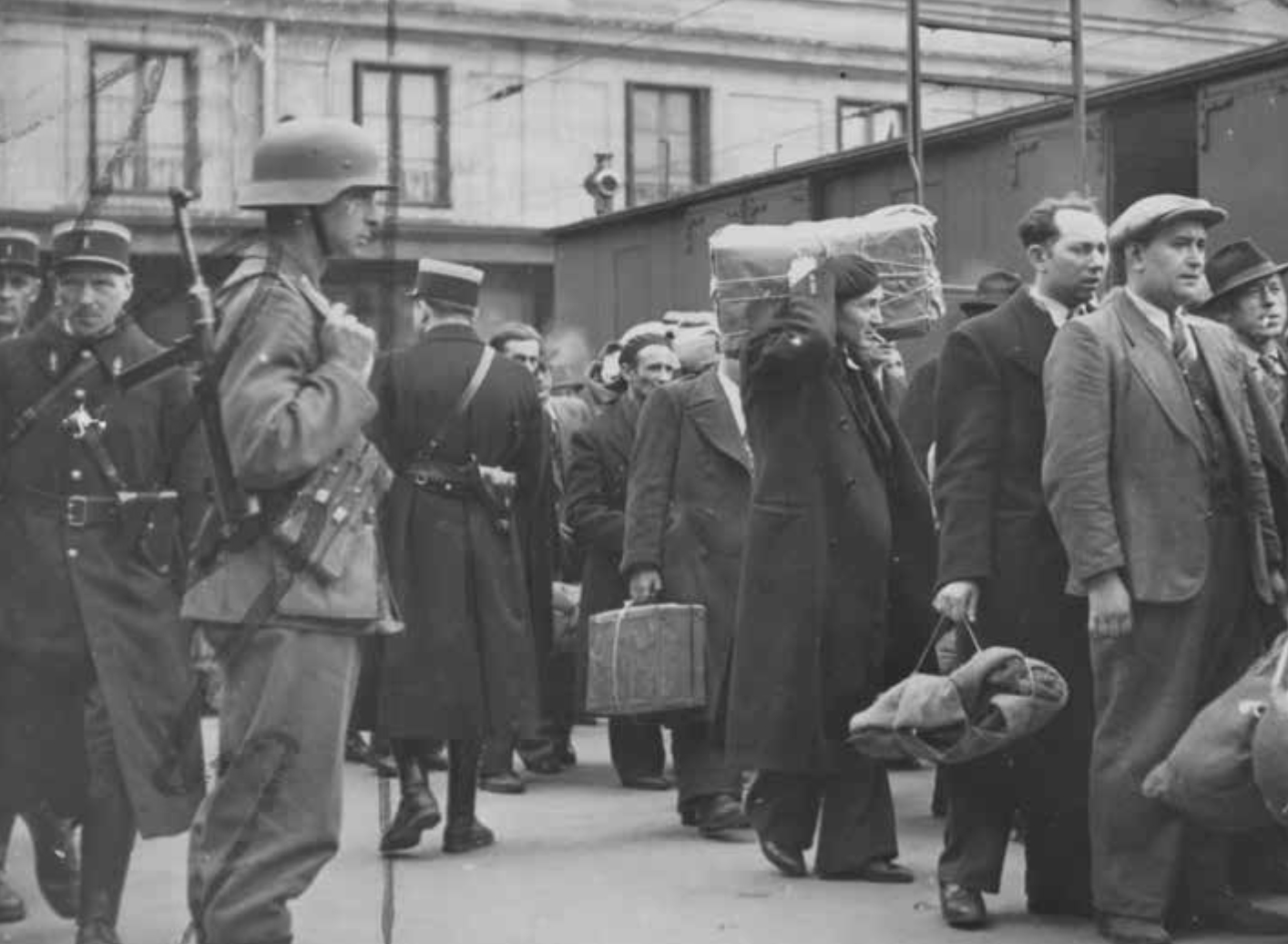
- The roundup taking place on 14 May 1941
- Native name: Rafle du billet vert
- English name: Green ticket roundup
- Date: 14 May 1941
- Location: Paris
- Target: Foreign jews living in France
- Organised by: Nazi Germany, Vichy France
- Participants: French Police and Gendarmerie
- Arrests: 3,747

The green ticket roundup (French: rafle du billet vert ), also known as the green card roundup, (Note: This event is called la rafle du billet vert in French. Scholarship in English has tended to use one of three terms for this topic: either green ticket roundup, green card roundup, or the original French term la rafle du billet vert to discuss the event. Green is part of the name in all sources, which report that the summons that was sent to foreign Jewish residents of the Paris region was printed on green paper or green card stock. The word billet can be translated in various ways, in this context, usually "ticket" or "card".) took place on 14 May 1941 during the Nazi occupation of France. The mass arrest started a day after French Police delivered a green card (billet vert) to 6,694 foreign Jews living in Paris, instructing them to report for a "status check" (examen de situation, lit. 'examination of situation').

Over half reported as instructed, most of them Polish and Czech. They were arrested and deported to one of two transit camps in France. Most of them were interned for a year before getting deported to Auschwitz and murdered. The "green ticket roundup" was the first mass arrest of Jews by the Vichy regime during World War II; it was followed just over a year later by the Vel' d'Hiv roundup when over 13,000 Jews were deported and murdered. (Note: The event is known as a "roundup" both in French (rafle) and in English, although the term roundup is not strictly accurate, since the victims responded to a summons. However, it has become the conventional term to use for this event, because it was the first of a wave of massive arrests of Jews under the Vichy regime, of which the remaining ones were mostly roundups. In particular, it occurred before the larger Vel' d'Hiv roundup of July 1942.)

== Background ==
France fell in World War II to the German invasion which began in May 1940 and ended with the occupation of Paris on 14 June and capitulation to Germany eight days later. France was occupied by Nazi Germany and divided in two, with the north and west (including Paris) belonging to the Occupied zone administered directly by Germany, and the rest to the so-called Zone libre ("Free zone") in the south and east. The French government under Marshall Philippe Pétain moved to the town of Vichy in the Zone libre. On 10 July parliament dissolved itself, ending the Third Republic and creating the "French State" (État français; more commonly known as the "Vichy regime") in its place with Petain holding supreme power.

Starting in 1940, the Vichy government adopted laws that excluded Jews and their children from certain roles in society. These laws were passed without coercion from the Germans. According to Marshal Philippe Pétain's chief of staff, "Germany was not at the origin of the anti-Jewish legislation of Vichy, that legislation was spontaneous and autonomous". On 22 July 1940, Vichy set up a special commission to examine and revoke the citizenship of Jews who had been naturalised after the 1927 reform of the nationality law, with the aim of removing "foreigners" from French society. (Note: Between June 1940 and August 1944, 15,000 persons, mostly Jews, were denaturalised. This bureaucratic decision was instrumental in their subsequent internment.) Roughly three hundred thousand Jews lived in France, of whom nearly half were foreign Jews who had fled since World War I from Eastern Europe and, more recently, from Nazi Germany. In September 1940, the French authorities, by order of the Germans, performed a census of foreign Jews. On 3 September 1940 it became legal to arrest and imprison all dangerous foreigners for the sake of national security and public order. SS-Hauptsturmführer Theodor Dannecker, representative of Adolf Eichmann in Paris, wished to speed up the exclusion of Jews, not only by registering them and plundering their goods, but also by interning them. He counted on Karl Theo Zeitschel at the German embassy in Paris, who shared the same objectives, and who was in charge of relations with the Commissariat-General for Jewish Affairs, which was created on 29 March 1941.

=== Prelude ===
On 4 October, the Vichy regime promulgated a new law on the status of Jews. It became legal for local authorities to arrest foreign Jews and inter them in special camps. Rudolf Schleier, the German Consul General in Paris, wrote in a report to Berlin that "The French government has undertaken to send all foreign-born Jews to concentration camps in the Unoccupied Zone," and continued that "Jews will be arrested in the Occupied Zone the moment the necessary camps are ready."

By 1941, the camps at Pithiviers, Beaune-la-Roland, Compiegne, and Drancy were in operation, chiefly for the purpose of interning foreign Jews from Paris. On 22 April 1941, Dannecker informed prefect Jean-Pierre Ingrand, representative of the Ministry of the Interior in the Occupied zone, of the transformation of the German camp for French prisoners of war of Pithiviers into an internment camp for Parisian Jews, with the transfer of its management to the office of the Loiret prefect. At the same time, the Germans insisted on the implementation of the law of 4 October 1940 which allowed the internment of foreign Jews. The camp at Pithiviers being insufficient for the purpose on its own, the Beaune-la-Rolande internment camp was added for a maximum total capacity of 5,000 detainees.

== Operations ==
=== Summons ===
At the beginning of May 1941, on the basis of the previous year census, 6694 foreign Jews, mostly Polish males between 18 and 60 years old living in the Paris region, received a summons on a green card (the French: billet vert, lit. 'green card') hand-delivered by a French policeman for a "status review" (French: examen de situation, lit. 'examination of situation') on the order of Dr. Werner Best. The green cards ordered them to go to one of five centres (Caserne Napoléon, Caserne des Minimes, Rue Edouard-Pailleron, rue de la Grange aux Belles or gymnase Japy) on 14 May 1941, accompanied by a relative or a friend.

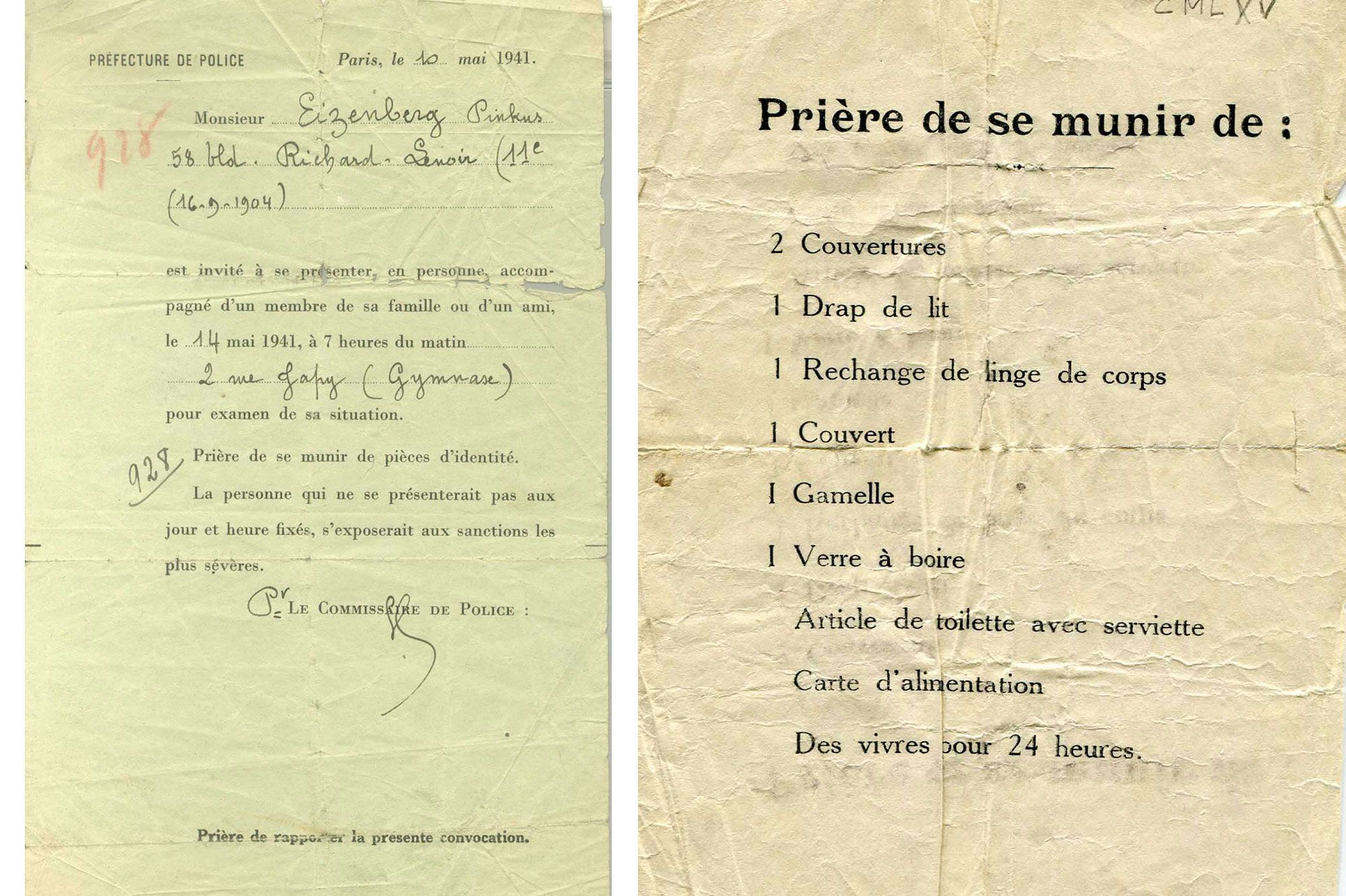
One of the green cards received (on the left) and a list of items that the relative had to bring back.

The card read:

Mr. _______ is invited to present himself in person, accompanied by one member of his family or by one friend, at 7:00 in the morning on May 14, 1941, for an examination of his situation. He is asked to provide identification. Those who do not present themselves on the set day and hour are liable for the most severe sanctions.

=== Arrests and internment ===
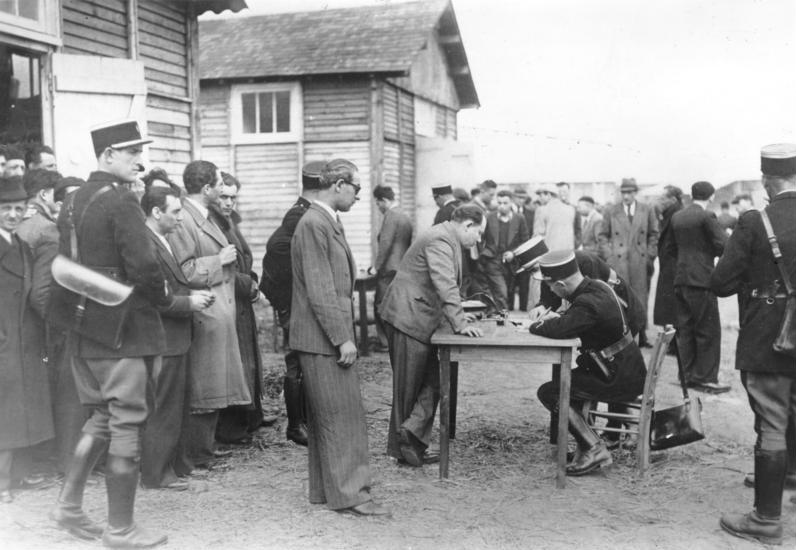
Victims of the roundup registered on arrival by French gendarmes at the Pithiviers internment camp

Assuming that it was only an administrative formality, 3,700 men obeyed the summons (3,430 Polish, 157 Czech and 123 stateless Jews). They were immediately arrested, while the person accompanying them was given a list of items to go fetch for them (blanket and sheet, clothing, cutlery, plate, toiletry bag, food card and enough food for 24 hours). The prisoners were transferred by bus to the Gare d'Austerlitz and deported the same day by four special trains to two transit and internment camps in the Loiret: 1,700 to Pithiviers and 2,000 to Beaune-la-Rolande. Both camps were at first operated by French gendarmes under the administrative supervision of the Loiret prefect, the French Red Cross (Croix-Rouge Française) brought aid to the families of those interned in both camps.

The inmates at Beaune-la-Rolande stayed in the Château d'Eau barracks. The camp was located in the Southern Zone, 89 kilometers (55 miles) south of Paris. The camp had two sections: one for the internees, and the other reserved for administrative services (police station, infirmary, administration, and kitchen). It was a French-run transit and internment camp and deportation centre for Jews closely associated with the camp at Pithiviers. For more than a year the prisoners were held without knowing what would happen to them. While in Beaune-la-Rolande, prisoners performed forced labor both inside and outside the camp, although 700 managed to escape. The German authorities took over operations at Beaune-la-Rolande in May 1942.

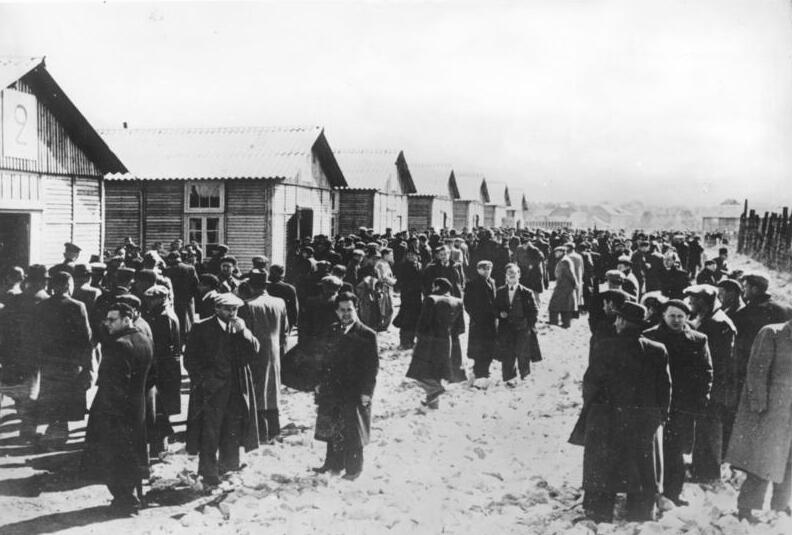
Jewish prisoners in front of their barracks at the Pithiviers camp

The camp at Pithiviers consisted of 19 barracks. While under de jure French authority, the Schutzstaffel exercised supervisory control and inspection. Just like in Beaune-la-Rolande, prisoners performed forced labor both inside and outside the camp. Some prisoners refused to participate in forced labor and organized a revolt in June 1941; a few managed to escape. The camp authorities responded by banning mail and sending some men to prison. The camp's head doctor, a French doctor from the town, was removed by the SS after they found him to be sympathetic to the prisoners' plight, under orders from Dannecker, the Germans took over operations at Pithiviers in May 1942. (Note: Prisoners' diaries and ITS records indicate that German control of Pithiviers began as early as 8 May of that year.)

=== Deportation and deaths ===
On 8 May 1942, 289 Jewish prisoners were transferred to the Frontstalag of Royallieu, in Compiègne, where they left in rail cattle cars on 5 June on Convoy 2 for Auschwitz concentration camp. On 25 June and 17 July 1942 the remaining prisoners were sent on Convoy 4 and Convoy 6 from the Pithiviers station, and on 28 June on Convoy 5 from the Beaune-la-Rolande station, to Auschwitz where they were murdered.

== Aftermath ==
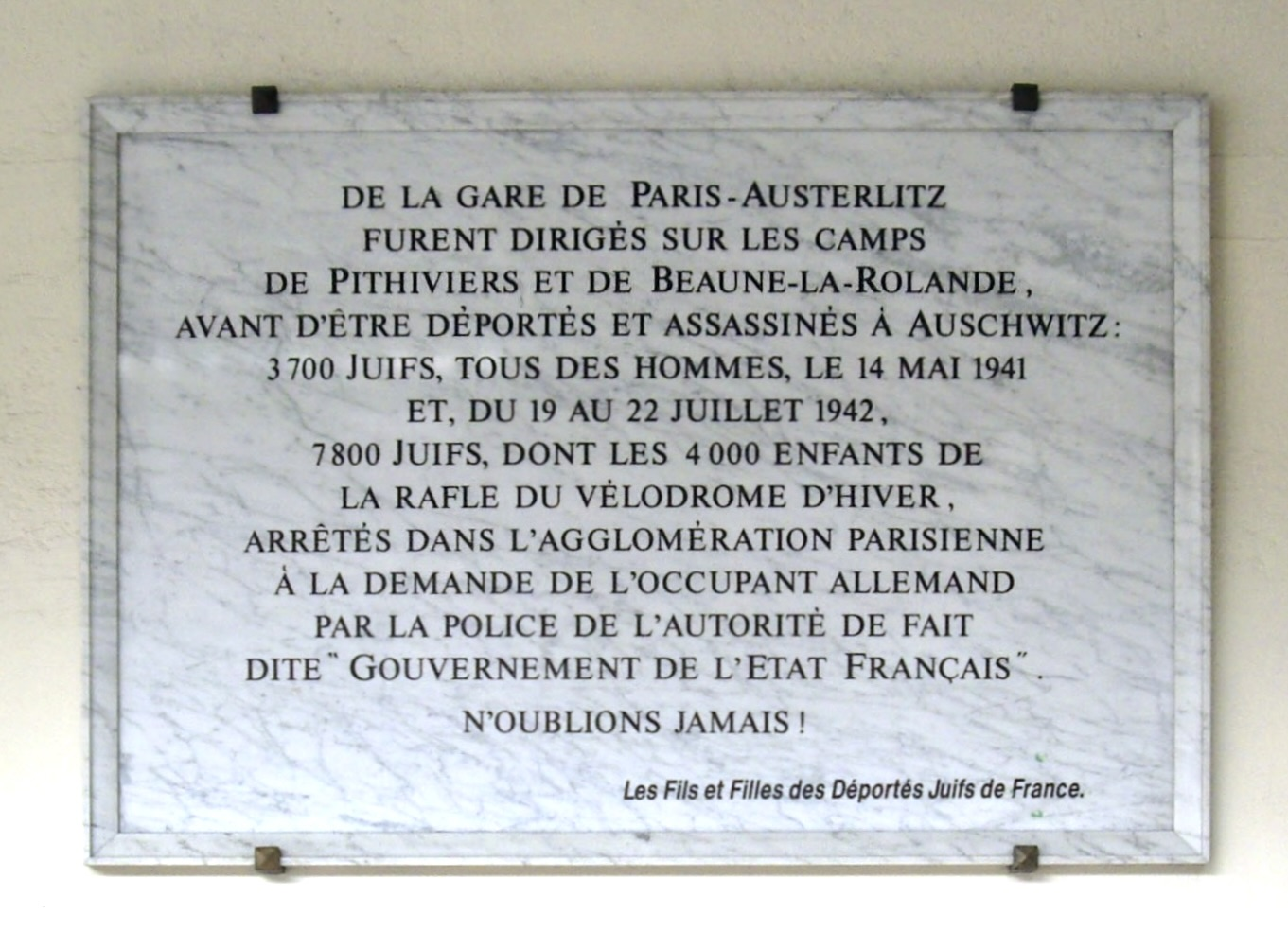
Memorial plate to the victims of the green ticket and the Vel d'hiv roundups at Gare d'Austerlitz

The green ticket roundup was the first mass round-up of Jewish people by the Vichy Regime, it was followed a year later with the deportation and murder of more than 13,000 Jewish people during the Vel' d'Hiv Roundup.

== Discovery of photographs ==
In the early 2010s, 200 contact sheets taken in occupied Paris surfaced at a fair in Reims. Five of the sheets, a hundred or so images, concern the green ticket roundup and the life of deportees in the Beaune-la-Rolande and Pithiviers camps. A Norman flea-market merchant bought them and forgot them until he watched a documentary on the Second World War. He contacted collectors, who eventually donated them to the Mémorial de la Shoah. The photographer may have been Harry Croner, a member of the Wehrmacht Propaganda Troops who accompanied Theodor Dannecker and other German officials present during these opérations. Some of the photos were published in the collaborationist press, and later figured in archives or works of history, but without photographer credit. One photo is famous for having appeared in Nuit et Brouillard (1956) by Alain Resnais. While it was once believed to have been taken at Pithiviers, it is now known to depict Beaune-la-Rolande.

== See also ==
- Maurice Papon
- History of the Jews in France
- Internment camps in France
- The Holocaust in France
- Vichy Holocaust collaboration timeline
