= Timeline of deportations of French Jews to death camps =

Part of the Holocaust

This is a timeline of deportations of French Jews to Nazi extermination camps in German-occupied Europe during World War II. The overall total of Jews deported from France is a minimum of 75,721.

Date of departure	Convoy #	Place of departure	Destination	Number of deportees	Number gassed upon arrival	Male	Female	Male	Female
Date of departure	Convoy #	Place of departure	Destination	Number of deportees	Number gassed upon arrival	Selected to work at Auschwitz		Surviving in 1945	
March 27, 1942	1	Drancy/Compiègne	Auschwitz	1,112		1,112	0	22	0
June 5, 1942	2	Compiègne	Auschwitz	1,000		1,000	0	41	0
June 22, 1942	3	Drancy	Auschwitz	1,000		933	66	29	5
June 25, 1942	4	Pithiviers	Auschwitz	999		1,000	0	59	0
June 28, 1942	5	Beaune-la-Rolande	Auschwitz	1,038		1,004	34	55	
July 17, 1942	6	Pithiviers	Auschwitz	928		809	119	45	
July 19, 1942	7	Drancy	Auschwitz	999	375	504	121	17	
July 20, 1942	8	Angers	Auschwitz	827	23	411	390	19	
July 22, 1942	9	Drancy	Auschwitz	996		615	385	7	
July 24, 1942	10	Drancy	Auschwitz	1,000		370	630	5	
July 27, 1942	11	Drancy	Auschwitz	1,000		248	742	12	1
July 29, 1942	12	Drancy	Auschwitz	1,001	216	270	514	5	
July 31, 1942	13	Pithiviers	Auschwitz	1,049		693	359	15	1
August 3, 1942	14	Pithiviers	Auschwitz	1,034	482	22	542	3	3
August 5, 1942	15	Beaune-la-Rolande	Auschwitz	1,014	704	214	96	5	1
August 7, 1942	16	Pithiviers	Auschwitz	1,069	794	63	211	5	2
August 10, 1942	17	Drancy	Auschwitz	1,006	766	140	100	1	
August 12, 1942	18	Drancy	Auschwitz	1,007	705	233	62	11	
August 14, 1942	19	Drancy	Auschwitz	991	875	115		1	
August 17, 1942	20	Drancy	Auschwitz	1,000	878	65	34	3	
August 19, 1942	21	Drancy	Auschwitz	1,000	817	138	45	5	
August 21, 1942	22	Drancy	Auschwitz	1,000	892	90	18	7	
August 24, 1942	23	Drancy	Auschwitz	1,000	908	92		3	
August 26, 1942	24	Drancy	Auschwitz	1,002	937^{[a]}	27	36	24	
August 28, 1942	25	Drancy	Auschwitz	1,000	929^{[a]}		71	8	
August 31, 1942	26	Drancy	Auschwitz	1,000	961^{[a]}	12	27	16	1
September 2, 1942	27	Drancy	Auschwitz	1,000	877^{[a]}	10	113	30	
September 4, 1942	28	Drancy	Auschwitz	1,013	959^{[a]}	16	38	25	2
September 7, 1942	29	Drancy	Auschwitz	1,000	889^{[a]}	59	52	34	
September 9, 1942	30	Drancy	Auschwitz	1,000	909^{[a]}	23	68	43	
September 11, 1942	31	Drancy	Auschwitz	1,000	920^{[a]}	2	78	13	
September 14, 1942	32	Drancy	Auschwitz	1,000	893^{[a]}	58	49	45	
September 16, 1942	33	Drancy	Auschwitz	1,003	856^{[a]}		147	37	1
September 18, 1942	34	Drancy	Auschwitz	1,000	859^{[a]}	31	110	22	
September 21, 1942	35	Pithiviers	Auschwitz	1,000	791^{[a]}	65	144	29	
September 23, 1942	36	Drancy	Auschwitz	1,000	475	399	126	22	4
September 25, 1942	37	Drancy	Auschwitz	1,004	873^{[a]}	40	91	15	
September 28, 1942	38	Drancy	Auschwitz	904	733^{[a]}	123	48	20	
September 30, 1942	39	Drancy	Auschwitz	210	154	34	22	0	
November 4, 1942	40 (41)	Drancy	Auschwitz	1,000	639	269	92	4	
November 6, 1942	42	Drancy	Auschwitz	1,000	773	145	82	4	
November 9, 1942	44	Drancy	Auschwitz	1,000	900^{[a]}		100	16	
November 11, 1942	(43) 45	Drancy	Auschwitz	745	599	112	34	2	
February 9, 1943	46	Drancy	Auschwitz	1,000	816	77	92	15	7
February 11, 1943	47	Drancy	Auschwitz	998	802	143	53	13	1
February 13, 1943	48	Drancy	Auschwitz	1,000	689	144	165	16	1
March 2, 1943	49	Drancy	Auschwitz	1,000	881	100	19	4	2
March 4, 1943	50	Drancy	Majdanek/Sobibor	1,003	950 min.	?	?	3	
March 6, 1943	51	Drancy	Majdanek/Sobibor	998	950 min.	?	?	5	
March 23, 1943	52	Drancy	Sobibor	994	950 min.	?	?	0	
March 25, 1943	53	Drancy	Sobibor	1,008	970	15		5	
June 23, 1943	55	Drancy	Auschwitz	1,018	518	383	217	42	44
July 18, 1943	57	Drancy	Auschwitz	1,000	440	369	191	30	22
July 31, 1943	58	Drancy	Auschwitz	1,000	727	218	55	16	28
September 2, 1943	59	Drancy	Auschwitz	1,000	662	232	106	17	4
October 7, 1943	60	Drancy	Auschwitz	1,000	491	340	169	35	4
October 28, 1943	61	Drancy	Auschwitz	1,000	613	284	103	39	3
November 20, 1943	62	Drancy	Auschwitz	1,200	914	241	45	27	2
December 7, 1943	64^{[b]}	Drancy	Auschwitz	1,000	661	267	72	48	2
December 17, 1943	63^{[b]}	Drancy	Auschwitz	850	505	233	112	25	6
January 20, 1944	66	Drancy	Auschwitz	1,155	864	236	55	42	30
February 3, 1944	67	Drancy	Auschwitz	1,214	985	166	49	20	23
February 10, 1944	68	Drancy	Auschwitz	1,500	1,229	210	61	27	32
March 7, 1944	69	Drancy	Auschwitz	1,501	1,311	110	80	20	14
March 27, 1944	70	Drancy	Auschwitz	1,000	480	380	100	79	73
April 13, 1944	71	Drancy	Auschwitz	1,500	1,265 max.	165 min.	91	39	91
April 29, 1944	72	Drancy	Auschwitz	1,004	904	48	52	12	38
May 15, 1944	73	Drancy	Kaunas/Reval	878				17	
May 20, 1944	74	Drancy	Auschwitz	1,200	904 max.	188 min.	117	49	117
May 30, 1944	75	Drancy	Auschwitz	1,000	627	239	134	35	64
June 30, 1944	76	Drancy	Auschwitz	1,100	479	398	223	67	115
July 31, 1944	77	Drancy	Auschwitz	1,300	726	291	283	68	146
August 11, 1944		Lyon	Auschwitz	430	128 min.	117	63	17	19
August 17, 1944		Drancy	Buchenwald	51				31	4
Total				73,853^{[c]}	46,802	17,160	8,703	1,647	913

== See also ==
- The Holocaust in France
- Camp du Récébédou
- Drancy internment camp
- Jewish ghettos in German-occupied Poland
- Timeline of Treblinka
- Vichy Holocaust collaboration timeline

== Notes ==
- ^{a} From August 26 to November 9, 1942, 15 convoys from France and a few from Belgium underwent a selection for a work detail at Kosel before arrival at Auschwitz; about 3,000 healthy men were taken, of whom about 2,000 were still alive on April 1, 1944, the day they were registered at Auschwitz. Only 377 were still alive in 1945, constituting the largest group of survivors from those deported in 1942, not including 256 survivors from the first six convoys, which arrived in Auschwitz before gas chambers operations were begun in July 1942.
- ^{b} The numbers of the convoys of December 7 and 17, 1943 were inverted by the Gestapo; we have maintained that order.
- ^{c} In addition to the 73,853 total, the following are added:

- Jews deported to Auschwitz from Nord and Pas-de-Calais (in France) through Belgium (about 1,000)
- Jews married to prisoners of war and deported to Bergen-Belsen with their children (257)
- Jews deported from Noé, Saint-Sulpice-la-Pointe, and Toulouse to Buchenwald on July 30, 1944 (at least 350)
- Jews deported to Auschwitz from Clermont-Ferrand on August 22, 1944 (at least 68)
- Jews deported to Auschwitz in convoys of "aryans" on July 8, 1942 and April 30, 1944 (at least 100)
- Jews deported individually (at least 100)
- Jews deported in resistance convoys (unknown)

The overall total of Jews deported from France is a minimum of 75,721.
