= The Holocaust in France =

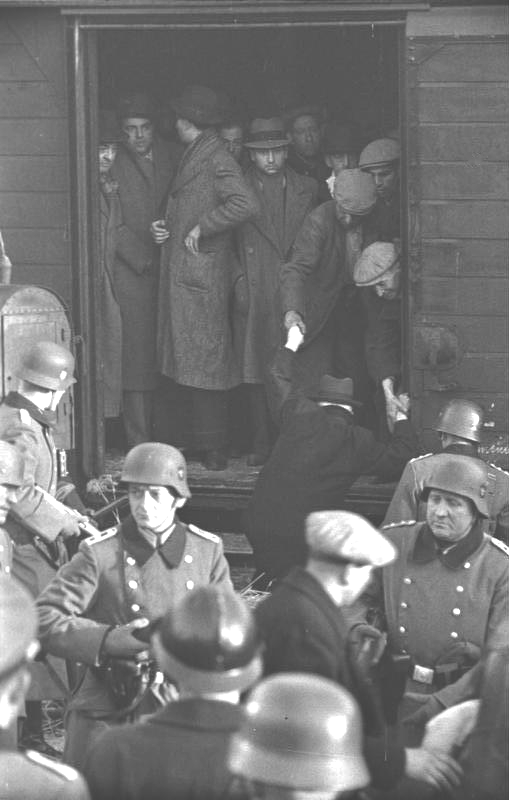
Deportation of Jews during the Marseille roundup, 23 January 1943

The Holocaust in France was the persecution, deportation, and annihilation of Jews between 1940 and 1944 in occupied France, metropolitan Vichy France, and in Vichy-controlled French North Africa, during World War II. The persecution began in 1940, and culminated in deportations of Jews from France to Nazi concentration camps in Nazi Germany and Nazi-occupied Poland. The deportations started in 1942 and lasted until July 1944. In 1940, 340,000 Jews, about two-thirds French citizens and one-third refugees from Nazi Germany, were living in continental France. More than 75,000 Jews were deported to death camps, where about 72,500 were killed.

Most of these Jews were foreigners: 25 000 from Poland, 7,000 from Germany, 4,000 from the Soviet Union, 3,000 from Romania, 3,000 from Austria, 1,500 from Greece, 1,500 from Turkey, 1,200 from Hungary. French Jews numbered around 24,000 (6,500 French Jews from Metropole, 1,500 from Algeria, 8,000 children of foreign parents, 8,000 Jews naturalized).

Antisemitism was prevalent throughout Europe at the time. As in other German-occupied and aligned states, the Nazis in France relied to a considerable extent on the co-operation of local authorities to carry out what they called the Final Solution. The government of Vichy France and the French police organized and implemented the roundups of Jews. Although the vast majority of the deported Jews were killed, the overall survival rate of the Jewish population in France was up to 75%, which is one of the highest survival rates in Europe.

== Background ==
In May 1940, the Wehrmacht invaded the Netherlands, Belgium and Luxembourg and won the Battle of France in June. There was a German military administration in occupied France until the Wehrmacht had to withdraw after the Battle of Normandy. In 1940, around 700,000 Jews lived in French-ruled territory, of which 400,000 lived in French Algeria, then an integral part of France, and in the French protectorates of Tunisia and Morocco. On the eve of World War II, Metropolitan France had a population of over 300,000 Jews, around 200,000 of whom lived in Paris. France also hosted a large population of foreign Jews who had fled persecution in Nazi Germany. By 1939, the Jewish population had increased to 330,000 due in part to the refusal of the United States and the United Kingdom to accept any more Jewish refugees following the Évian Conference. During the German occupation of the Netherlands and of Belgium in May 1940, Metropolitan France received a new wave of Jewish immigrants and its Jewish population peaked at 340,000 individuals.

When World War II was declared, French Jews were mobilized into the French military like all their compatriots, and as in 1914, a significant number of foreign Jews enlisted in regiments of foreign volunteers. Jewish refugees from Germany were interned as enemy aliens together with other German citizens. In general, the Jewish population of France was confident in the ability of France to defend them against the occupiers, but some, particularly from Alsace and the Moselle regions, fled westwards into the unoccupied zone from July 1940.

The armistice of 22 June 1940, signed between the Third Reich and the government of Marshal Philippe Pétain, did not contain any overtly anti-Jewish clauses, but it did indicate that the Hitler regime intended the race laws existing in Germany since autumn 1935 to spread to Metropolitan France and its overseas territories:

- Article 3 warned that in the regions of France occupied directly by the Germans, the French administration must "by all means facilitate the regulations" relating to the exercise of the rights of the Reich;
- Articles 16 and 19 warned that the French government had to proceed to repatriate refugees from the occupied territory and that "The French government is required to deliver on demand all German nationals designated by the Reich and who are in France, in French possessions, colonies, protectorates and territories under mandate."

Under the terms of the armistice, only part of Metropolitan France was occupied by Germany. From the city of Vichy, the government of Philippe Pétain nominally ruled France under the new French State (État français), but only governed the southern part of Metropolitan France, the three departments of French Algeria, and France's other overseas territories. Nazi Germany and the Vichy regime saw the French colonial empire as an integral part of non-occupied Vichy France, and its anti-Jewish decrees were immediately implemented there, because of the Vichy vision of the empire as a territorial continuation of Metropolitan France.

== History ==
=== Conditions of armistice ===
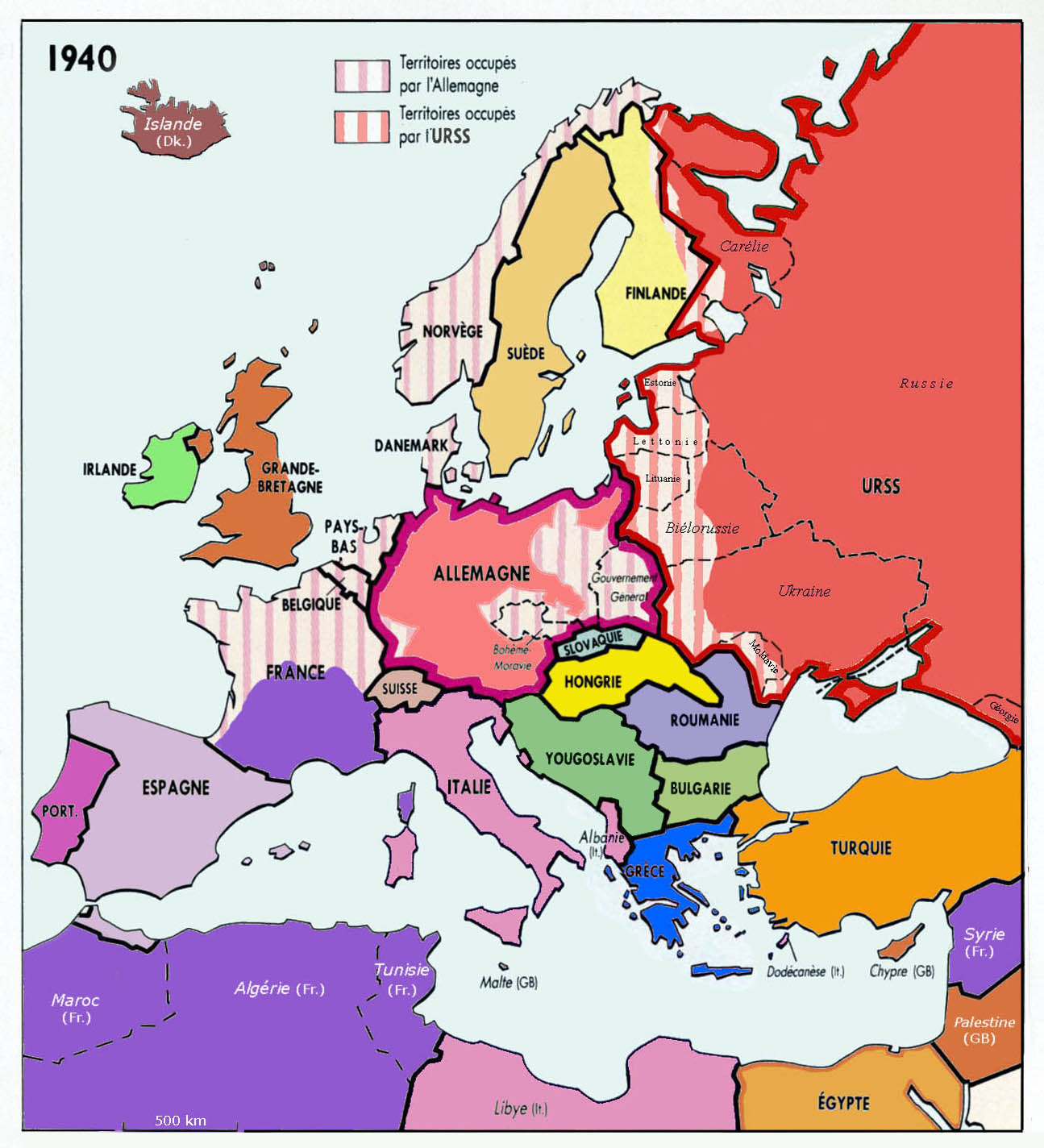
The map clearly shows the division of France as per all the historical realities of the era: Nazi Germany annexed Alsace Lorraine, and occupied northern metropolitan France and all the Atlantic coastline down to the border with Spain. That left the rest of France, including the remaining two-fifths of southern and eastern metropolitan France and Overseas France North Africa, unoccupied, and under the control of a collaborationist French government based at the city of Vichy, and headed by Marshal Philippe Pétain.

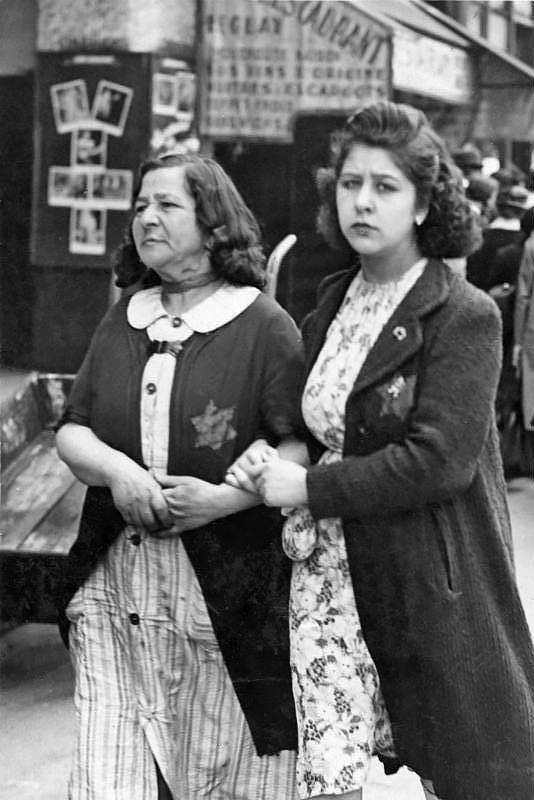
Two Jewish women in occupied Paris wearing yellow badges in June 1942, a few weeks before the mass arrest

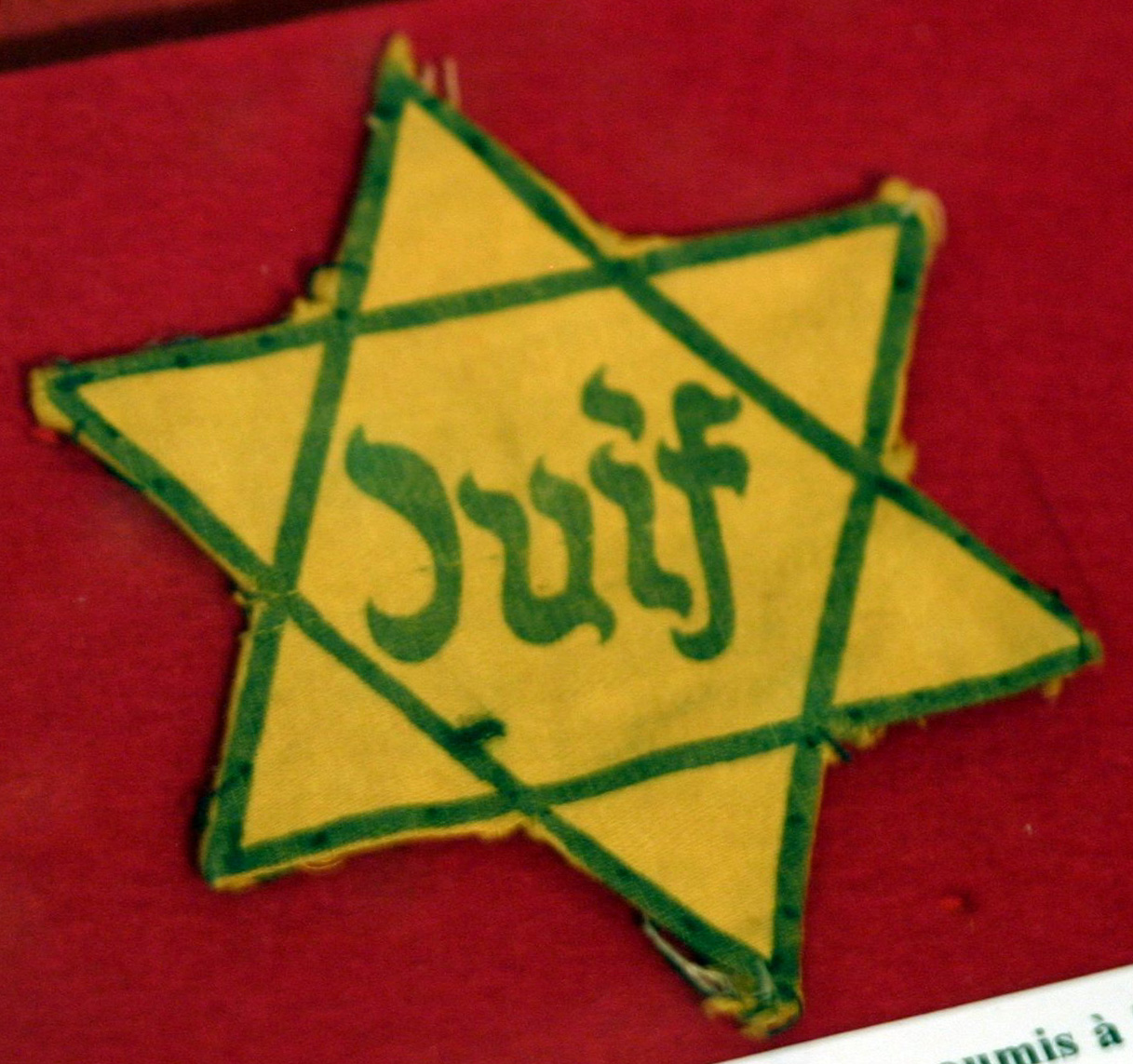
Yellow badge made mandatory by the Nazis in France

From the summer of 1940, Otto Abetz, the German ambassador in Paris, organized the expropriation of rich Jewish families. The Vichy regime took the first anti-Jewish measures slightly after the German authorities in the autumn of 1940. On 3 October 1940, Vichy passed the Law on the status of Jews to define who was a Jew, and to issue a list of occupations prohibited to Jews. Article 9 of the law stated that it applied to France's possessions of French Algeria, the colonies, the Protectorates of Tunisia and Morocco, and mandates territories. The October 1940 law was prepared by Raphaël Alibert. A 2010 document makes it clear that Pétain personally made the law even more aggressively antisemitic than it initially was, as can be seen by annotations made on the draft in his own hand. The law "embraced the definition of a Jew established in the Nuremberg Laws", deprived the Jews of their civil rights, and fired them from many jobs. The law also forbade Jews from working in certain professions (teachers, journalists, lawyers, etc.) while the law of 4 October 1940 provided authority for the incarceration of foreign Jews in internment camps in southern France such as Gurs. These internees were joined by convoys of Jews deported from regions of France, including 6,500 Jews who had been deported from southwestern Germany during Operation Bürckel in October 1940.

During Operation Bürckel, Josef Bürckel and Robert Heinrich Wagner, the Gauleiter of Gau Westmark and Gau Baden, respectively, oversaw the expulsion of Jews from their Gaue into unoccupied France. Only those Jews in mixed marriages were not expelled. The 6,500 Jews affected by Operation Bürckel were given, at most, two hours warning on the night of 22–23 October 1940, before being rounded up. The nine trains carrying the deported Jews crossed over into France "without any warning to the French authorities", who were not happy with receiving them. The deportees had not been allowed to take any of their possessions with them, these being confiscated by German authorities. The German Foreign Minister Joachim von Ribbentrop treated the ensuing complaints by the Vichy government over the expulsions in a "most dilatory fashion". In revenge, the German Jews expelled in Operation Bürckel were interned in harsh conditions by the Vichy authorities at camps in Gurs, in Rivesaltes and in Les Milles while the Vichy government waited for the chance to return them to Germany.

The General Commissariat for Jewish Affairs, created by the Vichy State in March 1941, supervised the seizure of Jewish assets and organized anti-Jewish propaganda. At the same time, German occupiers began compiling registers of Jews in the occupied zone. The Second Statut des Juifs of 2 June 1941 systematized this registration across the country and in Vichy-North Africa. Because the yellow star-of-David badge was not made compulsory in the unoccupied zone, these records would provide the basis for future roundups and deportations. In the occupied zone, a German order enforced the wearing of the yellow star for all Jews who were six years old and over on 29 May 1942.

On 2 October 1941, seven synagogues were bombed in Paris. Still, the vast majority of synagogues remained opened during the whole war in the Zone libre. The Vichy government even protected them after attacks as a way to deny persecution. In Alsace-Lorraine, many synagogues were destroyed or converted.

In order to more closely control the Jewish community, on 29 November 1941, the Germans created the Union générale des israélites de France (UGIF) under which all Jewish charitable works were subsumed. German occupiers were thus able to learn where the local Jews lived. Many of the leaders of the UGIF was also deported, such as Raymond-Raoul Lambert and André Baur.

=== Drancy camp ===
The arrests of Jews in France began in 1940 for individuals, and general roundups began in 1941. The first raid (rafle) took place on 14 May, 1941. The Jews who were arrested, all men and foreigners, were interned in the first transit camps at Pithiviers and Beaune-la-Rolande in the Loiret (3,747 men). The second roundup, between 20 July and 1 August, 1941, led to the arrest of 4,232 French and foreign Jews who were taken to the Drancy internment camp. During this roundup, 13,152 Jews (among them 4,115 children) were arrested by the French police and confined in the Vélodrome d'Hiver without any arrangements made for food, water or sanitary facilities.

Deportations began on 27 March, 1942, when the first convoy left Paris for Auschwitz concentration camp. In the occupied zone, the French police were effectively controlled by German authorities. They carried out the measures ordered by the Germans against Jews, and in 1942, delivered non-French Jews from internment camps to the Germans. They also contributed to sending of tens of thousands from those camps to extermination camps in German-occupied Poland, via Drancy.

At the time, it was announced that the Reich had created a homeland for Jews somewhere in Eastern Europe, to which all of the Jews of Europe would be "resettled", and was portrayed as a utopia. In the spring of 1942, the claim that "resettlement in the East" meant going to the mysterious Jewish homeland in Eastern Europe was widely believed in France, even by most Jews, and though most French people did not believe the supposed homeland was really the paradise that the Nazi regime had promised, few could imagine the truth.

In the unoccupied zone, from August 1942, foreign Jews who had been deported to refugee camps in south-west France, in Gurs, Récébédou, and elsewhere, were again arrested and deported to the occupied zone, from where they were sent to extermination camps in Germany and occupied Poland. On 11 November 1942, Wehrmacht troops and Italian troops occupied Vichy France in an action called Case Anton.

=== From the invasion of Vichy France to 1945 ===
The first large-scale deportations of Jews from the unoccupied part of France (Vichy France) took place in August 1942. On 13 August the Nimes Committee of humanitarian organizations in Vichy sent a telegram to the Jewish Joint Distribution Committee in New York City stating: "3,600 Jews from internment camps sent eastward, exact destination unknown....Mass arrests made in hotels Bompard and Levante, Marseille. 200 women taken to Les Milles for deportation. Mothers have choice of taking with them children over five or leaving them with welfare organizations. Total quota is 10,000, first from camps, then working groups. If quota not attained, then arrests to be made in cities."

Foreign (non-French) Jews who had been interned in refugee camps in south-west France, in Gurs, Récébédou, and elsewhere, were arrested and deported to the occupied zone, from where they were sent to extermination camps in Germany and occupied Poland.

In late summer 1942, Adam Rayski, the editor of the Communist underground newspaper J'accuse, came into contact with a former soldier in the Spanish Republican Army who had fled to France in 1939. The soldier had in turn been deported from the Gurs internment camp to work as a slave laborer on a project run by the Organisation Todt in Poland before escaping back to France. The soldier told Rayski that he learned during his time in Poland that there was a camp located in Silesia named Auschwitz where all of the Jews been sent for "resettlement in the East" were being exterminated. After much doubt and debate with the other journalists of J'accuse, Rayski wrote a cover story on 10 October 1942 edition of J'accuse stating that about 11,000 French Jews had been exterminated at Auschwitz since March 1942.

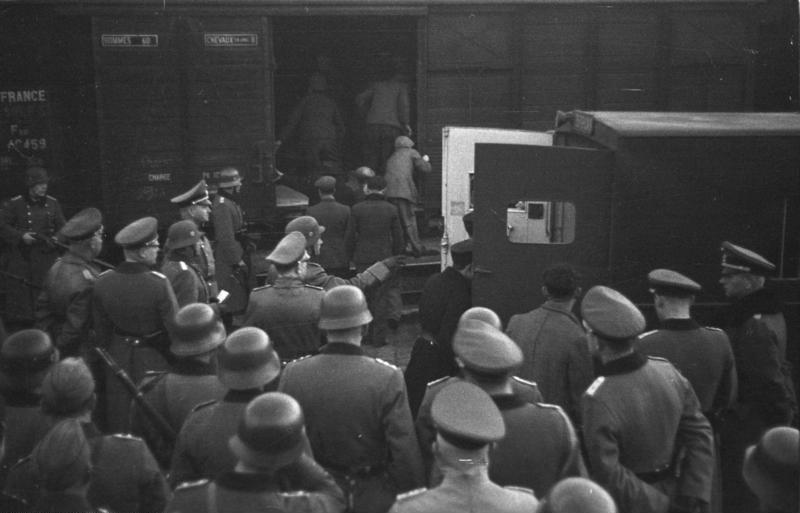
French Jews being deported from Marseille, 1943

In November 1942, the whole of France came under direct German control, apart from a small sector occupied by Italy. In the Italian zone, Jews were generally spared persecution, until the fall of the Fascist regime in Italy led to the establishment of the German-controlled Italian Social Republic in northern Italy in September 1943.

The German authorities took increasingly direct charge of the persecution of Jews, while public opinion forced the Vichy authorities towards a more sensitive approach. However, the Milice, a French paramilitary force inspired by Nazi ideology, was heavily involved in rounding up Jews for deportation during this period. The frequency of German convoys increased. The last, from the camp at Drancy, left Bobigny station on 31 July 1944, just one month before the Liberation of Paris.

In French Algeria, General Henri Giraud and later Charles de Gaulle, the French exile government restored (de jure) French citizenship to Jews on 20 October 1943.

== Rescuing refugees ==
With the onset of World War II, many thousands of refugees from Nazi Germany and German-controlled countries sought refuge in Vichy France, mostly ending up in Marseille or in one of several sordid refugee camps scattered around Vichy. As most European countries were engaged in the war, American humanitarian organizations became prominent in the task of providing aid to refugees until November 1942 when Americans were ordered to leave Vichy. With the departure of the Americans, the work was carried on by French citizens and Europeans from other countries. Active refugee organizations, including the American Friends Service Committee (Quakers), Unitarians, YMCA, Red Cross, Emergency Rescue Committee and seven Jewish organizations, especially HICEM whose funding came mostly from American Jews, were present to aid refugees. Several diplomats, often in violation of the rules of their countries, gave visas to Jewish and other refugees.

By 1942 the refugee organizations realized that Jews were the most endangered group among the diverse nationalities and ethnicities that made up the refugee population of Vichy France. Six thousand children, mostly Jewish, were placed by refugee organizations with French families or in group homes and survived the war. In the years 1940 through 1942, more than 100,000 refugees of all nationalities, religions, and political persuasions were aided to escape Vichy France, either legally with a visa to another country, most commonly the United States, or illegally by crossing the border into Spain or Switzerland.

The people, mostly Protestant Huguenots, of the town of Le Chambon-sur-Lignon in south central France, sheltered an estimated 800 to 1,000 Jewish children on farms during World War II. As many as 5,000 refugees may have been temporarily sheltered in the town as they attempted to escape from France.

== Aftermath ==
About 75,000 Jews were deported to Nazi concentration camps and death camps and 73,500 of them were murdered, but 75% of the approximately 330,000 Jews in metropolitan France in 1939 escaped deportation and survived the Holocaust, which is one of the highest survival rates in Europe. France has the third highest number of citizens who were awarded the Righteous Among the Nations, an award given to "non-Jews who acted according to the most noble principles of humanity by risking their lives to save Jews during the Holocaust".

== Government admission ==
For decades, the French government declined to apologize for the role of the French police in the roundup or for other state complicity. Its argument was that Philippe Pétain dismantled the French Republic when he instituted a new French State during the war and that the Republic had been re-established when the war was over. It was not for the Republic, therefore, to apologise for events that happened while it did not exist and which had been carried out by an illegitimate state which it did not recognise. Former President François Mitterrand, for example, maintained this position. The claim was much more recently reiterated during the 2017 presidential election campaign by Marine Le Pen, leader of the extreme right National Front Party.

The subject of the "Final Solution" was therefore ignored for decades. The narrative, promoted by de Gaulle starting in 1944, that almost the entire French nation had been united in resisting the occupation with the exception of a few dishonorable traitors made it difficult to acknowledge the role of French civil servants, policemen and gendarmes in the "Final Solution". The first book to mention the subject at any length was Vichy France: Old Guard and New Order, 1940-1944 (1972) by the American historian Robert Paxton, through the focus in his book was Vichy France in general. The first book dedicated entirely to the subject was Vichy France and the Jews (1981), which was co-written by Paxton and the Canadian historian Michael Marrus.

On 16 July 1995, President Jacques Chirac stated that it was time that France faced up to its past and he acknowledged the role that the state had played in the persecution of Jews and other victims of the German occupation. Those responsible for the roundup, according to Chirac, were "4,500 policemen and gendarmes, French, under the authority of their leaders [who] obeyed the demands of the Nazis." Chirac commented in his speech about the Velodrome d'Hiver roundup: "[T]hose black hours soiled our history forever. ... [T]he criminal madness of the occupier was assisted by the French people, by the French State. ... France, that day, committed the irreparable."

To mark the 70th anniversary of the roundup, President François Hollande gave a speech at a monument to the Vel' d'Hiv Roundup on 22 July 2012. The president recognized that this event was a crime committed "in France, by France," and emphasized that the deportations in which French police participated were offenses committed against French values, principles, and ideals. He continued his speech by remarking on French tolerance towards others.

In July 2017, also in commemoration of the victims of the roundup at the Vélodrome d'Hiver, President Emmanuel Macron denounced his country's role in the Holocaust and the historical revisionism that denied France's responsibility for 1942 roundup and subsequent deportation of 13,000 Jews. "It was indeed France that organised this [roundup]", he said, French police collaborating with the Nazis. "Not a single German took part," he added. Neither Chirac nor Hollande had specifically stated that the Vichy government, in power during WWII, actually represented the French State. Macron on the other hand, made it clear that the Government during the War was indeed the French State. "It is convenient to see the Vichy regime as born of nothingness, returned to nothingness. Yes, it's convenient, but it is false. We cannot build pride upon a lie."

Macron did make a subtle reference to Chirac's 1995 apology when he added, "I say it again here. It was indeed France that organized the roundup, the deportation, and thus, for almost all, death."

== See also ==
- Children of Izieu
- Refugee workers in Vichy France
- Tulle massacre
- Vichy Holocaust collaboration timeline
