= De Loys's ape =

Hoax species of mammal

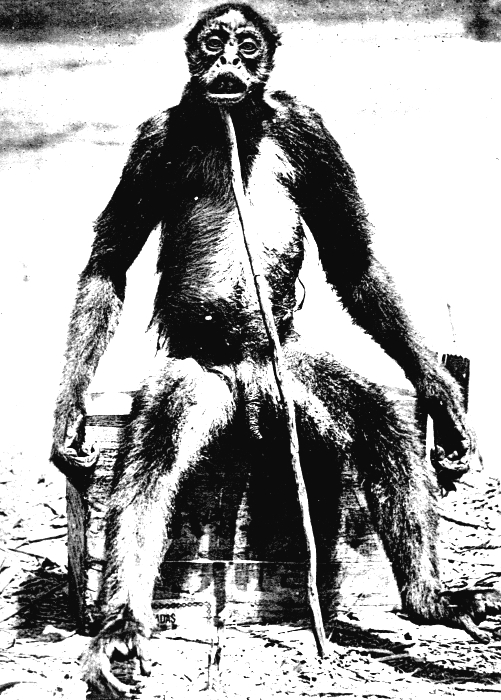
- de Loys's ape, 1920.

Creature information
- Other name: Ameranthropoides loysi
- Sub grouping: Hominid, primate

Origin
- First attested: 1920
- Country: Colombia–Venezuela border
- Region: Tarra River
- Habitat: Rainforest

De Loys's ape, given the proposed scientific name Ameranthropoides loysi, was an alleged large primate reported by Swiss geological explorer François de Loys in South America. The only evidence for the animal besides de Loys's testimony is one photograph. It was promoted by George Montandon as a previously unknown species, but is now considered a misidentification of a spider monkey species or a hoax.

== Encounter ==
Swiss oil geologist de Loys led an expedition from 1917 to 1920 to search for petroleum in an area along the border between Colombia and Venezuela, primarily near Lake Maracaibo. The expedition was unsuccessful. De Loys's group suffered diseases and violent encounters with native populations; only four of the 20 members survived.

According to de Loys's later report, two large creatures approached the group while they were camped on the bank of a tributary of the Tarra River in 1920. Initially, de Loys thought they were bears, but then noted that they were monkey-like. The creatures – one male, one female – seemed angry, said de Loys, and they howled and gestured as they advanced, breaking and grasping branches. They defecated into their hands, and threw feces at de Loys's group. Fearing for their safety, the expedition fired upon the pair, killing the female and wounding the male. De Loys and his companions recognised that they had encountered something unusual. The animal resembled a spider monkey, but was much larger: 1.57 metres (5.2 ft) in height, taller than the largest known spider monkeys, which stand at just over a metre (3.3 ft). De Loys counted 32 teeth (most New World monkeys have 36 teeth), and noted that the creature had no tail.

They posed the creature by seating it on a crate and propping a stick under its chin. De Loys reported that they intended to preserve the animal, but the bones decayed and all but one photograph was lost.

== Publication ==
The story was not reported until 1929, when de Loys's friend George Montandon discovered the photograph while perusing his files for information about South America's native tribes. At Montandon's urging, de Loys related his account in the Illustrated London News of 15 June 1929, and three articles regarding the creature were published in French journals. Montandon suggested the scientific name Ameranthropoides loysi and proposed it as the ancestor of Native Americans, in support of his polygenesis-motivated endorsement of Daniele Rosa's "Hologenesis Hypothesis", which Montandon used to further a then widely discredited idea that different racial groups of Homo sapiens evolved independently from different non-human ape species rather than sharing a common human ancestor. This hypothesis is now denounced as an example of scientific racism, and Montandon, increasingly espousing antisemitic views, would later go on to collaborate with Nazi occupiers during World War II.

== Controversy ==
After this publicity, de Loys's account was deemed unreliable by many prominent critics, including primatologist Philip Hershkovitz and anthropologist Arthur Keith. Keith suggested de Loys was trying to pass off a normal spider monkey as something more exotic. The photograph did not clearly indicate the creature's size, and Keith also noted that by not photographing the creature’s posterior, de Loys had left open the question of whether or not it had a tail. Keith suggested the animal in the photo was simply a spider monkey.

== See also ==
- Mono Grande
