= Institute for the Study of the Jewish Question (disambiguation) =

Institute for the Study of the Jewish Question (German: Institut zum Studium der Judenfrage) was a German institute under Goebbels founded in 1934.

Institute for the Study of the Jewish Question may also refer to:

- Institute for Research on the Jewish Question, (German: Institut zur Erforschung der Judenfrage), a Nazi antisemitic political organization founded in Frankfurt in 1939 under Alfred Rosenberg
- Institute for the Study of Jewish Questions (French: Institut d'étude des questions juives), an antisemitic organization established in France under Nazi rule

== See also ==
- Institute for the Study and Elimination of Jewish Influence on German Church Life
