= Le Juif et la France =

Anti-Semitic propaganda exhibition in German-occupied France

Le Juif et la France (French pronunciation: [lə ʒɥif e la fʁɑ̃s]; Jews and France) was an antisemitic propaganda exhibition that took place in Paris from 5 September 1941 to 15 January 1942 during the German occupation of France in the Second World War. A film version of the exhibition came out in French cinemas in October 1941.

It was organized and financed by the propaganda arm of the German military administration in France via the Institut d'étude des questions juives (IEQJ) (Institute for the Study of Jewish Questions) under regulation by the Gestapo and attracted around half a million visitors. This exhibition was based on the work of Professor George Montandon at the School of Anthropology in Paris, author of the book Comment reconnaître le Juif? (How to recognize a Jew?) published in November 1940. It had pretensions of being "scientific". It was opened by Carltheo Zeitschel and Theodor Dannecker on 5 September 1941 at the Palais Berlitz.

Le Juif et la France was a multi-media exhibition with large panels, photographs, texts, and sculptures. As its focal point, it included a huge sculpture of an old, bearded Jew with exaggerated features, clutching a globe as if intent on world domination. The intent was to portray Jews as a polluting element on French society, intent on financial and political control of France and the world, in control of the media, and responsible for Marxism, Communism, and most of the ills of society. A large sculpture of a female athlete symbolizing France shown defeating two repulsive, old stereotypically Jewish figures dominated the hall; it was named "France Liberating Itself from the Jews."

The exhibition opened two weeks after the second large Paris roundup of Jews The antisemitic propagandist Paul Sézille, general secretary of the IEQJ, wrote the introduction to the catalog:

By presenting the Jew in his various manifestations, by showing by means of irrefutable and carefully chosen documents how deep the Jewish hold on all the activities of France was, by revealing the depth of the evil which was eating away at us, we wish to convince those of our fellow-citizens who are still of sound mind and good judgment, of the urgency of seeing things as they are and then to act accordingly.

— Paul Sezille, catalog of the exhibition Le Juif et la France

The general theme is the supposed corrupt influence of the Jews on French institutions and business activity: the army, the cinema, the economy and literature: "sexual inversion, destruction of our traditions are the favourite themes of Jewish writers". To help visitors get an accurate and concrete idea of "the enemy," photographs and models showed faces that corresponded to antisemitic stereotypes such as hooked noses or dirty hair.

Presented as public service announcements, to "help" the "French to recognize Jews by their physical characteristics", the propaganda initiative took advantage of this exhibition to try to justify various discriminatory measures against French Jews by the Vichy regime. In reality the financial supporters of the exhibition were the Paris office of the German Security Service (Sicherheitsdienst) and the information section of the German Embassy.

Among other things, a spider symbolized "Jewry feasting on the blood of Our France", and as mentioned, a sculpture of a hideous wandering Jew seizing the world in his talons at the feet of "New France" ... Besides that, the exhibition also stigmatized a number of personalities from various professions, and in particular the then-famous furniture merchant Wolff Levitan, radio journalist Jean-Michel Grunebaum, journalist Pierre Lazareff, playwright Henri Bernstein, producer Bernard Natan and politician Léon Blum.

Attendance figures differ according to the source consulted. Some spoke of 155,000 visitors, others claimed 500,000 paid entrants, with as many free and half-off tickets, as claimed by the collaborationist authorities for the Paris region. It seems however, that after some initial success in the first few days based on novelty, interest waned with the suspicion among the French populace of what the occupying force was trying to convey.

== See also ==
- Antisemitism in France
- Paris in World War II
- Occupied France
