= Camp de Noé =

- Internment transit camp
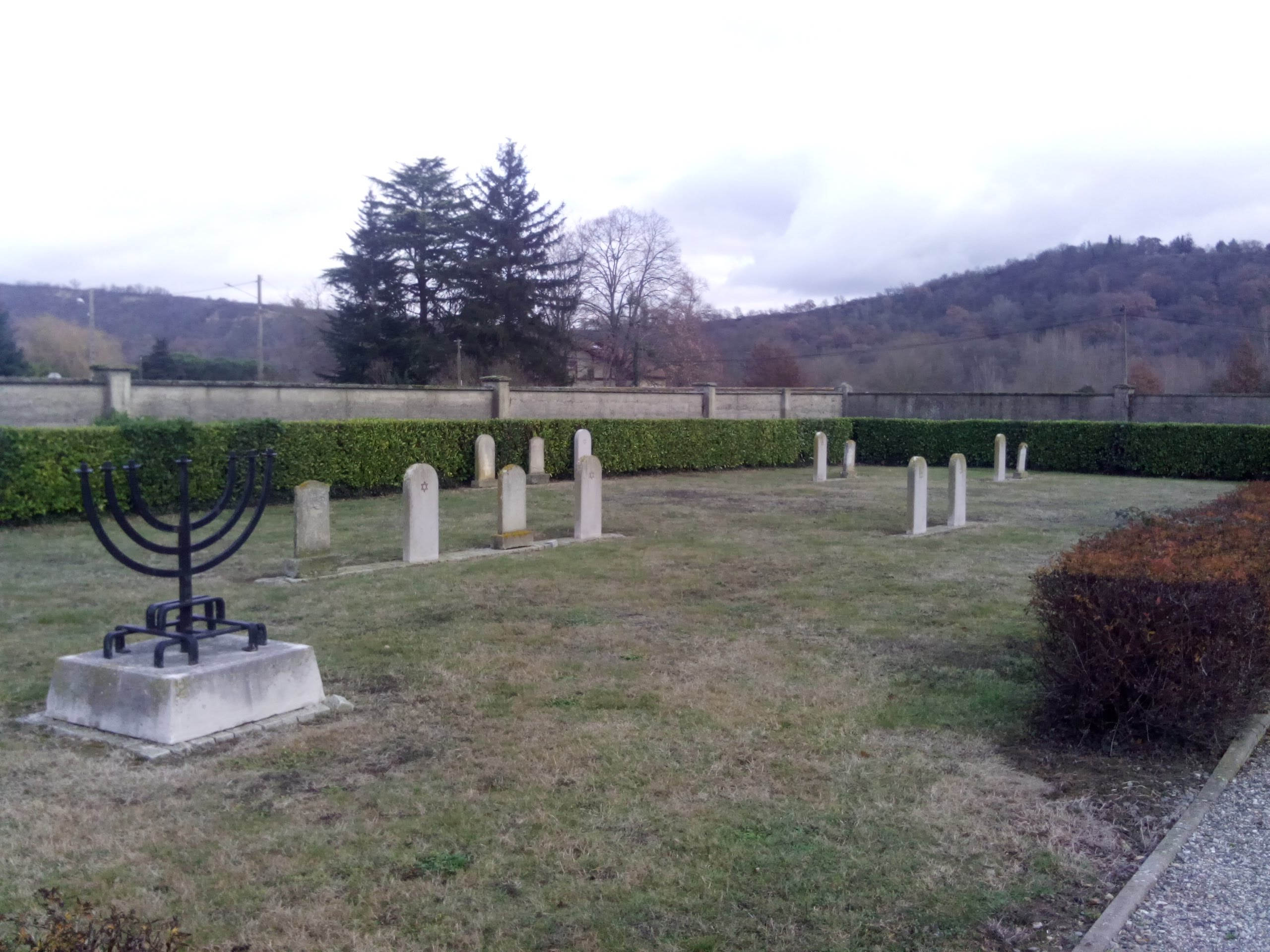
- Part of the Noah cemetery dedicated to the graves of Jews who died at Camp Noah during the Second World War

- Location within France
- Coordinates: 43°21′19″N 1°16′30″E
- Known for: Spanish Republicans, Jews
- Location: Noé, Haute-Garonne
- Built by: French Ministry of War
- Operational: 1937-1947
- Number of inmates: circa 2500
- Liberated by: Maquis (19 August 1944)

Camp de Noé was in 14 hectare internment camp straddling the municipalities of Noé, Le Fauga and Mauzac, south of Toulouse (Haute-Garonne). It should not be confused with the Mauzac detention camp in the Dordogne.

== History ==
This camp was created in 1941 by the French Ministry of War to hold Spanish Republicans and Jews under Vichy France's antisemitic laws. The camp occupied about 14 hectares to the north of Noé where about 2,500 foreigners, about half Jews and half Spanish were held here from February 1941 until July 1942.

The camp was liberated by the Maquis on 19 August 1944 and was then used for the internment of collaborators, but with the same guards. It finally closed in 1947.

== People who passed through the camp ==
- Alexander Grothendieck
- Henri Caillavet
- Jules Saliège
- Francesco Fausto Nitti

== Bibliography ==
- Éric Malo, Les Camps d'internement du Midi de la France, Municipal Library of Toulouse, 1990
- Denis Peschanski, Les Camps d'internement en France, Paris, PUF, 2002

== See also ==
- Camp du Récébédou
- Épuration légale
- Fondation pour la Mémoire de la Shoah
- Internment camps in France
