= Mono Grande =

Mythical South American ape

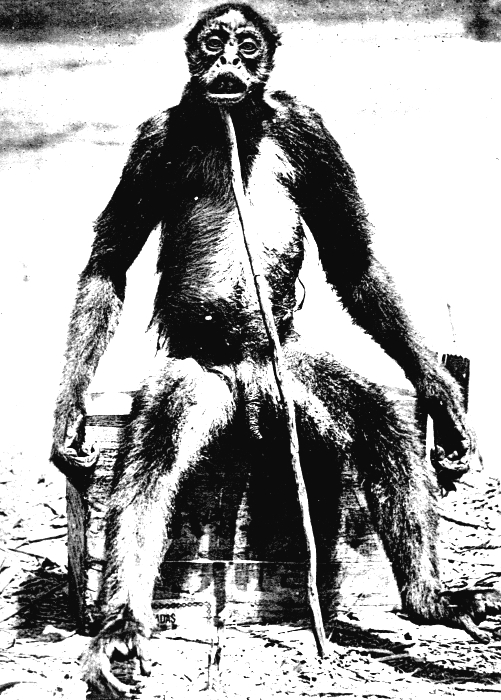
De Loys's ape

The Mono Grande (Spanish for "Large Monkey"), a large monkey-like creature, has been occasionally reported in South America. Such creatures are reported as being much larger than the commonly accepted New World monkeys. These accounts have received rather little publicity, and typically generated little or no interest from experts.

== Older reports and sightings ==
The German naturalist Alexander von Humboldt, who travelled in South America during early 19th century, heard stories from Orinoco about furry human-like creatures called Salvaje ("Wild"), which were rumoured to capture women, build huts and to occasionally eat human flesh. He attached no belief to the myth. The naturalist Philip Gosse also tried to examine these legends during his travels in Venezuela during the mid-19th century, but with no real success.

== Modern reports and sightings ==
The so-called De Loys's ape was photographed by Swiss geologist Francois de Loys in 1920 and proposed as a possible unknown great ape of South America; it has since been identified as almost certainly a spider monkey, after being first debunked by Sir Arthur Keith (1929).

In the 1940s, American scientist Philip Herschkowitz traveled in the same areas as de Loys, and concluded that the story was a myth whose origin was the spider monkey, Ateles belzebuth. However, in 1951, a Frenchman named Roger Courteville claimed to have seen an apeman at the same Tarra River where de Loys said he had seen his creatures. Like de Loys, he presented a photograph of the creature as evidence, though he was accused of perpetrating a hoax with a manipulated photograph (based on Loys photograph).

== Criticism ==
As mentioned above, Humboldt considered the reports of Salvaje to be just myths that came to South America with European colonists. The Swedish author Rolf Blomberg speculates that rumours of hidden monsters in the Amazon basin might have been inspired by Arthur Conan Doyle's book The Lost World (1912) combined with exaggerated reports of sightings of unusually large spider monkeys, and Sjögren remarked: "For critically educated zoologists is of course all this 'ape mystery' just a good joke".

Beyond humans, hominids (Hominoidea) are restricted to the Old World, while the New World is populated by smaller, often arboreal monkeys with long tails and flatter noses (Platyrrhini).

== See also ==
- Apeman
