= Portet-sur-Garonne =

- Commune
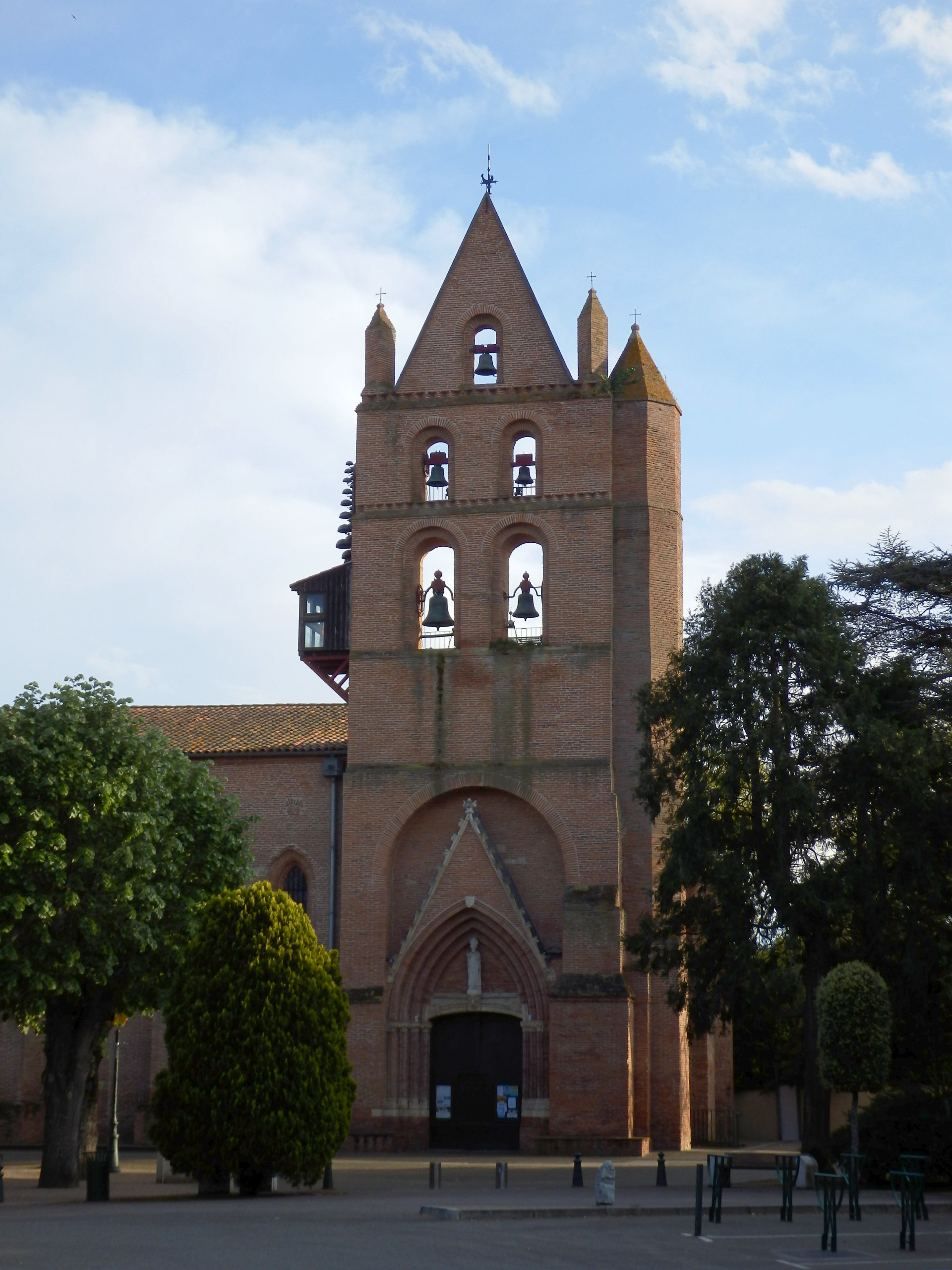
- The church in Portet-sur-Garonne

- Coat of arms
- Location of Portet-sur-Garonne
- Location within France Location within Occitanie
- Coordinates: 43°31′23″N 1°24′24″E
- Country: France
- Region: Occitania
- Department: Haute-Garonne
- Arrondissement: Muret
- Canton: Portet-sur-Garonne
- Intercommunality: Le Muretain Agglo

Government
  - Mayor (2020–2026): Thierry Suaud
- Area^{1}: 16.19 km^{2} (6.25 sq mi)
- Elevation: 150 m (490 ft)
- Highest elevation: 235 m (771 ft)
- Lowest elevation: 142 m (466 ft)
- Population (2023): 9,782
  - Density: 604.2/km^{2} (1,565/sq mi)
- Time zone: UTC+01:00 (CET)
  - Summer (DST): UTC+02:00 (CEST)
- INSEE/Postal code: 31433 /31120
- ^{1} French Land Register data, which excludes lakes, ponds, glaciers > 1 km^{2} (0.386 sq mi or 247 acres) and river estuaries.

Portet-sur-Garonne (French pronunciation: [pɔʁtɛ syʁ ɡaʁɔn], literally Portet on Garonne; Languedocien: Portèth de Garona) is a commune in the Haute-Garonne department in southwestern France. Portet-Saint-Simon station has rail connections to Foix, Tarbes, and Toulouse, which is the nearest big city, about 10 km away.

== Population ==
The inhabitants of the commune are known as Portésiens in French.

Historical population

Year	Pop.	±% p.a.
1793	700	—
1800	749	+0.97%
1806	794	+0.98%
1821	730	−0.56%
1831	807	+1.01%
1836	914	+2.52%
1841	871	−0.96%
1846	1,027	+3.35%
1851	1,073	+0.88%
1856	1,108	+0.64%
1861	1,121	+0.23%
1866	1,117	−0.07%
1872	1,006	−1.73%
1876	1,042	+0.88%
1881	1,024	−0.35%
1886	1,017	−0.14%
1891	1,060	+0.83%
1896	937	−2.44%
1901	897	−0.87%

Year	Pop.	±% p.a.
1906	874	−0.52%
1911	870	−0.09%
1921	827	−0.51%
1926	898	+1.66%
1931	987	+1.91%
1936	1,209	+4.14%
1946	2,071	+5.53%
1954	3,820	+7.95%
1962	4,398	+1.78%
1968	5,432	+3.58%
1975	6,014	+1.46%
1982	6,872	+1.92%
1990	8,030	+1.97%
1999	8,733	+0.94%
2007	9,781	+1.43%
2012	9,406	−0.78%
2017	9,721	+0.66%
2023	9,782	+0.10%

Source: EHESS and INSEE (1968-2023)

== See also ==
- Camp du Récébédou
- Communes of the Haute-Garonne department
