= George Montandon =

French anthropologist

- Born: George-Alexis Montandon; 19 April 1879; Cortaillod, Switzerland
- Died: 30 August 1944 (aged 65)
- Cause of death: Execution by shooting
- Occupation: Anthropologist
- Known for: Le Juif et la France; De Loys's ape

George-Alexis Montandon (French pronunciation: [ʒɔʁʒ mɔ̃tɑ̃dɔ̃]; 19 April 1879 – 30 August 1944) was a Swiss French anthropologist. He was a proponent of scientific racism prior to World War II. During the German occupation of France, he was responsible for the antisemitic exhibition Le Juif et la France.

George Montandon helped to perpetuate the hoax of De Loys's ape and fought for it be scientifically recognised as a new species. He was heavily ridiculed for his hypothesis. Today, De Loys's ape is virtually unanimously regarded as a hoax.

Ethnologist at the Musée de l'Homme, theoretician of racism, collaborator and anti-Semite, he was one of the guarantors of a so-called "scientific" racism before the Second World War. However, even under Vichy, he and the movement to which he belonged with René Martial remained marginal in the French intellectual world.

George Montandon was an advocate for racist eugenics theories. He and his wife were killed by the French Resistance for collaborating with the Nazis.
