= Tarra River (Colombia) =

Coordinates: 8.6919°N 72.9392°W

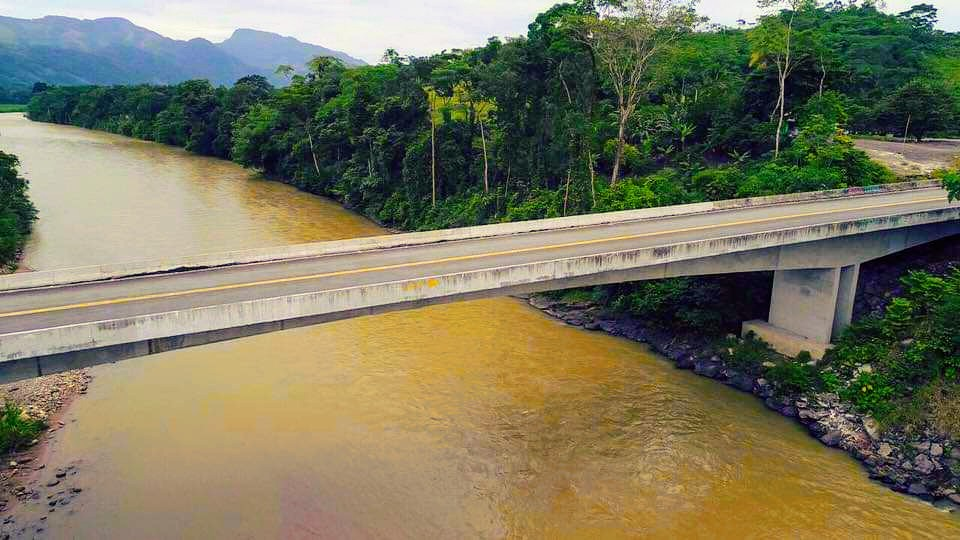

Location
- Country: Colombia

The Tarra River is a river of Colombia. It drains into Lake Maracaibo via the Catatumbo River. Several discredited claims of large monkey-like creatures originated in this region.

== See also ==
- List of rivers of Colombia
