= René Gérard (propagandist) =

French propagandist

René Gérard was a French antisemitic propagandist.

In 1942, he became secretary general of the Institute for the Study of Jewish Questions, an antisemitic propaganda office subsidized by the Nazis.
