= Institut d'étude des questions juives =

Antisemitic propaganda organization in German-occupied France

The Institut d'étude des questions juives (IEQJ) (Institute for the Study of Jewish Questions) was an antisemitic propaganda organization created in France under the German occupation during World War II, with the support of the Propagandastaffel (German Propaganda Office) and under the regulation of the Gestapo.

== Terminology ==
Originally known as the Bureau d'information et d'étude des questions juives (Office of Information and Research on Jewish Affairs) it was soon renamed to Institut d'étude des questions juives and officially launched on 11 May 1941. The name of the organization is variously translated, with a majority using the literal rendering, Institute for the Study of Jewish Questions, while some sources in English use the more accurate Institute for the Study of Jewish Affairs. In March 1943, the IEQJ became the Institut d'études des questions juives et ethnoraciales (Institute for Research on Jewish and Ethnoracial Affairs) (IEQJR).

It should not be confused with the Institute for Research on the Jewish Question, the Nazi party institute in Frankfurt.

== Activities ==
The first Secretary General of the IEQJ was Paul Sézille. He remained in the post until 1942, and was succeeded by journalist René Gérard. The co-founder was Octave Bellet.

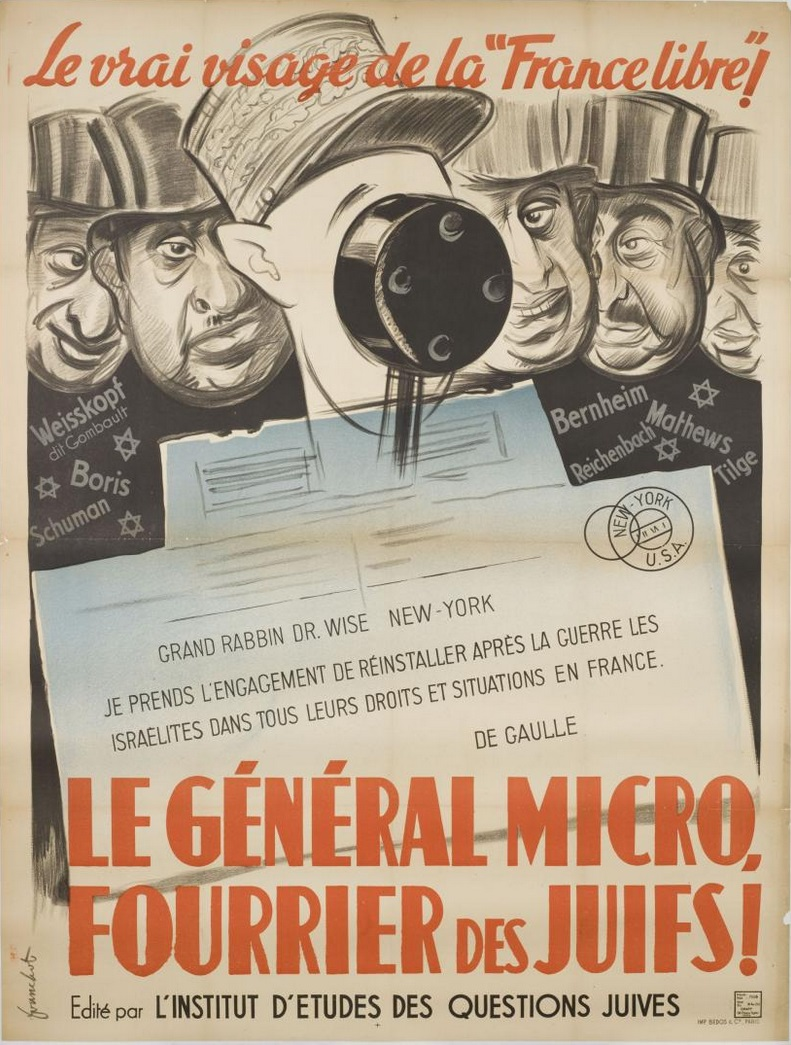
Antisemitic, anti-Gaullist poster published by the Commissariat-General for Jewish Affairs in November 1941.

The IEQJ was based in Paris at 21 rue La Boétie in a building belonging to art dealer Paul Rosenberg, who was owner of a major art gallery in Paris that had been requisitioned by the Nazis. As a private organization under direct control of the German authority, the IEQJ had no formal link with the Vichy regime. Its main role was the spreading of antisemitic propaganda and the publication of the magazine Le Cahier jaune directed by André Chaumet which published 13 issues between November 1941 and February 1943. This was followed by a second magazine entitled Revivre (with the subtitle "The great illustrated magazine about race") published from March 1943 to 20 July 1944, this time in direct connection with Vichy, and this, too, directed by Chaumet. The IEQJ also published La Question juive en France ("The Jewish Question in France").

The most important action of the IEQJ was their sponsorship of the exhibition Le Juif et la France ("Jews and France") which began in September 1941.

Financing of the IEQJ was provided by the German intelligence service of the German Embassy and by Theodor Dannecker, head of the Amt IV J of the Gestapo, responsible for "the Jewish question". Funding was for 200,000 francs the first months, and 50,000 francs thereafter.

The IEQJ was absorbed into the propaganda department of the Commissariat-General for Jewish Affairs to be expanded, and replaced in March 1943 by Institut d'études des questions juives et ethnoraciales (IEQJR) ("Institute for the Study of Jewish and Ethno-Racial Issues") headed by George Montandon.

== Sources ==
- Billig, Joseph (1974). L'Institut d'étude des questions juives, officine française des autorités nazies en France: inventaire commenté de la collection de documents provenant des archives de l'Institut conservés au C.D.J.C. [The Institute for the Study of Jewish Affairs, the French office of the Nazi authorities in France: annotated inventory of the collection of documents from the Institute's archives kept at the C.D.J.C.] (in French). Paris: C.D.J.C. OCLC 638327722. "Le nouvel Institut d'Etude des Questions Juives dont l'appellation exacte était « Institut d'Etudes des Questions Juives et EthnoRaciales », eut une existence éphémère en comparaison avec l'IEQJ de Sézille."
- Pierre-André Taguieff, Grégoire Kauffmann, Mickaël Lenoire, L'antisémitisme de plume - 1940-1944 - études et documents, Paris, 1999, Berg International Éditeurs - ISBN 2-911289-16-1
- "Octave Bellet" in Laurent Joly, Les Collabos. Treize portraits d’après les archives des services secrets de Vichy, des Renseignements Généraux et de l’Épuration, Éditions Les Échappés, 2011 ISBN 978-2357660458.

== See also ==
- Union générale des israélites de France
- Paris in World War II
- Antisemitism in France
