= Camp du Récébédou =

Internment camp in Portet-sur-Garonne, France

- Concentration camp
- Location within France
- Coordinates: 43°32′31″N 1°24′31″E
- Location: Portet-sur-Garonne, Haute-Garonne
- Built by: French Third Republic
- Operated by: French Third Republic, Vichy France
- Operational: February 1941-September 1942

Camp du Récébédou was an internment camp for Spanish Republicans and Jews, in existence from February 1941 until September 1942, located in the municipality of Portet-sur-Garonne, south of Toulouse. Internees were transported by train via Drancy to Auschwitz, and other extermination camps.

== History ==
=== Récébédou area ===
Around 1560, the land of Jehan de Gilbert, who was the receiver of judgments in Rivière Verdun, that was known locally as "farm of the receiver" (in Occitan: borda del recevedor or "bordo del récébédou"). The land, situated on the banks of the Garonne consisted mainly of farmland and forest, has retained the name. During the French Revolution, the land was confiscated as Biens nationaux ("for the good of the nation") and in 1791 acquired by a Toulouse innkeeper Daumont, who renovated the buildings of the farm, which became the castle of Clairfont.

In 1939, the land was acquired to build a city for the workers of the national explosives factory of Toulouse. It was made up of 87 small single-storey brick buildings offering reasonable comfort.

=== Internment camp ===
==== Refugee centre ====
The second world war brought about a change in the use of the city of Récébédou under the management by the municipality of Toulouse. In June 1940 it was used to house refugees, Jews expelled from Germany who were in Belgium and northern France. That July, faced with the influx of Spanish republican refugees and Jews fleeing the occupied zone of France, the city became a reception center for refugees and escapees.

==== Hospital camp ====
In February 1941, it was taken over by the prefecture of Haute-Garonne and becomes an official hospital camp for old and sick internees, with a planned workforce of 1,400. Vichy's policy made it a semi-open institution, allowing journalists and charities to inspect it. The Vichy regime considered using it for propaganda purposes.

In the beginning, the conditions were reasonable, but deteriorated quickly due to lack of medical equipment, medicines, and the lack of food. In 1941 there were 739 internees, half were over 60 years of age and suffered from serious illnesses. During the winter of 1941–1942, hunger, cold and sickness, left 118 dead, and a total of 314 people, including 254 Jews, died.

Several convoys of deportees left Récébédou during August 1942. Some left as early as August 11 but most on the nights of 26–28 August from Portet-sur-Garonne in freight cars, taking the internees to the camp of Drancy whose records mention three convoys departing for Auschwitz with 349 Jews from Récébédou.

==== Archbishop's indignation ====
Monsignor Jules-Géraud Saliège, archbishop of Toulouse actively protested the policy against the Jews and insisted on the closure of camps at Noé and Récébédou in a pastoral letter read out in all the parishes of his dioceses on 23 August. His actions, with that of humanitarian organizations like the Cimade and the Red Cross, provided some support to the internees. From September 1942, the internees were progressively directed to other hospitals of the region, and the camp ended its activity. The camp was officially closed in October 1942 on the pretext of being too close to Toulouse.

When the German troops entered Toulouse in late 1942, for a short time the camp served to house some Wehrmacht personnel.

=== Don Quixote's villa ===
At the liberation of France, Spanish Republicans who had escaped from Mauthausen concentration camp, but were unable to return to their country, stayed in a dozen buildings in the camp. This colony was known as the "Villa Don Quixote".

=== Musée de la Mémoire ===
In one preserved building, the Musée de la Mémoire was established as a memorial museum dedicated to the history of the camp where visitors can view documents, models and reconstructions. The museum was inaugurated on 6 February 2003 by Elie Wiesel.

A French documentary film about Laurette Alexis-Monet volunteering at the camp and directed by Francis Fourcou was released in 2016. Laurette 1942, une volontaire au camp du Récébédou, was based on the book Les Miradors de Vichy by Alexis-Monet, a Cimade member. The historian Pierre Vidal-Naquet has criticised the book as being a scam and a fictitious story.

== See also ==
- Camp de Noé
- Fondation pour la Mémoire de la Shoah
- Internment camps in France
- fr:Musée de la Mémoire

=== Bibliography ===
- Malo, Éric Les Camps d'internement du Midi de la France, Municipal Library of Toulouse, 1990.
- Peschanski, Denis Les Camps d'internement en France, Paris, PUF, 2002.
- Un centre de détention de la Seconde Guerre Mondiale cible de tags nazis
