= Pithiviers internment camp =

Concentration camp in Vichy France during WWII

Coordinates: 48°10′14″N 2°14′30″E

Pithiviers
- Transit camp
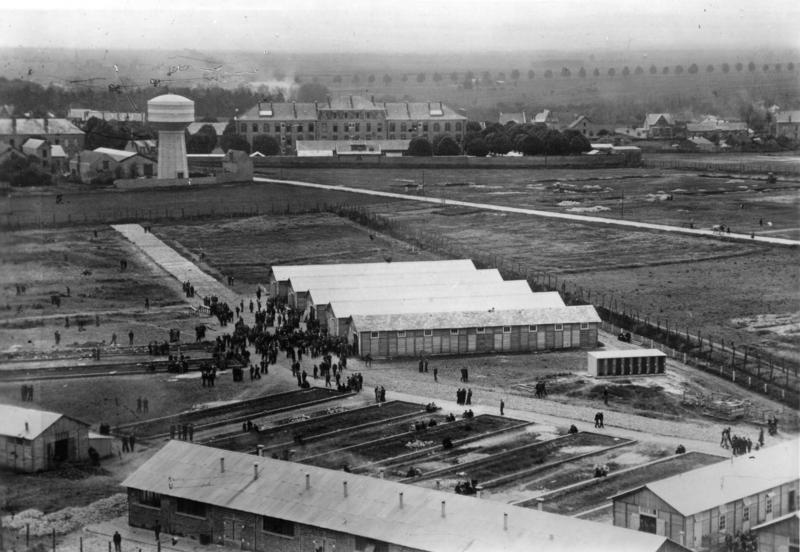
- Pithiviers camp in 1941

- Location within France
- Location: Pithiviers, Loiret; German-occupied France
- Operated by: French Police (May 1941 – May 1942); German authorities
- Original use: POW camp
- Operational: 14 May 1941 – 9 August 1944
- Inmates: French and Foreign Jews
- Killed: 6,800 deported to Auschwitz (Sept 1942)
- Notable inmates: Irène Némirovsky

Pithiviers internment camp [pi.ti.vje] was a concentration camp in Vichy France, located 37 kilometres north-east of Orléans, closely associated with Beaune-la-Rolande internment camp in deporting foreign-born and some French-born Jews between 1941 and 1943, during World War II.

Originally intended for German POWs, Pithiviers initially housed refugees and later French POWs. On 14 May 1941, foreign-born Jews (mostly Polish expatriates living in the Paris Prefecture) were arrested and interned there during the Green Ticket round-up, and in July 1942, during the Vélodrome d'Hiver round-up. Most of the inmates were sent to Auschwitz concentration camp where they were murdered.

Prisoners engaged in forced labor inside and outside the camp, with some being paid. The camp had an infirmary, staffed by Jewish inmates, maintaining basic healthcare. Despite harsh conditions, prisoners maintained aspects of Jewish life, holding services, celebrating holidays, and supporting cultural activities. Resistance took various forms: leaders advocated for better conditions while some collaborated secretly with the Union des Juifs pour la Résistance et l'Entr'aide, a secret resistance organisation formed by Jewish Communists in Paris. The camp, with 19 barracks, workshops, a canteen and an infirmary, was fenced, close to town, and supervised by French gendarmes during its first year of operation.

In May 1942, German authorities under SS Officer Theodor Dannecker, took over operations with the first transport to Auschwitz leaving on 25 June 1942. By September of that year at least 6,080 inmates had been deported. The camp then reverted to French control holding primarily non-Jewish communist prisoners. In March 1944, some inmates successfully dug a tunnel under the infirmary and managed to escape. The camp was liberated on 9 August 1944, having come under Allied aerial bombardment.

== History ==
Initially an abandoned train station, the camp was created at the start of World War II to hold German prisoners of war then French pows. Joseph Darnand, future collaborator and leader of the Milice, was interned at the Pithiviers camp as a prisoner of war before he escaped in August 1940.

Following the Law on the status of Jews of 4 October 1940, prefects were allowed to intern foreign Jews in designated camps. Jews detained in Pithiviers were mostly Polish expatriates living in Paris Prefecture. Children were separated there from their parents; the adults were processed and deported to concentration camps farther away. Inmates were guarded by Vichy officials acting under Nazi supervision, and housed in 19 barracks. Pithiviers also held various administrative buildings, including an infirmary and canteen, and a large vegetable garden. Prisoners were forced to work both inside the camp, namely in its workshops and garden, and in outside farms and plants of the surrounding villages.

The Pithiviers camp was evacuated at the end of September 1942, and transformed into a detention camp for political prisoners until August 1944.

In 2018, France's national rail company, SNCF, announced the allocation of $2.3 million toward construction of a new museum expected to open in 2020 at the one-time camp site. With SNCF's logistical support, some 16,000 Jews were sent to be murdered in death camps from Pithiviers station and the neighboring camp of Beaune-la-Rolande in eight transports between 1941 and 1943. SNCF made plans to work in conjunction with CRIF, an umbrella group representing French Jewish communities, to restore the dilapidated Pithiviers rail station to its wartime appearance. Educational materials, including an exhibition center detailing the internment of Europe's Jews and study rooms for visitors and school children, will be housed within the station-turned-museum. (No information on the status of this museum is found at this time)

The buildings were demolished during the 1950s for material reasons, not without the agreement of the memorial associations. Only the Infirmary, currently located at 2 rue de Pontournois, has been preserved, and serves as a residence. The guard post, at the entrance to the camp, was in the center of what is now Square Max-Jacob, 50 rue de l'Ancien camp, and next to it, a stone monument was erected to honor the accounts of the survivors, and to identify the importance of the location. The internment camp reached from the guard post to the current athletics stadium, which is set back from 14 rue Gabriel-Lelong.

A "Memorial of the deportation of the Pithivier and Beaune la Rolande camps" is located at Square Max Jacob, 45300 Pithiviers, France.

=== Deportation of Jews ===
From September 1940, under German orders, French authorities identified and maintained lists of Jews and violently plundered their belongings. Shortly thereafter, the Vichy regime publicly proclaimed the Law on the status of Jews (law of October 3, 1940) which enforced the internment of Jews. Theodor Dannecker, representative of Adolf Eichmann in Paris from September 1940 to August 1942, and Carltheo Zeitschel worked together to accelerate the exclusion of Jews from society. On April 22, 1941, Theodor Dannecker informed the regional prefect Jean-Pierre Ingrand (1905–1992), representative of the Ministry of the Interior in the occupied zone, of the transformation of the Pithiviers prison camp into an internment camp, with transfer of its management to the French authorities.

The Vichy government thus transformed the prisoner of war camp into an internment camp for Jews arrested in roundups, specifically the Green ticket roundup on May 14, 1941, and then the Vel d'Hiv roundups of July 16 and 17, 1942.

When the Pithiviers internment camp was full, the Beaune-la-Rolande internment camp was identified to alloe for a total capacity of 5000 Jews. Six convoys set out from Pithiviers on June 25, July 17 (6th convoy), July 31, August 3 and September 21, 1942, transporting 6,079 Jews to Auschwitz. Only 115 survived Pithiviers internment camp, 1.8% of the deportees.

Arrested on July 13, 1942, the novelist Irène Némirovsky, author of the unfinished novel Suite française, was transported there on July 15, 1942, and deported on July 17 to Auschwitz on the 6th convoy. She died there a month later of the flu (according to the camp certificate), more likely of typhus.

=== Convoys ===
The following convoys left from the Pithiviers internment camp to deliver Jews to Auschwitz:

- Convoy 4 of June 25, 1942 (999 prisoners)
- Convoy 6 of July 17, 1942 (928 prisoners)
- Convoy 13 of July 31, 1942 (1049 prisoners)
- Convoy 14 of August 3, 1942 (1034 prisoners)
- Convoy 16 of August 7, 1942 (1069 prisoners)
- Convoy 35 of September 21, 1942 (1000 prisoners)

== See also ==
- Antisemitism in France
- Fall of France
- French Jews
- History of the Jews in France
- Timeline of deportations of French Jews to death camps

== Sources ==
- Klarsfeld, S. (1983). Memorial to the Jews Deported from France, 1942-1944: Documentation of the Deportation of the Victims of the Final Solution in France. B. Klarsfeld Foundation.
- Megargee, G.P.; White, J. (2018). The United States Holocaust Memorial Museum Encyclopedia of Camps and Ghettos, 1933–1945, Volume III: Camps and Ghettos under European Regimes Aligned with Nazi Germany. Indiana University Press. ISBN 978-0-253-02386-5.

Some content in this edit was translated from the existing French Wikipedia article Pithiviers internment camp; see its history for attribution.
