= Royallieu-Compiègne internment camp =

Nazi concentration camp in France

Coordinates: 49°24′09″N 2°48′29″E

Royallieu-Compiègne
- internment camp
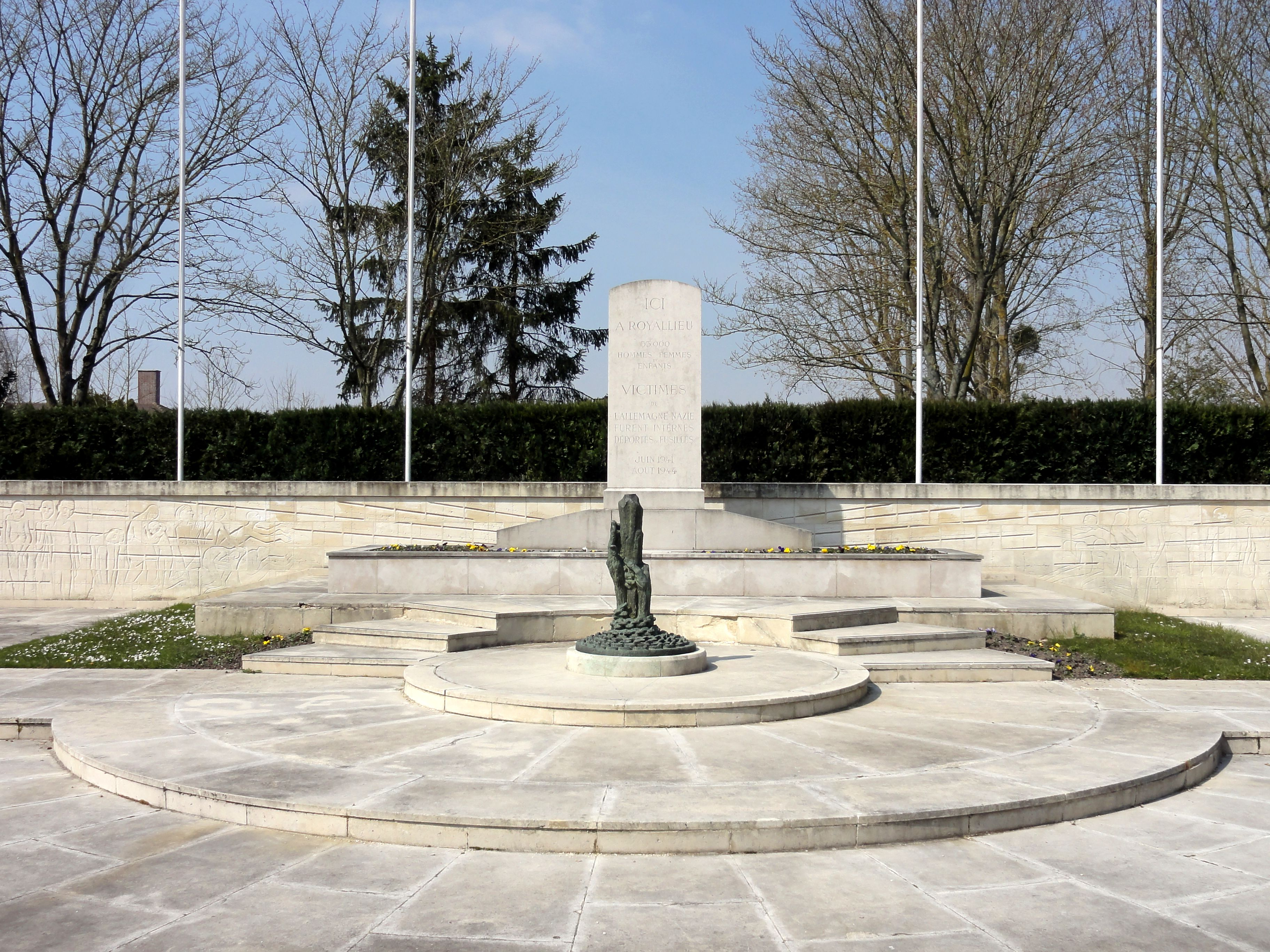
- Memorial at Camp Royallieu, inaugurated in 2008.

- Location within France
- Location: Compiègne, Oise; Occupied France
- Original use: French army barracks
- Operational: June 1941 – August 1944
- Inmates: political prisoners, Jews, high-ranking French civil servants
- Number of inmates: 54,000
- Killed: 50,000

The Royallieu-Compiègne was an internment and deportation camp located in the north of France in the city of Compiègne, open from June 1941 to August 1944. French resistance fighters and Jews were among some of the prisoners held in this camp. It is estimated that around 40,000 people were deported from the Royallieu-Compiègne camp to other camps in the German territory of the time.

A memorial of the camp, and another along the railway tracks commemorates the tragedy.

== History ==
Before World War II, this site was home to French army barracks. Previously, the site housed the signing of an armistice that displayed the victory of French forces in World War I on November 11, 1918.

=== World War II ===
This site witnessed its second armistice. This time, the site housed the signing of the occupation of France by German forces. This camp on June 22, 1940, became the only fully German run camp within French territories. In June 1941 the camp was fully functioning as an internment camp. The camp's prisoners were made up of 70 percent political prisoners, 12 percent Jews, and 8 percent high ranking French civil servants. Overwhelmingly the camp held resisters to Vichy France, the puppet government set up by Nazi supporters.

The camp's main function was as a deport base. The main camp that Royallieu-Compiègne deported to was Auschwitz among various other concentration camps. On March 27, 1942, the camp made its first round of Jewish deportations to Auschwitz.

The camp's records are not maintained well due to the actual number of detainees never being recorded precisely. For example, there is a record of the number of detainees transported in one cable car as a "guess". The camp was only in full use for three years: 1941–1944.

=== After World War II ===
The camp was shut down after the liberation of France. Visitors were not allowed until the opening of the memorial in early 2008.

== Memorial ==
On February 23, 2008, a memorial to internment and deportation (Mémorial de l'internement et de la déportation Camp de Royallieu) was opened on the site of the former internment and deportation camp of Compiègne.

The memorial site consists of a physical tour of the ground as well as educational tours of the individual rooms and barracks that the grounds consist of. As the site's memorial developed, it came to include a wall of names with those who were recorded as having been detained at the grounds as well as an escape route and a Garden of Remembrance.

== See also ==
- Union générale des israélites de France

== Gallery ==
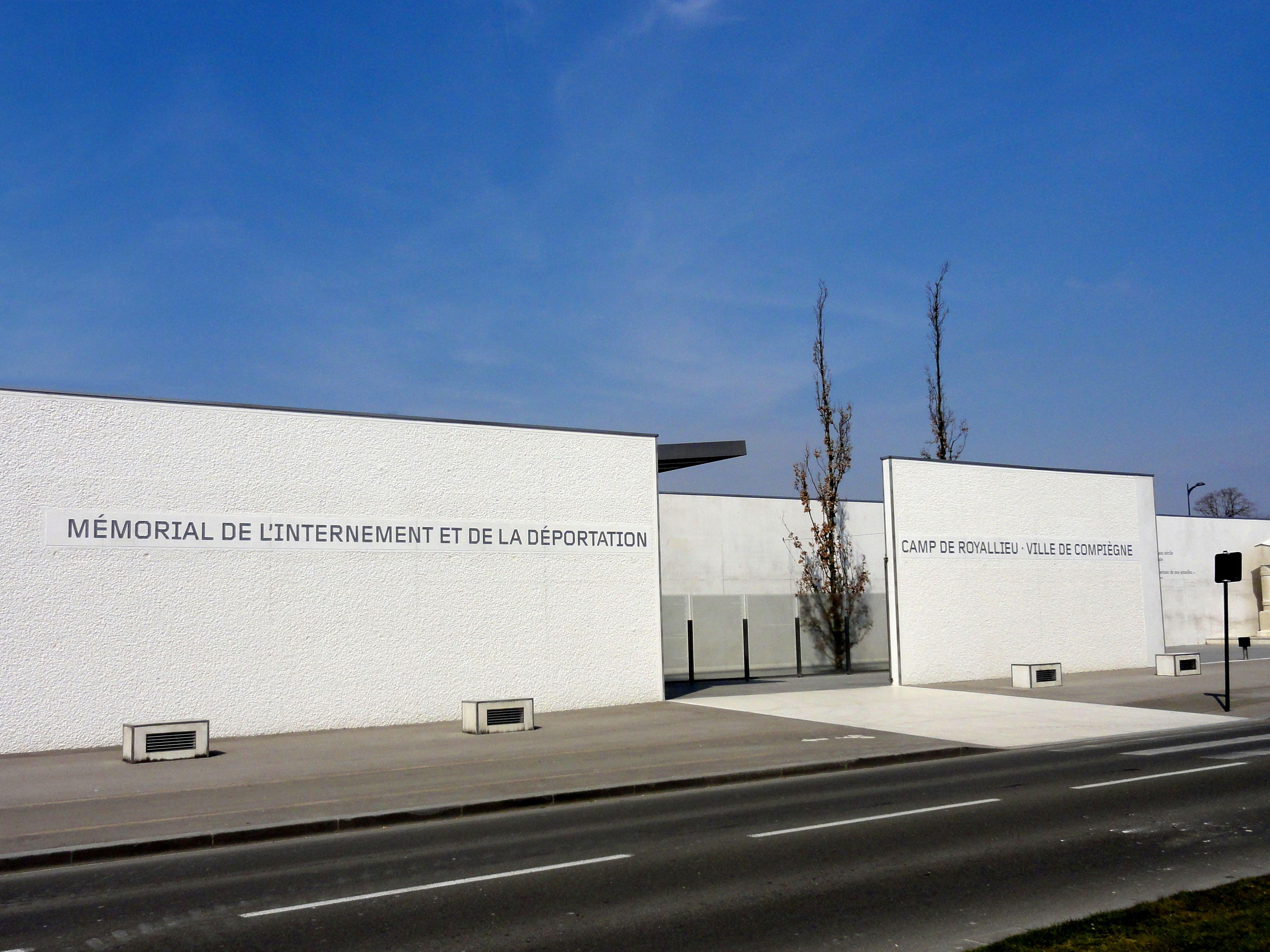
Entrance to the memorial at Royallieu

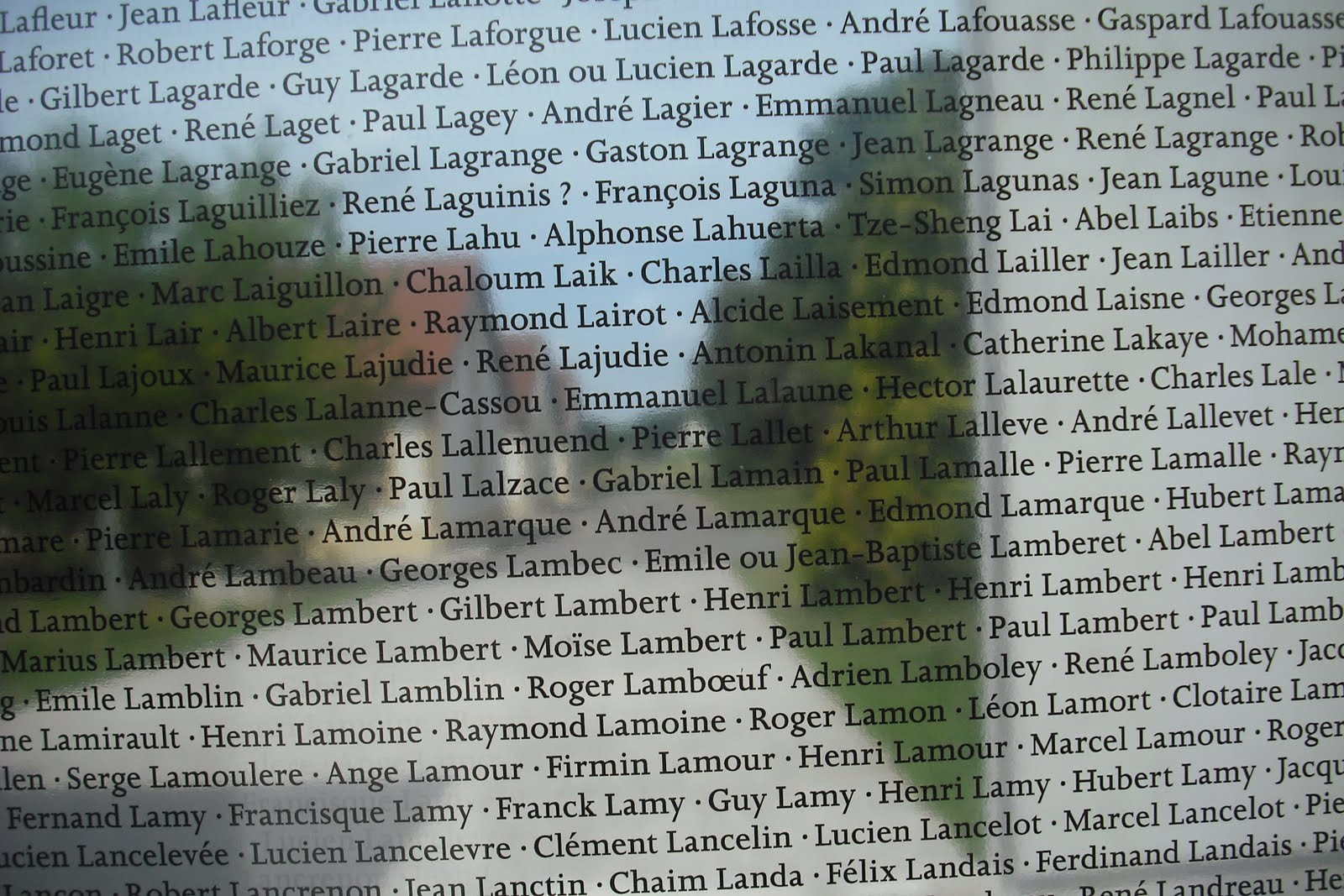
The "Wall of Names"

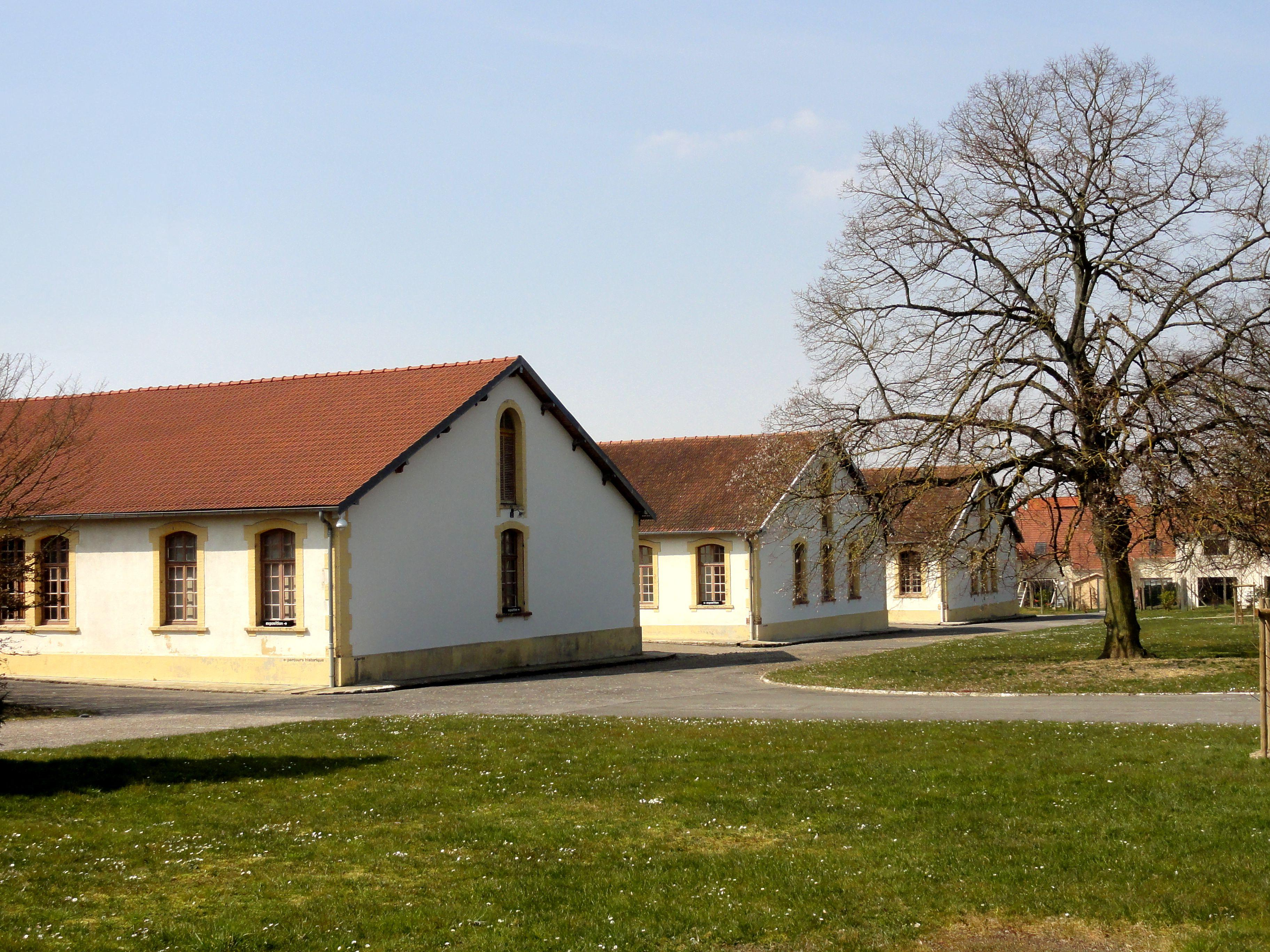
Barracks at the memorial

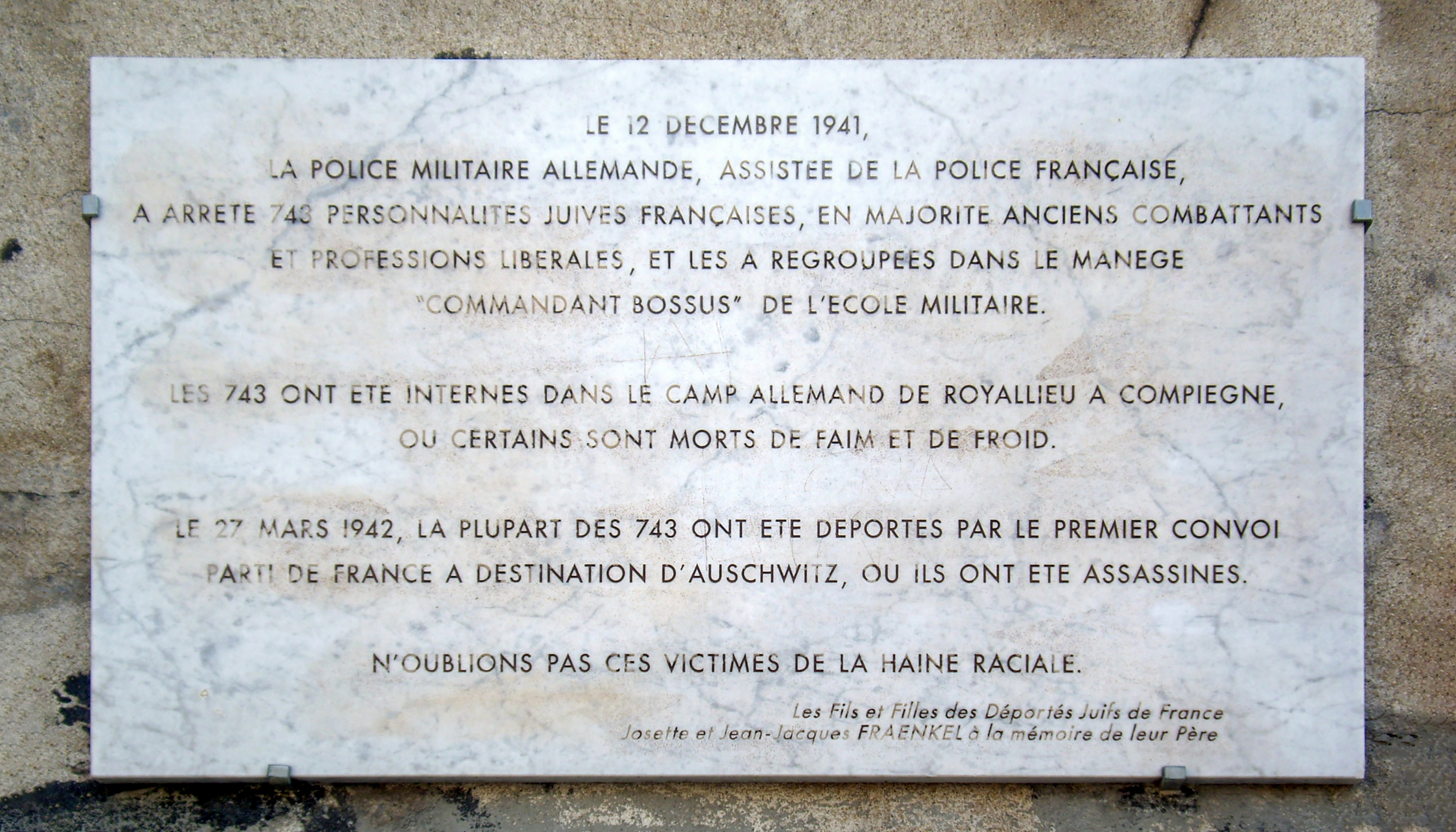
Plaque at École Militaire in Paris in memory of French Jews interned at Royallieu before deportation to Auschwitz

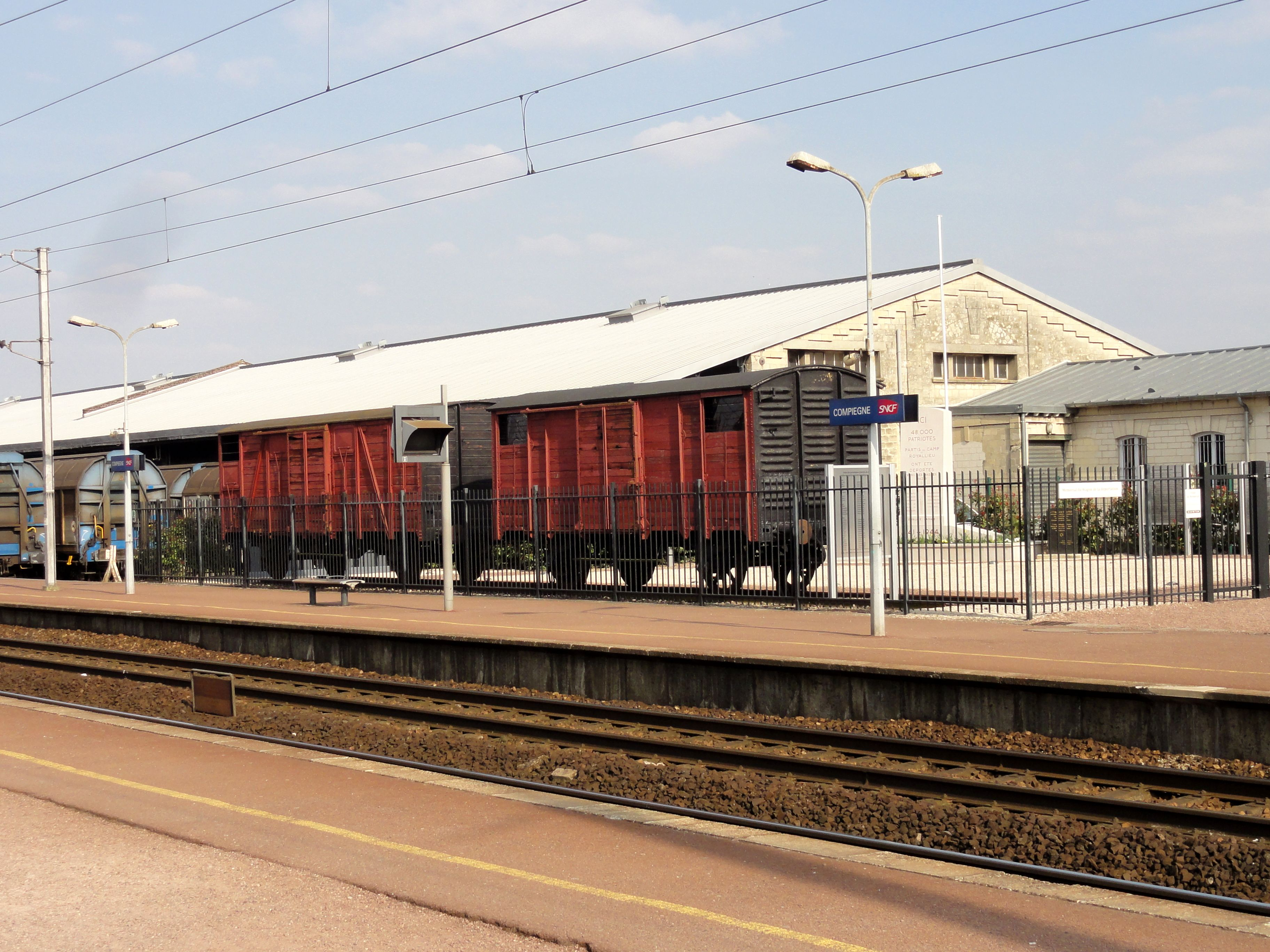
Memorial at the deportation railway platform
