= Reich Security Main Office Referat IV B4 =

Sub-department of the Reich Security Main Office in Nazi Germany

Adolf Eichmann, 1942

Reich Security Main Office Referat IV B4, known as RSHA IV B4 (German: Eichmannreferat IV D4 until March 1941, or Judenreferat), was a sub-department of Germany's Reich Security Main Office (Note: The Reichssicherheitshauptamt is variously translated in sources as "Reich Security Main Office", "Reich Main Security Office", "Reich Central Security Main Office", "Reich Security Central Office", "Reich Head Security Office", or "Reich Security Head Office".) (Reichssicherheitshauptamt or RSHA) and the Gestapo during the Holocaust. Led by SS-Obersturmbannführer Adolf Eichmann, RSHA IV B4 was responsible for "Jewish affairs and evacuation" in German-occupied Europe, and specifically for the deportation of Jews from outside Poland to concentration or extermination camps. Within Poland, the liquidation of the ghettos and transport of Jews was handled by the SS and local police departments.

The sub-department was a natural successor to the Central Office for Jewish Emigration which had initially been established by Eichmann in Vienna in August 1938. On 24 January 1939, the Reich Central Office for Jewish Emigration (Reichszentrale für jüdische Auswanderung) was established in Berlin by Hermann Göring with Reinhard Heydrich as chief. It was charged with the task of using all available means to prompt Jews to emigrate, and for establishing a Jewish organization that would incorporate all of German Jewry and co-ordinate emigration from the Jewish side. An office was subsequently opened in Prague.

Following a reorganization of the RSHA, in March 1941 Eichmann's office name and remit was changed from Group of countries IV D (Ländergruppe IV D) to Group of churches IV B (Kirchengruppe IV B), and was finally called Referat IV B 4. RSHA IV B4 managed the categorization of Jews, the imposition of anti-Jewish legislation in the country concerned, the eventual removal of Jews from that country, and their deportation to a camp and usually the gas chamber. Unit IV B4 was also in charge of the Reich Association of Jews in Germany, which oversaw all Jewish organizations.

Jews were carried to the camps in freight trains that had to be booked and paid for. The Deutsche Reichsbahn (German state railway) charged a one-way fare for the deportees and a return fare for the guards. The RSHA was billed for trains carrying Jews.

== Hierarchy ==
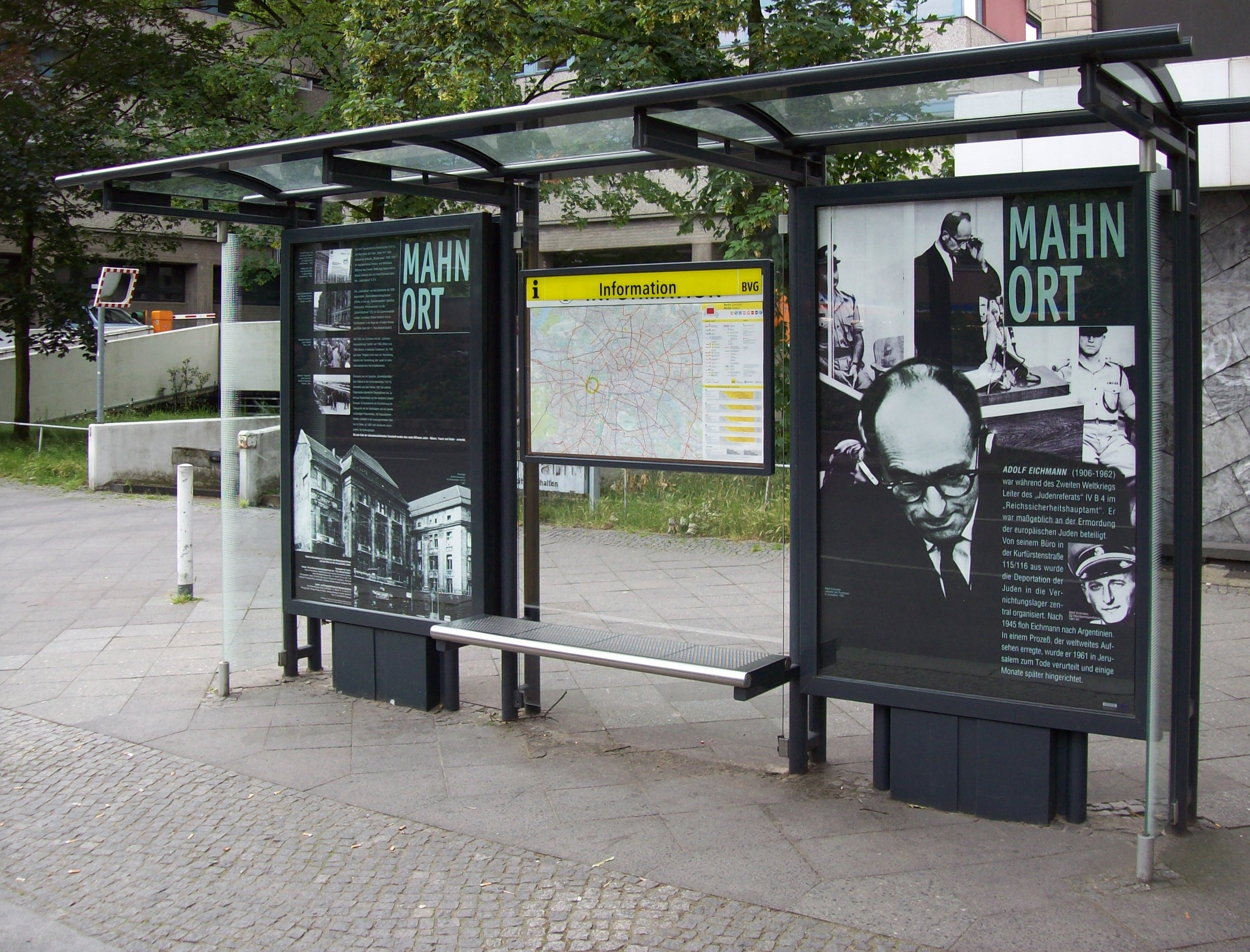
Memorial on bus stop outside Kurfürstenstraße 115/116, Berlin, 2009

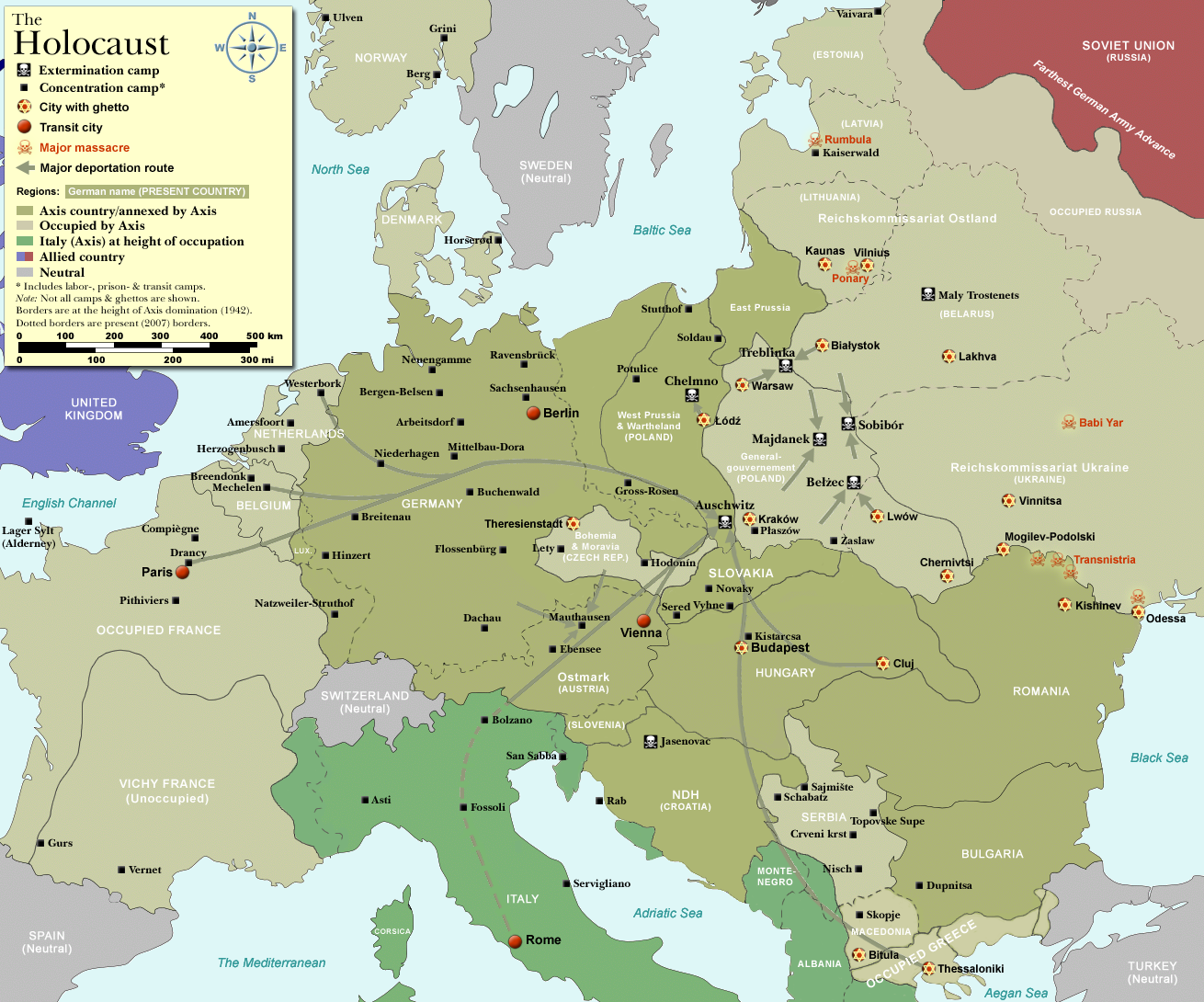
Camps and deportation routes, German-occupied Europe, 1942

Due to its large size compared to other RSHA departments (which were housed in Prinz-Albrecht-Strasse), Unit IV B4 was based in Kurfürstenstraße 115/116, Berlin. The building was the former club and residential building of the Jewish Brotherhood and was managed by Eichmann's adjutant Rudolf Jaenisch.

The departmental hierarchy, according to Raul Hilberg:

RSHA: Originally led by Reinhard Heydrich until his death in June 1942, followed by Heinrich Himmler and Ernst Kaltenbrunner

Amt IV (Gestapo): Heinrich Müller

IV-B (Sects): Albert Hartl

IV-B-4 (Jews) Adolf Eichmann

IV-B-4-a (Evacuations): Rolf Günther

General matters: Fritz Wöhrn
Transport: Franz Novak
"Single cases": Ernst Moes

IV-B-4-b (Law): Friedrich Suhr, followed by Otto Hunsche

Deputy: Otto Hunsche
Finance and property: Richard Gutwasser
Foreign areas: Friedrich Boßhammer

RSHA IV B4 also had a large number of regional specialists who were deployed to various countries to assist with deportations - Anton Brunner, Dieter Wisliceny, Franz Abromeit, Siegfried Seidl, Hermann Krumey, Alois Brunner, Anton Burger, Theo Dannecker, and Hans Günther (who was the brother of Rolf Günther) being the principal figures.

== Bibliography ==
- Hilberg, Raul (1985). The Destruction of the European Jews. New York: Holmes & Meier. ISBN 0-8419-0910-5.
- Hilberg, Raul (2003). The Destruction of the European Jews. Vol. II (3rd ed.). New Haven and London: Yale University Press. ISBN 0-300-09587-2.
- Longerich, Peter (2012). Heinrich Himmler. Oxford: Oxford University Press. ISBN 978-0-19-959232-6.
- Wildt, Michael (2002). Generation des Unbedingten. Das Führungskorps des Reichssicherheitshauptamtes. Hamburg: Hamburger Edition. ISBN 3-930908-75-1.
