= Born Rich (2003 film) =

- DVD cover
- Directed by: Jamie Johnson
- Produced by: Dirk Wittenborn; Jamie Johnson
- Starring: Georgina Bloomberg; Stephanie Ercklentz; Christina Floyd; Cody Franchetti; Juliet Hartford; Josiah Hornblower; Jamie Johnson; S.I. Newhouse IV; Ivanka Trump; Luke Weil; Carlo von Zeitschel
- Cinematography: Nick Kurzon
- Edited by: Nick Kurzon; Steven Pilgrim
- Music by: Joel Goodman
- Production companies: Wise and Good Film, LLC
- Distributed by: HBO
- Release date: January 19, 2003 (Sundance Film Festival)
- Running time: 75 minutes (Sundance); 67 minutes (television)
- Country: United States
- Language: English
- Budget: $150,000

Born Rich is a 2003 documentary film about the experience of growing up in wealthy families. It was created by Jamie Johnson, an heir to the Johnson & Johnson fortune, and filmed primarily between 1999 and 2001. The film consists primarily of Johnson interviewing 10 other young heirs. These interviews are offset by Johnson's exploration of his own experience and family as he comes into a large inheritance on his 21st birthday. He seeks out how to be a productive person, avoiding the dysfunction that he sees affecting many of the very rich. The film explores the taboo the ultra rich have against talking about their wealth. Johnson believes this secrecy about wealth causes the wealthy to be dysfunctional, and exists because the discussion of their wealth challenges the notion that America is a meritocracy and their right to have their wealth.

== Cast ==
- Georgina Bloomberg — born to New York City mayor and media mogul, Michael Bloomberg.
- Stephanie Ercklentz — born to socialite Mai Harrison and New York corporate lawyer, Enno W. Ercklentz Jr., son of banker and industrialist Enno W. Ercklentz Sr.
- Christina Floyd — born to golf champion, Raymond Floyd.
- Cody Franchetti — an Italian baron and Milliken textiles heir, born to actress Angelica Ippolito and Baron Andrea Franchetti, son of Baron Mario Franchetti and American heiress Anne Milliken.
- Juliet Hartford — born to model Diane Brown and A&P heir, Huntington Hartford, grandson of a principal founder of A&P, George Huntington Hartford.
- Josiah Cheston Hornblower — a Vanderbilt / Whitney heir born to Alexandra Thorne, daughter of Whitney Tower, a grandson of Gertrude Vanderbilt and Harry Payne Whitney. He is also a descendant of Josiah Hornblower, a delegate from New Jersey to the Continental Congress.
- Jamie Johnson — born to Johnson & Johnson heir James Loring Johnson, son of John Seward Johnson I.
- S.I. Newhouse IV — born to Condé Nast publishing heir, Samuel Irving Newhouse III, son of Samuel Irving Newhouse Jr.
- Ivanka Trump — born to real estate tycoon and 45th and 47th US President, Donald Trump, son of real estate developer Fred Trump.
- Benjamin Luke Weil — son of Scientific Games Corporation Chairman & CEO, A. Lorne Weil.
- Carlo von Zeitschel — Kaiser Wilhelm II's great-grandson who is both a German baron and an Italian viscount.

== Production ==
=== Development and pre-production ===
Made over a three-year period while he was a history student at NYU, the documentary started out as his graduation thesis. At the age of 20, Johnson came up with the idea for the film through conversations with his uncle, Dirk Wittenborn, a novelist and screenwriter, who is also a producer of the film. Having been brought up reading F. Scott Fitzgerald, Johnson noted that no one of his class or background had attempted to examine issues of social class in America today. He was also personally motivated to make this film by his approaching inheritance on his 21st birthday, having observed that a lot of people with inherited wealth, including members of his family, “live unproductive lives, and even in some cases tragic and miserable lives.” He wanted to figure out why this occurs, to avoid that fate. The film makes reference to his grandfather, Seward Johnson, noting the conflicts from his third, late in life marriage to his chambermaid, and the longest, most expensive contested will trial in U.S. history that ensued after his death in 1983. During the trial there were ongoing headlines in The New York Times about the estate battle and lurid tales were revealed that humiliated his family. Johnson said, “My grandfather made some serious mistakes, he was born rich and I really didn’t want to be in the same situation that he found himself in at the end of his life.”

It took three years to make as most of the young heirs contacted to participate in the film turned him down, sometimes harshly, due to parental objection, fear of losing their inheritance, or fear of violating social taboo. A Campbell's soup heir and a Rockefeller initially agreed to participate but both of them backed out due to a parent's objections. The pre-production took two years and involved hundreds of phone calls to line up the "young inheritors". Johnson enlisted Bingo Gubelmann, a childhood friend who is a cousin of socialite Marjorie Gubelmann, to be a co-producer and to help recruit "inheritors" in their late teens to mid-20s who could live lavishly without ever having to work. 11 heirs ended up being interviewed.

=== Filming ===
By summer of 2000, after a year of filming, most of those interviewed were asking Johnson to take them out of the movie. Carlo von Zeitschel threatened a lawsuit but never filed. Johnson recalls people approaching him at parties telling him that he was a traitor to his class, that making the documentary was the "stupidest thing" he could do, it would not benefit anyone, and he would regret it and lose all his friends. When they were no longer able to get permission to film at parties, Johnson and Bingo had a "Roaring Twenties" themed joint 21st-birthday party for themselves at the East Hampton house of Johnson's parents. A sign posted at the entrance informed the guests they would be filmed for a documentary. They were worried that no one would come to the party because of their unpopularity with the rich due to the film, but four film subjects and 150 other guests attended. The movie ends at the party with Johnson's voice-over about living outside the American dream that was achieved by his great-grandfather. According to Johnson, the decadence of the party was intentional. He had always wanted to film the final scene, where he and Bingo pour Veuve Clicquot into a tower of champagne glasses, "as part of the movie about the unequal distribution of wealth in America."

=== Post-production ===
The editing process took over a year, with 45 hours of footage to edit. While the film was being edited, Wittenborn wrote an article about the film that appeared in the September 2002 issue of W magazine. After hearing early reports about the film, Luke Weil filed a lawsuit on September 4, 2002, demanding that his scenes be removed. The lawsuit was featured in the film. Other film subjects were also apprehensive when the press started reporting about the movie.

Weil alleged in the lawsuit that he had been "tricked" into participating in what he thought would solely be a school project. Wittenborn recalls that when he was questioned by Weil during the filming, he told Weil about his work in film and television, and that they hoped to sell the film to HBO. Johnson recalls Weil constantly vacillated during the making of the movie between being the most enthusiastic film participant, who expressed his ideas for film scenes, to being nervous about the criticism from his friends regarding his participation. Other film subjects also had regrets about participating and some also claimed they were told that it was a student film and thought it would never be seen by a large audience. Johnson denied any deception, saying they all signed releases that were fully explained to them. In a decision dated September 27, 2002, the New York Supreme Court dismissed Weil's lawsuit, ruling that the subject matter of the film was newsworthy, and that the releases Weil had signed in 2000 clearly identified the film as a commercial production.

The film had been submitted to the Sundance Film Festival when the court ruling was reported by the press in October 2002. Changes were apparently made to the film after Weil became incensed after the film's debut at Sundance. Wittenborn remarked on Weil's reaction to the film, "We could have made him [Weil] look worse. We were being kind." Johnson concurred that there was "some reservation on our part in terms of editing". Johnson thought that Weil was "the most honest person in the film", who was "willing to say things...that may reflect what our peers are thinking all the time."

== Release ==
Born Rich was selected for a noncompetition screening at the 2003 Sundance Film Festival, where it was a hit. The film premiered at Sundance on January 19, 2003, in the American Spectrum category. Every seat at the screening was occupied and a couple dozen people were turned away. Sheila Nevins, executive vice president for original programming at HBO, decided to see the film at Sundance when she saw a line around the block for it. An edited version of the film was produced after it was acquired by HBO. In July 2003, it was promoted at the HBO presentation at the Television Critics Association convention in Los Angeles by Johnson and three film subjects.

Johnson was on The Oprah Winfrey Show to discuss Born Rich in a namesake episode that also featured Paris Hilton and Nicky Hilton, two days before HBO's big screen premiere of the film in New York City on October 15, 2003. Five heirs from the film attended the premiere with Johnson. According to Johnson, although Georgina Bloomberg did not attend the opening, she sent him a note afterwards saying she was happy with the film's success and the wide audiences that were able to see it. A week before the premiere, some of Georgina's remarks in the film were reported in a New York Daily News article that included a response from a spokesperson for her father, the then mayor of New York. There were sold-out screenings of the film in New York for weeks. Johnson appeared with S.I. Newhouse IV on Paula Zahn Now on CNN to discuss the film the day before its October 24, 2003 premiere at the Hamptons International Film Festival.

Johnson was also interviewed about the film on CNN Sunday Morning the day before the film's television debut and on NPR's All Things Considered on the day of the television debut on HBO on October 27, 2003. The film was broadcast as part of the HBO's America Undercover series, where it was on a regular rotation. Johnson noted that some film subjects were very supportive of the film and happy about what they said on camera, while other subjects were anxious about the film due to the criticism from friends and family for violating the code of secrecy about wealth. Johnson felt this secrecy about wealth arises from fear of contradicting the belief that their society is a meritocracy, and enables the wealthy to avoid having to justify the power and privilege bestowed by their wealth.

Born Rich was the first of several television shows about the wealthy that fall season. A number of shows on the rich had started airing or were in production. Born Rich was considered more substantive viewing. Johnson believed that the television networks were influenced by the amount of press the film received, as it went to Sundance right before the networks started to develop and market shows for next two television seasons. He also believed the fascination with wealth in popular culture at the time of the release "is deeply influenced by the administration that's running the country." In 2004, Johnson and Cody Franchetti were interviewed about the film on Australia's Channel 9 news show 60 Minutes.

In an Avenue Magazine interview about the film ten years after its release, Johnson said, "Now, reality television about wealth is a staple genre on TV, whereas there wasn't a single show about that at the time...so it had more of an impact and people weren't as guarded." In 2013, Born Rich was alluded to on MSNBC's All In with Chris Hayes where Johnson commented on meritocracy in America on the day Prince George of Wales was born. Born Rich was also broadcast in 2013 on Australia's public television channel ABC2. ABC2 published an update from Johnson where he said that privacy around wealth has recently begun to ease, and that he remains close to at least half of the film's subjects and friendly with all of them. He also noted that now as economies are more globalized, he sees the film as an early step in the growing fascination with family wealth as great fortunes continue to grow in developing economies, e.g., the influx of wealthy families into Australia with the expansion of the Chinese economy.

== Accolades ==
The documentary was nominated for two Emmy Awards in 2004: Outstanding Directing for Nonfiction Programming for Jamie Johnson; and Outstanding Nonfiction Special for Sheila Nevins (executive producer), Dirk Wittenborn (produced by), and Jamie Johnson (producer).
