= Carlo von Zeitschel =

Italian-German art dealer

Carlo von Zeitschel is an Italian-German art dealer, gallery owner and socialite.

He was born to Barbara Zeitschel and Carlo dei baroni Nasi, a grandson of Olympic sailor Carlo Nasi and a great-grandson of Giovanni Agnelli. He has claimed to be both a German baron and Italian viscount. Through his mother, he is a grandson of the German diplomat and Nazi functionary Carltheo Zeitschel, who claimed to be an illegitimate son of German Emperor Wilhelm II.

Zeitschel worked at Morgan Stanley before opening an art gallery, CVZ Contemporary, in Soho in 2004.

He was featured in Jamie Johnson's 2003 documentary Born Rich, which focused on the lives of New York socialites including Ivanka Trump and Georgina Bloomberg. He reportedly disapproved of the documentary's portrayal of him.
