= Carltheo Zeitschel =

German SS officer and Holocaust perpetrator

- Born: 13 March 1893; Augsburg
- Died: 21 April 1945 (aged 52); Berlin, Nazi Germany
- Cause of death: Air raid
- Relatives: Carlo von Zeitschel (grandson)
- Conviction: War crimes
- Penalty: Life imprisonment with hard labor (1954) (in absentia)
- SS service
- Allegiance: Nazi Germany
- Branch: Schutzstaffel
- Rank: Sturmbannfuhrer
- Commands: Jewish Affairs; German Embassy, Paris

Carltheo Zeitschel also Carl Theo, (Note: Also attested in German or English sources or both, are: Carl-Theodor, Carl Theodor, Karl-Theodor, and Karl Theodor.) (13 March 1893 – 21 April 1945), was a German physician, diplomat, Nazi functionary and SS-Sturmbannfuhrer (major).

Instrumental in the Holocaust in France, Zeitschel served as adviser on Jewish affairs (Judenreferent) to the German Embassy in Paris and as such was one of the organisers of the deportations (Note: In early 1942, at the time of the Wannsee Conference, the deportation to the east for compulsory labour deployment became more and more a fiction whereas instant mass murder on arrival became increasingly a reality, thus, in Nazi parlance and in the context of the Final Solution to the Jewish Question, the word “deportation” turned into the disguised and edulcorated synonym of mass murder.) of Jews from occupied France during World War II. Condemned in absentia to forced labour in perpetuity by a French court in 1954, he was actually killed during the bombing of Berlin in 1945.

== Early life and education ==
Born on 13 March 1893 Carltheo Zeitschel was the son of pharmacy owner, Franz Zeitschel, and his wife, Ella van Hees. From 1911, he studied medicine at the University of Freiburg and from 1914 to 1917, during World War I, served as an assistant doctor in the rear area military hospital of Freiburg. He graduated in 1918.

== Interwar period ==
At the end of World War I, Zeitschel was discharged from military service. From 1919 to 1920, he was a member of the Freikorps Reinhard in Berlin, working at the same time as medical assistant at Klinikum im Friedrichshain, the oldest hospital in Berlin. Later, as a full-fledged doctor, he served at various sanatoria in the Black Forest.

A staunch anti-Semite, Zeitschel joined the Nazi Party in 1923. For a decade (1925–35) he served as a naval surgeon. In 1935 he received a positions in Section II – Propaganda and Section VII – British India and the Far East in the Propaganda Ministry. He also served in the colonial policy department at the Nazi Party headquarters.

Towards the end of 1937 he moved to the Foreign Ministry (Auswärtiges Amt or AA), even before Hitler's reshuffle of the Government with the appointment of Joachim von Ribbentrop as foreign minister on 4 February 1938. There he served as legation councilor in the political department. For a brief period in June 1939, he was the German consul in the British colony of Nigeria.

He was a member of the Schutzstaffel (SS) holding the rank of Sturmbannführer (major) while in Paris (1940). According to Roland Ray, Zeitschel served in the military's Secret Field Police.

== World War II ==
When the Germans invaded Poland on 1 September 1939, Zeitschel was ordered to Warsaw, where he participated in the looting of politically valuable documents and art treasures from diplomatic missions, as well neutral states. He was a member of the Sonderkommando Künsberg, the special unit controlled by the Foreign Office and in particular by the Foreign Minister Ribbentrop, which systematically pillaged cultural and art treasures and other items of political interest from the territories occupied by Germany. In 1940 Zeitschel followed the ‘’Sonderkommando Künsberg’’ in its move to the Western Front. In June, with Ribbentrop's authorization, Zeitschel was brought to the German Embassy in Paris by the ambassador Otto Abetz.

Initially, he staffed the Foreign Office liaison desk to the military commander of France. Zeitschel was then tasked by ambassador Abetz to loot and then close the foreign missions in Paris, to plunder Jewish art collections and galleries, and to transfer the booty "to the custody of the German embassy".

=== Desk officer for Jewish Affairs ===
From September 1940, he was promoted as commissioner for Jewish affairs and Masonic affairs liaison with the commander of the state police and the Sicherheitsdienst (SD, Security Service) and was parallel to his career in the diplomatic service. On 5 September 1941, he and Dannecker led the opening in Paris of the exhibition Le Juif et la France (The Jew and France).

As Judenreferent, he was one of the forces behind of the Final Solution in France, the deportation and murder of Jews.

The participation of the German Ambassador in the Jewish measures was necessary, both in unoccupied France with the Vichy government as well as in occupied France. In a document submitted in the Eichmann trial, the close cooperation between the SS intelligence service (SD) in France, with the German embassy comes up with the BdS Helmut Knochen, and Theodor Dannecker as its representative in Paris on the one hand, and on the other hand expressed (Ernst Achenbach, later FDP foreign policy and almost German-EEC Commissioner, takes part here):

In August 1941, Zeitschel put pressure on Abetz, so this is "personally" the commitment caught by Heinrich Himmler, "that the Jews present in the concentration camp can be deported to the East, once this permit transport" and then put the pressure on Dannecker.

Zeitschel was informed in top secret processes and knew about the Wannsee Conference of 20 January 1942. He applied the minutes of the proceedings from junior state secretary Ernst Woermann for the deportation of French Jews. (Note: After 1945, his superiors Ribbentrop, Weizsäcker, Woermann and Abetz denied all knowledge of this fact.)

In the Nuremberg trials a letter by Zeitschel was read:

The Independent Commission of Historians – Foreign Office presented in the book Das Amt 2010, in response to the book clear that the role of the Embassy in Paris and the Foreign Office has been underestimated in driving the Holocaust in France so far. Zeitschel gave Abetz to late summer of 1941 in which he proposed a memorandum on the way to Berlin.

make destruction or sterilization of the European Jews, with the aim that they lose about 33 v. H. their becoming rare by these measures.

==== In Tunis ====
Zeitschel and Rudolf Rahn arrived almost simultaneously at the Tunis bridgehead on 13 November 1942. Rahn was a representative of the Federal Foreign Office of the Afrika Korps from 15 November 1942 to 10 May 1943. He left the bridgehead after Rommel's defeat and the Axis surrender in the Tunisian Campaign in May 1943. In Tunisia the Einsatzkommando of Walter Rauff began on 24 November 1942. On 6 December 1942, Rauff agreed in a meeting with the General Walther Nehring and Rahn, on the use of Jewish forced laborers and instituted a system of labor camps, organized by Theo Saevecke. Vichy France, Italy and the leadership of the Afrika Korps, between which the "zbV envoy" had to convey to Rahn, that the demands of the SS men were rejected in his own words, because otherwise it would have affected Tunisia and Italian Jews.

=== Paris Embassy ===
Until July 1944 Zeitschel was back at the German Embassy in Paris. He also worked out a project for the reorganization of the Paris police in the service of the occupier. After the dissolution of the Embassy in Paris, he was on 1 August 1944, at the headquarters of the SS Oberabschnitts Spree, whose director was Obergruppenführer August Heissmeyer.

== Death and posthumous sentencing ==
Zeitschel was killed in 1945 in a bomb attack in Berlin. The French judiciary sentenced him in 1954 in absentia for his crimes to lifelong forced labor.

During the trial of Abetz, and in the much later judicial proceedings concerning the Jews deported from France, Zeitschel's name was mentioned repeatedly by the defendants and their witnesses to hold him responsible, as a main culprit.

== Sources ==
- Browning, Christopher (2014) [2004]. The Origins Of The Final Solution. London UK: Random House. ISBN 9781448165865. OCLC 897885190.
- Dreyfus, Jean-Marc (2015). L'Impossible Réparation: Déportés, biens spoliés, or nazi, comptes bloqués, criminels de guerre [Impossible Reparation: Deportees, Confiscations, Nazi Gold, Blocked Accounts, Criminals of War] (in French). Flammarion. ISBN 9782081357129. OCLC 938245724.
- Hirschfeld, Gerhard; Marsh, Patrick (1989). Collaboration in France: politics and culture during the Nazi occupation, 1940–44 (Conference publication). New York: Berg. ISBN 978-0-85496-237-2. OCLC 62372520.
- Kapel, Schmuel René [in French] (1986). Un rabbin dans la tourmente (1940–1944): dans les camps d'internement et au sein de l'Organisation juive de combat [A Rabbi in Turmoil: In the Internment Camps and With the Armée Juive] (in French). Paris: Éditions du Centre. ISBN 9782902041022. OCLC 233672340.
- Longerich, Peter (2010). Holocaust – The Nazi Persecution and Murder of the Jews. Oxford University Press. ISBN 978-019280436-5.
- Marrus, Michael Robert; Paxton, Robert O. (1995). Vichy France and the Jews. Stanford University Press. ISBN 9780804724999. OCLC 174555275.
- Seibel, Wolfgang (2016). Persecution and Rescue: The Politics of the "Final Solution" in France, 1940–1944. University of Michigan Press. ISBN 9780472118601.
- Thalmann, Rita (1991). La mise au pas: idéologie et stratégie sécuritaire dans la France occupée [Falling in Line: Ideology and Security Strategy in Occupied France] (in French). Paris: Fayard. ISBN 9782213026237. OCLC 243706428.

(in German)

- Browning, Christopher (2006) [2004]. Die Entfesselung der "Endlösung" Nationalsozialistische Judenpolitik 1939–1942 [Origins of the Final Solution: Evolution of Nazi Jewish Policy 1939–1942]. Berlin: Propyläen. ISBN 3-549-07187-6.
- Brunner, Bernhard (2004). Der Frankreich-Komplex: die nationalsozialistischen Verbrechen in Frankreich und die Justiz der Bundesrepublik Deutschland [The France-Complex: Nazi Crimes in France and Justice in the German Federal Republic]. Göttingen: Wallstein Verlag. ISBN 978-3-89244-693-4. OCLC 469551351.
- Conze, Eckart; Frei, Norbert; Hayes, Peter; Zimmermann, Moshe (2010). Das Amt und die Vergangenheit: Deutsche Diplomaten im Dritten Reich und in der Bundesrepublik [The Ministry and the Past: German Diplomats in the Third Reich and in the Federal Republic]. Collaborators: Annette Weinke and Andrea Wiegeshoff (3rd ed.). Karl Blessing Verlag. ISBN 978-3-641-05091-7. OCLC 770555988. (Note: "Das Amt, here translated as "The Ministry", refers to the German Foreign Office (Auswärtige Amt or AA).)
- Isphording, Bernd; Keiper, Gerhard; Kröger, Martin (2000). Biographisches Handbuch des deutschen Auswärtigen Dienstes 1871–1945: Band 5: T–Z [Biographical Handbook of the German External Action Service 1871–1945 Vol. 5 T-Z]. Paderborn, Munich: F. Schöningh. ISBN 978-3-506-71844-0. OCLC 634251508.
- Klarsfeld, Serge (1977). Die Endlösung der Judenfrage in Frankreich: deutsche Dokumente 1941–1944 [Final Soluiton of the Jewish Question: German Documents 1941-1944]. Paris: Center of Contemporary Jewish Documentation. OCLC 464804159.
- Klarsfeld, Serge; Meyer, Ahlrich (2007) [1989]. Vichy – Auschwitz: Die "Endlösung der Judenfrage" in Frankreich [Vichy - Auschwitz: the "Final Solution of the Jewish Question"]. Veröffentlichungen der Forschungsstelle Ludwigsburg der Universität Stuttgart (New ed.). Darmstadt: Wissenschaftliche Buchgesellschaft (WBG). ISBN 978-3-534-20793-0. OCLC 315262755.
- Klee, Ernst (2003). Das Personenlexikon zum Dritten Reich : wer war was vor und nach 1945? [Biographical Dictionary of the Third Reich. Who's Who Before and After 1945?]. Frankfurt am Main: S. Fischer. ISBN 978-3-1003-9309-8.
- Mayer, Michael (2010). Staaten als Täter. Ministerialbürokratie und "Judenpolitik" in NS-Deutschland und Vichy-Frankreich. Ein Vergleich [States As Perpetrators: Ministerial Bureaucracy and "Jewish Policy" in Nazi Germany and Vichy France, A Comparison]. Munich: R. Oldenbourg. ISBN 978-3-486-58945-0. OCLC 690825237.
- Meyer, Ahlrich [in German] (2005). Täter im Verhör: die "Endlösung der Judenfrage" in Frankreich 1940–1944 [Examining the Perpetrator: the "Final Solution to the Jewish Question" in France 1940–1944]. Darmstadt: Wissenschaftliche Buchgesellschaft. ISBN 978-3-534-17564-2. OCLC 799585583.
- Poliakov, Léon; Wulf, Joseph (1989). Das Dritte Reich und seine Diener [The Third Reich and Their Servants]. Wiesbaden: Fourier. ISBN 3-925037-45-4. OCLC 26449078.
- Ray, Roland (2000) [1989]. Annäherung an Frankreich im Dienste Hitlers? Otto Abetz und die deutsche Frankreichpolitik 1930–1942. Munich: Oldenbourg Verlag. ISBN 3-486-56495-1. OCLC 845897545.
- Thalmann, Rita (1999) [1st pub. 1991 in French]. Gleichschaltung in Frankreich 1940–1944 [Falling In Line: France 1940–1944]. Translated by Eva Groepler. Hamburg: Europäische Verlagsanstalt. ISBN 9783434500629. OCLC 43038151.
