= Fierce People =

Fierce people may be:

- a description formerly associated with the Yanomami people of the Amazon
- Fierce People (film), a 2005 film
