= Jamie Johnson (filmmaker) =

American heir, filmmaker, and socialite (born 1979)

- Born: James Wittenborn Johnson; 1979 (age 46–47)
- Education: Pingry School; New York University (B.A., 2003)
- Occupations: Filmmaker, socialite, journalist, fashion designer

James Wittenborn Johnson (born 1979) is an American heir, filmmaker, and socialite. He is a great-grandson of Robert Wood Johnson I (co-founder of Johnson & Johnson). He has also worked as a journalist and as a fashion designer.

== Early life ==
Jamie Johnson was born in 1979 to Johnson & Johnson heir James Loring Johnson, son of John Seward Johnson I, and Gretchen Wittenborn Johnson, sister of screenwriter and novelist Dirk Wittenborn. Johnson grew up with his four older sisters and a brother on a New Jersey estate. The family also had residences in East Hampton, New York and Jupiter Island, Florida.

He graduated from Pingry School, a preparatory school in Martinsville, New Jersey. He graduated with a B.A. from the Gallatin School at New York University in 2003, where he studied Medieval history, American history, and filmmaking.

== Career ==
=== Filmmaking ===
In 2003, his documentary film Born Rich premiered at the Sundance Film Festival. It discussed his experience, as well as the experiences of ten other young heirs, of growing up with inherited wealth. There were sold-out screenings of the film in New York City for weeks. The film was broadcast on television by HBO, as part of its America Undercover series. Johnson received two Emmy Award nominations for the film, in 2004: Outstanding Directing for Nonfiction Programming, and Outstanding Nonfiction Special; with Johnson receiving the latter nomination as a producer.

In 2006, Johnson's second film, The One Percent, premiered at the TriBeCa Film Festival. The documentary examines the system that allows a growing wealth gap in America, focusing on the one percent of Americans who control 40 percent of the country's wealth. The film featured Robert Reich, Bill Gates Sr., Milton Friedman, and many others coming from various socioeconomic strata, including residents of Chicago's Cabrini–Green housing project and Hurricane Katrina victims. The film premiered on television on HBO's Cinemax in 2008.

=== Television appearances and cameo roles ===
In 2003, Johnson was interviewed on The Oprah Winfrey Show about Born Rich in a namesake episode that also featured Paris Hilton and Nicky Hilton. He was also interviewed about the documentary on Paula Zahn Now on CNN and CNN Sunday Morning before the film's television debut on HBO. In 2004, he was interviewed about the film on 60 Minutes on Australia's Channel 9.

In 2006, he was on Oprah discussing The One Percent in an episode on "Class in America", along with Nicole Buffett, who was in the film. Warren Buffett's disowning of Nicole shortly after the interview garnered media attention and was included in the HBO version of the documentary. In 2008, Johnson was interviewed about the film on The Early Show on CBS on the day of the film's television debut on HBO.

Johnson was on Oprah in 2009 discussing how the recession affects rich families in an episode about the declining American middle class. The wealth gap widened in the Great Recession that occurred after the 2006 episode on social class, where Johnson stated that historians always list a growing wealth gap among the reasons for the decline of great civilizations. In 2013, Johnson commented on meritocracy in America on All In with Chris Hayes on MSNBC on the day Prince George was born.

In 2011, he had a cameo role as himself on Gossip Girl. In 2012, he had a cameo role as Julie's suitor in Arbitrage.

=== Writing ===
From 2008 to 2011, Johnson wrote an online weekly column for Vanity Fair titled "The One Percent" on various perspectives, practices, and issues of the wealthy. He wrote an article titled "The One Percent" for The Huffington Post in 2008. In 2014, he wrote for The New York Times about a White House summit for 100 young philanthropists and heirs to billionaire family fortunes where he was an invitee.

=== Fashion ===
In 2010, Johnson launched a high-end fashion collection called Black Sweater. The clothing line was launched at Bergdorf Goodman in 2011. He started by making garments for friends and family after friends commented on custom clothing he had designed for himself.

== Filmography ==
Year	Title	Role	Notes
2003	Born Rich	Director, co-producer	
2006	The One Percent	Director, co-producer	
2011	Gossip Girl	Cameo as himself	Season 5, Episode 3 - "The Jewel of Denial"
2012	Arbitrage	Cameo as Julie's suitor	
