= Pharmakon (disambiguation) =

Pharmakon is a composite concept introduced by Jacques Derrida denoting remedy, poison, and scapegoat, based on his reading of Plato's Phaedrus.

Pharmakon may also refer to:

- Pharmakon—Danish College of Pharmacy Practice, a university college situated in the city of Hillerød on the island of Zealand in Denmark
- Pharmakon (novel), a 2008 novel by Dirk Wittenborn
- Pharmakon (film), a 2012 Albanian film
- Pharmakon (music), a solo industrial noise project by Margaret Chardiet

== See also ==
- Pharmakos, Ancient Greek religion
- Farmakon, Finnish band
- Farmakon, album by Finnish band Skepticism
- Drug
- Pharmakom, a company in the Johnny Mnemonic (film).
