= Judenberater =

Nazi death camp staff members

The Judenberater or Judenreferent (German plural: Judenberater; Judenreferenten), variously translated as "Jew advisers" or "Jew experts", were Nazi SS officials who supervised anti-Jewish legislation and the deportations of Jews in the countries under their responsibility. Key architects of the Holocaust, most of them were under the direct command of Adolf Eichmann.

== Role ==
The Judenreferent was not an "adviser" in the literal sense of the term, as he was deployed exclusively in allied or occupied states to promote anti-Jewish measures and their deportations, and was a direct participant in anti-Jewish activities before and during World War II.

In France and several other countries defeated by Germany, the Jewish advisers were subject to the disciplinary command of the Sicherheitspolizei. In allied countries such as Bulgaria and Romania, they were subordinate to the police attaché (Polizeiattaché) or the German ambassador. The "Jewish advisers" of the SS received their instructions exclusively from the Eichmannreferat, who kept himself up to date through "regular activity reports and briefings on their actions".

According to Claudia Steur, the Judenberater can be divided into two groups: those like Dannecker, Wisliceny, Brunner, Boßhammer and Abromeit were close confidants of Adolf Eichmann and served as role models for the other "Jewish advisors". The remaining ones were initiated relatively late in the Final Solution, and their "striving for power, prestige and social advancement" was an important motive for their later participation in the Holocaust.

German policy was to involve allied governments in the persecution of Jews in order to make them complicit in the Holocaust.

== List ==
- Belgium: Victor Humpert (1941), Kurt Asche (1941–42), Fritz Erdmann (1942–43), Felix Weidmann (1943–44), Werner Borchardt (1944)
- Bulgaria: Theodor Dannecker (1942–43)
- Croatia: Franz Abromeit (1942–44)
- France: Carltheo Zeitschel (1940–42), Theodor Dannecker (1940–42), Heinz Röthke (1942), Alois Brunner (1943–44)
- Germany: Leopold von Mildenstein (1934–36) and Herbert Hagen (1937–39) were two of those who held the title of Judenreferent in Nazi Germany, under the overall command of Reinhard Heydrich.
- Greece: Dieter Wisliceny (1943), Alois Brunner (1943), Anton Burger (1944)
- Hungary: Adolf Eichmann, Dieter Wisliceny, Theodor Dannecker, Franz Abromeit, Hermann Krumey, Otto Hunsche (1944–45)
- Italy: Theodor Dannecker (1943–44), Friedrich Boßhammer (1944–45)
- Netherlands: Wilhelm Zoepf (1941–43)
- Romania: Otto von Bolschwing (1940–41), Gustav Richter (1941–44)
- Slovakia: Dieter Wisliceny (1940–44), Alois Brunner (1944–45)
- Tunisia: Carltheo Zeitschel (1942), Walter Rauff (1942–43)

== Perpetrators ==
Most of the perpetrators, who later rose to become "Judenberater" (advisers to the Jews), were born between 1905 and 1913, had joined the NSDAP before 1933, did not find a secure position until they joined the SS, and quickly advanced to positions of power. They "slowly grew into a role that became increasingly brutal, which they then, without doubting the appropriateness of the orders given to them, carried out diligently and consistently until the end of the war."

== Works cited ==
- Steuer, Claudia (2000). "Eichmanns Emissäre. Die Judenberater in Hitlers Europa". In Paul, Gerhard; Mallmann, Klaus-Michael (eds.). Die Gestapo im Zweiten Weltkrieg: "Heimatfront" und besetztes Europa. Darmstadt: Primus. p. 403. ISBN 978-3534144778. OCLC 45542716.
