= Franz Abromeit =

German SS officer (1907–1964)

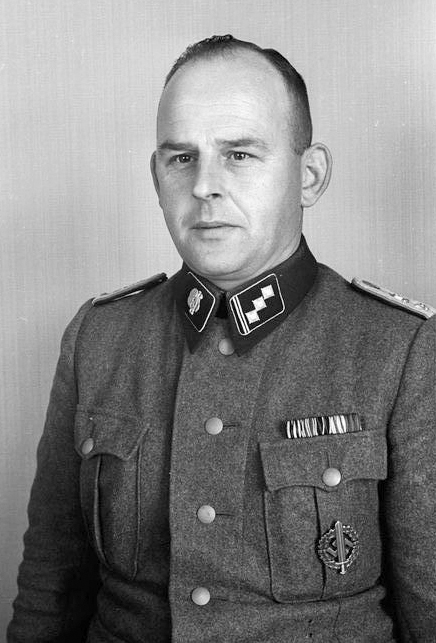
- Franz in KZ Mauthausen
- Born: 8 August 1907; Tilsit, Kingdom of Prussia, German Empire (now Sovetsk, Kaliningrad Oblast)
- Died: 30 June 1964 (aged 56); Republic of Egypt
- Military career
- Allegiance: Nazi Germany
- Branch: Schutzstaffel
- Service years: 1937–1945
- Rank: SS-Hauptsturmführer
- Conflicts: World War II

Franz Abromeit (8 August 1907 – 30 June 1964) was an SS officer and worked in the Reich Security Main Office (RSHA). He was guilty of war crimes against Jews, but escaped from Germany at the end of World War II in Europe. In 1964 he was declared dead.

== Biography ==
Abromeit was born in Tilsit, and in his youth he was a leather merchant. Abromeit joined the Nazi Party (member number 329,305) and the SS (member number 272,353). In 1937 he was promoted in rank to SS-Untersturmführer, in 1938 SS-Obersturmführer and in 1940 SS-Hauptsturmführer. From 1939 to 1941 he served as head of the SD-Special Section for the Evacuation of Poles and Jews that forced resettlement from Danzig and West Prussia.

From 1942 he was Jewish adviser to Croatia in the Jewish Section (IVB4) of the Reich Security Main Office (RSHA) under SS-Obersturmbannführer Adolf Eichmann. 5,500 Jews were deported and most murdered. In 1944 he was employed with Eichmann, Dieter Wisliceny, Theodor Dannecker, Hermann Krumey, Siegfried Seidl, and Franz Novak in Hungary, to oversee the deportation of Jews in the concentration camps at Auschwitz. Over 430,000 Jews were deported from Hungary, of whom some 200,000 were murdered upon arrival. Abromeit was one of the closest stewards under Eichmann.

He escaped Germany as World War II in Europe came to an end and was believed to have gone to Egypt. In 1964 he was declared dead.

== Literature ==
- Ernst Klee: Das Personenlexikon zum Dritten Reich; S. Fischer, Frankfurt am Main 2003, ISBN 3-10-039309-0
