= Austrian SS =

Portion of the Schutzstaffel membership from Austria

The Austrian SS was the portion of the Schutzstaffel (SS) membership from Austria. The term and title was used unofficially. They were never officially recognized as a separate branch of the SS. Austrian SS members were seen as regular personnel and they served in every branch of the SS.

== History ==
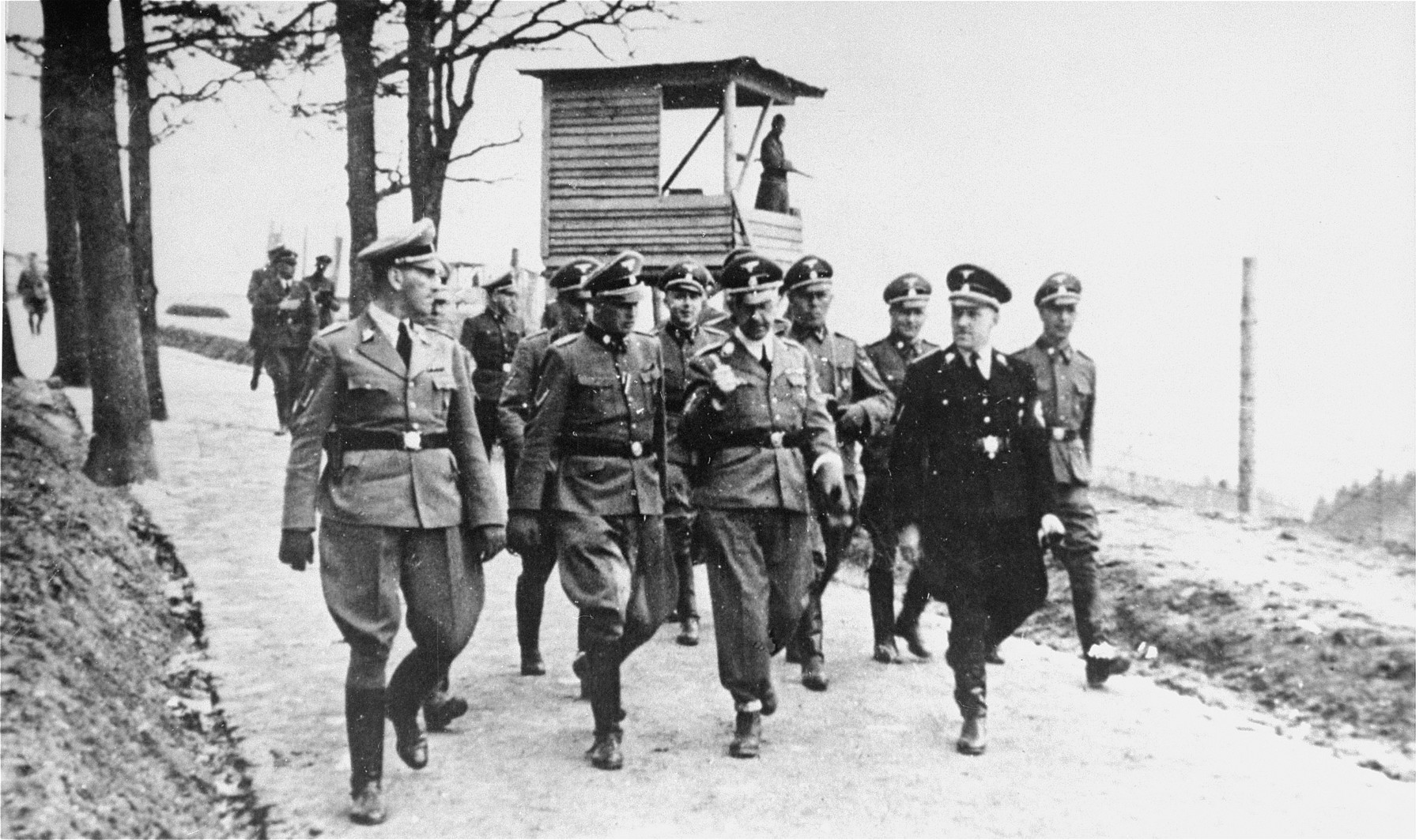
With Kaltenbrunner (on the far left), Heinrich Himmler talks to camp commander, Franz Ziereis, during an official visit to Mauthausen concentration camp in 1941. Austrian Gauleiter August Eigruber (wearing a pre-war Allgemeine SS uniform) accompanies them along with other SS officials.

The term "Austrian SS" is often used to describe that portion of the SS membership from Austria, but it was never a recognized branch of the SS. In contrast to SS members from other countries, who were grouped into either the Germanic-SS or the Foreign Legions of the Waffen-SS, Austrian SS members were regular SS personnel. It was technically under the command of the SS in Germany, but often acted independently concerning Austrian affairs. The Austrian SS was founded in 1930 and, by 1934, was acting as a covert force to bring about the Anschluss with Germany, which occurred in March 1938. Early Austrian SS leaders were Ernst Kaltenbrunner and Arthur Seyss-Inquart.

Austrian SS men were organized in the same manner as the Allgemeine-SS, but operated as an underground organization, in particular after 1936 when the Austrian government declared the SS an illegal organization. Kaltenbrunner, for example, repeatedly made trips to Bavaria to consult with Himmler and Heydrich. Hiding on a train and on a ship that traveled to Passau, he would return with money and orders for Austrian comrades. Kaltenbrunner was arrested for a second time in 1937, by Austrian authorities on charges of being head of the illegal Nazi Party organisation in Upper Austria. He was released in September. One of the largest formations of the Austrian SS was the 11th SS-Standarte operating out of Vienna.

After 1938, when Austria was annexed by Germany, the Austrian SS was folded into SS-Oberabschnitt Donau with the 3rd regiment of the SS-Verfugungstruppe, Der Führer, and the fourth Totenkopf regiment, Ostmark, recruited in Austria shortly thereafter. Mauthausen was the first concentration camp opened in Austria following the Anschluss. Starting with a single camp at Mauthausen, the complex expanded over time and by the summer of 1940 Mauthausen had become one of the largest labour camp complexes in the German-controlled part of Europe, with four main subcamps at Mauthausen and nearby Gusen, and nearly 100 other subcamps located throughout Austria and southern Germany, directed from a central office at Mauthausen.

In Vienna, the Hotel Metropole was transformed into Gestapo headquarters in April 1938. With a staff of 900 (80 per cent of whom were recruited from the Austrian police), it was the largest Gestapo office outside of Berlin. An estimated 50,000 people were interrogated or tortured there. Thereafter, the people would be deported to concentration camps throughout the German Reich. The Gestapo in Vienna was headed by Franz Josef Huber, who also served as chief of the Central Agency for Jewish Emigration in Vienna. Although its de facto leaders were Adolf Eichmann and later Alois Brunner, Huber was still responsible for the mass deportation of Austrian Jews.

Austrian SS members served in every branch of the SS, including Nazi concentration camps, Einsatzgruppen, and the Security Services. Political scientist David Art of Tufts University notes that Austrians comprised 8 per cent of the Third Reich's population and 13 percent of the SS; he states that 40 per cent of the staff and 75 per cent of commanders at death camps were Austrian. Besides Eichmann, who was one of the major organisers of the Holocaust, Amon Göth was another infamous Austrian-SS member. He became the commandant of the Kraków-Płaszów concentration camp in Płaszów (who was portrayed in the film Schindler's List by Ralph Fiennes).

== See also ==
- August Eigruber
- August Meyszner
- Wilhelm Höttl
- Otto Skorzeny
