= Carlo Nasi =

Italian sailor

Personal information
- Full name: Carlo Nasi
- Nationality: Italian
- Born: 19 September 1877 Turin, Italy
- Died: 29 January 1935 (aged 57)
- Spouse: Aniceta Caterina Agnelli
- Relative: Carlo von Zeitschel (grandson)

Sailing career
- Sport: Sailing
- Class: 6 Metre
- Updated on 6 March 2015

Carlo dei baroni Nasi (19 September 1877 – 29 January 1935) was a sailor from Italy, who represented his country at the 1924 Summer Olympics in Le Havre, France. He married Aniceta Caterina (1889–1928) of the Agnelli family. She was daughter of Giovanni Agnelli, the founder of the Fiat automobile empire.

== Sources ==
- "Carlo Nasi Bio, Stats, and Results". Olympic Sports. Sports-Reference.com. Archived from the original on 18 April 2020.
- Les Jeux de la VIIIe Olympiade Paris 1924:rapport official (PDF) (in French). Paris: Librairie de France: Comité Olympique Français. 1924. Archived from the original (PDF) on 21 April 2013.
