= The One Percent (film) =

- Directed by: Jamie Johnson
- Written by: Jamie Johnson; Nick Kurzon
- Produced by: Jamie Johnson; Nick Kurzon
- Cinematography: Nick Kurzon
- Edited by: Matthew Hamachek; Nick Kurzon; Michael Levine
- Music by: Robert Miller
- Production companies: Wise and Good Films, LLC
- Release date: April 29, 2006 (Tribeca Film Festival)
- Running time: 76 minutes (television)
- Country: United States
- Language: English

The One Percent is a 2006 documentary about the growing wealth gap between the wealthy elite compared to the overall citizenry in the United States. It was created by Jamie Johnson, an heir to the Johnson & Johnson fortune, and produced by Jamie Johnson and Nick Kurzon. The film's title refers to the top one percent of Americans in terms of wealth, who controlled 42.2 percent of total financial wealth in 2004.

The film premiered on April 29, 2006, at the Tribeca Film Festival. A revised version of the film incorporating footage shot since the 2006 festival screening premiered on February 21, 2008, on HBO's Cinemax.

== Interviews ==
The film is 76 minutes long and features interviews with a diverse range of individuals:

- Nicole Buffett – Adopted daughter of Warren Buffett's son Peter from a previous marriage. Warren disowned her shortly after she appeared on Oprah with Johnson to discuss the film in 2006. The disownment received attention in the media and was discussed in the documentary when it aired on HBO's Cinemax in 2008. By 2022, she and Warren had reconciled.
- Chuck Collins – Estate tax proponent, author, and great-grandson of Oscar Mayer
- Steve Forbes – CEO of Forbes, Inc., former presidential candidate, proponent of a flat tax, and son of Malcolm Forbes
- Cody Franchetti – Italian baron, and heir to Milliken & Company
- Milton Friedman – Economist, and Nobel Laureate: 1976 winner of the Nobel Memorial Prize in Economic Sciences. Friedman abruptly ends the interview after accusing Johnson of advocating socialism.
- Bill Gates Sr. – Father of Microsoft Founder Bill Gates, and opponent of an estate tax repeal
- Michael Hakim – real estate heir and Beverly Hills City Council candidate
- James Hughes Jr. – Family wealth advisor
- Eddie Bernice Johnson – Former Chair of the Congressional Black Caucus
- Gretchen Johnson – Jamie Johnson's mother
- James Johnson – Jamie Johnson's father
- Adnan Khashoggi – International arms merchant
- Claude R. Kirk Jr. – Former governor of Florida
- Greg Kushner – Lido Wealth Conference Director
- John Lewis – U.S. Representative from Georgia
- Roy O. Martin – President of the Louisiana-based Martin Lumber Company
- Brian McNally – The Johnson family's financial advisor (asset manager)
- Dan Miller – Former U.S. Representative from Florida
- Karl Muth – Investment banking heir
- Ralph Nader – Consumer advocate and former presidential candidate
- Larry Noble – OpenSecrets
- Paul Orfalea – Founder of Kinko's
- Kevin Phillips – Former Republican Party strategist
- Jimmie Price – Taxi driver
- Nathaniel P. Reed – Undersecretary of The Interior, from 1967-1973
- Robert Reich – Former U.S. Secretary of Labor
- Greg Schell – Attorney, Migrant Farmer Justice Program
- Edward Wolff – Professor of Economics, New York University

== See also ==
- Occupy Wall Street
- We are the 99%
