= Albert Hartl =

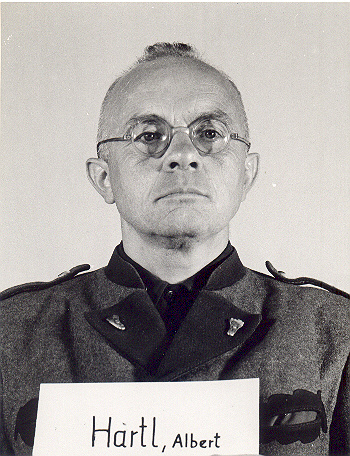
Albert Hartl at the Nuremberg trials, 1945–1946

Albert Hartl (13 November 1904 – 14 December 1982) was a former Catholic priest in Germany who joined the National Socialist German Workers' Party (Nazi Party) in 1933 and the Sicherheitsdienst (SD, an intelligence agency) the following year.

== Early life and education ==
Hartl studied for the priesthood from 1916 to 1929 at a seminary in Freising and the Ludwig-Maximilians-Universität München. He was ordained in 1929 by the Archbishop of Munich Cardinal Michael von Faulhaber and began teaching, including at the Freising seminary.

== Career with SD ==
While teaching at Friesing, Hartl became involved with a group of priests who had joined the Nazi Party, and in 1933 he signed up as a paid SD informant. He reported Father Josef Rossberger, apparently his best friend, for anti-Nazi activity, which led to Rossberger's trial and imprisonment, and Hartl becoming a protégé of Reinhard Heydrich, head of the SD. Consequently, Hartl renounced the priesthood and joined the SD himself. In 1935, according to Gitta Sereny, he became the SD's Chief of Church Information, and was tasked with the collection of information about party members that had close association with the church and collecting information from them. In March 1941, when the Reich Security Head Office was reorganized, he was placed in charge of a Gestapo office known as IV B ("Sects"). Department IV B4, led by Adolf Eichmann, was the office responsible for the deportation of Jews outside Poland.

== Works cited ==
- Alvarez, David; Graham, Robert A. (2003). Nothing Sacred: Nazi Espionage Against the Vatican, 1939–1945. London and Portland: Frank Cass. ISBN 0-7146-4302-5.
- Hilberg, Raul (2003). The Destruction of the European Jews. Vol. II (3rd ed.). New Haven and London: Yale University Press. ISBN 0-300-09587-2.
- Longerich, Peter (2012). Heinrich Himmler. New York: Oxford University Press. ISBN 978-0-19-959232-6.
- Sereny, Gitta (1995) [1974]. Into That Darkness: From Mercy Killing to Mass Murder. London: Pimlico. ISBN 978-0-7126-7447-8.
