= Friedrich Boßhammer =

German SS and Judenreferent

Friedrich Robert Boßhammer
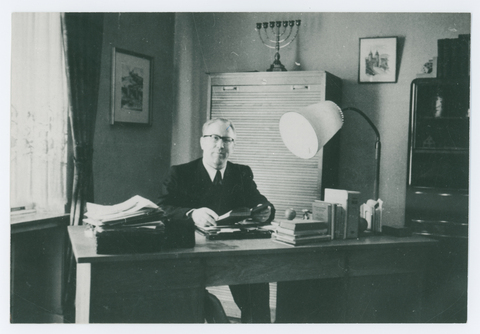
- Friedrich Boßhammer in 1944
- Born: 20 December 1906; Opladen, German Empire
- Died: 17 December 1972 (aged 65); West Berlin
- Military career
- Allegiance: Nazi Germany
- Branch: Schutzstaffel
- Rank: SS-Sturmbannführer (Major)

Friedrich Robert Boßhammer (1906–1972) was a German jurist, SS-Sturmbannführer and close associate of Adolf Eichmann, responsible for the deportation of the Italian Jews to extermination camps from January 1944 until the end of the war in Europe. He was arrested in West Germany in 1968 and stood trial. Boßhammer was convicted and sentenced to life imprisonment in April 1972 for his involvement in the deportation of 3,300 Jews from Italy, but died before he could serve time in prison.

== Biography ==
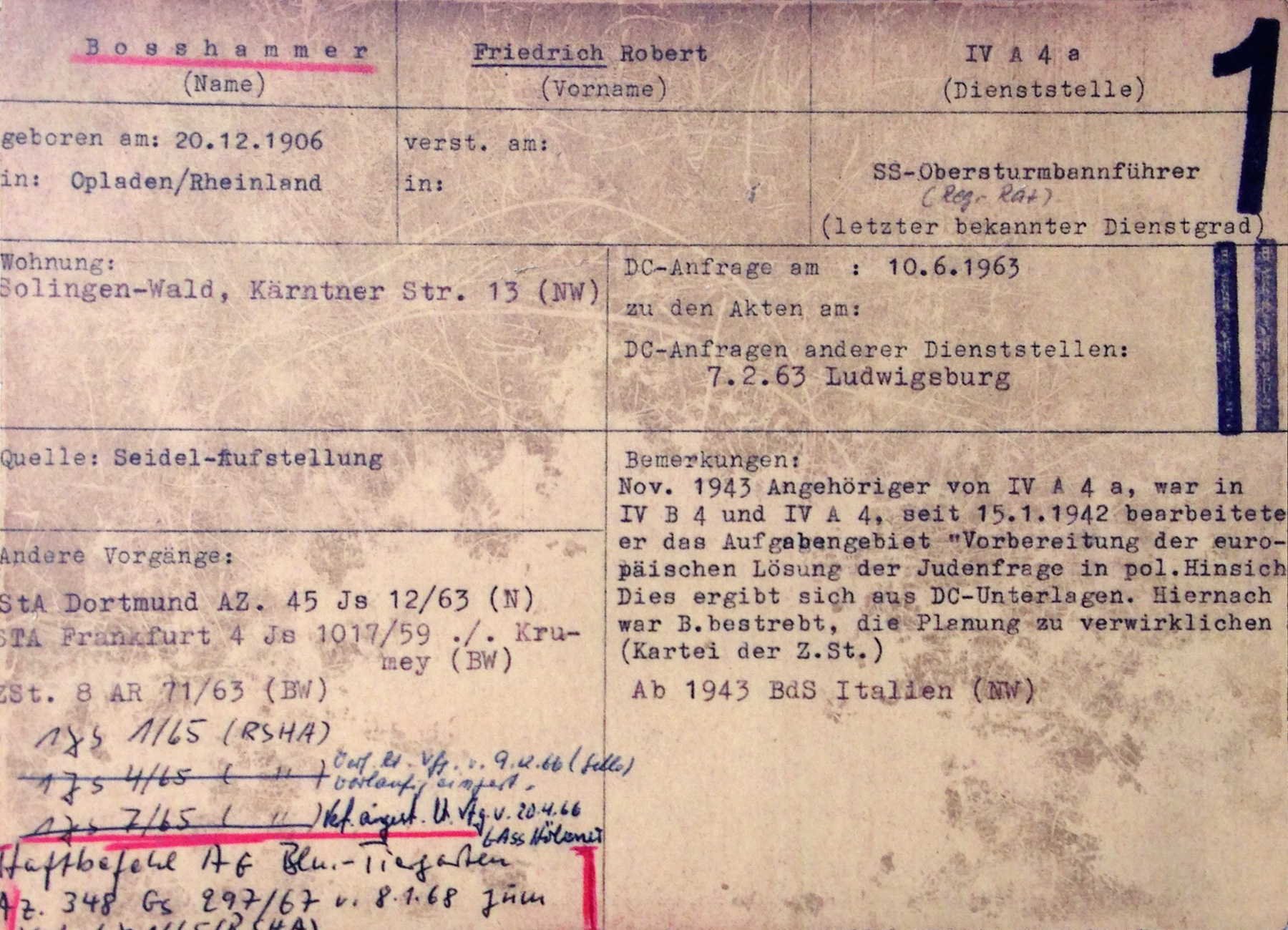
Index card for Boßhammer during RSHA investigations conducted after World War II (Topography of Terror museum, Berlin)

Boßhammer studied law in Cologne and Heidelberg, taking his first and second State examination in 1931 and 1935.

Boßhammer joined the Nazi Party in 1933 and the Schutzstaffel (SS) in 1937. He worked for the Gestapo in Wiesbaden and Kassel before becoming a close associate of Adolf Eichmann in 1942, when he became involved in the Final Solution, the genocide on the Jews.

Boßhammer was a convinced anti-Semite who saw Jews as sub-humans and fully supported the work of the Einsatzgruppen. Before his transfer to Italy, when the possibility arose that Bulgaria could allow 8,000 Jews to emigrate, he demanded that this had to be stopped. He was actively involved in attempts to pressure Bulgaria, Romania and Italy into a harder line against the Jews and to deport their Jewish population to German camps.

From January 1942, Boßhammer was a member of the Jewish Section in the Reich Security Main Office, where he was responsible for the section "Preparation of the European solution to the Jewish problem in political regard", and was considered a specialist in regards to the deportation of Jews. German historian Carlo Gentile evaluated him as "one of the men best informed about the Final solution process.

In January 1944, he replaced Theodor Dannecker in the Judenreferat of the Sicherheitsdienst (SD) in Verona, Italy, a role that involved the deportation of the Italian Jews to extermination camps. Contrary to earlier agreements with Fascist Italy, in which Boßhammer and his staff were only to assist the Italians in the persecution of Jews, he took a lead role, making his organisation a centralised department that coordinated all German and Italian resources available for the arrests and deportations of the Italian Jews. Boßhammer operated independently of the Fascist authorities and rarely consulted them, the exception being a meeting with Giovanni Preziosi, one of the few true anti-semitists in the Fascist Government, who later served as the General Inspectorate of Race in the RSI.

Boßhammer received an official recommendation and the War Merit Cross, Second Class with Swords, for his work in Italy, stating that "Boßhammer has led the fight against the Jews in the Italian region since February 1944. In so doing, he has performed noteworthy work in the service of the Final Solution to the Jewish problem and has personally distinguished himself in numerous actions against Jews". At the end of 1944 he decided to evacuate the camp of Fossoli to the new camp of Gries (Bozen) due to an air bombing.

=== Post-war ===
Boßhammer disappeared at the end of the war in 1945 and subsequently worked as a lawyer in Wuppertal. He was arrested in West Germany in 1968 and eventually sentenced to life in prison for his involvement in the deportation of 3,300 Jews from Italy to Auschwitz. During the Holocaust almost 8,000 of the 45,000 Jews living in Italy perished. During his trial, over 200 witnesses were heard before he was sentenced in April 1972. He died a few months after the verdict without having spent any time in prison.

One of the witnesses at the trial was Italian writer Primo Levi, an Auschwitz survivor.
