= Pharmakon (novel) =

2008 novel by Dirk Wittenborn

- Author: Dirk Wittenborn
- Language: English
- Publication date: 2008

Pharmakon is a 2008 novel written by the author Dirk Wittenborn. Though fictional, it was greatly influenced by Wittenborn's relationship with his father, who was a psychopharmacologist.

== Structure ==
The novel has three different parts. Book One concerns a psychologist, Will Friedrich, in the competitive Yale psychology department of the 1950s and his pursuit of an anti-depressant and the serious effects it has on a student. "Book Two" occurs seven years later and is told from the perspective of Will's newborn son, Zach, who is eventually kidnapped by the student (who had apparently murdered one of Friedrich's sons). Book Three followed a grown-up Zach, now recovering from drug addiction, as he tries to piece his life together and figure out what has happened to his family.

== Plot summary ==
The novel Pharmakon is divided into three parts. The first part of the novel, titled "Book 1", takes place in the 1950s and centers around Will Friedrich; a middle aged, nontenured professor of psychology at Yale University. Though extremely smart and known around campus for his ability to take a set of data and "calculate the standard deviation in his head", Will is having a hard time figuring out an idea to climb the social ladder into the upper circles of the Yale elite. This all changes when Will overhears Dr. Bunny Winton about an exotic plant called "gai kau dong" or, "The Way Home". She describes how this plant has been used by a native tribe in New Guinea to calm people after traumatic events. He and Winton begin testing on the same plants used by the New Guinea tribe. After isolating the active ingredient in the plant, Winton and Friedrich test the drug on rats and experience positive results.

One of their test subjects, Casper Gedsic, is originally described as a "bearded with pimples and peach fuzz, too shy to look a person in the eye." almost immediately begins to see a change; Casper's new found confidence enables him to clean up his appearance and befriend Whitney Bouchard, a rich, Yale football player.

After the drug trial concludes, Friedrich received a call from an intoxicated Whitney, talking about how Casper had changed ever since he stopped taking his medication and how he had created a list of everybody he blamed for his current state of despair, with Friedrich and Dr. Winton being at the top. Casper appears at Friedrich's house while Will was outside with his wife and children. With a gun at his side, Casper begins to approach, but then changes his mind and leaves.

The police arrive at Winton's home to see that Bunny Winton had been shot dead and her husband had been beaten in paralysis. The police immediately rush back to Friedrich's house to protect him and his family in case Casper came back. As Friedrich was talking to the police and everybody was speculating why Casper may have left them alone at first, Will's youngest son, Jack, is found drowned in a birdbath in the garden outside.

"Book II" begins approximately seven years after the conclusion of the first part. Will Friedrich has moved his family away from the New England area to Rutgers University in New Jersey in an attempt to start over away from the Casper incident. Casper was sentenced to a lengthy term in the Connecticut State Hospital for the criminally insane.

The rest of the story is told from Zach's perspective. At one point, young Zach is left home under the care of his irresponsible older sister, and, while setting up a lemonade stand, Casper arrives and takes Zach to a remote lake for "swimming lessons", and allows Zach to fall into the water. Zach begins to drown, but Casper saves him and brings him home.

Casper had recently escaped from the mental hospital with plans on exacting revenge on Will Friendrich. After all these years, Casper was convinced that it was Friedrich's fault that he felt depressed again once he stopped taking "The Way Home". When Zach gets dropped off at his house, his parents are frantically searching for him with help from the police. They soon are able to realize that it was Casper who had taken Zach "swimming", but they are dumbfounded on why he would let Zach live. After about a week of searching by the police, they are finally able to track down Casper once again and place him in a higher security mental hospital, which he never escapes from for the remainder of his life.

Though Zach was relatively safe, this event traumatized him for the rest of his life. "Book 3" begins 21 years after Zach goes to college, going through cocaine withdrawal. The reader learns that Zach dropped out of Yale and moved to Los Angeles to become a screenwriter. He hasn't talked to a majority of his family for years, especially his parents. His attempt at making contact goes horribly awry when his father sees him and recoils, thinking that Zach is just there to rob them. This enrages Zach and he storms off and goes to live with an old friend in the city, never speaking to his parents again.

The book ends with Will lying in bed at night, trying to cry because he knows the therapeutic values of tears, but he is unable to. After all the anti-depressants he had helped make during his lifetime, he wonders if there is any way somebody can prescribe tears.

== Critical reception ==
Pharmakon has received mostly positive reviews from critics. Janet Maslin of The New York Times describes Pharmakon as "a smart, eccentric coming-of-age story about an entire culture's maturation process, not just one about the workings of a single family." The Seattle Times writer Mark Lindquist declared Pharmakon as "a smart, pharmaceutical pick-me-up."

Though there are multiple good reviews, there have also been some negative ones. Due to the somewhat disjointed way the story was written, some critics found it a bit hectic. David Daley of USA Today said that the novel was "moments of genius, surrounded by confusion and bloat." Other critics, such as Lionel Shriver of The Telegraph, felt that the story started off great, that it started to lag towards the second half making it "almost a wonderful novel."
