= 11th SS-Standarte =

The 11th SS-Standarte was a large regimental formation of the Allgemeine-SS and the principal mustering SS unit in Austria. First formed in 1932, the Standarte was headquartered in Vienna and during its first years of existence served as a base for members of the Austrian SS who were attempting to influence Austrian politics towards an Anschluss with Germany.

By 1936, the SS had been declared illegal in Austria, and the 11th SS-Standarte went completely underground, although still participated in several covert actions against the government of Austria. When Nazi Germany absorbed Austria in 1938, the Standarte "came out in the open" and became the largest regiment command of the SS in Austria, under the authority of the SS-Oberabschnitt Donau.

During this period in the 1930s, one notable member of the 11th SS-Standarate was Amon Göth who would later join the German Concentration Camp service and be immortalized in the film Schindler's List.

When World War II began, most members of the 11th SS-Standarte transferred into the Waffen-SS. A small core of Allgemeine-SS personnel remained in Austria, but as the war progressed there were less and less formal functions performed by the 11th SS-Standarte. The unit effectively existed on paper only after 1944, but was listed as having a posted commander until the fall of Nazi Germany in 1945.

== See also ==
- Standarte (Nazi Germany)

== Commanders ==
- SS-Sturmbannführer Walter Turza (June 11, 1931 - November 12, 1931)
- SS-Sturmbannführer Anton Ziegler (November 12, 1931 - September 9, 1932)
- SS-Sturmbannführer Josef Fitzthum (September 9, 1932 - March 30, 1933)
- SS-Sturmbannführer Anton Ziegler (March 30, 1933 - August 1, 1933)
- SS-Sturmbannführer Hubert Köblinger (August 1, 1933 -August 23, 1933)
- SS-Sturmbannführer Georg Hof (March 23, 1933 - August 1, 1934)
- SS-Sturmbannführer Hans Musil (August 1, 1934 - February 7, 1935)
- SS-Sturmbannführer Karl Urban (February 7, 1935 - March 17, 1937)
- SS-Sturmbannführer Max Plobner (March 17, 1937 - July 8, 1938)
- SS-Sturmbannführer Leopold Koberl (July 8, 1938 - October 1, 1938)
- SS-Sturmbannführer Helmuth Breymann (October 1, 1938 - January 9, 1944)
- SS-Standartenführer Walter Turza (January 9, 1944 - May 8, 1945)
