= Siegfried Seidl =

Austrian career officer and concentration camp commandant (1911–1947)

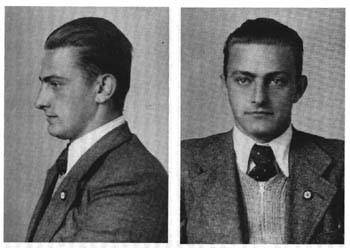
- Born: 24 August 1911; Tulln an der Donau, Austria-Hungary
- Died: 4 February 1947 (aged 35); Vienna, Allied-occupied Austria
- Status: Executed by hanging
- Motive: Nazism
- Convictions: High treason Crimes against humanity
- Penalty: Death

Siegfried Seidl (24 August 1911 – 4 February 1947) was an Austrian career officer and World War II commandant of the Theresienstadt concentration camp located in the present-day Czech Republic. He was also the commandant of the Bergen-Belsen, and later served as a staff officer to Adolf Eichmann. After the war, Seidl was tried in Austria and convicted as a war criminal, sentenced to death, and executed by hanging.

== Early life and education ==
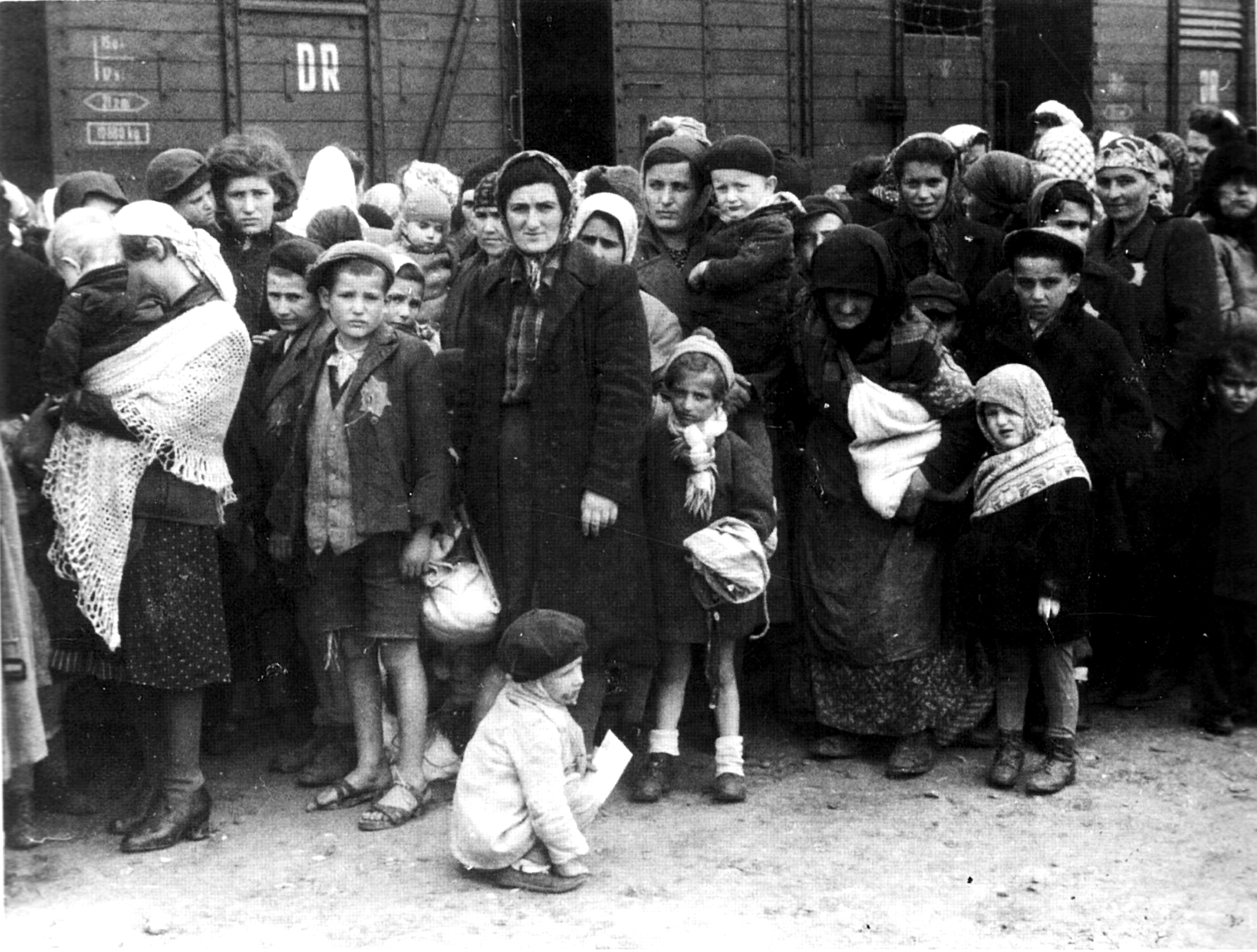
Hungarian Jewish mothers, children, elderly and infirm sent to the left after 'selection" at Auschwitz in summer 1944. They were soon murdered in the gas chambers.

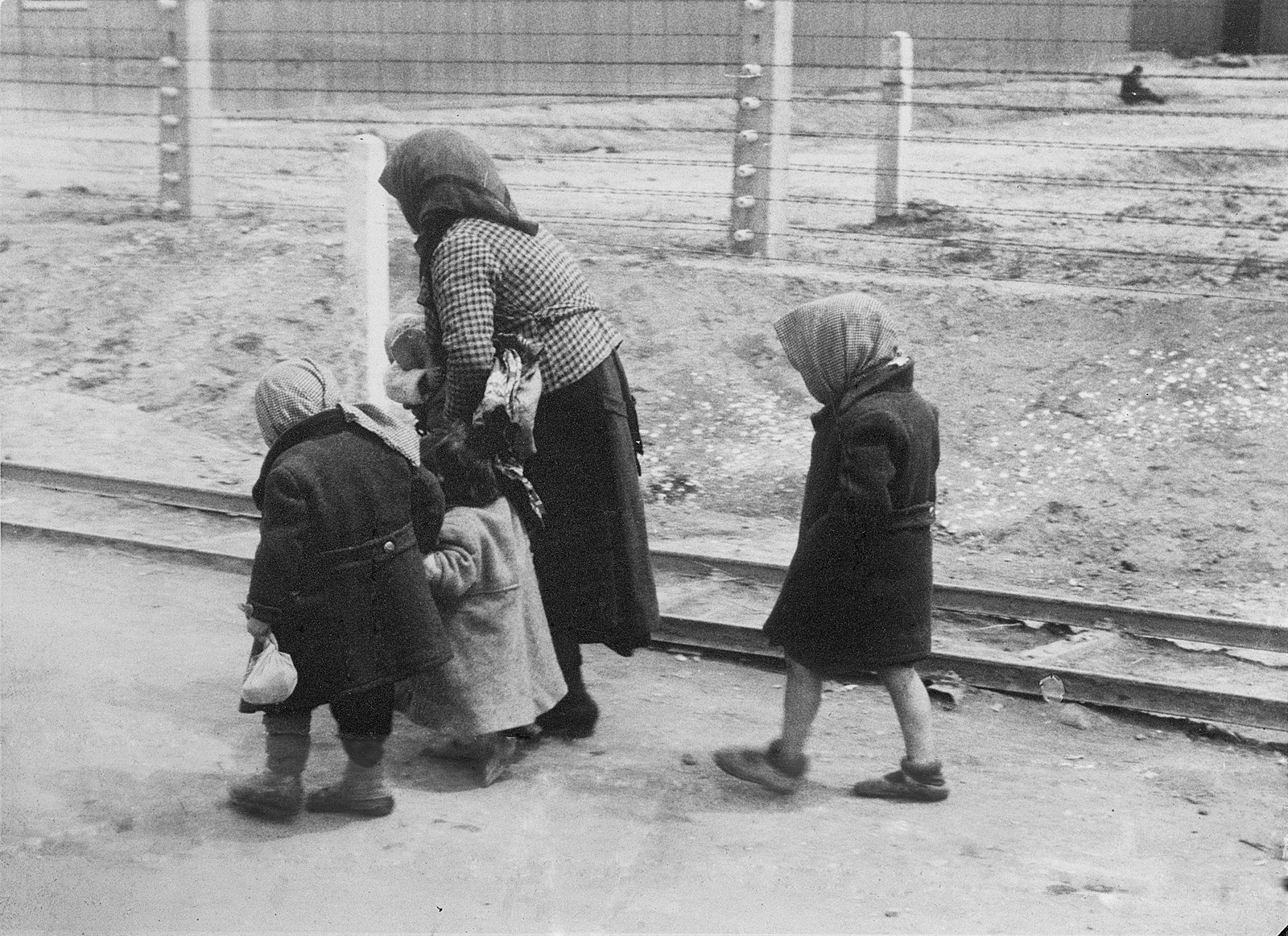
Hungarian Jewish children and an elderly woman on the way to the gas chambers of Auschwitz-Birkenau. Many children and elderly were murdered immediately after arrival and were never registered (May 1944)

Siegfried Seidl was born in Tulln an der Donau (Tulln on the Danube), then part of the Austro-Hungarian Empire, now in Lower Austria. After completing his secondary schooling at the Oberschule, Seidl started to study law. After three semesters, he discontinued his studies and took on various odd jobs.

From 1935 until 1938, Seidl studied history and German studies at the University of Vienna. He obtained his PhD in 1941. This title was taken away from Seidl after he was convicted as a war criminal.

On 2 March 1939 Seidl married Elisabeth Stieber, a former kindergarten teacher. She was a member of the Nazi Party (NSDAP) and its NS-Frauenschaft (NSF: National Socialist Women's League, literally NS-Womanship), and supporting member of the SS.

== Nazi career ==
On 15 October 1930 Seidl joined the Nazi Party (registered as member number 300,738). From September 1931 until May 1932, he was active in the SA. The same day that he left the SA, Seidl was assigned to the 11th SS-Standarte (SS-regiment) as an SS-Oberscharführer (equivalent to Staff Sergeant (US) or Sergeant (UK)) (member number 46,106).

In late 1939, Seidl was called into the police as a result of his SS membership. As of January 1940, he was attached to the Reich Security Main Office (RSHA) – Department IVB4 under Adolf Eichmann's command – and posted to the SS lead section in Posen. On 30 October 1941, Seidl was put in charge by Eichmann with establishing the Theresienstadt ghetto and concentration camp, Czechoslovakia.

From November 1941 until 3 July 1943, he was the ghetto's Commandant. He was responsible for thousands of people being ill-treated and murdered. In November 1942, Seidl was promoted to SS-Hauptsturmführer (captain). During his time there, Eichmann issued Seidl an order to hang 16 Jews for trying to smuggle letters to the outside world. Seidl carried out the order. As commandant Seidl reported directly to Hans Günther, chief of the Zentralstelle für jüdische Auswanderung (Central office for Jewish emigration) in Prague. Günther in turn reported to Eichmann at the Reich Security Main Office IV B 4 in Berlin.

On orders of Eichmann, Seidl was on 3 July 1943 reassigned as Commandant of the Bergen-Belsen concentration camp. He was succeeded at Theresienstadt by SS-Obersturmführer Anton Burger.

In March 1944 Seidl met with the Wehrmacht in Budapest, where he joined the 5th Einsatzgruppe SS paramilitary death squad. As leader of the Debrecen outpost, Seidl was part of the Sondereinsatzkommando-Eichmann (SEK). The SEK organised the largest and quickest deportation of the Holocaust. From 15 May to 9 July 1944, in 56 days, the Germans deported 437,402 Jews from Hungary, according to their records. With the exception of 15,000 people, all were taken to the death camp Auschwitz-Birkenau, where most were murdered.

In July 1944, when the deportation of the Jews of Hungary was finished, Seidl was appointed as acting leader of the SS Special Deployment Command, Outpost Vienna. There he exercised control over the remaining Hungarian Jews in forced-labour camps, which had been built in Vienna and Lower Austria.

After the war ended, Seidl attempted to hide in Austria. However, he was arrested by local police and handed over to American occupation forces on 30 July 1945. Seidl was sent back to Austrian custody on 3 June 1946. Czechoslovakia requested Seidl's extradition. Austrian officials refused, explaining that many of Seidl's victims had been Austrian Jews. In October 1946, Seidl tried by the Volksgericht (Austrian People's Court) for 16 counts of murder related to the executions and other charges. He was acquitted of murder, but found guilty of high treason and crimes against humanity during his leadership position at Theresienstadt. Seidl was sentenced to death and ordered to forfeit all of his property. After hearing the verdict, he calmly bowed, but he turned pale and started trembling. His wife and mother petitioned the president for clemency, saying he had three children. However, the petition was rejected. Seidl was hanged at 6:00 AM on 4 February 1947. As the noose was placed around his neck, Seidl told his executioner he was not sorry for the Jews he had killed and that he had "nothing to regret." He was pronounced dead 7 minutes later.
