= Fierce People (film) =

2005 film by Griffin Dunne

- Theatrical release poster
- Directed by: Griffin Dunne
- Screenplay by: Dirk Wittenborn
- Based on: Fierce People by Dick Wittenborn
- Produced by: Griffin Dunne; Nick Wechsler; Dirk Wittenborn
- Starring: Diane Lane; Donald Sutherland; Anton Yelchin; Chris Evans; Kristen Stewart
- Cinematography: William Rexer
- Edited by: Allyson C. Johnson
- Music by: Nick Laird-Clowes
- Production company: Industry Entertainment
- Distributed by: Lions Gate Films; Autonomous Films
- Release dates: April 24, 2005 (Tribeca); April 28, 2006 (Canada); September 30, 2007 (United States)
- Running time: 107 minutes
- Countries: United States; Canada
- Languages: English; Tagalog
- Box office: $269,755

Fierce People is a 2005 independent drama thriller film adapted by Dirk Wittenborn from his 2002 novel of the same name. Directed by Griffin Dunne, it starred Diane Lane, Donald Sutherland, Anton Yelchin, Kristen Stewart, and Chris Evans. The film explores many facets of family and societal dysfunction, including drug abuse, mental illness, and rape.

== Plot ==
Trapped in his drug-addicted mother's apartment, 16-year-old Finn Earl wants nothing more than to escape New York City. He wants to spend the summer in South America studying the Ishkanani Indians (known as the "Fierce People") with his anthropologist father whom he has never met. Finn's plans change after he is arrested when he buys drugs for his mother, Lower East Side Liz, who works as a massage therapist. Determined to get their lives back on track, Liz moves the two of them into a guesthouse for the summer on the country estate of her ex-client, the aging billionaire, Ogden C. Osbourne.

In Osbourne's world of privilege and power, Finn and Liz encounter the super rich, a tribe portrayed as fiercer and more mysterious than anything the teenager might find in the South American jungle.

While Liz battles her substance abuse and struggles to win back her son's love and trust, Finn falls in love with Osbourne's granddaughter, Maya Langley. He befriends her older brother, Bryce Langley; and wins the favor of Osbourne. When rape and violence ends Finn's acceptance within the Osbourne clan, the promises of this world quickly sour. Finn and Liz, caught in a harrowing struggle for their dignity, discover that membership in a group comes at a steep price.

== Cast ==
- Diane Lane as Liz Earl
- Donald Sutherland as Ogden C. Osbourne
- Anton Yelchin as Finn Earl
- Chris Evans as Bryce Langley
- Kristen Stewart as Maya Langley
- Paz de la Huerta as Jilly
- Blu Mankuma as Detective Gates
- Elizabeth Perkins as Mrs. Langley
- Christopher Shyer as Dr. Richard "Dick" Leffler
- Garry Chalk as McCallum
- Ryan McDonald as Ian
- Dexter Bell as Marcus Gates
- Kaleigh Day as Paige
- Aaron Brooks as Giacomo
- Teach Grant as Dwayne
- Dirk Wittenborn as Fox Blanchard
- Eddie Rosales as Iskanani shaman
- Will Lyman as Voice of documentary narrator

== Production ==
The inspiration for the novel on which the film is based is author Dirk Wittenborn’s experiences growing up in a modest household and feeling like an outsider among the super-rich in an upper-crust New Jersey enclave.

Portions of the film were shot on location in British Columbia, Canada at Hatley Castle.

== Reception ==
=== Box office ===
The film first premiered at the Tribeca Festival on April 24, 2005. It later received a limited release in 2007 and grossed $85,410 at the box office in the U.S.

=== Critical response ===
Fierce People received mostly negative reviews. On the review aggregator website Rotten Tomatoes, 24% of 45 critics' reviews are positive, with an average rating of 4.5/10. The website's consensus reads: "Fierce People's premise of a teenager studying rich people like animals is grating and self-satisfied, and Anton Yelchin's smug performance makes the film even harder to agree with." On Metacritic the film has a score of 54% based on reviews from 15 critics, indicating "mixed or average" reviews.

Film critic James Berardinelli wrote that it was "a shame" that the film "starts out as a satire-tinged, jocular drama that undergoes a jarring shift in tone to the dark side," that the story "relies a little too much on plot contrivances," and that Dunne's "handling of the dramatic tone shifts [...] is a little unsure." Writing for the San Francisco Chronicle, critic Steven Winn reported that the film "plays like a movie that some teenage boy cooked up in his chemistry lab. There are lots of potent things floating around in it [...] but the mix just sits there without producing any notable reactions," that Dunne "has more storylines than he knows what to do with," and that the film "becomes by turns portentous, violent and finally very silly." Nick Schager of Slant Magazine wrote that the film "is structured around the type of analogy that makes one pine for total sensory failure," that it is marred by "the filmmakers’ clear self-satisfaction with what they believe to be a clever narrative conceit," and that "just around the corner from [its] excruciatingly contrived premise lies a giant heap of bland satire."
