= Dirk Wittenborn =

American screenwriter and novelist

- Born: Christopher Dirk Wittenborn; November 5, 1951; New Haven, Connecticut, U.S.
- Education: University of Pennsylvania
- Occupations: Screenwriter and novelist
- Spouse: Kirsten Wittenborn
- Children: Lilo Wittenborn
- Writing career
- Period: 1980–present
- Notable works: Pharmakon (2008); Fierce People (2002)

Dirk Wittenborn (born November 5, 1951) is an American screenwriter and novelist.

== Biography ==
He graduated from the University of Pennsylvania and started writing in the early 1980s while working at Saturday Night Live.

== Works ==
=== Fiction ===
- Pharmakon (2008)
- Fierce People (2002), cinematized in 2005 under the same name.
- Zoë (1983) (republished 2004 as Catwalk)
- Eclipse (1980)

=== Nonfiction ===
- "The Social Climber's Bible" (2014)
- Bongo Europa (2006)

=== Film ===
- The Lucky Ones (2008)
- Fierce People (2005)
- Born Rich (2003) (producer)
