= Georgina Bloomberg =

American equestrian (born 1983)

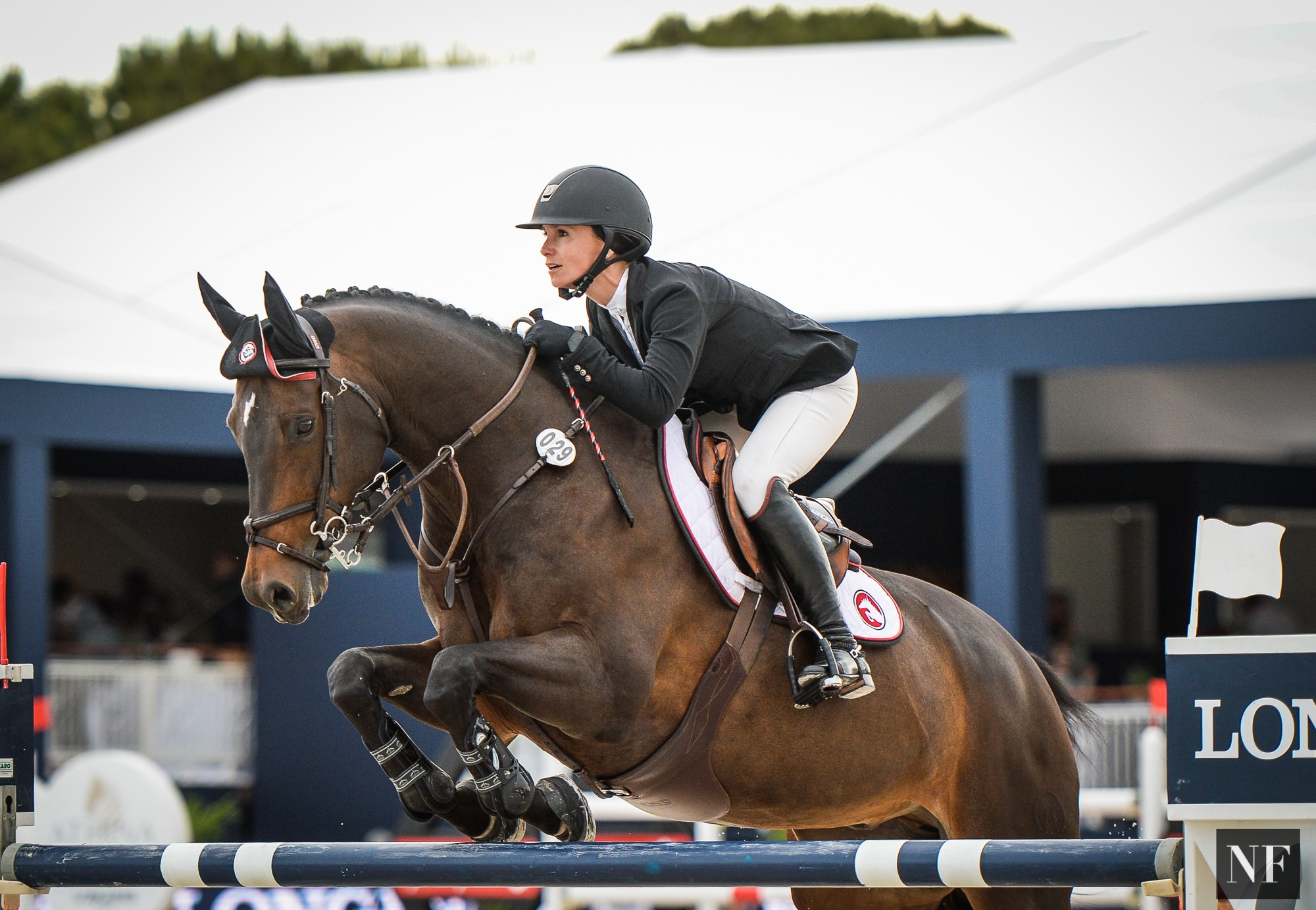
- Bloomberg riding Caleno 3 in 2016

Personal information
- Full name: Georgina Leigh Bloomberg
- Nationality: United States
- Discipline: Show jumping
- Born: January 20, 1983 (age 43); New York City, U.S.

Website
- georginabloomberg.com
Medal record
Representing United States
Equestrian
Pan American Games
Bronze medal – third place	2015 Toronto	Team jumping

Georgina Leigh Bloomberg (born January 20, 1983) is an American equestrian and the owner of the equestrian team New York Empire. She is the daughter of Susan Brown and Michael Bloomberg, the former mayor of New York City and founder of Bloomberg L.P..

== Early life ==
Bloomberg was born in New York City. Her sibling, Emma, is four years older. She attended The Spence School, and graduated from New York University's Gallatin School of Individualized Study in 2010. She studied fashion design at The New School's Parsons School of Design in 2012.

== Career ==
Bloomberg began riding horses at age four in 1987. In 1989, she began competing and won best child rider awards at every major horse show on the US East Coast. In 2000, she began competing in jumpers. In 2001, at age 18, she won the United States Equestrian Team (USET)'s Talent Derby. In 2003, Bloomberg won the individual gold medal.

In 2004, at age 21, she became a professional rider, and was the winner of the Maxine Beard Award. In 2005, she was the winner of the Metropolitan Cup and the Las Vegas Invitational Knockout competition, competed in the World Cup Finals, and was a member of the winning Samsung Super League team in La Baule, France. In 2007, she won the WEF Challenge Cup, and was a member of the winning USA teams in Hamina, Finland, and Falsterbo, Sweden. In Sweden, Bloomberg contributed her first double clear nations cup performance at a 5* competition. She also placed fourth in the Queen's Cup at Hickstead and was the highest placed American in the Dublin Grand Prix that summer. In 2008, Bloomberg was a member of the last Samsung Super League Final in Barcelona.

In 2010, she was the winner of the Empire State Grand Prix, and the Bluegrass Festival Grand Prix. In August 2014, she anchored the U.S. team victory at Furusiyya Nations Cup in Gijon, Spain, with a double clear performance. She was the winner of the inaugural Central Park Grand Prix CSI 3 in 2014. In 2015, Bloomberg won the Adequan Grand Prix CSI 3* at the 2015 Winter Equestrian Festival. At the 2015 Pan American Games, she won team bronze as the newest member of the U.S. Equestrian Team. In 2016, she was the winner of the Royalton Farms Open Jumper 1.40 m class at the Hampton Classic Horse Show. She was also the winner of the American Gold Cup Qualifier and the Hermes Sellier Classic at the American Gold Cup. Also in 2016, she participated in the inaugural season of the Global Champions League, as a rider for and owner of Team Miami Glory.

After two years with Team Miami Glory, Bloomberg began the 2018 season as both a rider and team owner for the New York Empire. In 2019, Bloomberg promoted the Longines Global Champions Tour Finals, taking place in her hometown, New York City.

Bloomberg currently has several show jumping horses. In the M40 to Grand Prix divisions, she has Paola 233, Lilli, Cessna 24, Crown 5, Calista, Quibelle, Manodie, Cliff Z, and South Street. In the young horse divisions, she has Manhattan, Excelsior, and Starry Night.

== Author ==
Bloomberg has co-authored several young adult novels about the equestrian show circuit:

- The A Circuit, Georgina Bloomberg and Catherine Hapka, 2011, ISBN 978-1-59990-634-8
- My Favorite Mistake, Georgina Bloomberg and Catherine Hapka, 2012
- Off Course, Georgina Bloomberg and Catherine Hapka, 2012
- Rein It In, Georgina Bloomberg and Catherine Hapka, 2013

== Philanthropy ==
At 23, Bloomberg founded the Rider's Closet, which collects new and gently used riding clothing and boots and provides them to therapeutic riding programs, pony clubs, intercollegiate riding programs, and individuals in need.

Bloomberg currently serves on the board of the Hampton Classic Horse Show, the Emma and Georgina Bloomberg Foundation, and the Bloomberg Family Foundation. In 2023, the foundation reported revenue of $1.17 million, $1.4 million in expenses, and total assets of $26.3 million.

She sits on the board of trustees for the U.S. Equestrian Team. Bloomberg is also a vice president at Animal Aid USA.

In 2016, the Humane Society of the United States recognized Bloomberg with the Compassion in Action Award "for her tireless work to protect all animals."

She is a founding member of Humane Generation/Friends of Finn committee, which works with the Humane Society of the United States to end the inhumane treatment of dogs in puppy mills and advocates for pet adoption.

== Personal life ==
In December 2013, Bloomberg had a son, Jasper, with then-boyfriend Ramiro Quintana, an Argentine Olympic show jumping rider.

Bloomberg is engaged to investment banker Justin Waterman. The couple has two children: Sebastian, born in 2023, and Scarlett, born in 2025.

She owns several rescue animals, including four dogs, a goat, two mules, and two miniature horses. Forbes included her in a list of the 20 “Most Intriguing Billionaire Heiresses”. She divides her time between residences in Manhattan, North Salem, New York, and Wellington, Florida.

In early 2025, she purchased a 3,000-square-foot, four-bedroom home on Great Peconic Bay in the Hamptons for approximately $4 million, reportedly setting a pricing record for the area.

=== Injuries ===
Bloomberg was born with spondylolisthesis, a spinal condition that makes her back prone to fractures due to instability. In 2002, she broke her back while training for the Hampton Classic and wore a brace for six months to recover. She later sustained another back fracture and a mild concussion after falling from a horse. Despite the injury, she expressed her intent to continue competing. In 2011, Bloomberg underwent spinal surgery and took an eight-month break from the sport to recover.
