= CNN Sunday Morning =

CNN Sunday Morning is a news program on CNN in the United States hosted by a series of rotating news anchors. Prior to that, it was hosted by T.J. Holmes until he left the network in December 2011. The program is produced in Atlanta and takes a look ahead at the day's top news stories and events. It airs from 6:00 to 7:30am and 8:00am to 9:00am ET on Sunday mornings.
