= Theodor Dannecker =

SS Officer and Holocaust perpetrator (1913–1945)

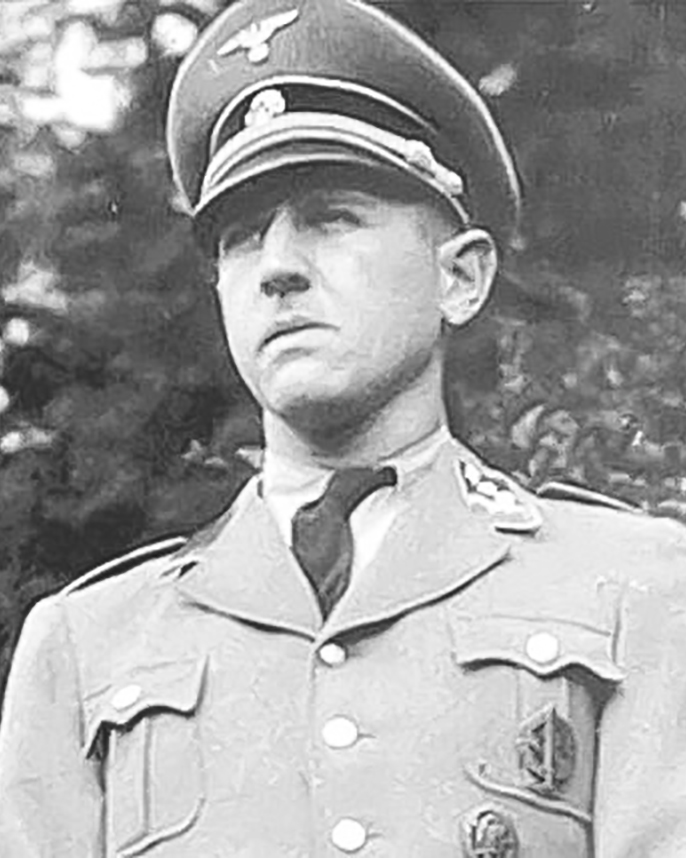
- Dannecker in 1942
- Born: 27 March 1913; Tübingen, Kingdom of Württemberg, German Empire
- Died: 10 December 1945 (aged 32); Bad Tölz, Allied-occupied Germany
- Cause of death: Suicide
- SS service
- Allegiance: Nazi Germany
- Branch: Schutzstaffel
- Service years: 1934–1945
- Rank: SS-Hauptsturmführer

Theodor Dannecker (27 March 1913 – 10 December 1945) was a German SS-captain (Hauptsturmführer), a key aide to Adolf Eichmann in the deportation of Jews during World War II.

A trained lawyer, Dannecker first served at the Reich Security Main Office in Berlin before being sent to France as specialist on Nazi anti-Jewish policies (Judenberater). Throughout the war Dannecker oversaw the implementation of the Final Solution sending Jewish men, women and children from France (1942), Bulgaria (1943), Italy (1944) and Hungary to Auschwitz concentration camp. Captured in 1945 by American soldiers, he committed suicide in prison.

== Early life ==
After completing trade school, the Tübingen-born Dannecker first worked as a textile dealer until 1932 when he joined the Nazi Party and the Schutzstaffel (SS). In 1934 he became a member of the SS-Verfügungstruppe (SS-VT), an independent SS unit of political combat troops at the disposal of the Nazi Party. In the same year he was a guard at the Columbia-Haus in Berlin, one of the first German concentration camps, and enlisted into the SS-Wachverband V Brandenburg, a precursor of the SS-Totenkopfverbände (SS-TV) operating in Oranienburg and Columbia-Haus concentration camps. A year later he was assigned to the SS Security Service (Sicherheitsdienst; SD). In March 1937 Dannecker became a collaborator of Adolf Eichmann in the Department of Jewish Affairs within the SD.

== Second World War ==
From September 1940 until July 1942, Dannecker was leader of the Judenreferat at the SD office in Paris, where he ordered and oversaw round ups by French Police. More than 13,000 Jews were deported to Auschwitz concentration camp where most were murdered in the Final Solution. Owing to misuse of his position, partially due to his theft of German confiscated property, he was ordered back to Berlin in August 1942.

On 21 January 1943 he was sent to Sofia to assist the Bulgarian government, an ally of Nazi Germany, with the deportation of Jews. Dannecker was the highest German official in charge of the Holocaust, in the Bulgarian territories. During March 1943, Bulgarian military and police authorities deported 11,343 Jews from the Bulgarian-occupied regions of Macedonia, Pomoravlje in occupied Yugoslavia and Thrace to Auschwitz-Birkenau and Treblinka. Most were murdered in the gas chambers or shot, only 12 survived. However, his attempt to deport Jews with Bulgarian citizenship from Bulgaria proper failed due to widespread opposition by Bulgarian intellectuals, the heads of the Bulgarian Orthodox Church, Metropolitan Bishops Stephan from Sofia and Kiril from Plovdiv as well as from the deputy speaker of the parliament Dimiter Peshev all demanding a halt to the deportations; these actions eventually forced Boris III of Bulgaria to change his mind and cancel the deportations in May 1943.

Dannecker continued to deport Italian Jews between September 1943 and January 1944, when Italy surrendered to the Allies and Germans occupied Italy. Before the German occupation, Benito Mussolini refused to turn over Jews to the Nazis except those in areas annexed or occupied by the Italians in the Balkans. Not seen as efficient enough, he was replaced in this role by Friedrich Boßhammer, who was, like Dannecker, closely associated with Eichmann.

After Germany occupied Hungary, Dannecker and the Hungarian establishment (not the Arrow Cross, which came to power only in October 1944) deported more than a half a million Hungarian Jews between early 1944 and summer of the same year. Dannecker developed under Eichmann into one of the SS's most ruthless and experienced experts on the "Jewish Question", and his involvement in the genocide of European Jewry was one of primary responsibility.

A passage from a 1942 report by Dannecker illustrates how the "Jewish Question" was handled in France:

Subject: Points for the discussion with the French State Secretary for Police, Bousquet... The recent operation for arresting stateless Jews in Paris has yielded only about 8,000 adults and about 4,000 children. But trains for the deportation of 40,000 Jews, for the moment, have been put in readiness by the Reich Ministry of Transport. Since the deportation of the children is not possible for the time being, the number of Jews ready for removal is quite insufficient. A further Jewish operation must therefore be started immediately. For this purpose Jews of Belgian and Dutch nationality may be taken into consideration, in addition to the former German, Austrian, Czech, Polish and Russian Jews who have so far been considered as being stateless. It must be expected, however, that this category will not yield sufficient numbers, and thus the French have no choice but to include those Jews who were naturalized in France after 1927, or even after 1919.

== Suicide ==
At the end of the war in Europe, Dannecker eluded capture, possibly using false identification and was being hidden by his wife in Bad Tölz. In December 1945, Dannecker was arrested by the United States Army. On 10 December 1945 he committed suicide in a prison camp before he was tried.

== See also ==
- Union générale des israélites de France

== Sources ==
- Bartrop, P.R.; Grimm, E.E. (2019). Perpetrating the Holocaust: Leaders, Enablers, and Collaborators. ABC-CLIO. ISBN 978-1-4408-5897-0.
- "Bulgaria". Holocaust Encyclopedia. 1943-03-11.
- Cesarani, David (2005) [2004]. Eichmann: His Life and Crimes. London: Vintage. ISBN 978-0-09-944844-0.
- Comforty, J.; Bloomfield, M.A.; Bartov, O. (2021). The Stolen Narrative of the Bulgarian Jews and the Holocaust. Lexington Studies in Jewish Literature. Lexington Books. ISBN 978-1-79363-292-0.
- Steur, Claudia (1997). Theodor Dannecker: Ein Funktionär der Endlösung (in German). Essen: Klartext. ISBN 3-88474-545-X.
- Todorov, T. (1999). The Fragility of Goodness: Why Bulgaria's Jews Survived the Holocaust. London: Weidenfeld and Nicolson. ISBN 978-0-691-11564-1.
- Wistrich, R.S. (2013). Who's Who in Nazi Germany. Taylor & Francis. ISBN 978-1-136-41388-9.
