= Igor Vukić =

Croatian journalist

- Born: 1966 (age 59–60); Zagreb, SR Croatia, Yugoslavia
- Notable work: Radni logor Jasenovac

Igor Vukić (born 26 January 1966) is a Croatian journalist and historical negationist. He is the author of books on the Jasenovac concentration camp, including Radni logor Jasenovac (Jasenovac Labour Camp), which advances his thesis that Jasenovac was simply a labour camp, rather than an extermination camp as accepted by scholars.

== Biography ==
Igor Vukić was born in Zagreb, Croatia in 1966 to a family of Serbian origin from Gradina Donja. He attended primary school in Pakracka Poljana, secondary school in Kutina, and graduated from the Faculty of Political Sciences in Zagreb in 1992. Most of his family were in the Jasenovac concentration camp during the Second World War.

He works as an independent journalist and researcher and has authored two books on Jasenovac. Radni logor Jasenovac, was published in 2018, and the material is mainly based on the research of the funds of the Croatian State Archives in Zagreb. It claims that Jasenovac was a labour camp where no mass murder took place by distorting and selectively cherry-picking data.

== Career ==
Vukić worked as a journalist in newspapers: Vjesnik (1990–1991), Novi list (1994–2001), Jutarnji list (2001–2005), Poslovni dnevnik (2005–2009) and Privredni vjesnik (2009–2016). He worked at Kutina Television (1992–1993). Currently, he writes a column for Hrvatski tjednik, a weekly magazine from Zadar.

On 30 May 2018, Vukić was invited as a guest on the "Good afternoon, Croatia" programme on the state owned broadcaster HRT where he stated among other things, that the extermination camp Jasenovac had served as a labour camp or a prison for active opponents of the state and for Jews excluded from deportation to Germany, and described Ustasha leader Ante Pavelic as the most responsible person for rescuing camp inmates. The public institution running the Jasenovac memorial complex (JUSP) condemned Vukić's views and criticized the station for giving him a platform. Vukić's appearance was also condemned by members of the Jewish community in Croatia who were "insulted, shocked, and disturbed" by the ideas and views expressed in the program.

Vukić reportedly received a grant of 50000 HRK in 2018 for his project that denies the Ustashe crimes in the Jasenovac extermination camp. The project is entitled "Društvo za istraživanje trostrukog logora Jasenovac" (Society for research of the triple camp of Jasenovac), and Vukić is its secretary, with Stjepan Razum being its president.

== See also ==
- Josip Pečarić
- Stjepan Razum
