= Historical negationism =

Distortion of historical record

Historical negationism, also called historical denialism, is the falsification, trivialization, or distortion of the historical record. This is distinct from historical revisionism, a broader term encompassing academic reinterpretations of history driven by new evidence or reasoning. In attempting to revise and influence how the past is seen, historical negationism acts as illegitimate historical revisionism by using techniques inadmissible in proper historical discourse, such as presenting known forged documents as genuine, inventing ingenious but implausible reasons for distrusting genuine documents, attributing conclusions to books and sources that report the opposite, manipulating statistical series to support the given point of view, and deliberately mistranslating traditional or modern texts.

Some countries, such as Germany, have criminalized the negationist revision of certain historical events, while others have more permissive policy for various reasons, such as protection of free speech. Others have in the past mandated negationist views, such as the US state of California, where it is claimed that some schoolchildren have been explicitly prevented from learning about the California genocide. Notable examples of negationism include the Lost Cause of the Confederacy, the clean Wehrmacht myth, the Austria victim theory, and denials of the Holocaust, Nakba, Holodomor, the Armenian genocide and Japanese war crimes. In literature, it has been imaginatively depicted in some works of fiction, such as Nineteen Eighty-Four by George Orwell. In modern times, negationism may spread via political, religious agendas through state media, mainstream media, and new media, such as the Internet.

== Origin of the term ==
The term negationism (négationnisme) was first coined by the French historian Henry Rousso in his 1987 book The Vichy Syndrome which looked at the French popular memory of Vichy France and the French Resistance. Rousso posited that it was necessary to distinguish between legitimate historical revisionism in Holocaust studies and politically motivated denial of the Holocaust, which he termed negationism.

== Purposes ==
Usually, the purpose of historical negation is to align with tribal or ideological beliefs, demonize an enemy, maintain group identity, or preserve social bonds, often through motivated reasoning and denial of established facts.

=== Ideological influence ===
The principal functions of negationist history are the abilities to control ideological and political influence.

History is a social resource that contributes to shaping national identity, culture, and the public memory. Through the study of history, people are imbued with a particular cultural identity; therefore, by negatively revising history, the negationist can craft a specific, ideological identity. Because historians are credited as people who single-mindedly pursue truth, by way of fact, negationist historians capitalize on the historian's professional credibility, and present their pseudohistory as true scholarship. By adding a measure of credibility to the work of revised history, the ideas of the negationist historian are more readily accepted in the public mind. As such, professional historians recognize the revisionist practice of historical negationism as the work of "truth-seekers" finding different truths in the historical record to fit their political, social, and ideological contexts.

=== Political influence ===
History provides insight into past political policies and consequences, and thus assists people in extrapolating political implications for contemporary society. Historical negationism is applied to cultivate a specific political myth, sometimes with official consent from the government, whereby self-taught, amateur, and dissident academic historians either manipulate or misrepresent historical accounts to achieve political ends. For example, after the late 1930s in the Soviet Union, the ideology of the Communist Party of the Soviet Union and historiography in the Soviet Union treated reality and the party line as the same intellectual entity, especially in regards to the Russian Civil War and peasant rebellions; Soviet historical negationism advanced a specific, political, and ideological agenda about Russia and its place in world history.

== Techniques ==
Historical negationism applies the techniques of research, quotation, and presentation for deception of the reader and denial of the historical record. In support of the "revised history" perspective, the negationist historian uses false documents as genuine sources, presents specious reasons to distrust genuine documents, exploits published opinions by quoting out of historical context, manipulates statistics, and mistranslates texts in other languages. The revision techniques of historical negationism operate in the intellectual space of public debate for the advancement of a given interpretation of history and the cultural perspective of the "revised history". As a document, the revised history is used to negate the validity of the factual, documentary record, and so reframe explanations and perceptions of the discussed historical event, to deceive the reader, the listener, and the viewer; therefore, historical negationism functions as a technique of propaganda. Rather than submit their works for peer review, negationist historians rewrite history and use logical fallacies to construct arguments that will obtain the desired results, a "revised history" that supports an agenda – political, ideological, religious, etc.

In the practice of historiography, the British historian Richard J. Evans describes the technical differences, between professional historians and negationist historians, commenting: "Reputable and professional historians do not suppress parts of quotations from documents that go against their own case, but take them into account, and, if necessary, amend their own case, accordingly. They do not present, as genuine, documents which they know to be forged, just because these forgeries happen to back up what they are saying. They do not invent ingenious, but implausible, and utterly unsupported reasons for distrusting genuine documents, because these documents run counter to their arguments; again, they amend their arguments, if this is the case, or, indeed, abandon them altogether. They do not consciously attribute their own conclusions to books and other sources, which, in fact, on closer inspection, actually say the opposite. They do not eagerly seek out the highest possible figures in a series of statistics, independently of their reliability, or otherwise, simply because they want, for whatever reason, to maximize the figure in question, but rather, they assess all the available figures, as impartially as possible, to arrive at a number that will withstand the critical scrutiny of others. They do not knowingly mistranslate sources in foreign languages to make them more serviceable to themselves. They do not willfully invent words, phrases, quotations, incidents and events, for which there is no historical evidence, to make their arguments more plausible."

=== Deception ===
Deception includes falsifying information, obscuring the truth, and lying to manipulate public opinion about the historical event discussed in the revised history. The negationist historian applies the techniques of deception to achieve either a political or an ideological goal, or both. The field of history distinguishes among history books based upon credible, verifiable sources, which were peer-reviewed before publication; and deceptive history books, based upon unreliable sources, which were not submitted for peer review. The distinction among types of history books rests upon the research techniques used in writing a history. Verifiability, accuracy, and openness to criticism are central tenets of historical scholarship. When these techniques are sidestepped, the presented historical information might be deliberately deceptive, a "revised history".

=== Denial ===
Denial is defensively protecting information from being shared with other historians, and claiming that facts are untrue, especially denial of the war crimes and crimes against humanity perpetrated in the course of World War II (1939–1945) and the Holocaust (1933–1945). The negationist historian protects the historical-revisionism project by blame shifting, censorship, distraction, and media manipulation; occasionally, denial by protection includes risk management for the physical security of revisionist sources.

=== Relativization and trivialization ===
Comparing certain historical atrocities to other crimes is the practice of relativization, interpretation by moral judgements, to alter public perception of the first historical atrocity. Although such comparisons often occur in negationist history, their pronouncement is not usually part of revisionist intentions upon the historical facts, but an opinion of moral judgement.

- The Holocaust and Nazism: The historian Deborah Lipstadt says that the concept of "comparable Allied wrongs", such as the expulsion of Germans after World War II from Nazi-colonized lands and the formal Allied war crimes, is at the centre of, and is a continually repeated theme of, contemporary Holocaust denial, and that such relativization presents "immoral equivalencies".
- Some proponents of the Lost Cause of the Confederacy use certain historical examples of non-chattel slavery in discussions on the role of the slave system of the South, however insofar as it is to further this ideological point it obscures and downplays the specificities of the American slave system- both its place in history, and comparison to other such systems overall. For example, court decisions and statutes mandated multi-generational slavery unlike many other slave systems, and further beyond that stated that a freedman could never become a citizen of the United States. These measures, related to perpetuation and racist characterization besides further restrictions on life even outside slavery in support of it distinguished the system compared to all, or an overwhelming amount of historical systems
- Connected to the Lost Cause of the Confederacy is the Irish slaves myth, a pseudo-historical narrative which conflates the experiences of Irish indentured servants and enslaved Africans in the Americas. This distortion, which was historically promoted by Irish nationalists such as John Mitchel, has in the modern-day been promoted by white supremacists in the United States to negate the mistreatment experienced by African Americans (such as racism and segregation), also opposing slavery reparations.

== Examples ==
=== Book burning ===
Book burnings throughout history have been carried out as a form of historical negationism. In 1933, the government of Nazi Germany banned (among other types of books) all historical works "whose purpose is to denigrate the origin, the spirit and the culture of the German Volk, or to dissolve the racial and structural order of the Volk, or that denies the force and importance of leading historical figures in favor of egalitarianism and the masses, and which seeks to drag them through the mud." From 1933 onwards, the German Student Union carried a book burning campaign across Nazi Germany and territories annexed or occupied by the Nazi regime. Other instances of book burning as historical negationism include the founder of the Aztec Empire Itzcoatl, who ordered the burning of all historical codices during his reign because it was "not wise that all the people should know the paintings". This allowed the Aztec state to develop a state-sanctioned official history and mythos that venerated Huitzilopochtli.

==== Chinese book burning ====
The Burning of books and burying of scholars (traditional Chinese: 焚書坑儒; simplified Chinese: 焚书坑儒; pinyin: fénshū kēngrú; lit. 'burning of books and burying (alive) of (Confucian) scholars'), or "Fires of Qin", refers to the burning of writings and slaughter of scholars during the Qin dynasty of ancient China, between the period of 213 and 210 BC. "Books" at this point refers to writings on bamboo strips, which were then bound together. The exact extent of the damage is hard to assess; technological books were to be spared and even the "objectionable" books, poetry and philosophy in particular, were preserved in imperial archives and allowed to be kept by the official scholar.

=== United States history ===
The historical negationism of American Civil War revisionists and Neo-Confederates claims that the Confederate States (1861–1865) were the defenders rather than the instigators of the American Civil War, and that the Confederacy's motivation for secession from the United States was the maintenance of the Southern states' rights and limited government, rather than the preservation and expansion of chattel slavery.

Regarding Neo-Confederate revisionism of the U.S. Civil War, the historian Brooks D. Simpson says: "This is an active attempt to reshape historical memory, an effort by white Southerners to find historical justifications for present-day actions. The neo–Confederate movement's ideologues have grasped that if they control how people remember the past, they'll control how people approach the present and the future. Ultimately, this is a very conscious war for memory and heritage. It's a quest for legitimacy, the eternal quest for justification."

In the early 20th century, Mildred Rutherford, the historian general of the United Daughters of the Confederacy (UDC), led the attack against American history textbooks that did not present the "Lost Cause of the Confederacy" version of the history of the U.S. Civil War. To that pedagogical end, Rutherford assembled a "massive collection" of documents that included "essay contests on the glory of the Ku Klux Klan and personal tributes to faithful slaves". About the historical negationism of the United Daughters of the Confederacy, the historian David Blight says: "All UDC members and leaders were not as virulently racist as Rutherford, but all, in the name of a reconciled nation, participated in an enterprise that deeply influenced the white supremacist vision of Civil War memory."

==== California genocide ====
Between 1846 and 1873, following the conquest of California by the United States, the region's Indigenous Californian population plummeted from around 150,000 to around 30,000 due to disease, famine, forced removals, slavery, and massacres. Many historians refer to the massacres as the California genocide. Between 9,500 and 16,000 California Natives were killed by both government forces and white settlers in massacres during this period. Despite the well documented evidence of the widespread massacres and atrocities, the public school curriculum and history textbooks approved by the California Department of Education ignore the history of this genocide.

According to author Clifford Trafzer, although many historians have pushed for recognition of the genocide in public school curricula, government-approved textbooks omit mention of the genocide because of the dominance of conservative publishing companies with an ideological impetus to deny the genocide, the fear of publishing companies being branded as un-American for discussing it, and the unwillingness of state and federal government officials to acknowledge the genocide due to the possibility of having to pay reparations to indigenous communities affected by it.

=== War crimes ===
==== Japanese war crimes ====
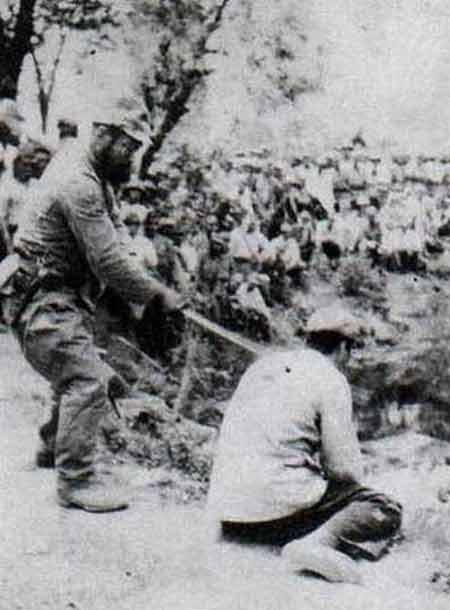
A Chinese POW about to be beheaded by a Japanese officer with a shin gunto during the Nanking Massacre

The post-war minimization of the war crimes of Japanese imperialism is an example of "illegitimate" historical revisionism; some contemporary Japanese revisionists, such as Yūko Iwanami (granddaughter of General Hideki Tojo), propose that Japan's invasion of China, and World War II, itself, were justified reactions to the Western imperialism of the time. On 2 March 2007, Japanese prime minister Shinzo Abe denied that the military had forced women into sexual slavery during the war, saying, "The fact is, there is no evidence to prove there was coercion". Before he spoke, some Liberal Democratic Party legislators also sought to revise Yōhei Kōno's apology to former comfort women in 1993; likewise, there was the controversial negation of the six-week Nanking Massacre in 1937–1938.

Shinzō Abe was general secretary of a group of parliament members concerned with history education (Japanese: 日本の前途と歴史教育を考える若手議員の会) that is associated with the Japanese Society for History Textbook Reform, and was a special advisor to Nippon Kaigi, which are two openly revisionist groups denying, downplaying, or justifying various Japanese war crimes. Editor-in-chief of the conservative Yomiuri Shimbun Tsuneo Watanabe criticized the Yasukuni Shrine as a bastion of revisionism: "The Yasukuni Shrine runs a museum where they show items in order to encourage and worship militarism. It's wrong for the prime minister to visit such a place". Other critics note that men, who would contemporarily be perceived as "Korean" and "Chinese", are enshrined for the military actions they effected as Japanese Imperial subjects.

Note: This section is not included in the Japanese Wikipedia (ja:歴史否定主義).

==== Hiroshima and Nagasaki bombings ====
The Hibakusha ("explosion-affected people") of Hiroshima and Nagasaki seek compensation from their government and criticize it for failing to "accept responsibility for having instigated and then prolonged an aggressive war long after Japan's defeat was apparent, resulting in a heavy toll in Japanese, Asian and American lives". EB Sledge expressed concern that such revisionism, in his words "mellowing", would allow the harsh facts of the history that led to the bombings to be forgotten. Historians Hill and Koshiro have stated that attempts to minimize the importance of the bombings as "righteous revenge and salvation" would be revisionism, and that while the Japanese should recognize their atrocities led the bombing, Americans also have to accept the fact that their own actions "caused massive destruction and suffering that has lasted for fifty years".

==== Croatian war crimes in World War II ====
Some Croats, including some high-ranked officials and political leaders during the 1990s and far-right organization members, have attempted to minimize the magnitude of the genocide perpetrated against Serbs and other ethnic minorities in the World War II puppet state of Nazi Germany, the Independent State of Croatia. By 1989, the future President of Croatia Franjo Tuđman (who had been a Partisan during World War II), had embraced Croatian nationalism and published Horrors of War: Historical Reality and Philosophy, in which he questioned the official number of victims killed by the Ustaše during World War II, particularly at the Jasenovac concentration camp. Yugoslav and Serbian historiography had long exaggerated the number of victims at the camp. Tuđman criticized the long-standing figures, but also described the camp as a "work camp", giving an estimate of between 30,000 and 40,000 deaths. Tuđman's government's toleration of Ustaša symbols and their crimes often dismissed in public, frequently strained relations with Israel.

Croatia's far-right often advocates the false theory that Jasenovac was a "labour camp" where mass murder did not take place. In 2017, two videos of former Croatian president Stjepan Mesić from 1992 were made public in which he stated that Jasenovac was not a death camp. The far-right NGO "The Society for Research of the Threefold Jasenovac Camp" also advocates this disproven theory, in addition to claiming that the camp was used by the Yugoslav authorities following the war to imprison Ustasha members and regular Home Guard army troops until 1948, then alleged Stalinists until 1951. Its members include journalist Igor Vukić, who wrote his own book advocating the theory, Catholic priest Stjepan Razum and academic Josip Pečarić. The ideas promoted by its members have been amplified by mainstream media interviews and book tours. The last book, "The Jasenovac Lie Revealed" written by Vukić, prompted the Simon Wiesenthal Center to urge Croatian authorities to ban such works, noting that they "would immediately be banned in Germany and Austria and rightfully so". In 2016, Croatian filmmaker Jakov Sedlar released a documentary Jasenovac – The Truth which advocated the same theories, labelling the camp as a "collection and labour camp". The film contained alleged falsifications and forgeries, in addition to denial of crimes and hate speech towards politicians and journalists.

==== Serbian war crimes in World War II ====
Among far-right and nationalist groups, denial and revisionism of Serbian war crimes are carried out through the downplaying of Milan Nedić and Dimitrije Ljotić's roles in the extermination of Serbia's Jews in concentration camps, in the German-occupied Territory of the Military Commander in Serbia by a number of Serbian historians. Serbian collaborationist armed forces were involved, either directly or indirectly, in the mass killings of Jews as well as Roma and those Serbs who sided with any anti-German resistance and the killing of many Croats and Muslims. Since the end of the war, Serbian collaboration in the Holocaust has been the subject of historical revisionism by Serbian leaders. In 1993, the Serbian Academy of Sciences and Arts listed Nedić among The 100 most prominent Serbs. There is also the denial of Chetnik collaboration with Axis forces and crimes committed during World War II. Serbian historian Jelena Djureinovic states in her book The Politics of Memory of the Second World War in Contemporary Serbia: Collaboration, Resistance and Retribution that "during those years, the WWII nationalist Chetniks have been recast as an anti-fascist movement equivalent to Tito's Partisans, and as victims of communism". The glorification of the Chetnik movement has now become the central theme of Serbia's WWII memory politics. Chetnik leaders convicted under communist rule of collaboration with the Nazis have been rehabilitated by Serbian courts, and television programmes have contributed to spreading a positive image of the movement, "distorting the real picture of what happened during WWII".

==== Serbian war crimes in the Yugoslav wars ====
There have been a number of far-right and nationalist authors and political activists who have publicly disagreed with mainstream views of Serbian war crimes in the Yugoslav wars of 1991–1999. Some high-ranked Serbian officials and political leaders who categorically claimed that no genocide against Bosnian Muslims took place at all, include former president of Serbia Tomislav Nikolić, Bosnian Serb leader Milorad Dodik, Serbian Minister of Defence Aleksandar Vulin and Serbian far-right leader Vojislav Šešelj. Among the points of contention are whether the victims of massacres such as the Račak massacre and Srebrenica massacre were unarmed civilians or armed resistance fighters, whether death and rape tolls were inflated, and whether prison camps such as Sremska Mitrovica camp were sites of mass war crimes. These authors are called "revisionists" by scholars and organizations, such as ICTY.

The Report about Case Srebrenica by Darko Trifunovic, commissioned by the government of the Republika Srpska, was described by the International Criminal Tribunal for the former Yugoslavia as "one of the worst examples of revisionism in relation to the mass executions of Bosnian Muslims committed in Srebrenica in July 1995". Outrage and condemnation by a wide variety of Balkan and international figures eventually forced the Republika Srpska to disown the report. In 2017 legislation that banned the teaching of the Srebrenica genocide and Sarajevo siege in schools was introduced in Republika Srpska, initiated by President Milorad Dodik and his SNSD party, who stated that it was "impossible to use here the textbooks ... which say the Serbs have committed genocide and kept Sarajevo under siege. This is not correct and this will not be taught here". In 2019 Republika Srpska authorities appointed Israeli historian Gideon Greif – who has worked at Yad Vashem for more than three decades – to head its own revisionist commission to "determine the truth" about Srebrenica.

==== Massacres of Poles in Volhynia and Eastern Galicia ====
The issue of the Volyn massacres was largely non-existent in Ukrainian scholarly literature for many years, and until very recently, Ukrainian historiography did not undertake any objective research of the events in Volyn. Until 1991 any independent Ukrainian historic research was only possible abroad, mainly in the US and the Canadian diaspora. Despite publishing a number of works devoted to the history of UPA, the Ukrainian emigration researchers (with only few exceptions) remained completely mute about the Volyn events for many years. Until very recently much of the remaining documentation was closed in Ukrainian state archives, unavailable to researchers. As a result, Ukrainian historiography lacks broader reliable research of the events and the presence of the issue in Ukrainian publications is still very limited.

In September 2016, after Poland's Sejm had passed a resolution declaring 11 July a National Day of Remembrance of the victims of the Genocide of the Citizens of the Polish Republic committed by Ukrainian Nationalists and formally called the Massacres of Poles in Volhynia and Eastern Galicia a genocide, the Verkhovna Rada of Ukraine passed a resolution condemning "the one-sided political assessment of the historical events in Poland", rejecting the term "genocide".

==== Indonesian mass killings of 1965–66 ====
Discussion of the killings was taboo in Indonesia and, if mentioned at all, usually called peristiwa enam lima, the "incident of '65." Inside and outside Indonesia, public discussion of the killings increased during the 1990s and especially after 1998 when the New Order government collapsed. Jailed and exiled members of the Sukarno regime, as well as ordinary people, told their stories in increasing numbers. Foreign researchers began to publish increasingly more on the topic, with the end of the military regime and its doctrine of coercing such research attempts into futility.

The killings are skipped over in most Indonesian histories and have been scarcely examined by Indonesians, and has received comparatively little international attention. Indonesian textbooks typically depict the killings as a "patriotic campaign" that resulted in less than 80,000 deaths. In 2004, the textbooks were briefly changed to include the events, but this new curriculum discontinued in 2006 following protests from the military and Islamic groups. The textbooks which mentioned the mass killings were subsequently burnt by order of Indonesia's Attorney General. John Roosa's Pretext for Mass Murder (2006) was initially banned by the Attorney General's Office. The Indonesian parliament set up a truth and reconciliation commission to analyse the killings, but it was suspended by the Indonesian High Court. An academic conference regarding the killings was held in Singapore in 2009. A hesitant search for mass graves by survivors and family members began after 1998, although little has been found. Over three decades later, great enmity remains in Indonesian society over the events.

==== Turkey and the Armenian genocide ====
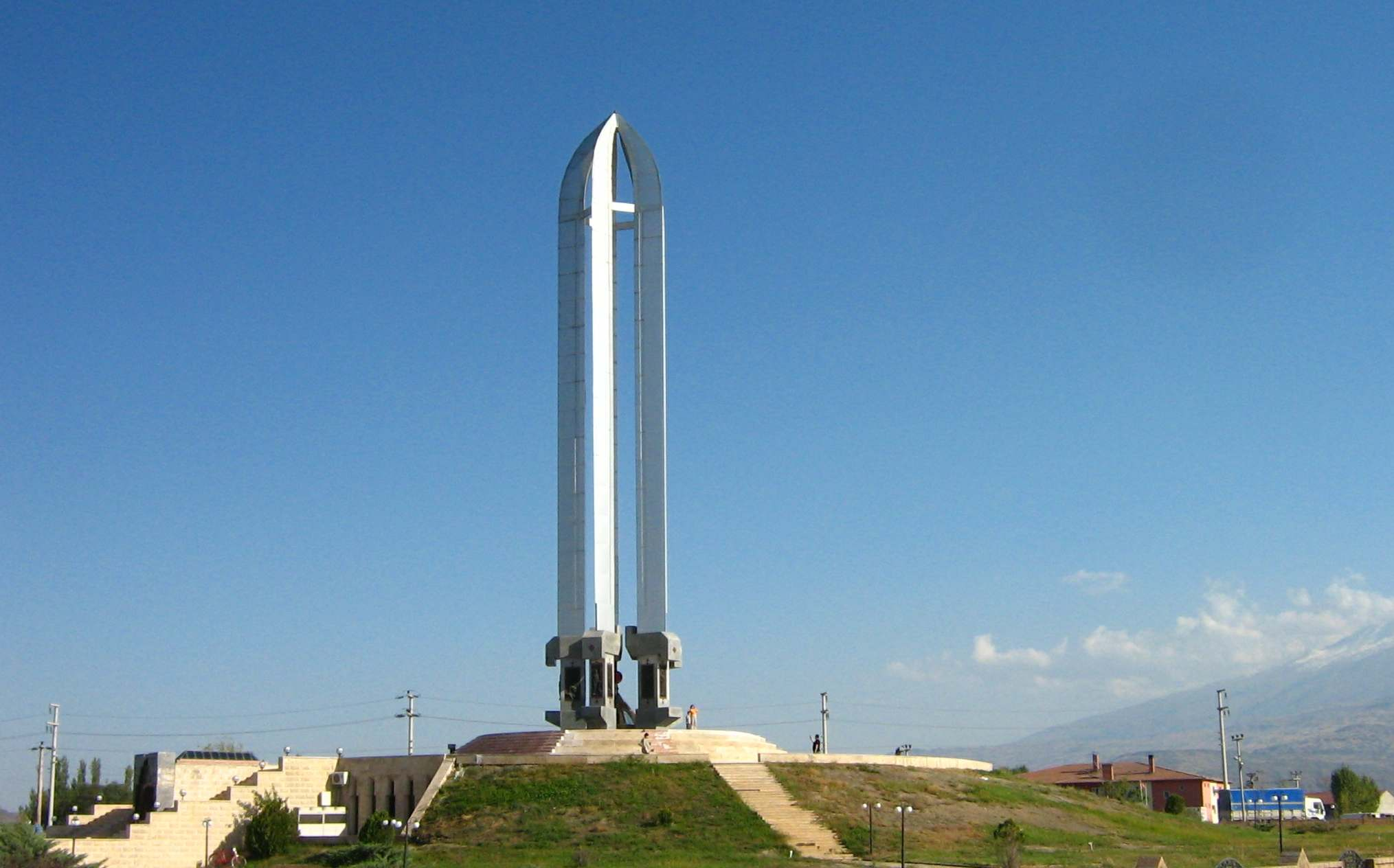
The Iğdır Genocide Memorial and Museum's promotion of the view that Armenians committed genocide against Turks, rather than vice versa, has received international condemnation for falsifying the history surrounding those Armenians killed.

Turkish laws such as Article 301, that state "a person who publicly insults Turkishness, or the Republic or [the] Turkish Grand National Assembly of Turkey, shall be punishable by imprisonment", were used to criminally charge the writer Orhan Pamuk with disrespecting Turkey, for saying that "Thirty thousand Kurds, and a million Armenians, were killed in these lands, and nobody, but me, dares to talk about it". The controversy occurred as Turkey was first vying for membership in the European Union (EU) where the suppression of dissenters is looked down upon. Article 301 originally was part of penal-law reforms meant to modernize Turkey to European Union standards, as part of negotiating Turkey's accession to the EU. In 2006, the charges were dropped due to pressure from the European Union and United States on the Turkish government.

On 7 February 2006, five journalists were tried for insulting the judicial institutions of the State, and for aiming to prejudice a court case (per Article 288 of the Turkish penal code). The reporters were on trial for criticizing the court-ordered closing of a conference in Istanbul regarding the Armenian genocide during the time of the Ottoman Empire. The conference continued elsewhere, transferring locations from a state to a private university. The trial continued until 11 April 2006, when four of the reporters were acquitted. The case against the fifth journalist, Murat Belge, proceeded until 8 June 2006, when he was also acquitted. The purpose of the conference was to critically analyse the official Turkish view of the Armenian genocide in 1915; a taboo subject in Turkey. The trial proved to be a test case between Turkey and the European Union; the EU insisted that Turkey should allow increased freedom of expression rights, as a condition to membership.

==== South Korean war crimes in Vietnam ====
At the request of the United States, South Korea under Park Chung Hee sent approximately 320,000 South Korean troops to fight alongside the United States and South Vietnam during the Vietnam War. Various civilian groups have accused the South Korean military of many "My Lai-style massacres", while the Korean Ministry of Defense has denied all such accusations. Korean forces are alleged to have perpetrated the Binh Tai, Bình An/Tây Vinh, Bình Hòa, and Hà My massacres and several other massacres across Vietnam, killing as many as 9000 Vietnamese civilians.

In 2023, a South Korean court ruled in favour of a Vietnamese victim of South Korean atrocities during the war and ordered that the South Korean government compensate the surviving victim. In response, the South Korean government repeated its earlier denials of the atrocities, and later announced its appeal of the decision. This strained relations with Vietnam, as a spokesperson for Vietnam's fording ministry called the decision "extremely regrettable".

=== Iran ===
The Islamic Republic of Iran uses historical negationism against religious minorities in order to maintain legitimacy and relevancy of the regime. One example is the regime's approach to the Baháʼí community. In 2008, an erroneous and misleading biography of Báb was presented to all primary school children.

In his official 2013 Nowruz address, Supreme Leader of Iran Grand Ayatollah Ali Khamenei questioned the veracity of the Holocaust, remarking that "The Holocaust is an event whose reality is uncertain and if it has happened, it's uncertain how it has happened." This was consistent with Khamenei's previous comments regarding the Holocaust.

=== Soviet and Russian history ===
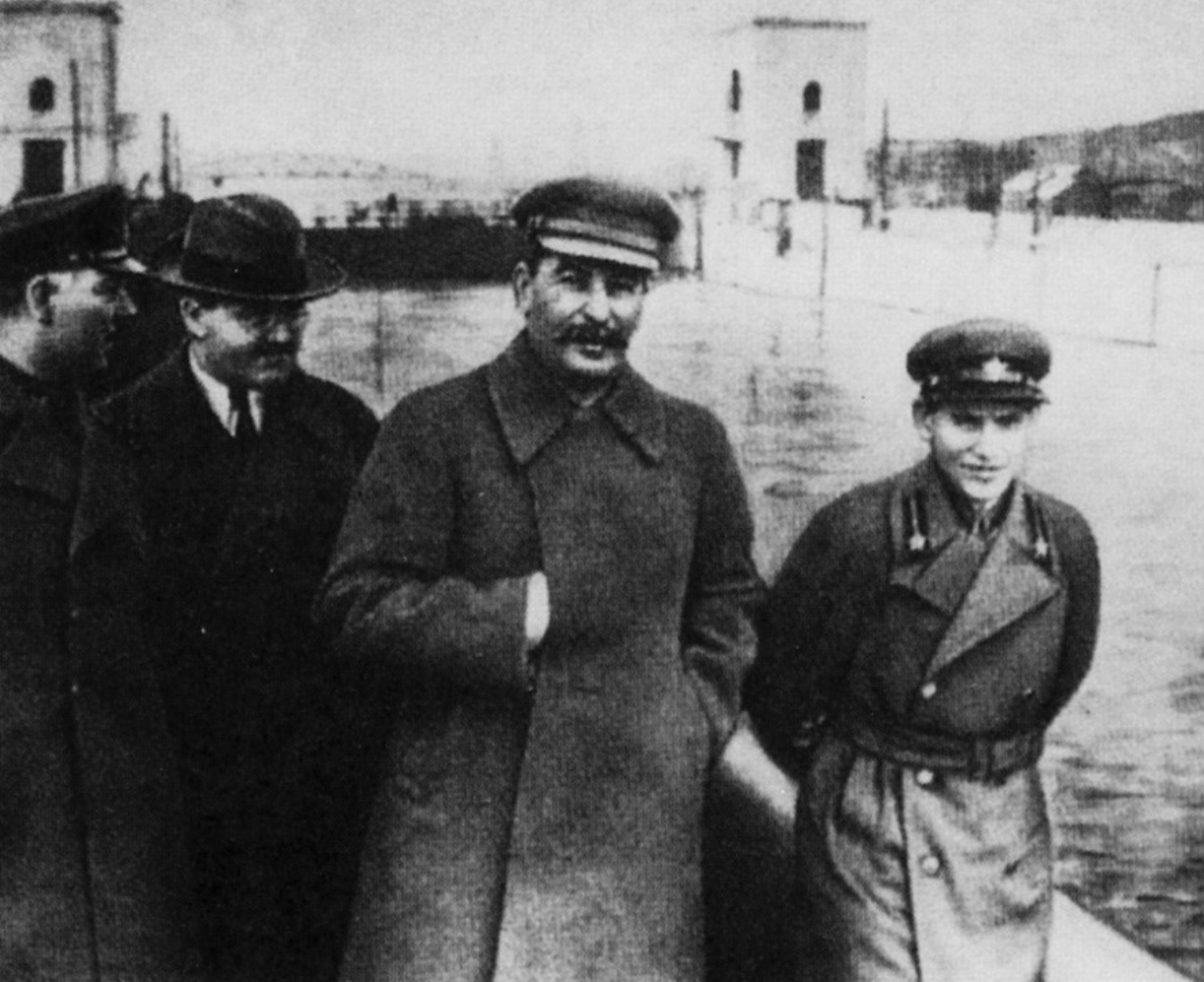

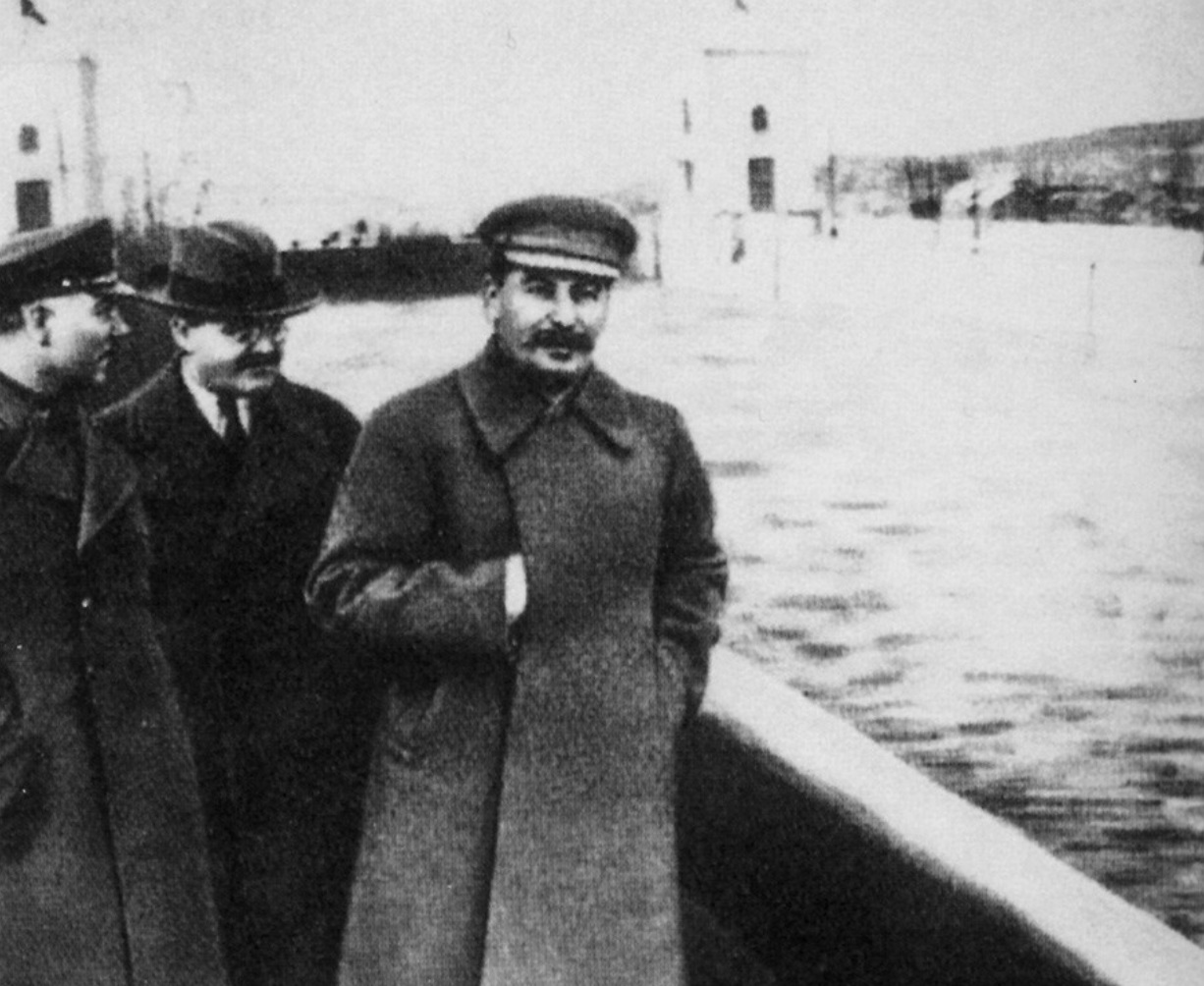
Nikolai Yezhov walking with Stalin in the top photo from the mid 1930s. Following his execution in 1940, Yezhov was edited out of the photo by Soviet censors.

In his book, The Stalin School of Falsification, Leon Trotsky cited a range of historical documents such as private letters, telegrams, party speeches, meeting minutes, and suppressed texts such as Lenin's Testament, to argue that the Stalinist faction routinely distorted political events, forged a theoretical basis for irreconcilable concepts such as the notion of "Socialism in One Country" and misrepresented the views of opponents. He also argued that the Stalinist regime employed an array of professional historians as well as economists to justify policy manoeuvering and safeguarding its own set of material interests.

During the existence of the Russian Soviet Federative Socialist Republic (1917–1991) and the Soviet Union (1922–1991), the Communist Party of the Soviet Union (CPSU) attempted to ideologically and politically control the writing of both academic and popular history. These attempts were most successful in the 1934–1952 period. According to Klaus Mehnert, writing in 1952, the Soviet government attempted to control academic historiography (the writing of history by academic historians) to promote ideological and ethno-racial imperialism by Russians. During the 1928–1956 period, modern and contemporary history was generally composed according to the wishes of the CPSU, not the requirements of accepted historiographic method.

During and after the rule of Nikita Khrushchev (1956–1964), Soviet historiographic practice was more complicated. In this period, Soviet historiography was characterized by complex competition between Stalinist and anti-Stalinist Marxist historians. To avoid the professional hazard of politicized history, some historians chose pre-modern, medieval history or classical history, where ideological demands were relatively relaxed and conversation with other historians in the field could be fostered. Prescribed ideology could still introduce biases in historians' work, but not all of Soviet historiography was affected. Control over party history and the legal status of individual ex-party members played a large role in dictating the ideological diversity and thus the faction in power within the CPSU. The official History of the Communist Party of the Soviet Union (Bolsheviks) was revised to delete references to leaders purged from the party, especially during the rule of Joseph Stalin (1922–1953). (Note: An example of changing visual history is the party's motivated practice of altering photographs.)

In the historiography of the Cold War, a controversy over negationist historical revisionism exists, where numerous revisionist scholars in the West have been accused of whitewashing the crimes of Stalinism, overlooking the Katyn massacre in Poland, disregarding the validity of the Venona Project messages with regards to Soviet espionage in the United States, as well as the denial of the Holodomor of 1932–1933.

In 2009, Russia established the Presidential Commission of the Russian Federation to Counter Attempts to Falsify History to the Detriment of Russia's Interests to "defend Russia against falsifiers of history". Some critics, like Heorhiy Kasyanov from the National Academy of Sciences of Ukraine, said the Kremlin was trying to whitewash Soviet history in order to justify its denial of human rights: "It's part of the Russian Federation's policy to create an ideological foundation for what is happening in Russia right now." Historian and author Orlando Figes, a professor at the University of London, who views the new commission is part of a clampdown on historical scholarship, stated: "They're idiots if they think they can change the discussion of Soviet history internationally, but they can make it hard for Russian historians to teach and publish. It's like we're back to the old days." The commission was disestablished in 2012..

=== Azerbaijan ===
==== In relation to Armenia ====
Many scholars, among them Victor Schnirelmann, Willem Floor, Robert Hewsen, George Bournoutian and others state that in Soviet and post-Soviet Azerbaijan since the 1960s there is a practice of revising primary sources on the South Caucasus in which any mention about Armenians is removed. In the revised texts, Armenian is either simply removed or is replaced by Albanian; there are many other examples of such falsifications, all of which have the purpose of creating an impression that historically Armenians were not present in this territory. Willem M. Floor and Hasan Javadi in the English edition of "The Heavenly Rose-Garden: A History of Shirvan & Daghestan" by Abbasgulu Bakikhanov specifically point out to the instances of distortions and falsifications made by Ziya Bunyadov in his Russian translation of this book. According to Bournoutian and Hewsen these distortions are widespread in these works; they thus advise the readers in general to avoid the books produced in Azerbaijan in Soviet and post-Soviet times if these books do not contain the facsimile copy of original sources. Shnirelman thinks that this practice is being realized in Azerbaijan according to state order. Philip L. Kohl brings an example of a theory advanced by Azerbaijani archaeologist Akhundov about Albanian origin of Khachkars as an example of patently false cultural origin myths.

The Armenian cemetery in Julfa, a cemetery near the town of Julfa, in the Nakhchivan exclave of Azerbaijan originally housed around 10,000 funerary monuments. The tombstones consisted mainly of thousands of khachkars, uniquely decorated cross-stones characteristic of medieval Christian Armenian art. The cemetery was still standing in the late 1990s, when the government of Azerbaijan began a systematic campaign to destroy the monuments. After studying and comparing satellite photos of Julfa taken in 2003 and 2009, the American Association for the Advancement of Science came to the conclusion in December 2010 that the cemetery was demolished and levelled. After the director of the Hermitage Museum Mikhail Piotrovsky expressed his protest about the destruction of Armenian khachkars in Julfa, he was accused by Azerbaijanis of supporting the "total falsification of the history and culture of Azerbaijan". Several appeals were filed by both Armenian and international organizations, condemning the Azerbaijani government and calling on it to desist from such activity. In 2006, Azerbaijan barred European Parliament members from investigating the claims, charging them with a "biased and hysterical approach" to the issue and stating that it would only accept a delegation if it visited Armenian-occupied territory as well. In the spring of 2006, a journalist from the Institute for War and Peace Reporting who visited the area reported that no visible traces of the cemetery remained. In the same year, photographs taken from Iran showed that the cemetery site had been turned into a military shooting range. The destruction of the cemetery has been widely described by Armenian sources, and some non-Armenian sources, as an act of "cultural genocide."

In Azerbaijan, the Armenian genocide is officially denied and is considered a hoax. According to the state ideology of Azerbaijan, a genocide of Azerbaijanis, carried out by Armenians and Russians, took place starting from 1813. Mahmudov has claimed that Armenians first appeared in Karabakh in 1828. Azerbaijani academics and politicians have claimed that foreign historians falsify the history of Azerbaijan and criticism was directed towards a Russian documentary about the regions of Karabakh and Nakhchivan and the historical Armenian presence in these areas. According to the institute director of the Azerbaijan National Academy of Sciences Yagub Mahmudov, prior to 1918 "there was never an Armenian state in the South Caucasus". According to Mahmudov, Ilham Aliyev's statement in which he said that "Irevan is our [Azerbaijan's] historic land, and we, Azerbaijanis must return to these historic lands", was based "historical facts" and "historical reality". Mahmudov also stated that the claim that Armenians are the most ancient people in the region is based on propaganda, and said that Armenians are non-natives of the region, having only arrived in the area after Russian victories over Iran and the Ottoman Empire in the first half of the 19th century. The institute director also said: "The Azerbaijani soldier should know that the land under the feet of provocative Armenians is Azerbaijani land. The enemy can never defeat Azerbaijanis on Azerbaijani soil. Those who rule the Armenian state today must fundamentally change their political course. The Armenians cannot defeat us by sitting in our historic city of Irevan."

==== In relation to Iran ====
Historic falsifications in Azerbaijan, in relation to Iran and its history, are "backed by state and state backed non-governmental organizational bodies", ranging "from elementary school all the way to the highest level of universities". As a result of the two Russo-Iranian Wars of the 19th century, the border between what is present-day Iran and the Republic of Azerbaijan was formed. Although there had not been a historical Azerbaijani state to speak of in history, the demarcation, set at the Aras river, left significant numbers of what were later coined "Azerbaijanis" to the north of the Aras river. During the existence of the Azerbaijan SSR, as a result of Soviet-era historical revionism and myth-building, the notion of a "northern" and "southern" Azerbaijan was formulated and spread throughout the Soviet Union. During the Soviet nation building campaign, any event, both past and present, that had ever occurred in what is the present-day Azerbaijan Republic and Iranian Azerbaijan were rebranded as phenomenons of "Azerbaijani culture". Any Iranian ruler or poet that had lived in the area was assigned to the newly rebranded identity of the Transcaucasian Turkophones, in other words "Azerbaijanis". According to Michael P. Croissant: "It was charged that the "two Azerbaijans", once united, were separated artificially by a conspiracy between imperial Russia and Iran". This notion based on illegitimate historic revisionism suited Soviet political purposes well (based on "anti-imperialism"), and became the basis for irredentism among Azerbaijani nationalists in the last years of the Soviet Union, shortly prior to the establishment of the Azerbaijan Republic in 1991.

In Azerbaijan, periods and aspects of Iranian history are usually claimed as being an "Azerbaijani" product in a distortion of history, and historic Iranian figures, such as the Persian poet Nizami Ganjavi are called "Azerbaijanis", contrary to universally acknowledged fact. In the Azerbaijan SSR, forgeries such as an alleged "Turkish divan" and falsified verses were published in order to "Turkify" Nizami Ganjavi. Although this type of irredentism was initially the result of the nation building policy of the Soviets, it became an instrument for "biased, pseudo-academic approaches and political speculations" in the nationalistic aspirations of the young Azerbaijan Republic. In the modern Azerbaijan Republic, historiography is written with the aim of retroactively Turkifying many of the peoples and kingdoms that existed prior to the arrival of Turks in the region, including the Iranian Medes. According to professor of history George Bournoutian:

As noted, in order to construct an Azerbaijani national history and identity based on the territorial definition of a nation, as well as to reduce the influence of Islam and Iran, the Azeri nationalists, prompted by Moscow devised an "Azeri" alphabet, which replaced the Arabo-Persian script. In the 1930s a number of Soviet historians, including the prominent Russian Orientalist, Ilya Petrushevskii, were instructed by the Kremlin to accept the totally unsubstantiated notion that the territory of the former Iranian khanates (except Yerevan, which had become Soviet Armenia) was part of an Azerbaijani nation. Petrushevskii's two important studies dealing with the South Caucasus, therefore, use the term Azerbaijan and Azerbaijani in his works on the history of the region from the sixteenth to the nineteenth centuries. Other Russian academics went even further and claimed that an Azeri nation had existed from ancient times and had continued to the present. Since all the Russian surveys and almost all nineteenth-century Russian primary sources referred to the Muslims who resided in the South Caucasus as "Tatars" and not "Azerbaijanis", Soviet historians simply substituted Azerbaijani for Tatars. Azeri historians and writers, starting in 1937, followed suit and began to view the three-thousand-year history of the region as that of Azerbaijan. The pre-Iranian, Iranian, and Arab eras were expunged. Anyone who lived in the territory of Soviet Azerbaijan was classified as Azeri; hence the great Iranian poet Nezami, who had written only in Persian, became the national poet of Azerbaijan.

Bournoutian adds:

Although after Stalin's death arguments rose between Azerbaijani historians and Soviet Iranologists dealing with the history of the region in ancient times (specifically the era of the Medes), no Soviet historian dared to question the use of the term Azerbaijan or Azerbaijani in modern times. As late as 1991, the Institute of History of the Academy of Sciences of the USSR, published a book by an Azeri historian, in which it not only equated the "Tatars" with the present-day Azeris, but the author, discussing the population numbers in 1842, also included Nakhichevan and Ordubad in "Azerbaijan". The author, just like Petrushevskii, totally ignored the fact that between 1828 and 1921, Nakhichivan and Ordubad were first part of the Armenian Province and then part of the Yerevan guberniia and had only become part of Soviet Azerbaijan, some eight decades later ... Although the overwhelming number of nineteenth-century Russian and Iranian, as well as present-day European historians view the Iranian province of Azarbayjan and the present-day Republic of Azerbaijan as two separate geographical and political entities, modern Azeri historians and geographers view it as a single state that has been separated into "northern" and "southern" sectors and which will be united in the future. ... Since the collapse of the Soviet Union the current Azeri historians have not only continued to use the terms "northern" and "southern" Azerbaijan, but also assert that the present-day Armenian Republic was a part of northern Azerbaijan. In their fury over what they view as the "Armenian occupation" of Nagorno-Karabakh [which incidentally was an autonomous Armenian region within Soviet Azerbaijan], Azeri politicians and historians deny any historic Armenian presence in the South Caucasus and add that all Armenian architectural monuments located in the present-day Republic of Azerbaijan are not Armenian but [Caucasian] Albanian.

=== Korean War ===
Since the start of the Korean War (1950–1953), the government of the Democratic People's Republic of Korea (DPRK, North Korea) has consistently denied launching the attack which began the war, while the government of South Korea has maintained that the North attacked first. The historiography of the DPRK maintains that the war was provoked by South Korea, at the instigation of the United States: "On June 17, Juche 39 [1950] the then U.S. President [Harry S.] Truman sent [John Foster] Dulles as his special envoy to South Korea to examine the anti-North war scenario and give an order to start the attack. On June 18, Dulles inspected the 38th parallel and the war preparations of the 'ROK Army' units. That day he told Syngman Rhee to start the attack on North Korea with the counter-propaganda that North Korea first 'invaded' the south."

In the North Korean view, the U.S. needed the peninsula of Korea as "a bridgehead, for invading the Asian continent, and as a strategic base, from which to fight against national-liberation movements and socialism, and, ultimately, to attain world supremacy."

The DPRK has denied war crimes being committed by the Korean People's Army in the course of the war, but the Workers' Party of Korea (WPK) privately admitted to "excesses" in their earlier campaign against northerners who had collaborated with the enemy – either actually or allegedly – during the US–South Korean occupation of North Korea. Later, the WPK blamed every wartime atrocity upon the U.S. Armed Forces, e.g. the Sinchon Massacre (17 October – 7 December 1950). Facts of the Sinchon Massacre (agreed to have caused the deaths of more than 30,000 people) have been disputed, but the South Korea-based Institute for Korean Historical Studies concluded the massacre was primarily perpetrated by South Korean leader Syngman Rhee's secret police (who accompanied the US invasion force) along with local anti-communists.

The campaign against "collaborators" was attributed to political and ideological manipulations by the U.S.; the high-ranking leader Pak Chang-ok said that the American enemy had "started to use a new method, namely, it donned a leftist garb, which considerably influenced the inexperienced cadres of the Party and government organs." Kathryn Weathersby's Soviet Aims in Korea and the Origins of the Korean War, 1945–1950: New Evidence from Russian Archives (1993) confirmed that the Korean War was launched by order of Kim Il Sung (1912–1994); and also refuted the DPRK's allegations of biological warfare in the Korean War. The Korean Central News Agency dismissed the historical record of Soviet documents as "sheer forgery".

=== Holocaust denial ===
Holocaust deniers usually reject the term Holocaust denier as an inaccurate description of their historical point of view, instead preferring the term Holocaust revisionist; nonetheless, scholars prefer "Holocaust denier" to differentiate deniers from legitimate historical revisionists, whose goal is to accurately analyse historical evidence with established methods. (Note: To clarify the terminology of denial vs. revisionism, see: "This is the phenomenon of what has come to be known as 'revisionism', 'negationism', or 'Holocaust denial,' whose main characteristic is either an outright rejection of the very veracity of the Nazi genocide of the Jews, or at least a concerted attempt to minimize both its scale and importance ... It is just as crucial, however, to distinguish between the wholly objectionable politics of denial and the fully legitimate scholarly revision of previously accepted conventional interpretations of any historical event, including the Holocaust." Bartov, Omer. The Holocaust: Origins, Implementation and Aftermath, Routledge, pp. 11–12. Bartov is John P. Birkelund Distinguished Professor of European History at the Watson Institute, and is regarded as one of the world's leading authorities on genocide ("Omer Bartov", The Watson Institute for International Studies).; "The two leading critical exposés of Holocaust denial in the United States were written by historians Deborah Lipstadt (1993) and Michael Shermer and Alex Grobman (2000). These scholars make a distinction between historical revisionism and denial. Revisionism, in their view, entails a refinement of existing knowledge about a historical event, not a denial of the event itself, that comes through the examination of new empirical evidence or a reexamination or reinterpretation of existing evidence. Legitimate historical revisionism acknowledges a "certain body of irrefutable evidence" or a "convergence of evidence" that suggest that an event – like the black plague, American slavery, or the Holocaust – did in fact occur (Lipstadt 1993:21; Shermer & Grobman 200:34). Denial, on the other hand, rejects the entire foundation of historical evidence ..." Ronald J. Berger. Fathoming the Holocaust: A Social Problems Approach, Aldine Transaction, 2002, ISBN 0-202-30670-4, p. 154.; "At this time, in the mid-1970s, the specter of Holocaust Denial (masked as "revisionism") had begun to raise its head in Australia ..." Bartrop, Paul R. "A Little More Understanding: The Experience of a Holocaust Educator in Australia" in Samuel Totten, Steven Leonard Jacobs, Paul R Bartrop. Teaching about the Holocaust, Praeger/Greenwood, 2004, p. xix. ISBN 0-275-98232-7; "Pierre Vidal-Naquet urges that denial of the Holocaust should not be called 'revisionism' because 'to deny history is not to revise it'. Les Assassins de la Memoire. Un Eichmann de papier et autres essays sur le revisionisme (The Assassins of Memory – A Paper-Eichmann and Other Essays on Revisionism) 15 (1987)." Cited in Roth, Stephen J. "Denial of the Holocaust as an Issue of Law" in the Israel Yearbook on Human Rights, Vol. 23, Martinus Nijhoff Publishers, 1993, ISBN 0-7923-2581-8, p. 215.; "This essay describes, from a methodological perspective, some of the inherent flaws in the "revisionist" approach to the history of the Holocaust. It is not intended as a polemic, nor does it attempt to ascribe motives. Rather, it seeks to explain the fundamental error in the "revisionist" approach, as well as why that approach of necessity leaves no other choice. It concludes that "revisionism" is a misnomer because the facts do not accord with the position it puts forward and, more importantly, its methodology reverses the appropriate approach to historical investigation ..."Revisionism" is obliged to deviate from the standard methodology of historical pursuit because it seeks to mold facts to fit a preconceived result, it denies events that have been objectively and empirically proved to have occurred, and because it works backward from the conclusion to the facts, thus necessitating the distortion and manipulation of those facts where they differ from the preordained conclusion (which they almost always do). In short, "revisionism" denies something that demonstrably happened, through methodological dishonesty." McFee, Gordon. "Why 'Revisionism' Isn't", The Holocaust History Project, 15 May 1999. Retrieved 15 August 2016.; "Crucial to understanding and combating Holocaust denial is a clear distinction between denial and revisionism. One of the more insidious and dangerous aspects of contemporary Holocaust denial, a la Arthur Butz, Bradley Smith and Greg Raven, is the fact that they attempt to present their work as reputable scholarship under the guise of 'historical revisionism.' The term 'revisionist' permeates their publications as descriptive of their motives, orientation and methodology. In fact, Holocaust denial is in no sense 'revisionism,' it is denial ... Contemporary Holocaust deniers are not revisionists – not even neo-revisionists. They are Deniers. Their motivations stem from their neo-Nazi political goals and their rampant antisemitism." Austin, Ben S. "Deniers in Revisionists Clothing", The Holocaust\Shoah Page, Middle Tennessee State University. Retrieved 29 March 2007.; "Holocaust denial can be a particularly insidious form of antisemitism precisely because it often tries to disguise itself as something quite different: as genuine scholarly debate (in the pages, for example, of the innocuous-sounding Journal for Historical Review). Holocaust deniers often refer to themselves as 'revisionists', in an attempt to claim legitimacy for their activities. There are, of course, a great many scholars engaged in historical debates about the Holocaust whose work should not be confused with the output of the Holocaust deniers. Debate continues about such subjects as, for example, the extent and nature of ordinary Germans' involvement in and knowledge of the policy of genocide, and the timing of orders given for the extermination of the Jews. However, the valid endeavour of historical revisionism, which involves the re-interpretation of historical knowledge in the light of newly emerging evidence, is a very different task from that of claiming that the essential facts of the Holocaust, and the evidence for those facts, are fabrications." The nature of Holocaust denial: What is Holocaust denial?, JPR report No. 3, 2000. Retrieved 16 May 2007.) Historian Alan Berger reports that Holocaust deniers argue in support of a preconceived theory – that the Holocaust either did not occur or was mostly a hoax – by ignoring extensive historical evidence to the contrary.

When the author David Irving (Note: Further information of how Irving was discredited as a historian: "In 1969, after David Irving's support for Rolf Hochhuth, the German playwright who accused Winston Churchill of murdering the Polish wartime leader General Sikorski, The Daily Telegraph issued a memo to all its correspondents. 'It is incorrect,' it said, 'to describe David Irving as a historian. In future we should describe him as an author.'" Ingram, Richard. Irving was the author of his own downfall, The Independent, 25 February 2006.; "It may seem an absurd semantic dispute to deny the appellation of 'historian' to someone who has written two dozen books or more about historical subjects. But if we mean by historian someone who is concerned to discover the truth about the past, and to give as accurate a representation of it as possible, then Irving is not a historian. Those in the know, indeed, are accustomed to avoid the term altogether when referring to him and use some circumlocution such as 'historical writer' instead. Irving is essentially an ideologue who uses history for his own political purposes; he is not primarily concerned with discovering and interpreting what happened in the past, he is concerned merely to give a selective and tendentious account of it in order to further his own ideological ends in the present. The true historian's primary concern, however, is with the past. That is why, in the end, Irving is not a historian." Irving vs. (1) Lipstadt and (2) Penguin Books, Expert Witness Report by Richard J. Evans FBA, Professor of Modern History, University of Cambridge, 2000, Chapter 6.; "State prosecutor Michael Klackl said: 'He's not a historian, he's a falsifier of history.'" Traynor, Ian. Irving jailed for denying Holocaust, The Guardian, 21 February 2006.; "One of Britain's most prominent speakers on Muslim issues is today exposed as a supporter of David Irving. ... Bukhari contacted the discredited historian, sentenced this year to three years in an Austrian prison for Holocaust denial, after reading his website." Doward, Jamie. "Muslim leader sent funds to Irving", The Guardian, 19 November 2006.; "David Irving, the discredited historian and Nazi apologist, was last night starting a three-year prison sentence in Vienna for denying the Holocaust and the gas chambers of Auschwitz." Traynor, Ian. "Irving jailed for denying Holocaust", The Guardian, 21 February 2006.; "Conclusion on meaning 2.15 (vi): that Irving is discredited as a historian." David Irving v. Penguin Books and Deborah Lipstadt/II.; "DAVID Irving, the discredited revisionist historian and most outspoken British Holocaust denier, has added further fuel to the controversy over his early release from an Austrian jail by recanting his court statement of regret over his views." Crichton, Torcuil. "Holocaust denier reneges on regret", The Sunday Herald, 24 December 2006.; "Discredited British author David Irving spoke in front of some 250 people at a small theatre on Szabadság tér last Monday." Hodgson, Robert. "Holocaust denier David Irving draws a friendly crowd in Budapest", The Budapest Times, 19 March 2007.; "An account of the 2000–2001 libel trial in the high court of the now discredited historian David Irving, which formed the backdrop for his recent conviction in Vienna for denying the Holocaust." Program Details – David Irving: The London Trial 2006-02-26 17:00:00, BBC Radio 4.; "Yet Irving, a discredited right-wing historian, was described by a High Court judge after a long libel trial as a racist anti-semite who denied the Holocaust." Edwards, Rob. "Anti-green activist in links with Nazi writer; Revealed: campaigner", The Sunday Herald, 5 May 2002.; "'The sentence against Irving confirms that he and his views are discredited, but as a general rule I don't think that this is the way this should be dealt with,' said Antony Lerman, director of the London-based Institute for Jewish Policy Research. 'It is better to combat denial by education and using good speech to drive out bad speech.'" Gruber, Ruth Ellen. "Jail sentence for Holocaust denier spurs debate on free speech", J. The Jewish News of Northern California, 24 February 2006.; "Deborah Lipstadt is Dorot Professor of Modern Jewish and Holocaust Studies and director of The Rabbi Donald A. Tam Institute for Jewish Studies at Emory University. She is the author of two books about the Holocaust. Her book Denying the Holocaust: The Growing Assault on Truth and Memory led to the 2000 court case in which she defeated and discredited Holocaust denier David Irving." Understanding Auschwitz Today, Task of Justice & Danger of Holocaust Deniers, Public Broadcasting Service.; "After the discredited British historian David Irving was sentenced to a three-year jail term in Austria as a penalty for denying the Holocaust, the liberal conscience of western Europe has squirmed and agonised." Glover, Gillian. "Irving gets just what he wanted – his name in the headlines", The Scotsman, 23 February 2006.; "... is a disciple of discredited historian and Holocaust denier David Irving." Horowitz, David. The Professors: The 101 Most Dangerous Academics in America, Regnery Publishing, 2006, ISBN 0-89526-003-4, p. 175.; "If the case for competence applies to those who lack specialist knowledge, it applies even further to those who have been discredited as incompetent. For example, why ought we include David Irving in a debate aiming to establish the truth about the Holocaust, after a court has found that he manipulates and misinterprets history?" Long, Graham. Relativism and the Foundations of Liberalism, Imprint Academic, 2004, ISBN 1-84540-004-6, p. 80.; "Ironically, Julius is also a celebrated solicitor famous for his defence of Schuchard's colleague, Deborah Lipstadt, against the suit for of libel brought by the discredited historian David Irving brought when Lipstadt accused him of denying the Holocaust." "T S Eliot's anti-Semitism hotly debated as scholars argue over new evidence", University of York, Communications Office, 5 February 2003.; "Irving, a discredited historian, has insisted that Jews at Auschwitz were not gassed." "Irving vows to continue denial", Breaking News, Jewish Telegraphic Agency, 7 February 2007.; "David Irving, the discredited historian and Nazi apologist, was on Monday night starting a three-year prison sentence in Vienna for denying the Holocaust and the gas chambers of Auschwitz." "Historian jailed for denying Holocaust", Mail & Guardian, 21 February 2006.; "Irving, a discredited historian, has insisted that Jews at Auschwitz were not gassed." "Irving Vows To Continue Denial", The Jewish Week, 29 December 2006.; "The two best-known present-day Holocaust deniers are the discredited historian David Irving, jailed last year in Austria for the offence, and the Iranian President Mahmoud Ahmadinejad, who wants Israel wiped off the map." Wills, Clair. " Ben Kiely and the 'Holocaust denial'", Irish Independent, 10 March 2007.; "[Irving] claimed that Lipstadt's book accuses him of falsifying historical facts to support his theory that the Holocaust never happened. This of course discredited his reputation as a historian. ... On 11 April, High Court judge Charles Gray ruled against Irving, concluding that he qualified as a Holocaust denier and anti-Semite, and that as such he distorted history to defend his hero, Adolf Hitler." Wyden, Peter. The Hitler Virus: the Insidious Legacy of Adolf Hitler, Arcade Publishing, 2001, ISBN 1-55970-532-9, p. 164.; "Now that holocaust denier David Irving has been discredited, what is the future of history?" Kustow, Michael. "History after Irving", Red Pepper, June 2000.; "In Britain, which does not have a Holocaust denial law, Irving had already been thoroughly discredited when he unsuccessfully sued historian Deborah Lipstadt in 1998 for describing him as a Holocaust denier." Callamard, Agnès. "Debate: can we say what we want?", Le Monde diplomatique, April 2007.; "Holocaust denier and discredited British historian David Irving, for example, asserts. ... that Auschwitz gas chambers were constructed after World War II." "Hate-Group Web Sites Target Children, Teens", Psychiatric News, American Psychiatric Association, 2 February 2001.; "Holocaust denier: An Austrian court hears discredited British historian David Irving's appeal against his jail sentence for denying the Nazi genocide of the Jews.", "The world this week", BBC News, 20 December 2006.; "Discredited British historian David Irving began serving three years in an Austrian prison yesterday for denying the Holocaust, a crime in the country where Hitler was born." Schofield, Matthew. "Controversial Nazi apologist backs down, but still jailed for three years", The Age, 22 February 2006.) lost his English libel case against Deborah Lipstadt, and her publisher, Penguin Books, and thus was publicly discredited and identified as a Holocaust denier, the trial judge, Justice Charles Gray, concluded that "Irving has, for his own ideological reasons, persistently and deliberately misrepresented and manipulated historical evidence; that, for the same reasons, he has portrayed Hitler in an unwarrantedly favorable light, principally in relation to his attitude towards, and responsibility for, the treatment of the Jews; that he is an active Holocaust denier; that he is anti-semitic and racist, and that he associates with right-wing extremists who promote neo-Nazism."

On 20 February 2006, Irving was found guilty, and sentenced to three years imprisonment for Holocaust denial, under Austria's 1947 law banning Nazi revivalism and criminalizing the "public denial, belittling or justification of National Socialist crimes". Besides Austria, eleven other countries – including Belgium, France, Germany, Lithuania, Poland, and Switzerland – have criminalized Holocaust denial as punishable with imprisonment. (Note: Laws against denying the Holocaust: Philip Johnston "Britons face extradition (to Germany) for 'thought crime' on net" in The Daily Telegraph, 18 February 2003; Brendan O'Neill "Irving? Let the guy go home" [from Austria] BBC 4 January 2006; Malte Herwig The Swastika Wielding Provocateur in Der Spiegel 16 January 2006; "German neo-Nazi revisionist Zuendel goes on trial". European Jewish Press. 12 February 2006. Archived from the original on 22 February 2006.; 14 July 1990 Act prohibiting racist, antisemitic and xenophobic acts – loi Gayssot; "Row over anti-revisionist laws". 4 January 2006. Archived from the original on 2 March 2006.; "Belgian Holocaust denier held at Schiphol". Expatica News. 5 August 2005. Archived from the original on 16 May 2006.; About Switzerland laws by the Stephen Roth Institute for the Study of Antisemitism and Racism; Philip Johnston, "Blair's pledge on Holocaust denial law abandoned" in The Daily Telegraph, 21 January 2000 and Lithuania.; Slovak laws on fines and imprisonment for denying and approving of the Holocaust, the crimes of totalitarian political regimes and crimes against humanity, Slov.-lex.sk, access date 3 February 2026)

=== North Macedonia ===
According to Eugene N. Borza, the Macedonians are in search of their past to legitimize their unsure present, in the disorder of the Balkan politics. Ivaylo Dichev claims that the Macedonian historiography has the impossible task of filling the huge gaps between the ancient kingdom of Macedon, that collapsed in 2nd century BC, the 10th–11th century state of the Cometopuls, and the Yugoslav Macedonia established in the middle of the 20th century. According to Ulf Brunnbauer, modern Macedonian historiography is highly politicized, because the Macedonian nation-building process is still in development. The recent nation-building project imposes the idea of a "Macedonian nation" with unbroken continuity from the antiquity (Ancient Macedonians) to the modern times, which has been criticized by some domestic and foreign scholars for ahistorically projecting modern ethnic distinctions into the past. In this way generations of students were educated in pseudohistory.

=== Historiography in Africa ===
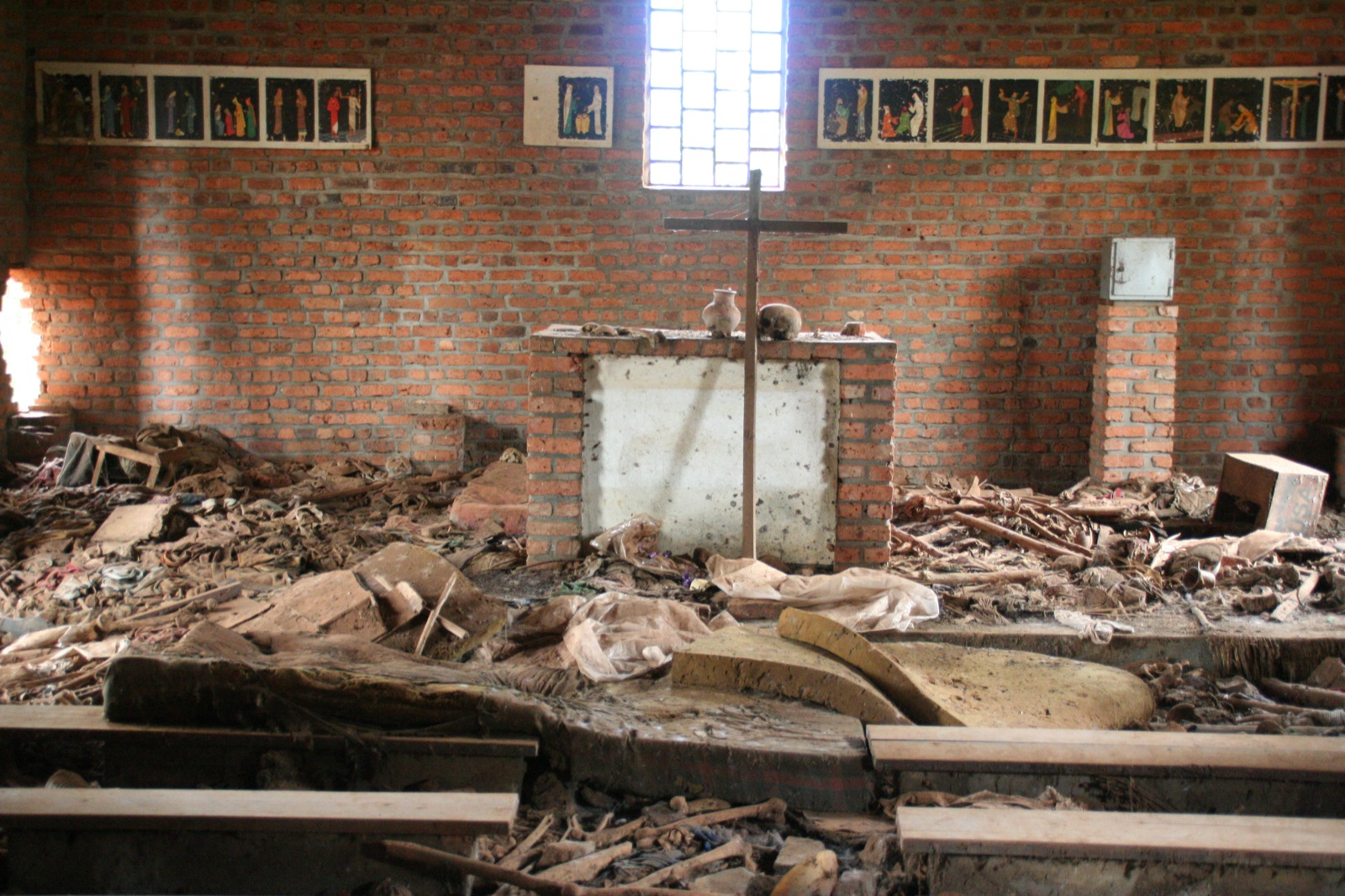
During the Rwandan genocide, over five-thousand people seeking refuge in the then Ntarama church were killed by grenade, machete, rifle, or burnt alive.

Rwandan genocide denial has proliferated in multiple contexts despite the fact that the mass killings took place amidst widespread news coverage and additionally later received detailed study during the International Criminal Tribunal for Rwanda (ICTR). Perpetrators of violent attacks against civilians in Rwanda, known as the "génocidaires", have been an element of this controversy. Concentrated details involving the planning, financing, and progress of war crimes have gotten unearthed, yet campaigns of denial endure given the influences of extremist ideologies surrounding ethnicity and race.

In May 2020, the Los Angeles Review of Books interviewed legal advocate and writer Linda Melvern on the topic, with her having assisted with ICTR related prosecutions. She concluded that the "pernicious influence" of the Hutu Power faction that enacted the widespread murders "lives on in rumor, stereotype, lies, and propaganda." She also remarked that said "movement's campaign of genocide denial has confused many, recruited some, and shielded others" such that with "the use of seemingly sound research methods, the génocidaires pose a threat, especially to those who might not be aware of the historical facts."

In terms of the 21st Century, increased international debate and discussion have partially failed to prevent efforts obfuscating the facts surrounding the Sudanese genocide. In March 2010, Omer Ismail and John Prendergast wrote for the Christian Science Monitor warning of multiple distortions of reality with lasting implications given the actions of the then Khartoum-based government. Specifically, they alleged that the state had "systematically denied access to the United Nations/African Union observer mission [personnel] to investigate attacks on civilians, so many of these attacks go unreported and the culpability remains mysterious."

Historical negationism within the territories of multiple African nations constitutes a crime from a de jure legal perspective. For example, denying the Rwandan genocide has led to prosecutions in that country. However, the negative social affects from disinformation and misinformation have expanded in some cases using modern media.

=== In textbooks ===
==== Japan ====
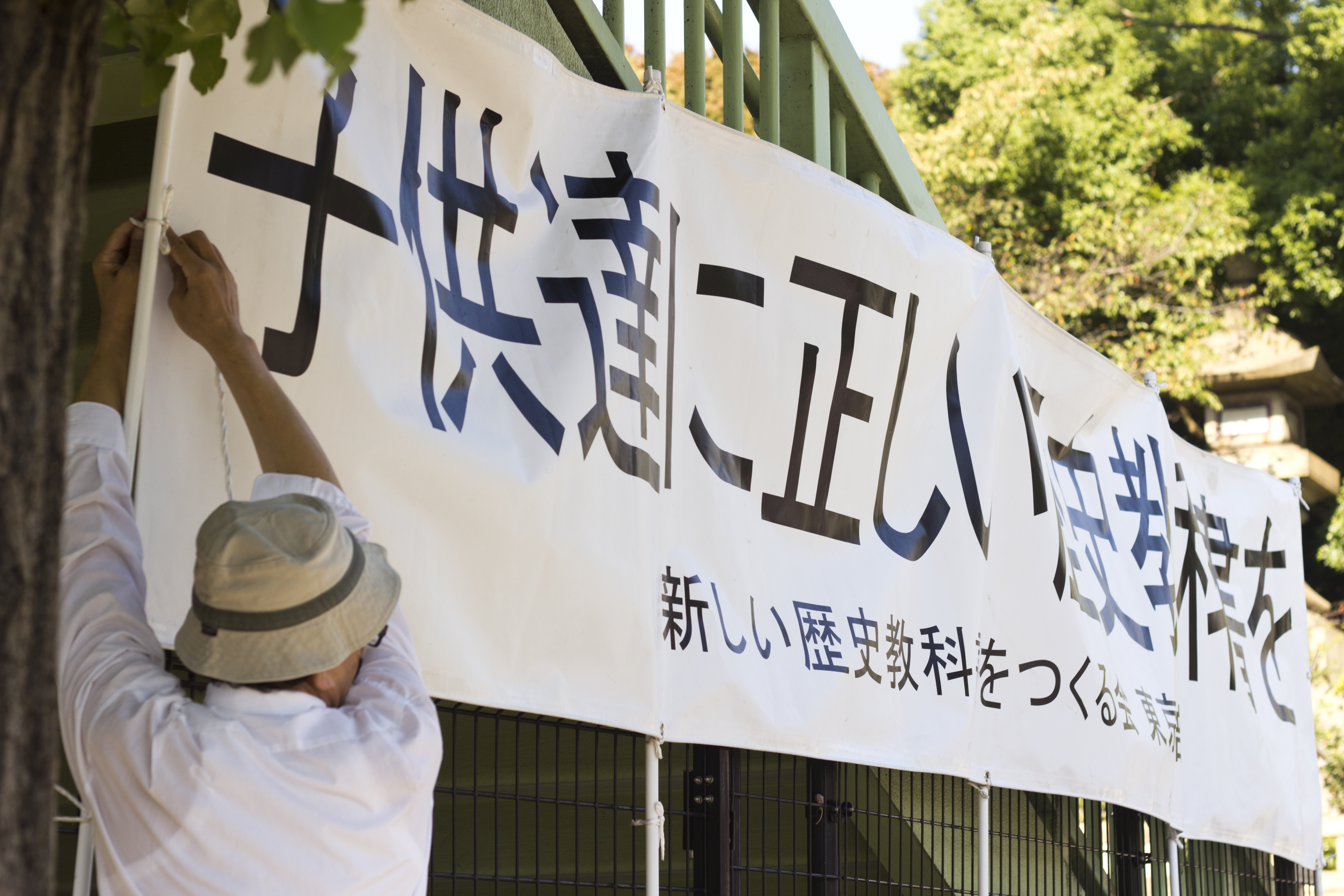
A member of the revisionist group “Japanese Society for History Textbook Reform” erects a banner reading "[Give] the Children Correct History Textbooks".

The history textbook controversy centres upon the secondary school history textbook Atarashii Rekishi Kyōkasho ("New History Textbook") said to minimize the ruthless nature of Japanese militarism in the First Sino-Japanese War (1894–1895), in annexing Korea in 1910, in the Second Sino-Japanese War (1937–1945), and in the Pacific Theater of World War II (1941–1945). The conservative Japanese Society for History Textbook Reform commissioned the Atarashii Rekishi Kyōkasho textbook with the purpose of traditional national and international view of that Japanese historical period. The Ministry of Education vets all history textbooks, especially those containing references to imperialist atrocities due to a special provision in the textbook examination rules to avoid inflaming controversy with neighbouring countries; however, the Atarashii Rekishi Kyōkasho de-emphasizes aggressive Japanese Imperial wartime behaviour and the matter of Chinese and Korean comfort women. When it comes to the Nanking massacre, the textbook only refers to it as the Nanking Incident, mentioning there were civilian casualties without delving into specifics, and mentioning it again in relation to the Tokyo tribunal, stating that there are multiple opinions about the topic with controversies continuing to this day (see Nanking massacre denial). In 2007, the Ministry of Education attempted to revise textbooks regarding the Battle of Okinawa, lessening the involvement of the Imperial Japanese Army in Okinawan civilian mass suicides.

==== Pakistan ====
Allegations of historical revisionism have been made regarding Pakistani textbooks in that they are laced with Indophobic, Hindu-hating and Islamist bias. Pakistan's use of officially published textbooks has been criticized for using schools to more subtly foster religious extremism, whitewashing Muslim conquests on the Indian subcontinent and promoting "expansive pan-Islamic imaginings" that "detect the beginnings of Pakistan in the birth of Islam on the Arabian peninsula". Since 2001, the Pakistani government has stated that curriculum reforms have been underway by the Ministry of Education.

==== South Korea ====
12 October 2015, South Korea's government has announced controversial plans to control the history textbooks used in secondary schools despite oppositional concerns of people and academics that the decision is made to glorify the history of those who served the Imperial Japanese government (Chinilpa). Section and the authoritarian dictatorships in South Korea during 1960s–1980s.The Ministry of Education announced that it would put the secondary-school history textbook under state control; "This was an inevitable choice in order to straighten out historical errors and end the social dispute caused by ideological bias in the textbooks," Hwang Woo-yea, education minister said on 12 October 2015. According to the government's plan, the current history textbooks of South Korea will be replaced by a single textbook written by a panel of government-appointed historians and the new series of publications would be issued under the title The Correct Textbook of History and are to be issued to the public and private primary and secondary schools in 2017 onwards.

The move has sparked fierce criticism from academics who argue that the system can be used to distort the history and glorify the history of those who served the Imperial Japanese government (Chinilpa) and of the authoritarian dictatorships. Moreover, 466 organizations including Korean Teachers and Education Workers Union formed History Act Network in solidarity and have staged protests: "The government's decision allows the state too much control and power and, therefore, it is against political neutrality that is certainly the fundamental principle of education." Many South Korean historians condemned Kyohaksa for their text glorifying those who served the Imperial Japanese government (Chinilpa) and the authoritarian dictatorship with a far-right political perspective. On the other hand, New Right supporters welcomed the textbook, saying that "the new textbook finally describes historical truths contrary to the history textbooks published by left-wing publishers", and the textbook issue became intensified as a case of ideological conflict. In Korean history, the history textbook was once put under state control during the authoritarian regime under Park Chung Hee (1963–1979), who is a father of Park Geun-hye, former President of South Korea, and was used as a means to keep the Yushin Regime, also known as the Yushin Dictatorship; however, there had been continuous criticisms about the system especially from the 1980s when Korea experienced a dramatic democratic development. In 2003, reformation of textbook began when the textbooks on Korean modern and contemporary history were published though the Textbook Screening System, which allows textbooks to be published not by a single government body but by many different companies, for the first time.

==== Turkey ====
Education in Turkey is centralized, and its policy, administration, and content are each determined by the Turkish government. Textbooks taught in schools are either prepared directly by the Ministry of National Education (MEB) or must be approved by its Instruction and Education Board. In practice, this means that the Turkish government is directly responsible for what textbooks are taught in schools across Turkey. In 2014, Taner Akçam, writing for the Armenian Weekly, discussed 2014–2015 Turkish elementary and middle school textbooks that the MEB had made available on the internet. He found that Turkish history textbooks describe Armenians as people "who are incited by foreigners, who aim to break apart the state and the country, and who murdered Turks and Muslims." The Armenian genocide is referred to as the "Armenian matter", and is described as a lie perpetrated to further the perceived hidden agenda of Armenians. Recognition of the Armenian genocide is defined as the "biggest threat to Turkish national security".

Akçam summarized one textbook that claims the Armenians had sided with the Russians during the war. The 1909 Adana massacre, in which as many as 20,000–30,000 Armenians were massacred, is identified as "The Rebellion of Armenians of Adana". According to the book, the Armenian Hnchak and Dashnak organizations instituted rebellions in many parts of Anatolia, and "didn't hesitate to kill Armenians who would not join them," issuing instructions that "if you want to survive you have to kill your neighbor first." Claims highlighted by Akçam: "[The Armenians murdered] many people living in villages, even children, by attacking Turkish villages, which had become defenseless because all the Turkish men were fighting on the war fronts. ... They stabbed the Ottoman forces in the back. They created obstacles for the operations of the Ottoman units by cutting off their supply routes and destroying bridges and roads. ... They spied for Russia and by rebelling in the cities where they were located, they eased the way for the Russian invasion. ... Since the Armenians who engaged in massacres in collaboration with the Russians created a dangerous situation, this law required the migration of [Armenian people] from the towns they were living in to Syria, a safe Ottoman territory. ... Despite being in the midst of war, the Ottoman state took precautions and measures when it came to the Armenians who were migrating. Their tax payments were postponed, they were permitted to take any personal property they wished, government officials were assigned to ensure that they were protected from attacks during the journey and that their needs were met, police stations were established to ensure that their lives and properties were secure."

Similar revisionist claims found in other textbooks by Akçam included that Armenian "back-stabbing" was the reason the Ottomans lost the Russo-Turkish War of 1877–78 (similar to the post-War German stab-in-the-back myth), that the Hamidian massacres never happened, that the Armenians were armed by the Russians during late World War I to fight the Ottomans (in reality they had already been nearly annihilated from the area by this point), that Armenians killed 600,000 Turks during said war, that the deportation were to save Armenians from other violent Armenian gangs, and that deported Armenians were later allowed to retrieve their possessions and return to Turkey unharmed. As of 2015, Turkish textbooks continue to refer to Armenians as "traitors," deny the genocide, and assert that the Ottoman Turks "took necessary measures to counter Armenian separatism". Students are taught that Armenians were forcibly relocated to defend Turkish nationals from attacks, and Armenians are described as "dishonorable and treacherous".

==== Yugoslavia ====
Throughout the post war era, though Tito denounced nationalist sentiments in historiography, those trends continued with Croat and Serbian academics at times accusing each other of misrepresenting each other's histories, especially in relation to the Croat-Nazi alliance. Communist historiography was challenged in the 1980s and a rehabilitation of Serbian nationalism by Serbian historians began. Historians and other members of the intelligentsia belonging to the Serbian Academy of Sciences and Arts (SANU) and the Writers Association played a significant role in the explanation of the new historical narrative. The process of writing a "new Serbian history" paralleled alongside the emerging ethno-nationalist mobilization of Serbs with the objective of reorganizing the Yugoslav federation. Using ideas and concepts from Holocaust historiography, Serbian historians alongside church leaders applied it to World War Two Yugoslavia and equated the Serbs with Jews and Croats with Nazi Germans.

Chetniks along with the Ustashe were vilified by Tito era historiography within Yugoslavia. In the 1980s, Serbian historians initiated the process of re-examining the narrative of how World War Two was told in Yugoslavia which was accompanied by the rehabilitation of Četnik leader Draža Mihailović. Monographs relating to Mihailović and the Četnik movement were produced by some younger historians who were ideologically close to it towards the end of the 1990s. Being preoccupied with the era, Serbian historians have looked to vindicate the history of the Chetniks by portraying them as righteous freedom fighters battling the Nazis while removing from history books the ambiguous alliances with the Italians and Germans. Whereas the crimes committed by Chetniks against Croats and Muslims in Serbian historiography are overall "cloaked in silence". During the Milošević era, Serbian history was falsified to obscure the role Serbian collaborators Milan Nedić and Dimitrije Ljotić played in cleansing Serbia's Jewish community, killing them in the country or deporting them to Eastern European concentration camps.

In the 1990s following a massive Western media coverage of the Yugoslav Wars, there was a rise of the publications considering the matter on historical revisionism of former Yugoslavia. One of the most prominent authors on the field of historical revisionism in the 1990s considering the newly emerged republics is Noel Malcolm and his works Bosnia: A Short History (1994) and Kosovo: A Short History (1998), that have seen a robust debate among historians following their release; following the release of the latter, the merits of the book were the subject of an extended debate in Foreign Affairs. Critics said that the book was "marred by his sympathies for its ethnic Albanian separatists, anti-Serbian bias, and illusions about the Balkans". In late 1999, Thomas Emmert of the history faculty of Gustavus Adolphus College in Minnesota reviewed the book in Journal of Southern Europe and the Balkans Online and while praising aspects of the book also asserted that it was "shaped by the author's overriding determination to challenge Serbian myths", that Malcolm was "partisan", and also complained that the book made a "transparent attempt to prove that the main Serbian myths are false". In 2006, a study by Frederick Anscombe looked at issues surrounding scholarship on Kosovo such as Noel Malcolm's work Kosovo: A Short History. Anscombe noted that Malcolm offered a "detailed critique of the competing versions of Kosovo's history" and that his work marked a "remarkable reversal" of previous acceptance by Western historians of the "Serbian account" regarding the migration of the Serbs (1690) from Kosovo. Malcolm has been criticized for being "anti-Serbian" and selective like the Serbs with the sources, while other more restrained critics note that "his arguments are unconvincing". Anscombe noted that Malcolm, like Serbian and Yugoslav historians who have ignored his conclusions, sidelines and is unwilling to consider indigenous evidence such as that from the Ottoman archive when composing national history.

=== French law recognizing colonialism's positive value ===
On 23 February 2005, the Union for a Popular Movement conservative majority at the French National Assembly voted a law compelling history textbooks and teachers to "acknowledge and recognize in particular the positive role of the French presence abroad, especially in North Africa". It was criticized by historians and teachers, among them Pierre Vidal-Naquet, who refused to recognize the French Parliament's right to influence the way history is written (despite the French Holocaust denial laws, see Loi Gayssot). That law was also challenged by left-wing parties and the former French colonies; critics argued that the law was tantamount to refusing to acknowledge the racism inherent to French colonialism, and that the law proper is a form of historical revisionism. (Note: In retaliation against the law, Algerian president Abdelaziz Bouteflika refused to sign a prepared "friendly treaty" with France. On 26 June 2005, Bouteflika declared that the law "approached mental blindness, negationism and revisionism". In Martinique, Aimé Césaire, author of the Négritude literary movement, refused to receive UMP leader Nicolas Sarkozy, the incumbent president of France.)

=== Marcos martial law negationism in the Philippines ===
In the Philippines, the biggest examples of historical negationism are linked to the Marcos family dynasty, usually Imelda Marcos, Bongbong Marcos, and Imee Marcos specifically. They have been accused of denying or trivializing the human rights violations during martial law and the plunder of the Philippines' coffers while Ferdinand Marcos was president.

=== Denial of the Muslim conquest of the Iberian peninsula ===
A spin-off of the vision of history espoused by the "inclusive Spanish nationalism" built in opposition to the National-Catholic brand of Spanish nationalism, it was first coined by Ignacio Olagüe (a dilettante historian connected to the early Spanish fascism) particularly in the former's 1974 work La revolución islámica en Occidente ("The Islamic revolution in the West"). Olagüe argued that it was impossible for Arabs to have invaded Hispania in 711 since they had not yet established their dominance over the neighbouring part of North Africa. Instead, Olagüe held that the events of 711 could be explained as skirmishes involving allied North African troops within the context of a civil war pitting Catholic Goths led by Roderic against Goths adhering to some form of Arianism and a largely-nontrinitarian Spanish population, including Nestorians, Gnostics and Manichaeans. The negationist postulates of Olagüe were later adopted by certain sectors within Andalusian nationalism. These ideas were resurrected in the early 21st century by the Arabist Emilio González Ferrín.

=== Australia ===
The Indigenous Australian population plummeted in the Australian frontier wars. The aboriginal people were regarded as lacking any concept of property or land rights: consequently, Australia was considered terra nullius. Massacres and mass poisonings were carried out against indigenous people. Indigenous children were removed from their families in what is known as the Stolen Generations. Several critics like Andrew Bolt and Keith Windschuttle have rejected the scholarly evidence pointing to the genocide against Indigenous Australians and have accused historians like Henry Reynolds and Lyndall Ryan of deliberately fabricating Australian history to suit a political agenda.

=== Nakba ===
Nakba denial is cited by some as a form of historical denialism pertaining to the 1948 Palestinian expulsion and flight and its accompanying effects, which Palestinians refer to collectively as the "Nakba" (lit. 'catastrophe'). Underlying assumptions of Nakba denial cited by scholars can include the denial of historically documented violence against Palestinians, the idea that Palestine was barren land, and the notion that Palestinian dispossession was part of mutual transfers between Arabs and Jews justified by war.

== Ramifications and judicature ==
16 European countries as well as Canada and Israel have criminalized historical negationism of the Holocaust. The Council of Europe defines it as the "denial, gross minimisation, approval or justification of genocide or crimes against humanity" (article 6, Additional Protocol to the Convention on cybercrime).

=== International law ===
Some council-member states proposed an additional protocol to the Council of Europe Cybercrime Convention, addressing materials and "acts of racist or xenophobic nature committed through computer networks"; it was negotiated from late 2001 to early 2002, and, on 7 November 2002, the Council of Europe Committee of Ministers adopted the protocol's final text titled Additional Protocol to the Convention on Cyber-crime, Concerning the Criminalization of Acts of a Racist and Xenophobic Nature Committed through Computer Systems, ("Protocol"). It opened on 28 January 2003, and became current on 1 March 2006; as of 30 November 2011, 20 States have signed and ratified the Protocol, and 15 others have signed, but not yet ratified it (including Canada and South Africa).

The Protocol requires participant States to criminalize the dissemination of racist and xenophobic material, and of racist and xenophobic threats and insults through computer networks, such as the Internet. Article 6, Section 1 of the Protocol specifically covers Holocaust denial, and other genocides recognized as such by international courts, established since 1945, by relevant international legal instruments. Section 2 of Article 6 allows a Party to the Protocol, at their discretion, only to prosecute the violator if the crime is committed with the intent to incite hatred or discrimination or violence; or to use a reservation, by allowing a Party not to apply Article 6 – either partly or entirely. The Council of Europe's Explanatory Report of the Protocol says that the "European Court of Human Rights has made it clear that the denial or revision of 'clearly established historical facts – such as the Holocaust – ... would be removed from the protection of Article 10 by Article 17' of the European Convention on Human Rights" (see the Lehideux and Isorni judgement of 23 September 1998);

Two of the English-speaking states in Europe, Ireland and the United Kingdom, have not signed the additional protocol, (the third, Malta, signed on 28 January 2003, but has not yet ratified it). On 8 July 2005 Canada became the only non-European state to sign the convention. They were joined by South Africa in April 2008. The United States government does not believe that the final version of the Protocol is consistent with the United States' First Amendment Constitutional rights and has informed the Council of Europe that the United States will not become a Party to the protocol.

=== Domestic law ===
There are domestic laws against negationism and hate speech (which may encompass negationism) in several countries, including:

- Austria (Article I §3 Verbotsgesetz 1947 with its 1992 updates and added paragraph §3h).
- Belgium (Belgian Holocaust denial law).
- Czech Republic.
- France (Gayssot Act).
- Germany (§130(3) of the penal code).
- Hungary.
- Israel.
- Lithuania.
- Luxembourg.
- Poland (Article 55 of the law establishing the Institute of National Remembrance 1998).
- Portugal.
- Romania.
- Slovakia.
- Switzerland (Article 261bis of the Penal Code).

Additionally, the Netherlands considers denying the Holocaust as a hate crime – which is a punishable offence. Wider use of domestic laws include the 1990 French Gayssot Act that prohibits any "racist, anti-Semitic or xenophobic" speech, and the Czech Republic and Ukraine have criminalized the denial and the minimization of Communist-era crimes.

== In fiction ==
In the novel Nineteen Eighty-Four (1949) by George Orwell, the government of Oceania continually revises historical records to concord with the contemporary political explanations of The Party. When Oceania is at war with Eurasia, the public records (newspapers, cinema, television) indicate that Oceania has been always at war with Eurasia; yet, when Eurasia and Oceania are no longer fighting each other, the historical records are subjected to negationism; thus, the populace are brainwashed to believe that Oceania and Eurasia always have been allies against Eastasia. The protagonist of the story, Winston Smith, is an editor in the Ministry of Truth, responsible for effecting the continual historical revisionism that will negate the contradictions of the past upon the contemporary world of Oceania. To cope with the psychological stresses of life during wartime, Smith begins a diary, in which he observes that "He who controls the present, controls the past. He who controls the past, controls the future", and so illustrates the principal, ideological purpose of historical negationism.

Franz Kurowski was an extremely prolific right-wing German writer who dedicated his entire career to the production of Nazi military propaganda, followed by post-war military pulp fiction and revisionist histories of World War II, claiming the humane behaviour and innocence of war crimes of the Wehrmacht, glorifying war as a desirable state, while fabricating eyewitness reports of atrocities allegedly committed by the Allies, especially Bomber Command and the air raids on Cologne and Dresden as a planned genocide of the civilian population.

== See also ==
- Academic integrity
- Alternative facts
- Ash heap of history
- Big lie
- Black legend
- Cognitive dissonance
- Damnatio memoriae
- Doublethink
- Dunning School (United States)
- History wars (Australia)
- History wars (Canada)
- Hindutva pseudohistory
- Information warfare
- Memory hole
- National memory
- Selective omission – biases to taboo some elements of a collective memory

=== Cases of denialism ===
- 1776 Commission
- Denial of atrocities against indigenous peoples
- Denial of the Holodomor
- Genocide denial – lists a number of particular cases
- Negationism of the military dictatorship of Chile
- Temple denial
- The 1619 Project
- White Legend
- World War II-related
  - Anti-Katyn
  - Austria victim theory
  - HIAG Waffen-SS revisionism
  - Holocaust denial
  - Italiani brava gente
  - Myth of the clean Wehrmacht

== Sources ==
- Anscombe, Frederick (2006). "The Ottoman Empire in Recent International Politics – II: The Case of Kosovo" (PDF). The International History Review. 28 (4): 758–793. doi:10.1080/07075332.2006.9641103. JSTOR 40109813. S2CID 154724667. Archived from the original (PDF) on 24 September 2019.
- Bećirević, Edina (2014). Genocide on the Drina River. Yale University Press. ISBN 9780300192582 – via Google Books.
- Cohen, Philip J. (1996). Serbia's Secret War: Propaganda and the Deceit of History. College Station, Texas: Texas A&M University Press. ISBN 0-89096-760-1.
- Djilas, Aleksa (September–October 1998). "Imagining Kosovo: A Biased New Account Fans Western Confusion". Foreign Affairs. 77 (5): 124–131. doi:10.2307/20049055. JSTOR 20049055.
- Emmert, Thomas (1999). "Challenging myth in a short history of Kosovo". Journal of Southern Europe and the Balkans Online. 1 (2): 217–221. doi:10.1080/14613199908414002.
- Howe, K (2003). The Quest for Origins – Who First Discovered and Settled New Zealand and the Pacific Islands?. Penguin Books Press. ISBN 9780143008453.
- Perica, Vjekoslav (2002). Balkan idols: Religion and nationalism in Yugoslav states. Oxford University Press. ISBN 9780195174298.
