= Ron Cutler =

Ron Cutler may refer to:

- Ron Cutler (bishop), Canadian Anglican bishop
- Ron Cutler (radio broadcaster), American radio personality and entrepreneur
