= Parcast =

Media production firm

- Type: Podcast network
- Country: United States
- First air date: 2016
- Availability: International
- Owner: Spotify
- Established: 2016
- Official website: parcast.com

Parcast was a digital media firm and podcast network, that specialized in producing scripted podcasts and audio dramas. It was founded in 2016 by podcaster Max Cutler and his father Ron Cutler in Los Angeles California.

In 2019, it was acquired by Sweden-based media firm and streaming service provider Spotify. Spotify spent over $56 million to acquire Parcast; however, the total compensation has been reported to be over $100 million. This makes the Parcast acquisition one of the largest podcasting platform mergers in US history and largest single acquisition deal of Spotify's $400 million acquisition program. In September 2020, employees went public with their union drive at Parcast. A month later, Spotify voluntarily recognized the union. 15 months later, 56 workers of the bargaining unit ratified their first collective agreement, which included a minimum salary of $70,000, annual increases and affirmative action when hiring. On June 5, 2023, Spotify sent a memo to staff announcing that Parcast would be merged with Gimlet Media into a single Spotify Studios division, as part of a restructuring that also included the elimination of 200 jobs.

== History ==
Cutler, a 27-year old graduate of the University of Arizona, launched Parcast in 2016. He was inspired by the hit podcast Serial, itself a spinoff of This American Life. He believed that his network could produce podcasts of comparable quality while saving money on the production of individual episodes.

Parcast's original focus was on producing scripted true crime series, but their scope expanded into the mystery, science fiction, and history genres as well as fictional audio dramas.

Parcast produced over 40 daily and weekly shows, supported by a team of more than 75 voice actors, producers, and scriptwriters. Following a decline in demand for the shows and the anticipated merger of Gimlet Media and Parcast into a single Spotify Studios subsidiary, the firm is expected to be disbanded sometime in 2023.

== Audience ==
According to due diligence performed by Spotify, over 75% of Parcast's audience is female.

== Series produced ==
Title	Hosts / cast members	Genre	Update schedule
Adulting with Teala & Nia	Teala Dunn, Nia Sioux	Society/culture	Wednesdays
Assassinations	Kate Leonard, Bill Thomas	True crime	Mondays
Blind Dating	Tara Michelle Massicotte	Romance	Wednesdays
Cold Cases	Carter Roy	True crime	Mondays
Con Artists	Alastair Murden	True crime	Wednesdays
Conspiracy Theories	Molly Brandenburg, Carter Roy	Pop history	Wednesdays
Conspiracy Theories: CIA Edition	Miscellaneous	True crime	Thursday
Conspiracy Theories: Music Edition	Molly Brandenburg, Carter Roy	True crime	Wednesdays
Crime Bites	Miscellaneous	True crime	Miscellaneous
Crime Countdown	Alaina Urquhart, Ash Kelley	True crime	Mondays
Crimes of Passion	Lanie Hobbs	True crime	Wednesdays
Criminal Couples	Miscellaneous	True crime	Mondays
Cults	Greg Polcyn, Vanessa Richardson	Pop history/true crime	Tuesdays
Daily Quote	Kate Leonard	Self-help	Daily
Dare to Lead with Brené Brown	Brené Brown	Society/culture	Mondays
The Dark Side of...	Kate Leonard, Richard Rossner	Pop history	Mondays
Deathbed Confessions	Estefania Hageman	Society/culture	Wednesday
Dictators	Kate Leonard, Richard Rossner	Pop history	Tuesdays
Dog Tales	Alastair Murden	Pop history	Mondays
Espionage	Carter Roy	Pop history	Mondays
Extraterrestrial	Bill Thomas, Tim Johnson	Pop history	Tuesdays
Faerie	N/A	Audiodrama	Mondays
Famous Fates	Vanessa Richardson, Carter Roy	Society/history/culture	Wednesdays
Female Criminals	Vanessa Richardson, Sami Nye	True crime	Wednesdays
Gone	Molly Brandenburg, Richard Rossner	True crime	Alternate Mondays
Great Women of Business	Vanessa Richardson, Molly Brandenburg	Business documentary	N/A (limited series)
Haunted Places	Greg Polcyn	Parapsychology	Thursdays
Haunted Places: Ghost Stories	Alastair Murden	Parapsychology	Thursdays
Historical Figures	Carter Roy, Vanessa Richardson	Pop history	Alternate Wednesdays
Hostage	Irma Blanco, Carter Roy	True crime	Thursdays
Impostors: The Commander	Abby Ellin	True crime	Mondays
Impostors: The Spy	Alex French	Investigative journalism	Mondays
Incredible Feats with Dan Cummins	Dan Cummins	Documentary	Weekdays
International Infamy with Ashley Flowers	Ashley Flowers	True crime	Tuesdays
Internet Urban Legends	Loey Lane, Snitchery	Paranormal	Tuesdays
The Kennedys	Miscellaneous	Society/history/culture	N/A
Kingpins	Kate Leonard, Howell Hargest	True crime	Fridays
Medical Murders	Alastair Murden, Dr. David Kipper	True crime	Wednesdays
Medical Mysteries	Molly Brandenburg, Richard Rossner	Medical documentary	Tuesdays
Mind's Eye	N/A	Audiodrama	N/A (limited series)
Mythical Monsters	Vanessa Richardson	Mythology retelling	Mondays
Mythology	Vanessa Richardson	Mythology retelling	Tuesdays
Natural Disasters	Kate Leonard, Tim Johnson	Science/history/culture	Thursdays
Not Guilty	Vanessa Richardson	True crime	Mondays
Obituaries	Vanessa Richardson, Carter Roy	History	Wednesdays
Obsessed	Benito Skinner, Mary Beth Barone	Comedy	Mondays
Our Love Story	N/A	Stories	Tuesdays
Political Scandals	Kate Leonard, Richard Rossner	Political documentary	Tuesdays
Rituals	Christine Schiefer, Em Schulz	True crime	Mondays
Scotland Yard Confidential	John Hopkins	True crime	Thursdays
Secret Societies	Kate Leonard, Richard Rossner	Pop history	Mondays
Serial Killers	Greg Polcyn, Vanessa Richardson	True crime	Mondays and Thursdays
Solved Murders	Carter Roy, Wenndy Mackenzie	True crime	Wednesday
Sports Criminals	Tim Johnson, Carter Roy	True crime/history/sports	Thurdays
Supernatural with Ashley Flowers	Ashley Flowers	History/true crime	Wednesdays
Superstitions	Alastair Murden	Stories	Wednesday
Survival	Irma Blanco, Tim Johnson	Documentary	Mondays
Tales	Vanessa Richardson	Mythological retelling	Wednesdays
Today in Music History	Tim Johnson	Music/history	Daily
Today in True Crime	Vanessa Richardson	True crime	Daily
Unexplained Mysteries	Molly Brandenburg, Richard Rossner	Investigative journalism	Thursdays
Unlocking Us with Brené Brown	Brené Brown	Relationships	Wednesdays
Unsolved Murders: True Crime Stories	Carter Roy, Wenndy Mackenzie	True crime	Tuesdays
Very Presidential with Ashley Flowers	Ashley Flowers	Documentary	Tuesdays
Villains	Alastair Murden	Literary criticism	Fridays
Whistleblowers	Pat Rodrigurz	True crime	Tuesdays
Your Magic	Michelle Tea	Society/culture	Mondays

== See also ==
- List of podcasting companies
