= List of podcasting companies =

Podcasting companies

This is a list of notable companies, networks, and organizations which are primarily known for the production and distribution of podcasts in both audio and video format. Although the accessibility of the medium means that many media, news, and radio organizations have produced podcasts, the scope of this list is concerned only with organizations and companies which are primarily involved with, or significantly known for, the production and distribution of podcasts.

Entries are organized alphabetically, with country of origin listed. Entries which are subsidiaries of other organizations have their parent organization noted.

== A-G ==
- Al Jazeera Podcasts – Al Jazeera Media Network – Qatar
- All Things Comedy – United States
- American Public Media – United States
- ANIMA Podcasts – Kroma Entertainment – Philippines
- Audacy – Audacy, Inc. – United States
- AudioBoom – England
- Barstool Sports – United States
- BBC Radio – England
- Cadence13 – Audacy, Inc. – United States
- Canadaland – Canada
- Carolla Digital – United States
- Castbox – Hong Kong
- CBC Radio – Canada
- Crooked Media – United States
- The Daily Wire – United States
- Dixo – Mexico
- Earwolf – SiriusXM – United States
- ESPN Radio – The Walt Disney Company – United States
- Exactly Right Podcast Network – United States
- The Fellas Studios – England
- Feral Audio – defunct in 2017 – United States
- Frogpants Network – United States
- Generally Speaking Production Network – United States
- Gimlet Media – Spotify – United States

== H-Q ==
- HeadGum – United States
- Heritage Radio Network – United States
- Idle Thumbs – United States
- iHeartRadio – United States
- The Incomparable – United States
- iVoox – Spain
- Jupiter Broadcasting – United States
- Lemonada Media – United States
- Libsyn – United States
- Life's Little Murder Boards – United Kingdom
- Luminary – United States
- Maximum Fun – United States
- Megaphone – Spotify – United States
- Nerdist Industries – United States
- New York Times Podcast – United States
- Night Vale Presents – United States
- Noiser Podcast Network – England
- NPR – United States
- Parcast – Spotify – United States
- Pineapple Street Studios – United States
- Play.it – Audacy, Inc. – United States
- PodcastOne – United States
- Public Radio Exchange – United States
- QCode – United States

== R-Z ==
- Radiotopia – Public Radio Exchange – United States
- Realm Media – United States
- Relay – United States
- Revision3 – defunct in 2017 – United States
- Discovery Digital Networks – United States
- The Ringer – Spotify – United States
- The Roost – Rooster Teeth & WarnerMedia – United States
- Slate – United States
- SModcast Podcast Network – United States
- Stitcher – United States
- Team Coco – SiriusXM – United States
- TLV1 – Israel
- TWiT.tv – United States
- The Verge – United States
- Vox Media Podcast Network – United States
- Wall Street Journal Radio Network – United States
- WNYC Studios – New York Public Radio – United States
- Wondery – Amazon Music/Amazon – United States
