= Generally Speaking Production Network =

American media production company

- Status: Active
- Founded: December 16, 2005
- Founder: Cliff and Stephanie Ravenscraft
- Country of origin: United States
- Headquarters location: Hebron, Kentucky, US
- Distribution: Worldwide
- Publication types: Podcasts
- Nonfiction topics: Balanced living; Entertainment; Business & technology
- Official website: gspn.tv

The Generally Speaking Production Network (GSPN) is an online media production company founded by Cliff and Stephanie Ravenscraft on December 16, 2005.

== Background ==
=== History ===
A fan of the television series Lost, and inspired by Leo Laporte and his this Week in Tech podcast, Cliff Ravenscraft began with a Lost-discussion podcast after only finding one other on the subject in 2005. Ravenscraft began the podcast as a hobby with no experience in broadcasting, radio, or television; in a June 2007 interview with Podcast User Magazine, Ravenscraft confessed that "he didn't put a lot [of] preparation into the show at first, and that his audio was poor, but [...] the content was in high demand." Ravenscraft gathered thousands of listeners in only a few weeks, and quickly added his wife Stephanie to the podcast.

Soon thereafter, they launched a second Lost podcast, followed by podcasts discussing faith and family issues, and one about Cliff's life (originally titled My Crazy Life). In December 2008, Cliff Ravenscraft had worked in the insurance industry for eleven years when he left his job to begin podcasting full-time. In 2008, he claimed that, since October 2009, GSPN was producing "more money every month that [he'd] ever made in [his] life."

=== Personnel ===
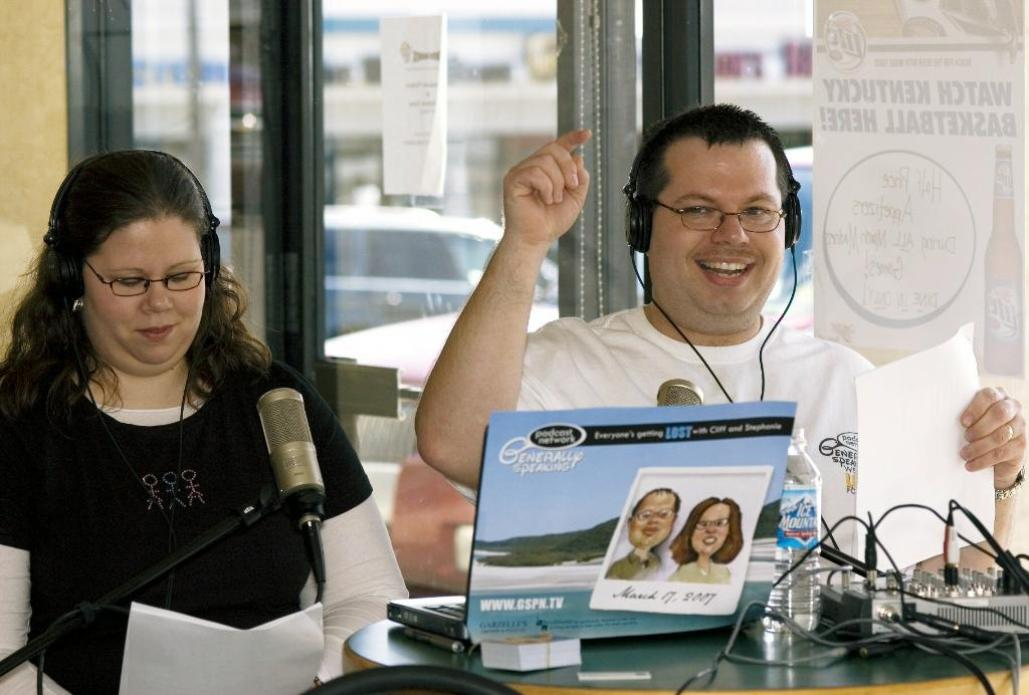
Stephanie and Cliff Ravenscraft

Cliff Ravenscraft (born c. 1972/1973) grew up in Erlanger, Kentucky and graduated Conner High School in 1992. In 2001, Ravenscraft was an associate pastor of a Highland Heights, Kentucky church for which he blogged about his faith in his "Almost Daily Devotional". Building upon a childhood interest in CB radio, and after he began the Weekly LOST Podcast, Ravenscraft switched from blogging to podcasting.

Cliff and his wife Stephanie have three children, Meagan, Matthew, and McKenna. The elder two Ravenscraft children have produced their own GSPN podcasts, The World According To Meagan and Gaming With Matt respectively.

== Products ==
=== Podcasts ===
GSPN only advertises on two of its podcasts, and has strict requirements as to where and how advertisements will be implemented. GSPN previously offered a subscription service for US$10 a month which removed ads for subscribers, and gave them access to additional podcast material and a daily blog. GSPN scrapped the Plus Member program on January 17, 2011, and has since produced all content with no advertising. The PodcastAnswerMan podcast however sells products where the product itself is a video tutorial. Cliff Ravenscraft also offers a 4-week online podcasting course for a fee. As of July 2010, GSPN currently lists 24 separate podcasts, divided by subject matter:

Balanced Living podcasts

- Biggest Loser
- Family From the Heart, Authentic Life Radio, Pursuing A Balanced Life (previously My Crazy life), and Watermark Church

Business & Technology podcasts

- Business Tech Weekly (cancelled)
- Facebook 101
- Help I Got a Mac (cancelled)
- Podcast Answer Man
- Social Media Serenity (cancelled)
- Virtual Assistant Podcast

Entertainment podcasts

- Desperate Housewives
- Doctor Who
- Gaming With Matt
- Grey's Anatomy
- Heroes
- Musically Challenged
- Private Practice
- The World According To Meagan
- TV Talk
- Twilight Saga Podcast
- Hunger Games Fan Podcast
- Weekly LOST Podcast

==== Weekly LOST Podcast ====
Cliff Ravenscraft began GSPN and his podcasting career with his Lost podcast. Stephanie Ravenscraft introduced her husband to the series and, after watching the first-season finale in May 2005, he was hooked. Seven months later, Cliff recorded the first episode of the Weekly LOST Podcast for 30 minutes, the first official GSPN production.

As of July 2010, there are 261 episodes of the Weekly LOST Podcast, and over 50,000 subscribers. On May 23, 2010, GSPN hosted watch party for the series finale of Lost.

==== Cancelled podcasts ====
GSPN produced a podcast dedicated to the TV series Drive, but stopped after the show was canceled in April 2007. On December 29, 2011, several shows were cancelled including Balanced Living Weekly, Full Time Mom, Business Tech Weekly, Social Media Serenity, Help I Got a Mac, Almost Daily Devotional, and About The Church.

=== Related services ===
In addition to producing and publishing their podcasts, the Ravenscrafts offer consulting for others interested in beginning podcasting, as well as setting up a website and all the amenities necessary to begin podcasting. Podcasting AtoZ is a regular course, founded by Cliff Ravenscraft, to provide a start for aspiring podcasters.

== See also ==
- List of podcasting companies
