= Stjepan Razum =

Croatian holocaust denier and Roman Catholic priest

DRUŠTVO ZA ISTRAŽIVANJE TROSTRUKOG LOGORA JASENOVAC
- Abbreviation: DRUŠTVO JASENOVAČKI LOGORI I DJL
- Formation: June 6, 2014; 12 years ago
- VAT ID no.: 28062871821 (OIB)
- Registration no.: 21011555
- Headquarters: Pavlenski put 7d Zagreb, Croatia
- President: Stjepan Razum
- Board of directors: Stjepan Razum, Mate Rupić, Igor Vukić

Stjepan Razum (born 16 December 1960) is a Croatian church historian and Roman Catholic priest. He is the director of the Archdiocesan Archives in Zagreb and a member of the Commission for the Croat martyrology of the Episcopal Conference of Bosnia and Herzegovina and Episcopal Conference of Croatia; mainly researching on the Catholic priests and nuns killed and persecuted by Yugoslav communists.

In addition, Razum strongly believes and advertises that the Earth is flat.

Razum is also the president of Society for Research of the Threefold Jasenovac Camp ("Društvo za istraživanje trostrukog logora Jasenovac"); he and the secretary of that society popular historian Igor Vukić were both publicly denounced as Holocaust deniers.

In 2018, Razum published a Facebook post expressing support for Richard Williamson, a member of a fringe Catholic breakaway movement who was convicted of Holocaust denial in Germany.

In January 2019, Razum and Croatian mathematician Josip Pečarić published a book titled Razotkrivena jasenovačka laž ("The Jasenovac Lie Revealed"), which denies that the Ustaše operated an extermination camp at Jasenovac, arguing instead that it was a forced labor camp.
