= Josip Pečarić =

Croatian mathematician (1948–2026)

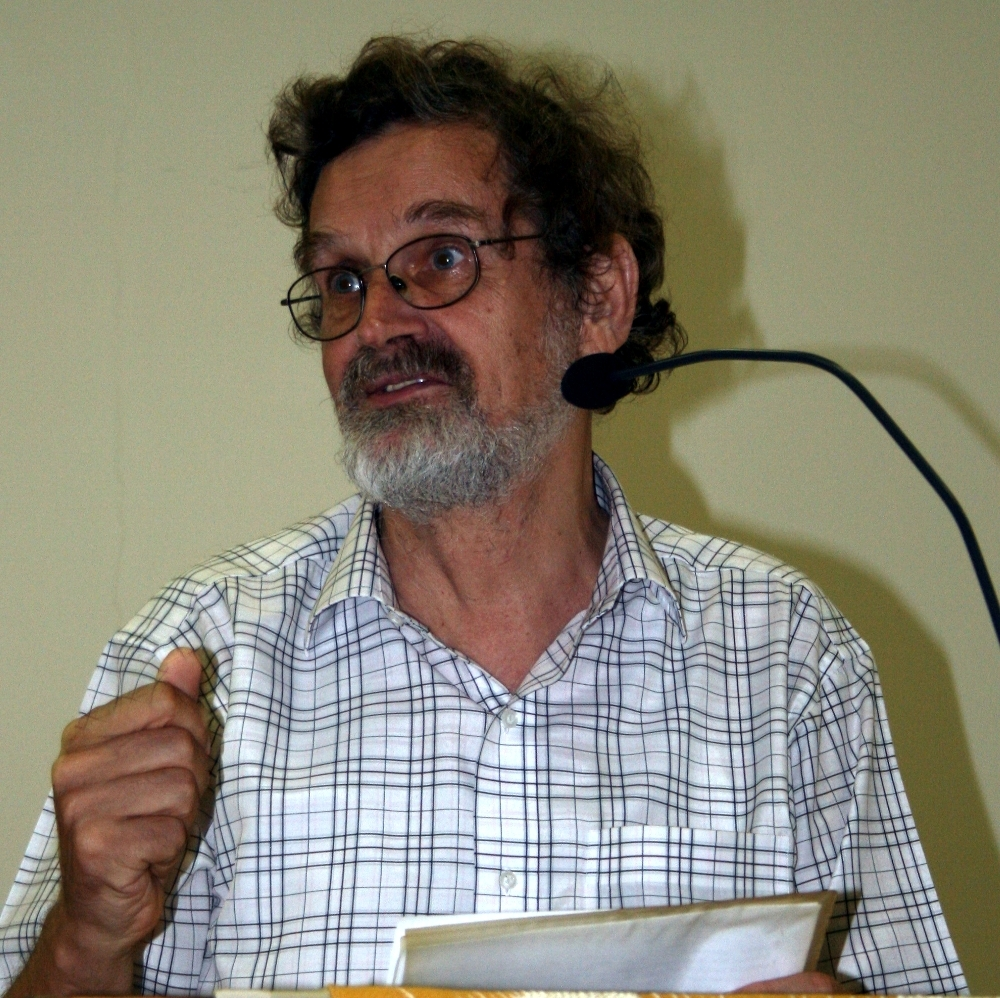
- Pečarić in 2012
- Born: 2 September 1948; Kotor, PR Montenegro, FPR Yugoslavia
- Died: 29 October 2026 (aged 78); Zagreb, Croatia
- Education: University of Belgrade
- Known for: Theory of inequalities
- Scientific career
- Fields: Mathematics
- Workplaces: University of Zagreb
- Thesis: Jensen's and related inequalities (1982)
- Doctoral advisor: P. M. Vasić

Josip Pečarić (2 September 1948 – 29 October 2026) was a Croatian mathematician and writer. He was a professor of mathematics in the Faculty of Textile Technology at the University of Zagreb, Croatia, and was a full member of the Croatian Academy of Sciences and Arts. He wrote and co-authored over 1,200 mathematical publications. He also published a number of works on history and politics that have been described as comprising historical negationism or Holocaust denial.

== Early life and education ==
Pečarić was born in Kotor, Montenegro (at the time part of Yugoslavia) on 2 September 1948, where he remained to attend elementary and high school. He studied at the University of Belgrade's Faculty of Electrical Engineering for his undergraduate and master's degrees, which he completed respectively in 1972 and 1975. The supervisor of his master's degree, mathematics professor, Dobrilo Tošić, inspired him to switch fields to mathematics.

He remained at the University of Belgrade, working on his PhD in mathematics from 1975 to 1982. He received it under the supervision of Petar Vasić. His dissertation was on Jensen's and related inequalities. He began working at the University of Zagreb in 1987.

== Mathematics career ==
Pečarić is known for his work in the theory of inequalities. He founded several journals, all published by Element in Zagreb: he was recently Editor-in-Chief at Mathematical Inequalities and Applications and at the Journal of Mathematical Inequalities, and also founded Operators and Matrices.

He wrote and co-authored over 1,200 articles on mathematics in journals, books, and conference proceedings. He also coauthored over 20 mathematical books, including 6 that are written in English.

== Political views and historical negationism ==
In addition to his mathematical work, Pečarić published more than 20 books and 40 articles on history and politics. This work is from a far-right point of view, and has been criticized as comprising historical negationism or Holocaust denial.

For example, Pečarić advocated for the return of the World War II-era fascist salute Za dom spremni. This salute has been called the Croatian equivalent of the German Sieg Heil. His 2017 book General Praljak reinvents the war criminal Slobodan Praljak as a humanist and war hero. His books Serbian Myths about Jasenovac and The Jasenovac Lie Revealed, the latter coauthored with Stjepan Razum, argued that the Jasenovac concentration camp was a labor camp with much lower casualties than the commonly accepted figure, and that the bulk of its victims were Croats killed by Yugoslav communist authorities after the war. This last prompted the Simon Wiesenthal Centre to advocate the Croatian government to ban publications denying the war crimes of the Ustaša.

== Death ==
Pečarić died on 29 October 2026, at the age of 79.

== Honors and awards ==
Pečarić received a number of honors and awards. He was awarded the Croatian National Science Award in 1996, and received the Order of Danica Hrvatska in 1999. Pečarić was appointed to full membership of the Croatian Academy of Sciences and Arts in 2000. In 2008, a conference was held in honor of his 60th birthday and an issue (volume 2 no. 2) of the Banach Journal of Mathematical Analysis was dedicated to him. Another conference was held in 2014 in Pečarić's honor on the occasion of the publication of his 1000th mathematical paper.

== Selected bibliography ==
=== Textbooks ===
- Recent Advances in Geometric Inequalities, co-authored with Dragoslav Mitrinović and Veno Volenec. Dordecht : Springer Science & Business Media (1989). ISBN 978-94-015-7842-4
- Inequalities Involving Functions and Their Integrals and Derivatives, co-authored with Dragoslav Mitrinović and A.M. Fink. Dordecht : Springer; Kluwer Academic Publishers (1991). ISBN 978-94-011-3562-7
- Convex Functions, Partial Orderings, and Statistical Applications, co-authored with Frank Proschan and Y.L. Tong. Boston : Academic Press (1992). ISBN 9780080925226
- Classical and New Inequalities in Analysis, co-authored with Dragoslav Mitrinović and A.M. Fink. Dordecht : Springer Science & Business Media (1993). ISBN 978-94-017-1043-5
- Mond-Pečarić Method in Operator Inequalities, co-authored with Takayuki Furuta, Jadranka Mićić Hot and Yuki Seo. Zagreb : Element (2005). ISBN 9789531975711
- Multiplicative Inequalities of Carlson Type and Interpolation, co-authored with Leo Larsson, Lech Maligranda and Lars-Erik Persson. World Scientific Publishing Co. (2006). ISBN 978-981-4478-36-6

=== Journal articles ===
- Inequalities for Differentiable Mappings with Application to Special Means and Quadrature Formulæ, with Charles E. M. Pearce in Applied Mathematics Letters (2000). doi:10.1016/S0893-9659(99)00164-0
- Hadamard-type Inequalities for S-convex Functions, with Ugur S Kirmaci, Milica Klaričić Bakula and Mehmet Emin Özdemir in Applied Mathematics and Computation (2007). doi:10.1016/j.amc.2007.03.030
- New Means of Cauchy's Type, with Matloob Anwar in Journal of Inequalities and Applications (2008). doi:10.1155/2008/163202

=== Non-fiction books ===
- Srpski mit o Jasenovcu: Skrivanje istine o beogradskim konc-logorima. Zagreb : Croatian information centre (1998).
- Srpski mit o Jasenovcu II: O Bulajićevoj ideologijigenocida hrvatskih autora. Zagreb : Element (2000).
- Serbian myth about Jasenovac. Zagreb : Stih (2001). ISBN 9789536959006
- Književnik Mile Budak sada i ovdje [Writer Mile Budak here and now]. Zagreb : Vlastita naklada (2005). ISBN 9789539888747
- General Praljak, co-authored with Miroslav Međimorec. Zagreb : Vlastita naklada (2017). ISBN 9789537575212
- Razotkrivena jasenovačka laž [The Jasenovac Lie Revealed], co-authored with Stjepan Razum. Zagreb : Društvo za istraživanje trostrukog logora Jasenovac (2018). ISBN 9789535856511

== Sources ==
- Byford, Jovan (2011). Staro sajmište: mesto sećanja, zaborava i sporenja. Beogradski centar za ljudska prava. ISBN 978-86-7202-131-8.
