= Popular history =

Genre of historiography

Popular history, also called pop history, is a broad genre of historiography that takes a popular approach, aims at a wide readership, and usually emphasizes narrative, personality and vivid detail over scholarly analysis. The term is used in contradistinction to professional academic or scholarly history writing which is usually more specialized and technical and thus less accessible to the general reader.

== Conceptualizations ==
It is proposed that popular history is a "moral science" in the sense that it recreates the past not only for its own sake but also to underscore how history could facilitate an ethically responsible present. Some view it as history produced by authors who are better interlocutors capable of translating the language of scientificity to ordinary everyday language.

Some scholars partly attributed the development of popular history to the increase of writers-turned-historians such as Benson Lossing, David Pae, and Mary Botham Howitt, who wrote historical events "in good style" and, thus, more appealing to the public.

== Popular historians ==
Some popular historians are without academic affiliation while others are academics, or former academics, who have (according to one writer) "become somehow abstracted from the academic arena, becoming cultural commentators." Many worked as journalists, perhaps after taking an initial degree in history. Popular historians may become nationally renowned or best-selling authors and may or may not serve the interests of particular political viewpoints in their roles as historians that write for a wide-ranging readership. Many authors of supposed official histories and authorized biographies would qualify as popular historians serving the interests of particular institutions or public figures.

Popular historians aim to appear on the "general lists" of general publishers, rather than the university presses that have dominated academic publishing in recent years. Increasingly, popular historians have taken to television where they are able, often accompanying a series of documentaries with a tie-in book.

== Examples ==
=== Academics ===
Recent examples of American popular historians with academic affiliations include Daniel J. Boorstin, Stephen E. Ambrose, Doris Kearns Goodwin and Pauline Maier.

Recent examples of British popular historians who are also academics include Niall Ferguson, Mary Beard, Christopher Hibbert, David Starkey, Dan Jones, Simon Sebag Montefiore and Simon Schama, and – from a previous generation – Eric Hobsbawm, Paul Johnson, E. P. Thompson, A. J. P. Taylor (a pioneer of history on television) and Christopher Hill. Podcaster and pop history author Tom Holland, while not holding any formal qualifications in the field, does retain an academic affiliation. Much of Hugh Trevor-Roper's output was also directed at a popular audience. There is also Stella Tillyard and her work Aristocrats, which combined scholarly research with the popular method of presentation.

Canadian academics whose work has crossed over to public consciousness are few. Examples might include Michael Bliss, Donald Creighton, Desmond Morton, J. L. Granatstein, or Margaret MacMillan. In French Canada the influence of Father Lionel Groulx in the historical thought of the twentieth century was preponderant.

=== Non academics ===
American non-academics include Walter Lord, Bruce Catton, Shelby Foote, David McCullough, Max Cutler, Ron Cutler, Bill Bryson and Barbara W. Tuchman. Podcasting has become a new medium for the dissemination of popular history, in which the contributions of Americans Dan Carlin and Robert Evans are notable.

John Julius Norwich, Charles Allen, William Dalrymple and Tariq Ali are popular British historians who have never been academics.

English-Canadian writers of popular histories include journalists Pierre Berton and Peter C. Newman, humourist Will Ferguson, folklorist and pulp fiction writer Thomas P. Kelley, and television presenter Patrick Watson. François-Xavier Garneau was the leading historian in the nineteenth century French Canada from outside the academy. Polemicists in the national unity debate have also written influentially about Canadian history, notably militant Pierre Vallières and journalist Normand Lester critiquing the Canadian state and novelist Mordecai Richler critiquing Quebec nationalist historians as anti-Semitic. Notably, Canada has produced several writers who have written popular histories of specific ethnic communities, including Ken McGoogan (Scots and Irish), Myrna Kostash (Ukrainians), etc.

== See also ==
- Public history
- History magazines
- List of history podcasts
- Narrative history
- Official history
- Popular science
- Whig history
