= Noiser Podcast Network =

History podcast network

- Type: Private
- Industry: Podcast production
- Founded: 2020
- Founder: Pascal Hughes
- Headquarters: London, United Kingdom
- Area served: Worldwide
- Key people: Pascal Hughes (CEO)
- Products: Podcasts
- Website: noiser.com

Noiser Podcast Network is a podcast production company based in the United Kingdom. Founded in 2020 by television producer Pascal Hughes, the company specialises in history podcasts. Noiser has produced a number of shows including Real Dictators, Short History Of…, Titanic: Ship of Dreams, Sherlock Holmes Short Stories and Jane Austen Stories. Noiser is affiliated with WME

== History ==
Noiser Podcast Network was founded in 2020 and released Real Narcos and Real Dictators that same year. Spotify signed a first-look deal with Noiser. The agreement was the first of its kind with a UK podcast producer. Shows created as part of the collaboration included Deathbed Confessions. The network continued to produce its own shows, including Short History Of..., Napoleon and Detectives Don't Sleep. In 2024, the BBC acquired the non-exclusive rights to multiple Noiser originals to feature on BBC Sounds.

== Programming ==
- Real Narcos – about narcoterrorists
- Real Dictators – profiles of authoritarian leaders
- Short History Of… – single-episode explorations of historical events and figures.
  - Eine Kurze Keschichte Uber – German Version
- Real Survival Stories – first-person accounts of survival.
- Titanic: Ship of Dreams
- D-Day: The Tide Turns
- History Daily
- Ancient Civilisations
- Napoleon
- Detectives Don't Sleep
- Sherlock Holmes Short Stories
  - Sherlock Holmes Kurzgeschichten – German Version
- Jane Austen Stories
- Charles Dickens Ghost Stories
- Real Vikings
- The Curious History of Your Home
- Adolf Hitler: Rise and Downfall

=== Real Dictators ===
Real Dictators is narrated by actor Paul McGann.

=== Sherlock Holmes Short Stories ===
Narrated by actor Hugh Bonneville, playing the role of Dr. Watson.

== Books ==
In July 2025, it was announced in trade magazine The Bookseller that A Short History of Ancient Rome would be published by Transworld. The book, written by Pascal Hughes, was published on 23 October 2025. Another in the series will be published in 2026.

== Reception ==
In 2023, Noiser won the Bronze award for Best Network at the British Podcast Awards. Real Dictators won the Best Arts and Culture Podcast award at the British Podcast Awards 2021.

== See also ==
- List of podcasting companies
