= Ivoox =

Spanish radio platform

iVoox is a podcast and radio platform in Spanish. The third most used podcast app in Spain, after YouTube and Spotify. It was founded in 2010 by Juan Ignacio Solera at Grupo Intercom.

== Services ==
iVoox offers mainly Spanish-speaking content and most of its users are based in Spain. The portal offers audio files free of charge, which can be accessed via the website or via an application for mobile devices. There is also the possibility of podcast creation, as long as you have your own account for the publication of content.

iVoox is using ads, and a subscription fee can be activated to subscribe some podcasts.

== Popular programmes ==
The most popular podcasts in Ivoox are in Spanish, and among them:

- El Rey del Cachopo (true crime podcast)
- La ContraHistoria de Fernando Díaz Villanueva (History)
- Año 1 después de Diego by Mundo Deportivo journalists
- Campamento Krypton
- V9 (Formula One)

== Controversies ==
Some media have pointed out that iVoox can be a source of fake news because it lacks a team of moderators. This is in addition to the fact that it favours major news channels such as Cadena Ser, Los 40 principales, Cadena Cope or newspaper OkDiario. Juan Ignacio Solera, founder of the platform denied those allegations.
