= Privredni vjesnik =

Croatian state-owned business and finance newspaper

- Type: Weekly newspaper
- Owner: Croatian Chamber of Commerce
- Publisher: Privredni vjesnik d.o.o.
- Editor-in-chief: Darko Buković
- Founded: 1953
- Language: Croatian
- Headquarters: Kačićeva 9, Zagreb, Croatia
- Circulation: 30,000
- ISSN: 0032-8995
- Website: www.privredni.hr

Privredni vjesnik (English: The Business Messenger) is the oldest weekly business and financial newspaper in Croatia.

It was founded in 1953 by Privredna komora Zagreb (Chamber of Commerce Zagreb). Today it is owned by Hrvatska gospodarska komora (Croatian Chamber of Commerce) and about 30,000 copies are distributed to all companies members of the Chamber.
