= Lars-Erik Persson =

Swedish mathematician (born 1944)

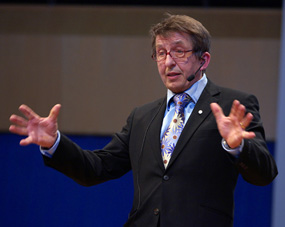
Lars-Erik Persson

Lars-Erik Persson (born 24 September 1944) is a Swedish/Norwegian professor in mathematics. His merits, background and personality have been described in many ways both in newspapers and scientific Journals.

Persson was born in the small village Svanabyn in north Sweden. He had a special “class travel” from a poor farmer family to well established mathematician. He took his PhD in mathematics at Umeå University 1974. After that he worked as Associate Professor at Umeå University and Luleå University of Technology. From 1992 Persson has been employed as a Professor in one or other form at one or more of the following universities: UiT The Arctic University of Norway, Luleå University of Technology, Uppsala University, Karlstad University and Lund University. In 2005 Persson got a title of honorary Professor at Eurasian National University in Kazakhstan.

Persson has been collaborating with many researchers around the world. In particular, he has written joint papers/books with around 170 mathematicians from 42 countries, having around 350 scientific publications, with 10 scientific books among them. He is also a coauthor of 5 teaching books and Editor of 7 books. Persson'smost cited books are "Weighted Inequalities of Hardy Type" and "Convex Functions and Their Applications", with totally more than 3000 citations in Google Scholar.

Persson's research areas are the following nine ones: Fourier Analysis, Interpolation Theory, PDE:s and Homogenization Theory, Convexity Theory, Hardy-Type Inequalities, Continuous and Matricial Inequalities, Functional Analysis, Applied Mathematics and Mathematical Didactics. Persson has made major contributions in all mentioned areas. In particular, Persson has been a supervisor for students with PhD exams in each of these nine areas, totally more than 71 until year 2025.

The other main academic merits of Persson are for example the following:

- Persson was vice President (1994-1996) and then President (1996-1998) of the Swedish Mathematical Society.
- In 2010 and 2012-2014 Persson was the chairman of the board NT1 (Natural and Engineering Sciences) at The Swedish Research Council, a government agency distributing funding for all basic research of the highest quality in Sweden.
- In 2002 Persson got the Louise Petrén’s award for his support to female mathematicians in Sweden, being the first who got such an award. Indeed, he has been a supervisor for 31 females with PhD exams (six of them are already Professors in four countries).
- Persson has received awards as the best of the year at academic celebrations at the university for a) supervision, b) research, c) teacher and d) collaboration with institutions and schools outside the university.
- LEP has received a great number of awards of different types. The most prestigious award Persson received is Ångpanneföreningens stora pris, 2008, for his outstanding work to transfer important knowledge to the world outside the university. This national award is given each year to only one researcher from Sweden in competition between all subjects and universities. This is the only time it has been given to a mathematician.
- It has been arranged conferences/workshops for the 65, 70, 75 and 80 years anneversaries of Persson. In all cases some corresponding proceedings/tematic numbers in Journals to his honor has been published.
