= Max Cutler =

American podcaster and business man

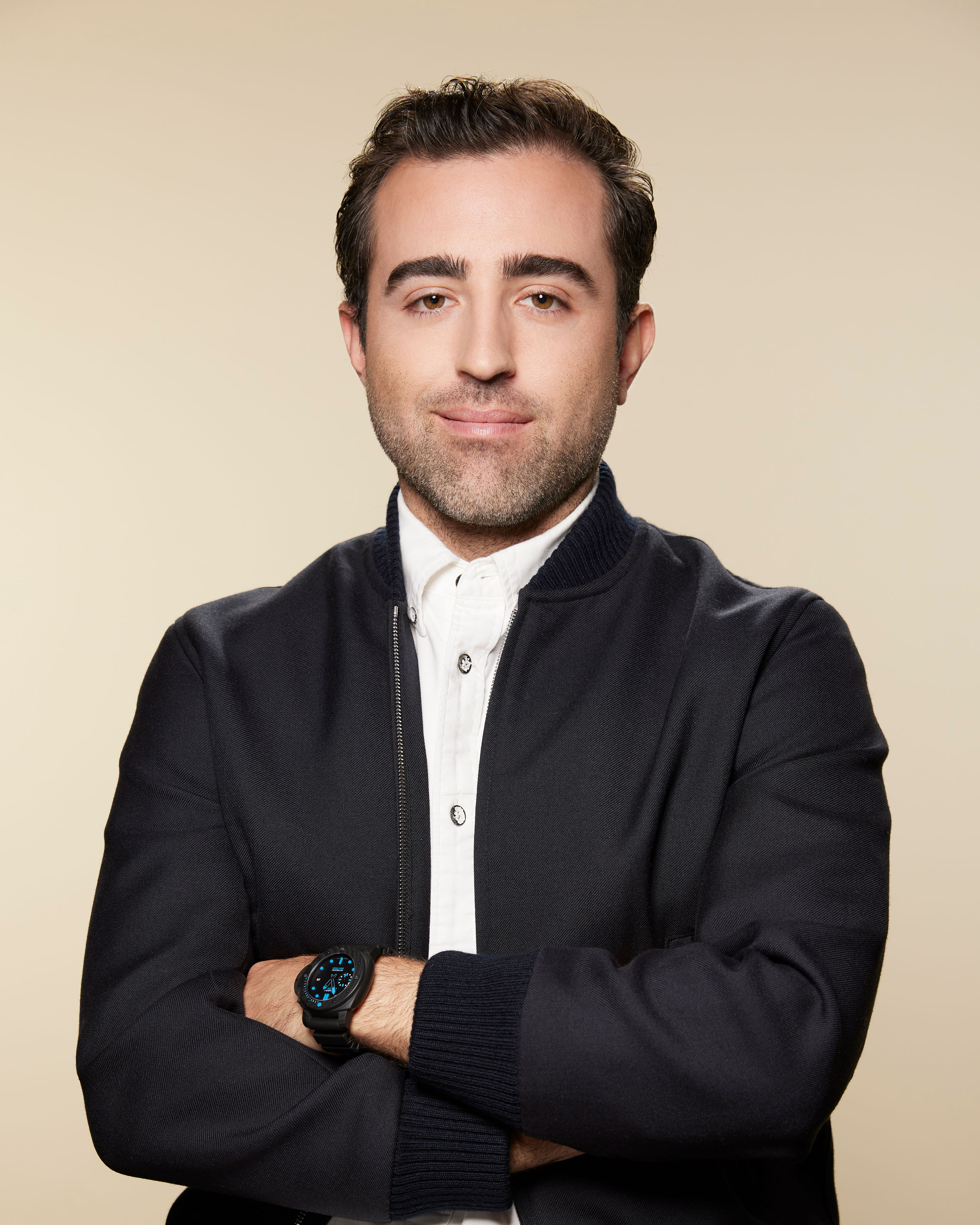
- Max Cutler
- Born: Max Cutler; Los Angeles, California, US
- Occupation: Businessman
- Known for: Founding Pave Studios & Parcast
- Relatives: Ron Cutler (father)

Max Cutler is an American entrepreneur, media executive, businessman and author. He is the founder and Chief Executive Officer of PAVE Studios, an entertainment company he launched in 2024 that develops creator-led intellectual property across video, audio and live experiences. Cutler previously founded the podcast studio Parcast in 2016 and served as Vice President, Head of Talk Creator Content and Partnerships at Spotify.

Spotify acquired Parcast in 2019. The company disclosed initial consideration of approximately $56 million in its quarterly financial filings, with additional contingent consideration of up to $53 million payable over three years, and the Financial Times reported the total deal value at more than $100 million.

At Spotify, Cutler led the division responsible for identifying, recruiting and overseeing exclusive deals with major audio creators, including Joe Rogan (The Joe Rogan Experience), Alex Cooper (Call Her Daddy), Dax Shepard (Armchair Expert), Ashley Flowers (Crime Junkie) and Emma Chamberlain (Anything Goes).

Max Cutler has been featured on Fortune 40 Under 40, The 40(ish) Most Powerful People in Podcasting, Forbes 30 Under 30, and The Hollywood Reporter's 35 Rising Executives Under 35 lists. In 2023, Cutler stepped down from Spotify.

== Early life ==
Cutler was born and raised in Los Angeles, California. He attended Viewpoint School, a nondenominational school in Calabasas, California. He earned a bachelor's degree in finance and entrepreneurship from the University of Arizona in 2013.

Cutler's father, Ron Cutler, is a veteran radio broadcaster who went by the name Ron Diamond. Ron started Cutler Productions, a radio syndication company in the 1980s. Max has cited his father as having a huge influence on his career and life.

== Career ==
=== Parcast ===
In June 2016, Max Cutler and his father founded the podcasting Studio Parcast without outside investment. While he has cited podcast Serial by Sarah Koenig as an inspiration, his vision was to consistently produce high-quality content across various genres. In the latter half of 2021, Parcast ventured into limited-run investigative series, including podcasts Imposters and Revelations (with Blumhouse Productions). At its peak, Parcast achieved over 1 billion downloads, employed a team of over 120 staff and produced more than 140 shows weekly in eight different languages. Cutler is known for creating and producing podcasts like Conspiracy Theories, Supernatural, Horoscope Today and International Infamy.

On April 1, 2019, Spotify acquired Parcast in what was reported at the time as one of the largest acquisitions in podcasting. The Financial Times, citing a source close to the negotiations, reported a deal worth more than $100 million in cash plus future earn-outs.Spotify’s subsequent SEC filings disclosed initial consideration of approximately $56 million, with maximum potential contingent consideration of a further $53 million over three years. The transaction was reported as largest single deal within Spotify’s $400 million to $500 million podcast acquisition program that year.

=== Spotify ===
Following the acquisition, Cutler became Vice President, Head of Talk Creator Content and Partnerships at Spotify, based in Los Angeles and reporting to Chief Content and Advertising Business Officer Dawn Ostroff. He led the division responsible for identifying, recruiting and overseeing exclusive deals and partnerships with major audio creators on the platform.

Creators signed or overseen during Cutler’s tenure included Joe Rogan (The Joe Rogan Experience), Dax Shepard (Armchair Expert), Ashley Flowers (Crime Junkie), Ash and Alaina (Morbid), Alex Cooper (Call Her Daddy), Emma Chamberlain (Anything Goes), Mark Fischbach (Markiplier) and the Fantasy Footballers. Cutler also greenlit a number of nontraditional podcasters such as Kim Kardashian, Brené Brown, and Addison Rae.

Cutler also led efforts to expand Spotify’s creator tools for audience growth and interaction and to grow the platform’s video podcasting business. In addition, Cutler was tasked with leading Kids Content and Audiobook Originals as well as developing content for Spotify’s push into live audio and oversaw Spotify’s push into live audio with the launch of Live on Spotify, which featured programming from The Ringer, Deuxmoi, and live music shows including Lorem Life and New Joints Live.

Cutler left Spotify in 2023 to launch a new venture.

=== Pave Studios ===
In April 2024, Cutler launched PAVE Studios, a Los Angeles based entertainment company. The name is an acronym for Podcasts, Audiobooks, Video and Entertainment. The company develops and owns creator-led intellectual property across audio, video, books and live experiences, and is structured as a portfolio of genre-specific consumer brands rather than a single podcast network.

PAVE launched with two brands: Crime House, focused on true crime, and OpenMind, focused on personality-driven and curiosity-led programming. In April 2026, the company launched a third brand, Rewind, focused on history. OpenMind produces Khloé in Wonder Land, a video and audio series hosted by Khloé Kardashian. Crime House programming includes Clues with Kaelyn Moore, Murder: True Crime Stories, and the twice-daily series Crime House Daily, which Triton Digital ranked as the third biggest new U.S. podcast launch of 2025.

Creators signed to PAVE brands include Connor Tomlinson of Netflix’s Love on the Spectrum, Niecy Nash-Betts and her daughter Dia Nash, Dr. Harini Bhat, Sarah Turney, and many more.

In June 2026, PAVE Studios announced a partnership with A+E Global Media to adapt six of the network’s unscripted franchises, including The First 48, History’s Greatest Mysteries and Modern Marvels, into podcasts under the Crime House and Rewind brands.

PAVE grew from fewer than 10 employees at launch to roughly 70 by late 2025. The company has been cited in coverage of the creator economy as an example of growth in digital-first production at a time of contraction in traditional Hollywood employment.

== Author ==
Cutler is the author of Cults: Inside the World’s Most Notorious Groups and Understanding the People Who Joined Them, based on the podcast Cults.
