= Ignacio Olagüe =

Ignacio Olagüe Videla (12 February 1903 – 10 March 1974) was a Spanish paleontologist and historian of Basque origin.

== Biography ==
Olagüe was born in San Sebastián and studied law at the Universities of Valladolid and Madrid. From 1924 to 1936, he worked in the paleontology laboratory of the National Museum of Natural Sciences in Madrid under the direction of José Royo. Olagüe was inspired by fascist ideologue Ramiro Ledesma Ramos and became a member of his group, the far-right syndicalist JONS movement. Together with Ernesto Giménez Caballero, he founded the first Spanish film society in Madrid in 1929. During the 1950s, he traveled and published in France. Olagüe was vice president of the International Society for the Comparative Study of Civilizations. He died in 1974 at Xàtiva in the province of Valencia.

== The Islamic Revolution in the West ==
In The Islamic Revolution in the West, originally published in 1969 as Les arabes n'ont jamais envahi l'Espagne (Arabs Never Invaded Spain) and subsequently published in Spain in 1974, Olagüe defended various aspects of the theories of Américo Castro. Olagüe argued that it was impossible for Arabs to have invaded Hispania in 711 since they had not yet established their dominance over the neighboring part of North Africa. Instead, Olagüe held that the events of 711 could be explained as skirmishes involving allied North African troops within the context of a civil war pitting Catholic Goths led by Roderic against Goths adhering to some form of Arianism and a largely-nontrinitarian Spanish population, including Nestorians, Gnostics and Manichaeans.

Olagüe's book became a cult work among certain elements of the Spanish Muslim community (most notably circles of converts), as well as Andalusian nationalist factions.

=== Criticism ===
The shortcomings of the work have been early underscored by specialists such as Pedro Martínez Montávez, Pierre Guichard and Dolors Bramon. The latter two agreed that the main drive behind the work is limiting any kind of "foreign" intervention in the history of Spain to the maximum extent possible, thereby inventing, in this case, the construct of a "primordial autochthonous Islam" indebted to the outside one.

A number of critics with specialties in the field have pointed out issues that invalidate Olagüe's thesis in The Islamic Revolution in the West. (Note: Introduction by Bernard Vincent to the edition of The Islamic Revolution in the West published in 2004 by Editorial Plurabelle) As early as 1974, Pierre Guichard observed the paradox of denying the Arab conquest and affirming "orientalization." In 2008, the Arabist Maribel Fierro of the Spanish National Research Council argued that Olagüe's ideology, which is linked to the origins of fascism in Spain, remains influential in contemporary historiographical debate. Meanwhile, historian Eduardo Manzano Moreno observed that "the most surprising thing about Olagüe's thesis is not how crazy it is. Strange and absurd historical theories produced by amateurs, publicists, or even academic historians are counted by the dozens or hundreds. Normally, they tend to be forgotten with the same speed with which they cause a certain initial stir. On the other hand, the idea that Muslims did not really invade Hispania, although it did not cause an excessive echo in its time, seems to be receiving renewed attention in recent times. This is partly the result of its diffusion and discussion in certain Internet forums, where the preference that some of its cultivators have for everything to do with conspiracy theories and whatever puts received knowledge into question is well known".

In 2014, Alejandro García Sanjuán published an extensive critique of Olagüe's thesis regarding the Muslim conquest and analyzed the manipulation of the Muslim period on the Iberian peninsula through a "negationist current, which aims to dissociate the origin of al-Andalus from the conquest and represents," according to the author, a "historiographical fraud carried out by the manipulation, in some cases, and the slanting, in others, of the historical record".
