= Ron Cutler (radio broadcaster) =

American radio broadcaster

Ron Cutler is a radio personality and entrepreneur best known for being the co-founder of the podcasting platform Parcast as well as the founder of Cutler Productions and the Cutler Comedy Networks (now a part of iHeartMedia).

== Biography ==
Cutler was raised in Philadelphia, Pennsylvania. He began his early career hosting teenage dances in Pennsylvania starting in 1961. He eventually transitioned into radio broadcasting as "DJ Ron Diamond", becoming one of the first disc jockeys to play both contemporary music and oldies on FM radio. After moving to San Jose, California, Cutler and a partner, Mel Gollub, took over KUFX in 1970, renaming it to KOME in 1971.

A veteran radio producer, Cutler worked extensively with a number of entertainment figures including Rick Dees, Tom Joyner, and Cousin Brucie throughout the 1980s and 1990s. In the early 1990s, he eventually opened his own radio station, KTUN-AM, which focused on playing movie and show tunes. Cutler founded and ran Cutler Comedy Networks, a radio prep service. It was acquired by Premiere Radio Networks, itself a subsidiary of iHeartMedia. With his son Max Cutler, Cutler started Parcast, a podcasting network and distribution platform, in 2016. The network has launched over 18 podcasts.
