= Sociological Francoism =

Continuing social characteristics of Francoism in Spain

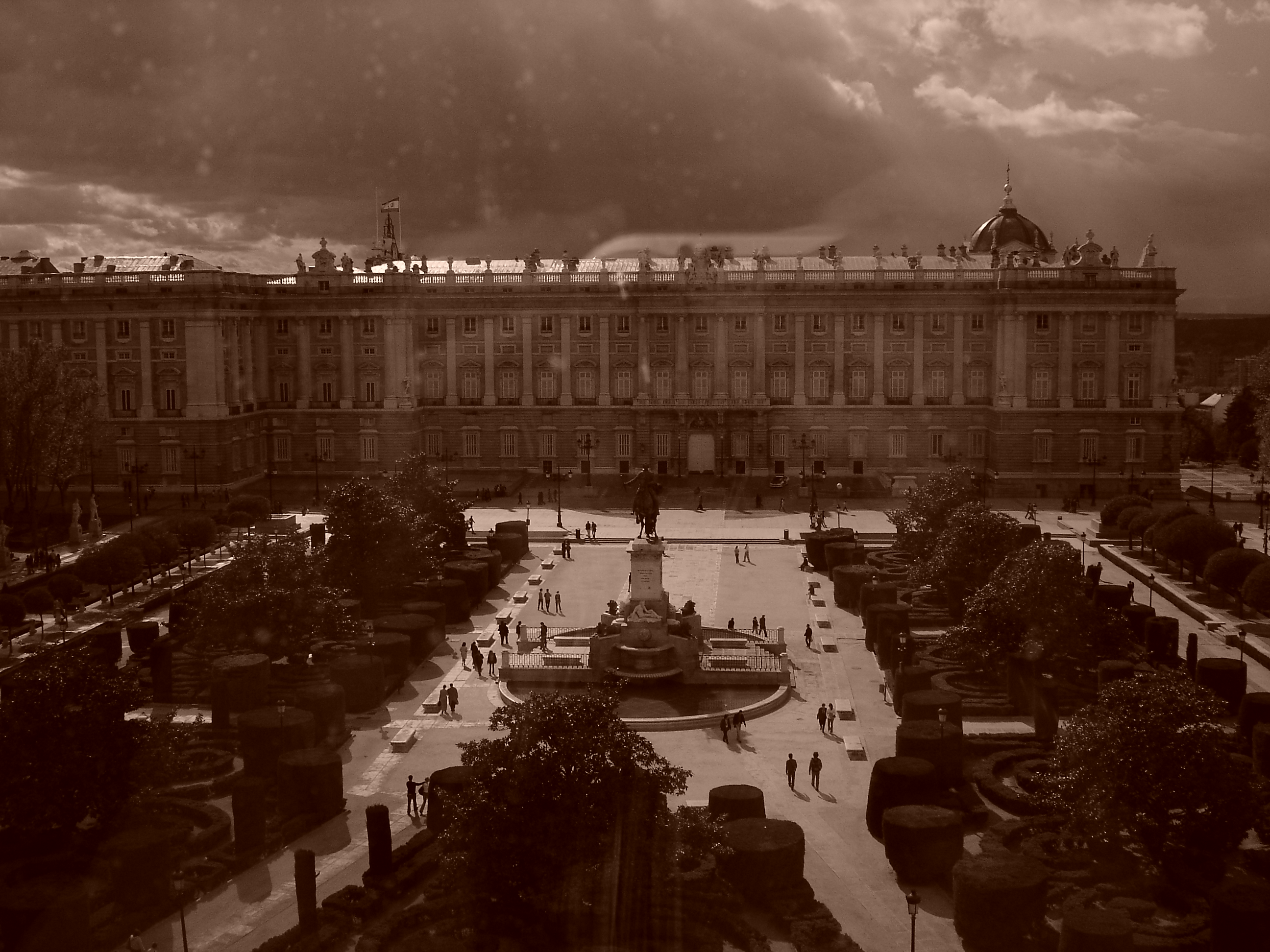
Plaza de Oriente, with the Royal Palace of Madrid behind. This was the setting for the largest pro-Francoist demonstrations both during the dictator's life and after his death. Francoists who remain nostalgic of the regime still commemorate his death here every 20 November (known in Spanish as 20-N).

Sociological Francoism (Spanish: franquismo sociológico) is an expression used in Spain which attests to the social features of Francoism that lingered in Spanish society after the death of Francisco Franco in 1975 and continue to the present day.

The root causes of sociological Francoism are found in the prolonged state of repression that existed during the forty years of the Franco dictatorship (1936–1975), and the fear of a repetition of the Spanish Civil War and a clashing of the so-called two Spains. A further reason for its durability is the positive role attributed to Francoism in the Spanish economic boom (the Spanish miracle, 1959–1975), while avoiding reference to the mass Spanish emigration or the period of economic recession that prevailed during the ten years following the Transition (1975–1979) under King Juan Carlos I. All of this led the Spanish social majority, including even those identified with the anti-Francoist opposition, to perpetuate the conservative and survivalist behaviours that were learned and transmitted from generation to generation since the 1940s. These include self-censorship and the voluntary submission and conformity to authority – which in extreme cases could even be classified as servility (most commonly identified with the "silent majority") – which provided the regime with its cheapest, most effective and most ubiquitous form of repression.

In an interview with Xavier Moret, the writer Manuel Vázquez Montalbán described the phenomenon in the following way:

There was a sociological Francoism which existed before and still exists to a greater or lesser extent today, coupled with Francoist rhetoric in which only the best years – those of 1962 or 1963 and the first part of the 1970s – are remembered, omitting the years of misery and the economic recession that existed prior to the Spanish Civil War and continued to grow under Francoism. The economically prosperous years have been mythologized within sociological Francoism; however, we should remind ourselves that this success was based on exporting the unemployed first to Catalonia and the Basque Country and then later to Europe.

In a similar vein, the philosopher José Luis López Aranguren has written that "Francoism, while originally a political system, transformed into a way of life for the Spanish people".

== Sociological Francoism and political culture ==
In the exercise of political power, sociological Francoism is defined as "the political culture of identification with the [Francoist] regime".

However, the journalist Antonio Maestre adds a definition that goes beyond the political sphere, describing sociological Francoism as:

The collection of citizens and politicians that, having lived well under Francoism and supported its ideas, were in favour of opening up the regime to a certain degree to ensure that the Transition would proceed in a tolerable direction.

The popularity of Franco during his dictatorship was not measured in opinion polls, but in the legitimacy of the army and the charismatic legitimacy of his person (caudillismo), as well as the widespread social binding that took place through the Movimiento nacional (all of which are typical elements of fascism). Together, these ensured massive public demonstrations of support and the practically unanimous results in sporadically held national referendums (such as the Spanish organic law referendum of 1966). In 1969, in one of his last televised Christmas addresses, Franco spoke of Spain's future, saying that all was atado y bien atado (literally "tied and well tied", referring to the institutionalization of his regime), which became a popular saying in Spain. Any clues to his personal health were carefully scrutinized, as were his cryptically expressed intentions, such as the phrase no hay mal que por bien no venga (roughly equivalent to "every cloud has a silver lining"), which he used in reference to the assassination of Luis Carrero Blanco in 1973 by the Basque separatist group ETA, and whose meaning was the subject of endless speculation. In a secret 1971 interview with Vernon Walters, envoy of Richard Nixon, Franco expressed his opinion that upon his death, Spanish society would carry out a political evolution that would not break with his legacy, as the now larger and more well-off Spanish middle class would avoid risking another civil war.

In the regime change that followed Franco's death in 1975, however, those that remained most loyal to Francoism were relegated to far-right movements that failed to gain a single seat in 1977 (and only elected a single MP, Blas Piñar, in the second general elections in 1979 under the coalitionist Unión nacional banner). The political right, represented by a coalition of former Francoist administrators under the banner of the Alianza Popular (referred to as aperturistas, those in favour of social reform), attempted to strike a balance between the need to connect with the social majority while at the same time minimizing associations with the past, though with very little electoral success. During the 1970s and 1980s, the social majority tended to vote for parties from the centre (such as the UCD, led by Adolfo Suárez) or the left (PSOE).

In a book about the Transition, Alfonso Osorio, a member of the 1977 Adolfo Suárez government, describes the reasons behind Alianza Popular's failure to capitalize on sociological Francoism:

What the Alianza Popular intended for, in essence, was to use sociological francoism to their advantage. But as it worked out, what they actually capitalized on was the lingering, and less significant, political Francoism...In the meantime, this sociological Francoism...favoured other democratic options closer to the centre.

Yet the political system continued to show elements inherited from Francoism. The debate between a post-Franco reforma o ruptura (political reform or rupture) ended in a compromise reform established by constitutional consensus, as left-wing parties were conscious that their own weakness prevented a full rupture with the old regime. From 1976 onwards, King Juan Carlos I (designated by Franco as his successor in 1969) and his team of close advisors (essentially Torcuato Fernández-Miranda and Adolfo Suárez) implemented the agreed-upon reform, which left both the inmovilistas (ultraconservatives) and the best-known aperturistas (progressives such as Manuel Fraga and José María de Areilza) sidelined from the process. The degree of democracy thus achieved is questioned by some writers, including Armando López Salinas, who considers it essentially controlled reform, in some sense similar to Giuseppe Tomasi di Lampedusa's characterization of the Italian unification in his novel The Leopard: "The ruling classes need to change something so that everything remains the same".

== Con Franco vivíamos mejor ==
A sign of the survival of Francoist sentiment in a large segment of the population was, among other things, the widespread success of far-right sympathiser Fernando Vizcaíno Casas' satirical novels (Al tercer año resucitó, De camisa vieja a chaqueta nueva), which express viewpoints associated with the then-popular saying "Con Franco vivíamos mejor" (literally, "We lived better with Franco"). Even in 2007, in the context of the debates surrounding the Historical Memory Law, there was still resistance among large segments of society and the political establishment to condemn Francoism, as demonstrated by Spanish right-wing politician Jaime Mayor Oreja:

Why should I have to condemn Francoism when there were many families that lived it with naturalness and normality? In my Basque lands there were endless myths. The [Spanish Civil] war was much worse than Francoism. Some say that the persecutions in Basque towns were terrible, but it can't have been the case if all the Civil Guards from Galicia were asking to be sent to the Basque Country. It was a situation of extraordinary tranquility. Let's leave the commentaries on Francoism to the historians.

The traditional values also remained identified with Francoism: country, religion, and family. As such, "Francoism" is used, in some respects, as synonymous with conservatism, patriarchy, traditionalist conservatism, or authoritarianism; all long-standing phenomena that predate Franco. Indeed, some even reverse the cause and effect between Franco and sociologicial Francoism, positing Franco as the effect of a pre-existing sociological Francoism, as described by former El País editor-in-chief Juan Luis Cebrián:

I don't believe that Franco was the cause, but rather the consequence. I don't think that Franco or Francoism were a sort of military group that seized power, but rather the physical manifestation, or result, of a way of understanding Spain. And a large part of that way of understanding Spain has been transmitted from generation to generation among the sectors of the Spanish right-wing which former president Aznar belongs to, and in which I was educated. I went to the same school as Aznar; my family is, sociologically, like Aznar's; I studied where he studied, which is to say, the Salamanca neighbourhood of Madrid. That is the sociological Francoism to which I belonged, and thus know so well.

The Spanish journalist Enrique Gil Calvo adds desarrollismo – the quick and unscrupulous economic growth that brought about the so-called Spanish Miracle – as another area that has remained identified with Francoism, describing Madrid as having changed from the "red breakwater of all the Spains" to an "ostentatious showcase of upstart sociological neo-Francoism".

The writer Manuel Vázquez Montalbán has been attributed with penning the satirical derivative phrase "contra Franco vivíamos mejor" (literally "We lived better against Franco").

== Esto con Franco no pasaba ==
Another saying that remains present in Spanish society is "Esto con Franco no pasaba" ("This never used to happen with Franco"). It was initially used as a way of denouncing behaviours, arising soon after the death of Franco, that contradicted the norms of the ultra-Catholic morality (see: the destape (literally "uncovering") period of Spanish cinema that followed the abolition of censorship, or the Movida Madrileña).

Currently it is usually used in a rhetorical way to point out the irony that, despite living in a liberal democracy, some freedoms that were permitted by the Francoist regime, such as smoking in public places or barbecuing in the mountains or the beach, have been taken away. Similarly, it is used to criticize current problems in society that did not exist in the Franco era, like the Spanish property bubble, and the consequent delay in young adults leaving the family home.

== Moncloa syndrome ==
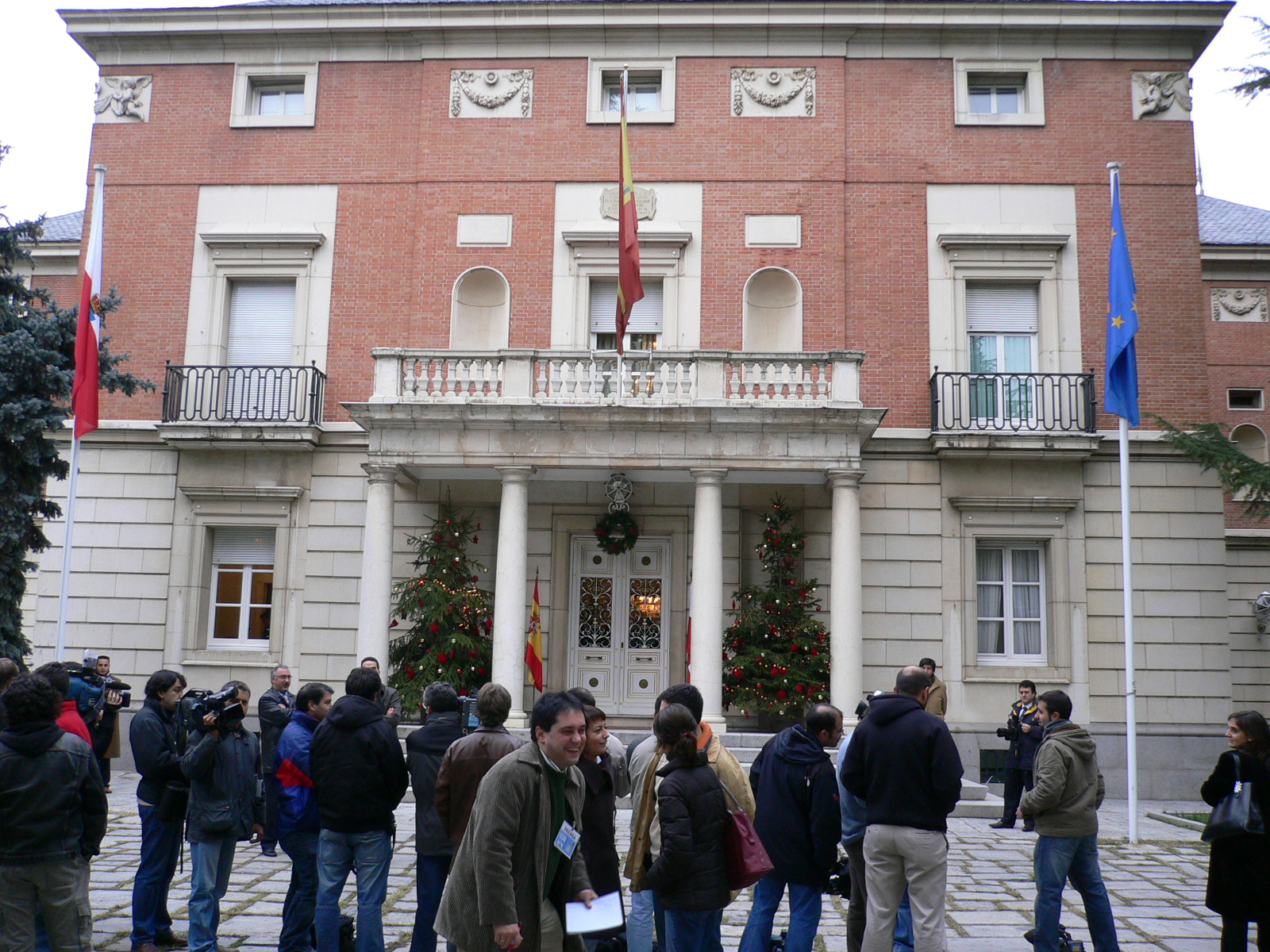
The Palace of Moncloa has been the official residence of the Prime Minister since Adolfo Suárez moved it from the former, traditional, location at 3 Paseo de la Castellana next to the Plaza de Colón in Madrid. The isolation attributed to the new location, in a palace whose setting in the northwestern part of the capital brings to mind Franco's residence in the Royal Palace of El Pardo, is reflected in the expression "Moncloa syndrome", which is used to describe the haughtiness or detachment from reality that has supposedly affected all successive Prime Ministers.

Debates have continued as to whether, in a democratic sense, the lasting effects of Francoism were greater or lesser than the actual changes. One aspect described as an inheritance from the Francoist past is the notable personalism of Spain's leadership (e.g. Adolfo Suarez, Felipe González, José María Aznar, José Luis Rodríguez Zapatero, Mariano Rajoy and Pedro Sánchez) coupled with the extraordinary sway that the government holds over the parliament, much greater than in other European democracies. Although the 1978 Constitution cannot be described as a presidential system, the powers held by the Prime Minister are ample. On the other hand, the investiture of the Prime Minister has always occurred without too many issues until the inconclusive 2015 general election, especially compared to other parliamentary democracies (such as Italy); government mandates have been stable (except for the failed coup d'état of 1981, or perhaps precisely because of it) and lengthy (except the government of Leopoldo Calvo-Sotelo, due to that same circumstance), and had never resorted to coalition government, until the second Sánchez Government in 2020. A final aspect is the fact that the Spanish government has traditionally been a two-party system with smaller, peripheral nationalist/regionalist parties, although the later rise of Podemos, Ciudadanos and Vox has produced a more fragmented parliament.

== Criticism of the concept ==
In an essay, the Spanish academic Carlos Ollero expressed the following reservations about the concept of sociological Francoism:

I think that this expression is imprecise and can lend itself to misunderstandings. It is necessary to distinguish between two interrelated, yet different, meanings, with varying degrees of effectiveness. The first, stricter, meaning refers to the complex of socioeconomic structures and concrete interests that are created, maintained and strengthened by the Francoist system. The second, too broad, includes under the umbrella term of "sociological Francoism" what, in general terms, can be understood as the ensemble of sociopolitical attitudes, consistencies in personal and collective behaviour, and passive or indecisive inertia prompted by forty years of steadfast exercise of personal power.

== See also ==
- Collective memory
- Communist nostalgia
- Culture of Remembrance
- Good old days
- Memorialization
- Motivated forgetting
- Nostalgia for apartheid
- Pact of Forgetting
- Politics of memory
- Postcolonial amnesia
- Rosy retrospection
- Selective omission
- Southern nostalgia
- Truth-seeking
