= Social amnesia =

Collective forgetting by a group of people

Social amnesia, or collective amnesia, is the act of collectively forgetting things or failing to perform due to shared forgetfulness. The concept is often cited in relation to Russell Jacoby's scholarship from the 1970s. Social amnesia can be a result of "forcible repression" of memories, ignorance, changing circumstances, or the forgetting that comes from changing interests. Protest, folklore, "local memory", and collective nostalgia are counter forces that combat social amnesia.

Social amnesia is a subject of discussion in psychology and among some political activists. In the U.S., social amnesia has been said to reflect "the tendency of American penology to ignore history and precedent when responding to the present or informing the future... discarded ideas are repackaged; meanwhile, the expectations for these practices remain the same."

Fits of social amnesia after difficult or trying periods can sometimes cover up the past, and fading memories can actually make mythologies transcend by keeping them "impervious to challenge".

Historian Guy Beiner opted to use the term social forgetting and has shown that under scrutiny this is rarely a condition of total collective oblivion but rather a more complex dynamic of tensions between public forgetting and the persistence of private recollections, which can at times resurface and receive recognition and at other times are suppressed and hidden.

== In biology ==
Another meaning of social amnesia has been studied in biology among mice whose sense of smell is the primary means of social interaction. It is affected by oxytocin, and mice without the gene to produce that brain protein are said to suffer from "social amnesia" and an inability to recognize "familiar" mice." The role of oxytocin in the amygdala in facilitating social recognition and bonding as well as how oxytocin receptor antagonists might induce social amnesia has also been investigated.

== See also ==
- Damnatio memoriae
- De-commemoration
- Good old days
- Motivated forgetting
- Nostalgia for apartheid
- Pact of Forgetting
- Politics of memory
- Postcolonial amnesia
- Rosy retrospection
- Selective omission
- Spiral of silence
- Unethical amnesia
