= Nostalgia for apartheid =

Nostalgia for life in South Africa 1948–94

Nostalgia for apartheid is feelings of nostalgia for the apartheid system in South Africa, as well as more general nostalgia for life in South Africa from 1948 to 1994.

== Background ==
Such feeling is widespread in South Africa, and diverse, ranging from a desire for a return to racial segregation, to a feeling that the apartheid regime, whilst brutal and oppressive, ran the country more efficiently. Whilst found amongst white South Africans where it is associated with white supremacism and Afrikaner nationalism, it also exists amongst black South Africans, where it is associated with disappointment at the continued inequality, and unfulfilled expectations of improved standards of living.

== Similarities ==
It is similar to Soviet nostalgia, where nostalgia also arose for a repressive regime following the fall of that regime, including by those oppressed by it.

== See also ==
- Good old days – Era considered better than the present
- Lost Cause of the Confederacy – Negationist myth of the American Civil War
  - Confederate flag movement – Neo-Confederate group
- Myth of the clean Wehrmacht – Aspect of World War II historiography
- Ostalgie – Nostalgia for aspects of life in East Germany
- Selective omission – Memory bias (deliberate forgetting)
  - Colonial amnesia (the phenomenon of forgetting colonial history or remembering it in certain ways that erase the history of the colonized people).
  - Truth-seeking – Restorative justice process (processes to allow societies to examine and come to grips with past crimes and atrocities and prevent their future repetition.)
    - Truth and Reconciliation Commission (South Africa) – Restorative justice tribunal in post-apartheid South Africa
- Sociological Francoism – Continuing social characteristics of Francoism in Spain
- White savior – Sarcastic or critical description
- Yugonostalgia – Nostalgia for Yugoslavia among ex-Yugoslav populations
