= Memory hole (disambiguation) =

The memory hole is a concept in George Orwell's Nineteen Eighty-Four.

Memory hole may also refer to:

- Memory Hole 1, a radio program
- Memory Hole (Quibi show), a show on Quibi hosted by Will Arnett
- Memory Hole, a YouTube video series by Everything Is Terrible!

== Computing ==
- The PCI hole, a limitation that causes a computer to appear to have less memory available than is physically installed
- The Memory Hole (website) founded in 2002
