= Memory hole =

Fictional device in Nineteen Eighty-Four

"…in the side wall, within easy reach of Winston's arm, a large oblong slit protected by a wire grating."

A memory hole is a fictional device for destroying historical evidence in George Orwell's 1949 dystopian novel Nineteen Eighty-Four. In the novel, the Party's Ministry of Truth systematically erases inconvenient historical documents, in effect, re-writing history to match the ever-changing state propaganda.

== Origins ==
In Nineteen Eighty-Four, the "memory hole" is a small chute leading to a large incinerator used for censorship:

In the walls of the cubicle there were three orifices. To the right of the speakwrite, a small pneumatic tube for written messages, to the left, a larger one for newspapers; and in the side wall, within easy reach of Winston's arm, a large oblong slit protected by a wire grating. This last was for the disposal of waste paper. Similar slits existed in thousands or tens of thousands throughout the building, not only in every room but at short intervals in every corridor. For some reason they were nicknamed memory holes. When one knew that any document was due for destruction, or even when one saw a scrap of waste paper lying about, it was an automatic action to lift the flap of the nearest memory hole and drop it in, whereupon it would be whirled away on a current of warm air to the enormous furnaces which were hidden somewhere in the recesses of the building.

The fictional totalitarian regime of Oceania maintains complete dominance over its population through the control of history and memory, specifically by erasing the past and forging historical facts. This historical forgery enforces a collective reality onto the masses, ensuring that the Party and its ideology persists. This concept is expressed in the principle doctrine of Ingsoc: "Who controls the past, controls the future: who controls the present controls the past".

Nineteen Eighty-Four's protagonist Winston Smith, who works in the Ministry of Truth, is routinely assigned the task of revising old newspaper articles in order to serve the propaganda interests of the government. In one instance, the weekly chocolate ration was decreased from 30 grams to 20. The next day the newspaper announced that the chocolate ration had not been reduced to 20 grams per week, but increased to 20 grams. Any previous mention of the ration having been 30 grams per week needed to be destroyed.

The memory hole is referenced while O'Brien tortures Smith; O'Brien produces evidence of a coverup by the Party, exciting Smith that such documentation exists. However, O'Brien then destroys the evidence in the memory hole and denies not only the existence of the evidence but also any memory of his actions. Smith realises that this is doublethink in action, as O'Brien has actively suppressed his memory of both a politically inconvenient fact and his action taken to destroy the evidence of it.

== Modern usage ==
Following the publication of Nineteen Eighty-Four in 1949, the term "memory hole" entered into common use both as a noun, meaning a place where inconvenient fact is disposed, and a verb meaning "to cause to be forgotten". It was used in a 1952 Foreign Affairs article stating that opposing views under Stalinism must be "consigned to the Orwellian 'memory hole'". After the death of Joseph Stalin, a Reuters report in August 1953 stated "the Soviet Communists are dropping 'big brother' down the ‘memory hole". The term "memory-holed" has also become widely used to describe information that disappears from the Internet.

Don Pittis, a CBS News columnist used the term to express worries that the 2014 "right to be forgotten" decision of the European Court of Justice creates a precedent for governments to create legal mechanisms that would essentially function as "memory holes" in ephemeral electronic storage systems. The Daily Telegraph cited Wikipedia co-founder Jimmy Wales describing the EU's Right to be Forgotten as "deeply immoral", warning that the ruling would result in an Internet "riddled with memory holes".

In July 2002, a website named The Memory Hole, which was dedicated to preserving official documents, was launched by American writer Russ Kick.

== See also ==
- /dev/null – Device file that discards all data written to it
- Ash heap of history – English phrase
- Bit bucket – Lost data in computing
- Blue wall of silence – Informal rule that American police do not report misconduct by other officers
- Book censorship in the United States – Censorship of books in the United States
- Burn bag – Bag used to contain classified items for burning
- Censorship of images in the Soviet Union
- Cover up – Attempt to conceal evidence
- Damnatio memoriae – Exclusion of a person from official records and accounts
- De-commemoration
- Historical revisionism – Reinterpretation of a historical account
- Motivated forgetting
- Pact of forgetting – Political decision in Spain to intentionally ignore the political legacy of Franco
- Postcolonial amnesia
- Retcon – Literary device in fictional storytelling
- Selective omission
- Spiral of silence – Political science and mass communication theory
- Truth-seeking
