= White savior =

Sarcastic or critical description

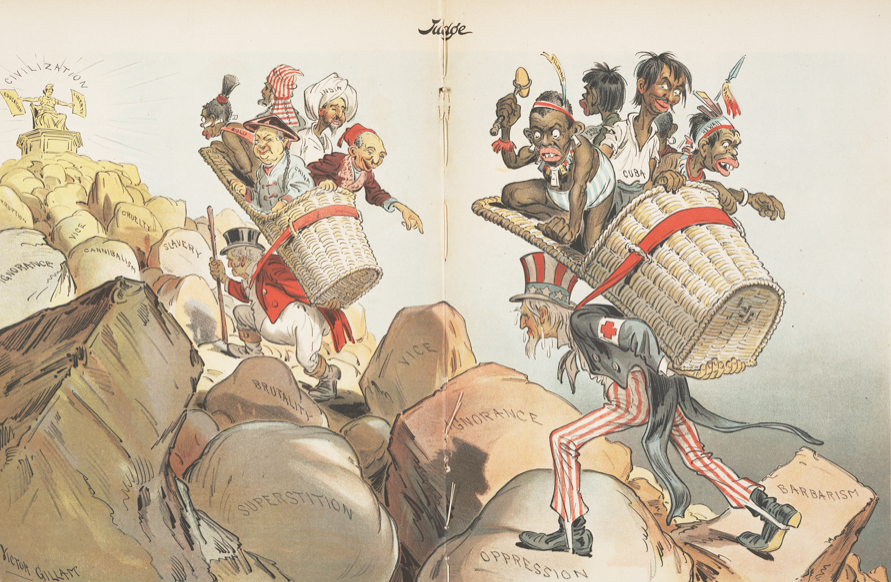
The editorial cartoon "The White Man's Burden (Apologies to Rudyard Kipling)" shows old white men John Bull and Uncle Sam delivering the world's people of colour to civilisation. The people in the basket carried by Uncle Sam are labelled Cuba, Hawaii, Samoa, "Porto Rico", and the Philippines, while the people in the basket carried by John Bull are labelled Zulu, China, India, "Soudan", and Egypt.

The term white savior is a critical description of a white person depicted as liberating, rescuing, or uplifting non-white people; it is critical in the sense that it describes a pattern in which people of color in economically under-developed nations that are majority non-white are denied agency and are seen as passive recipients of white benevolence.

The role is a modern-day version of "The White Man's Burden", a poem by Rudyard Kipling from 1899. The term has been associated with Africa, and certain characters in film and television have been critiqued as white savior figures.

Writer Teju Cole combined the term with "industrial complex" (derived from military–industrial complex and similarly applied elsewhere) to coin "White Savior Industrial Complex". Feminist and postcolonial scholars also argue that the trope is deeply gendered and classed, often centering white women’s humanitarianism as rescuing “Third World women” while obscuring local agency and structural causes.

== Usage ==
The concept of the white savior originates from the poem "The White Man's Burden" (1899) by Rudyard Kipling. Its original usage was in the context of the Philippines, but the term has since become associated primarily with Africa, as well as with other regions of the world.

=== Association with Africa ===
Africa has a history of slavery and of colonization. Damian Zane of BBC News said due to the history, Africans find the "white savior" attitude to help them "deeply patronising and offensive". Zane said, "Some argue that aid can be counter-productive, as it means African countries will continue to rely on outside help." Bhakti Shringarpure, writing for The Guardian, said, "Westerners trying to help poor, suffering countries have often been accused of having a 'white saviour complex': a term tied up in colonial history where Europeans descended to 'civilise' the African continent." The Washington Post's Karen Attiah said the white savior framework in Africa "follows the venerable tradition" of the novella Heart of Darkness (1899) by Joseph Conrad and that the tradition included the film Machine Gun Preacher (2011), the public relations campaign related to the documentary Kony 2012 (2012), and the writings of journalist Nicholas Kristof.

For example, actor and producer Louise Linton wrote a memoir about her gap year in Zambia, In Congo's Shadow, and wrote an article for The Telegraph, "How my dream gap year in Africa turned into a nightmare", to promote the book. Michael Schaub of Los Angeles Times said, "The reaction to Linton's article was swift and negative, accusing her of using clichés and misrepresentations... Several people have described Linton's memoir as a 'white savior' fantasy." Zambians and other Africans negatively criticized the article on social media. Attiah said the popular Instagram account "BarbieSavior" was inspired by the backlash to Linton's words. Special Broadcasting Service's Amal Awad said the Instagram account parodied "a reckless trend" of voluntourism (volunteering and touring) in which "'white saviours' use the less fortunate like props in their social media profiles". Awad said the interest in volunteering encouraged a business model that leverages a country's existing social issues and charges tourists for volunteering to be a "saviour".

Baaz, Gondola, Marijnen, and Verweijen, writing in Foreign Affairs, were critical of the "white savior complex" in the 2014 documentary Virunga, which features the Democratic Republic of the Congo's Virunga National Park and the conservation work of its park rangers. They said, "The movie features endless footage of a park guard hugging and playing with the gorillas, evoking the notion of the 'noble savage' who is close to nature, honest and naive, and dependent on the white man for his salvation. Rarely do we see the Congolese exercising political agency, even though there are numerous civil society activists in the region, often working at great personal risk."

For decades, the British charity Comic Relief sent white celebrities to African countries in order to film their emotional reactions to impoverished conditions as part of asking the public for money. In 2020, they suspended the practice after criticism that it perpetuated white-savior stereotypes. One of the key critics was British Labour Party politician David Lammy, who in 2019 criticized the charity for "white savior" media in its African campaign. Reuters reported, "Lammy, who is of Guyanese descent, said online photos... evoked negative stereotypes about Africa and its reliance on Western white people for help." The charity and its presenter Stacey Dooley initially argued against the criticism. The Uganda-based campaign group No White Saviors said of the controversy, "There are levels to the white savior complex. You can mean well, do some good along the way and actively be perpetuating the (white savior complex)." NBC News said No White Saviors "tries to raise awareness about the negative impact many 'mainly white' aid workers have had on 'black and brown communities in the name of charity or mission work'".

Musician and activist Bob Geldof has been called a white savior for organizing the 1985 Live Aid event to raise funds for Ethiopian famine relief. He called the accusation "the greatest load of bollocks ever".

=== Association with the Middle East ===
The term has been used to refer to white Americans and Europeans that independently partake or assist in Middle Eastern wars. T. E. Lawrence, "Lawrence of Arabia", can be seen as the prototypical white savior figure. Similar accusations have been made against white European men that traveled to fight alongside pro-democracy rebels in the Syrian civil war.

=== Protection of Muslim women ===
White feminists are sometimes categorized as white saviors when supporting causes relating to the protection of Muslim women, especially as the implication of Muslim men as oppressors is seen as Islamophobic. The case of Malala Yousafzai has been criticized as advancing white saviorism in Pakistan, due to her high approval in the West and her life having been saved by white doctors.

== In media ==
=== Appearance in film ===
In film, the white savior is a cinematic trope in which a white character rescues people of color from their plight. The white savior is portrayed as messianic and often learns something about themselves in the process of rescuing. The trope reflects how media represents race relations by racializing concepts like morality as identifiable with white people over nonwhite people. White saviors are often male and are sometimes out of place in their own society until they lead minorities or foreigners. Screen Saviors: Hollywood Fictions of Whiteness labels the stories as fantasies that "are essentially grandiose, exhibitionistic, and narcissistic". Types of stories include white travels to "exotic" Asian locations, white defense against racism in the American South, or white protagonists having "racially diverse" helpers.

The white lead character is often delegated the role of racial leader in films, taking it upon themselves to save non-white minorities and immigrants from their struggles. In the 2011 film The Help, set in 1963 in Jackson, Mississippi, a young white woman (played by Emma Stone) strives for a career in journalism and encourages black maids to share their personal experiences despite the racism prevalent at the time. This has been described as an example of a white main character exploiting the lives of under-served African Americans to financially benefit herself, without giving much relief to that community.

=== Appearance in television ===
Stephanie Greco Larson, writing in Media & Minorities: The Politics of Race in News and Entertainment, said Diff'rent Strokes (1978–1986) and Webster (1983–1987) were "shows in which white families adopt black children" and represented versions of "the white man's burden theme on television". Robin R. Means Coleman said, "In these comedies, Black children are rescued from their dysfunctional families or communities by Whites." In particular, Diff'rent Strokes featured the white millionaire character Philip Drummond. Film historian Donald Bogle said, "The millionaire Drummond becomes a great white father figure, able to provide the material comforts (as well as the subliminal emotional ones) and the cultural milieu that the Black community supposedly could never hope to match." Dustin Tahmahkera writes that Coleman labeled Drummond a "white savior" type who uses "his representational power to save the day by determining a conflict resolution that appeases all parties" including the indigenous representative Longwalker in the episode "Burial Ground". Tahmahkera also said a 1985 episode of Punky Brewster featured the girl protagonist telling a ghost story about her alter-ego Princess Moon helping "ancient Indians [who] suddenly appear... as cave dwellers who need a white savior... to defeat an evil spirit and help keep their Last of the Dogmen-like secret existence intact."

Larson said, "Inner-city schools have been the site of white man's burden dramas on television for decades" with TV series featuring white savior teachers. Larson identified the following series with such teachers: Room 222 (1969–1974), Welcome Back, Kotter (1975–1979), The White Shadow (1978–1981), and Boston Public (2000–2004). Larson said while Room 222 and Boston Public also had black teachers that "challenge the assumption that blacks are inherently inferior... these shows continue to avoid laying blame on social institutions for the status of blacks by showing the success of the individual black teachers."

=== Appearance in comic books ===
The Marvel Comics character Iron Fist has been criticized as a white savior character. When the character was adapted in the TV series Iron Fist (2017–2018), The New York Times reported before the show premiered that the casting had received criticism for not changing the character to be Asian-American. The newspaper quoted arguments put forward by Keith Chow, editor-in-chief of The Nerds of Color pop culture blog, "If you’re going to have all these trappings of Orientalism on top of a white savior trope, why not upend both of those things by casting an Asian-American to play the role?" Iron Fist actor Finn Jones denied that Danny Rand would be a white savior figure and said that the series would address critics' concerns. In 2021, Marvel responded by having Rand retire the mantle and introducing a Chinese successor, Lin Lie.

=== Celebrity humanitarianism and adoption ===
High-profile Hollywood celebrities have taken on humanitarian roles, and also been criticized for embodying the white savior complex, particularly those who have adopted children from economically underdeveloped environment or countries, or have undertaken publicized trips to underdeveloped countries. Figures such as Bono, Bob Geldof, George Clooney, Madonna, Angelina Jolie, Charlize Theron, Bill Gates and Lady Gaga have become associated with initiatives to alleviate poverty, combat conflict, and support disaster-struck areas in Africa, South Sudan, Malawi, and Haiti respectively.

== White savior industrial complex ==
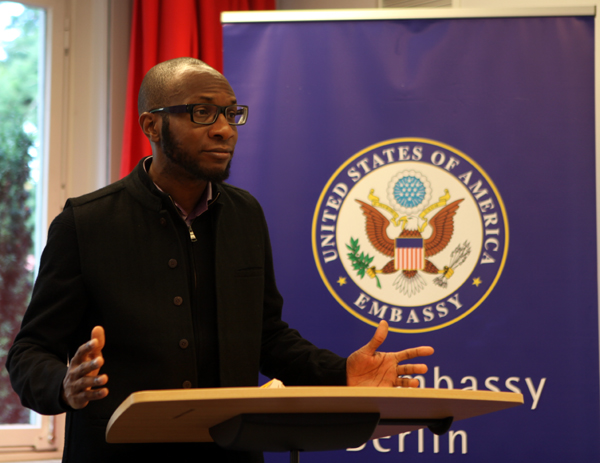
Writer Teju Cole, who coined the term white savior industrial complex

Writer Teju Cole coined the term white savior industrial complex following the release of the documentary Kony 2012 in March 2012, extrapolating the term in a seven-part response on Twitter. He later wrote an article for The Atlantic about the term, in which he said

1. From Sachs to Kristof to Invisible Children to TED, the fastest growth industry in the US is the White Savior Industrial Complex.
2. The white savior supports brutal policies in the morning, founds charities in the afternoon, and receives awards in the evening.
3. The banality of evil transmutes into the banality of sentimentality. The world is nothing but a problem to be solved by enthusiasm.
4. This world exists simply to satisfy the needs--including, importantly, the sentimental needs--of white people and Oprah.
5. The White Savior Industrial Complex is not about justice. It is about having a big emotional experience that validates privilege.
6. Feverish worry over that awful African warlord. But close to 1.5 million Iraqis died from an American war of choice. Worry about that.
7. I deeply respect American sentimentality, the way one respects a wounded hippo. You must keep an eye on it, for you know it is deadly.

Cole's response became a viral phenomenon, and The Guardian's Bhakti Shringarpure reflected on the supportive Internet response to the Kony 2012 political campaign, "With the prevalence of campaigns, apps and games calling on us to help without really putting ourselves out, it seems that the white saviour idea is still alive and well – but now, the mode is digital." Heather Laine Talley, writing in Saving Face: Disfigurement and the Politics of Appearance, said of the response to Cole coining the term, "The very idea of the white savior industrial complex was met with both celebration and rage. Cole was alternately described as a truth teller and as a racist." Talley summarized Cole's response to his critics, "Ultimately, Cole implores Western (white) do-gooders to rethink doing good in two ways. First, own up to the motives that drive philanthropic interventions, so that personal catharsis does not subsume the real need of others. Second, consider the structural underpinnings and historical legacies that together sustain the very infrastructure of the problems that captivate our activist hearts."

Tim Engles, writing in Rhetorics of Whiteness: Postracial Hauntings in Popular Culture, Social Media, and Education, concurred with Cole's assessment, "The lack of real-world efficacy of their efforts, and the apparent unwillingness of most to go any further than such limited and self-aggrandizing steps, suggests that mere validation of white racial privilege was indeed the most significant outcome."

In essence, Cole's concept of the "White Savior Industrial Complex" refers explicitly to the damaging effects of white saviors who prioritize a "big emotional experience" achieved through minor acts of charity or activism over tackling larger issues like systematic oppression and corruption that plague many nations around the world – notably, issues that are often directly caused or perpetuated by the United States.

== See also ==
- Baizuo – Derogatory Chinese neologism
- Christian mission – Organized effort to spread Christianity
- Civilizing mission – Rationale or justification for colonialism
- Colonial amnesia – Concept in postcolonial studies (the phenomenon of forgetting colonial history or remembering it in certain ways that erase the history of the colonized people)
- Development theory – Theories about how desirable change in society is best achieved
- Economic growth – Measure of increase in market value of goods
- Green imperialism – Political phenomenon
- International volunteering – Paid travel which includes volunteering for a charitable cause
- Manifest destiny – 19th-century expansionist belief in the U.S.
- Nostalgia for apartheid – Nostalgia for life in South Africa 1948–94
- Progress – Movement towards a desired state
- Savior complex – Belief that one is responsible for assisting others
- Westsplaining – Political interpretation of Eastern European events by Westerners
- White gods – Fringe theories about the origin of some gods
- White guilt – White people's guilt for racist harms
