= Politics of memory =

Political influence on collective memory

The politics of memory refers to how societies construct, contest, and institutionalize collective memories of historical events. Often this practice should serve political, social, or ideological purpose. As a field of study, memory politics seeks to examine how memory is shaped by power dynamics, national identity, trauma, and commemoration, and how it influences current politics and social relations. Since the politics of memory may determine the way history is written, framed and passed on, the terms history politics or politics of history are also commonly used. This field intersects with history, sociology, political science, and cultural studies.

== Theoretical foundations ==
=== Individual memory, collective memory and history ===
The individual or communicative memory is short-term and personal. Collective memory and history are both long term and institutionalized. While a distinction is less clear, collective memory is more often presented as fluid, while history as static, defined by facts.

Maurice Halbwachs introduced the idea that memory is socially constructed, meaning that it is shaped by families, religions, and communities (incl. nations) rather than being purely individual. Collective memory is therefore always selective and serves group identities and social cohesion. This memory can also be influenced, which makes power relations inherit to collective memory. While memory is lived, collective, and dynamic, tied to identity and tradition, history is a critical, intellectual reconstruction of the past that often disrupts or replaces spontaneous memory. In the name of history and commemoration, modern societies create "sites of memory" (monuments, archives, rituals) to stabilize national identity amid rapid change. Similarly, the term cultural memory coined by Aleida Assmann is applied to show how states and societies selectively transmit memory across generations through education, memorials, and archives. Yet, since memory is not something static, such "sites of memory" only capture the narrative of a certain past event at one point in time and often only from one perspective, politicizing the sites.

Some historians argue that memory studies risk relativizing factual history by treating all narratives as socially constructed.

=== Memory as a political tool ===
Power relations are inherent within these constructions of the past. Dominant groups often strive to impose their interpretations of reality, that bolster their own interests, as the universally accepted truth, thus establishing a mnemonic hegemony. This hegemonic control over collective memory can be a tool for maintaining existing power structures by controlling people's memory, also their momentum, their experience, and their knowledge is controlled.

==== Nationalism ====
Nations are not just political entities, but narrative constructs, supported by a carefully cultivated historical consciousness. Benedict Anderson argues the power of nationalism lies not in its truth but in its persuasive myth, which creates a past that binds communities together through shared memory and collective forgetting. While the shared memory forges collective identity, the suppression of traumas helps to maintain unity. This strategy of nation building brings unresolved tensions with it, mainly because marginalized groups are spoken for and also because counter narratives tend to emerge and challenge the constructed one.

==== Counter-memories ====
However, the control being exercised over the collective memory is never absolute. Where there is power, there is resistance. Counter-narratives and counter-memories emerge from those whose experiences and recollections are marginalized or excluded from official histories. How these narratives are being expressed can take different shapes or forms, depending not only, but also on culture, gender and political climate.

== Mnemonic formations ==
To study the politics of memory and it's impacts, Johanna Mannergren et al. coined the following four mnemonic formations for analysis.

=== Sites ===
==== Monuments ====
Spatial markers of memory such as monuments play a crucial role in inscribing a historical narrative into the landscape, an act described by Herfried Münkler as the monumentalization of the landscape. When successor states inherit the monumental landscape of the ancien régime often heated debates errupt on the fate of such monuments. New regimes of memory may neglect, appropriate or physically remove monuments. However, their removals may be controversial: in Estonia the removal of a Soviet era statue from the capital evoked strong reaction from Russia.

== Global examples ==
=== Armenia and Turkey ===
Armenia and Turkey maintain strongly divergent official narratives on the events of 1915, known as the Armenian Genocide. While Armenian official historiography sees in it a deliberate attempt to irrevocably cleanse the Eastern provinces of the Ottoman Empire of its indigenous Armenian populations that stands in continuity of a longer history of Anti-Armenian pogroms, Turkish official historiography denies the extent of state violence and sees in the events of 1915 merely a resettlement campaign (tehcir) provoked by hostilities of Armenian nationalist organizations backed by Tsarist Russia. In contrast to Turkish official historiography, the Kurdish political movement within Turkey widely recognizes the events as a genocide, though marginalizing the role of Kurdish complicity in the killings.

=== Cyprus ===
The two sides in the conflict in Cyprus maintain widely divergent and contrasting memories of the events that split the island. The term selective memory is applied by psychologists to people suffering from head injuries who retain some memories, but have amnesia about others. Societal trauma, such as war, seems to have a similar effect. Recollections that are shaped out of a phenomenon common to many countries traumatized by war and repression, may be remembered in radically different ways by people who experienced similar events.

The selectivity may also serve a political purpose, for example to justify the claims of one group over a competing group. Cyprus is a poignant case for this phenomenon. The longstanding conflict on the island reflects deep roots in the "motherlands" of the Greek Cypriot and Turkish Cypriot peoples.

=== Germany ===
In Germany, the term "politics of history"/"history politics" (Geschichtspolitik) was propounded by German historian Christian Meier in 1986 during the Historikerstreit discussion on how to memorialise Nazi Germany and World War II.

Speeches by politicians often deal with issues of how to memorialize the past. Richard von Weizsäcker as Bundespräsident identified two modes of memorializing the unconditional surrender of Nazi Germany in 1945 in his famous 1985 speech: this date can be seen as defeat or liberation. Weizsäcker backed the latter interpretation. In this regard, such moments as the first official "Day of Commemoration for Victims of National Socialism", on January 20, 1996, led to Bundespräsident Roman Herzog remarking in his address to the German Parliament that "Remembrance gives us strength, since it helps to keep us from going astray." In similar, but somewhat opposing measure, Gerhard Schröder sought to move beyond this in saying the generation that committed such deeds has passed, and a new generation does not have the same fault because they simply weren't there to be responsible.

Good examples for politics of memory could be seen in national monuments and the discourses surrounding their construction. The construction of a Holocaust memorial in memory of the murdered Jews of Europe at a central location in Berlin was met with protests but also with strong support. Likewise the National Memorial to the Victims of War and Tyranny was deemed inappropriate by some onlookers and a discussion revolved around the question whether the lack of a differentiation between victims and perpetrators is adequate or not.

The question if and how to memorise Germans expelled from Poland in the aftermath of World War II has been constantly debated in both West Germany and Poland. Such questions are so difficult because it requires a moral judgement of these events. These judgements differ remarkably. For instance, the Federation of German Expellees called on Poland to pay compensation for lost property to Germans from what after 1945 became Polish territory, a claim that is consistently declined by Poland.

Similarly there have been debates in Germany whether the legacy of World War II implies that Germany's military should be confined to purely defensive measure like peacekeeping or, contrary to this, this legacy can be a justification of an active enforcement of human rights which also might involve preemptive strikes.

=== Poland ===
In Poland, the issue of history politics have risen to the state level when in 2015 it was announced that the works had started on the "Strategy of Polish Historical Policy" ("Strategia Polskiej Polityki Historycznej"). President Andrzej Duda announced that "carrying out the historical policy is one of the most important activities of the president".

=== Russia ===
The history in Russia has been highly politicized since the times of the Soviet Union. In the 2000s, Vladimir Putin's regime undertook a new revision of history under the pretext of the defense of the national past against the alleged slanderers. As a first step of this defense was the establishment of the commission to handle "the attempts to falsify history to the detriment of Russia's interests" in May 2009.

The central topic of the new "history politics" has become World War II.

The 2018 book of Mariëlle Wijermars Memory Politics in Contemporary Russia Television, Cinema and the State analyses the effects of various actors, such as the government, the Russian Orthodox Church, cultural figures, and radical thinkers, such as Aleksandr Dugin, on Russian memory politics, and its usage in legitimizing the government and discrediting the opposition.

=== Sudan ===
During the Islamic rule of Omar al-Bashir from 1989 until 2019, women and their bodies played a central role in the Sudanese state's efforts to reshape collective memory. Sondra Hale highlights how Sudanese women in conflict zones resist those efforts through "memory work", which becomes a form of resistance against state narratives and the erasure of their roles in historical events. Hale's work demonstrates how marginalized groups actively reclaim their own versions of the past, challenge dominant interpretations and demanding recognition.

=== Ukraine ===
Andrew Wilson notes of the moment of Ukrainian independence in 1991: "There were no real fireworks, no national martyrs, and no real liberation mythology to sustain Ukrainian independence in more difficult times", arguing that liberation myths that Ukraine did have from 1917-1920 and the 1940s were divisive.

According to political scientist and historian Georgiy Kasianov, nationalist memory politics was a local phenomenon in Ukraine in the 1990s, being popularised to a greater extent in the 2000s. Kasianov asserts that after the Revolution of Dignity in 2014, the nationalist memory narrative became an integral part of a "national heroic myth" aimed at mobilising against Russian aggression with the Ukrainian Institute of National Memory being under the control of nationalist forces from 2015 until 2019.

=== Yugoslavia ===
Croatian researcher Snježana Koren analyzed the history politics in Yugoslavia by analyzing teaching of history at school during 1945-1960, an immediate aftermath of World War II. She traced both internal and external influences on the state's politics of history, in particular how it was affected by the affiliation with the Soviet Union and the subsequent Soviet-Yugoslav split. She also analyzed the differences in the narratives in different Yugoslav republics.

== In literature ==
Milan Kundera's opening story in the Book of Laughter and Forgetting is about a Slovak official posing with other officials for a photograph in winter. The man gives his fur hat to cover his superior's bald head and the photo is taken. Later, when he falls out of favour and is denounced and removed from official records and documents, he is even air-brushed out of photographs; all that remains of him is his fur hat.

Winston Churchill is purported to have said that "history is written by the victors." The accuracy and significance of this statement is still debated.

== See also ==
- Agnotology – Study of culturally induced ignorance or doubt
- Culture of remembrance
- Cultural memory
- Damnatio memoriae – Exclusion of a person from official records and accounts
- De-commemoration
- Historical negationism – Distortion of historical record
- Invented tradition – Recently invented cultural practices perceived as old
- Memorialization
- Memory hole – Fictional device in Nineteen Eighty-Four
- Memory law – Legal provision governing interpretation of historical events
- Memory war – Dispute over historical interpretation
- National memory
- Official history – Work of history which is sponsored or endorsed by its subject
- Pact of Forgetting
- Politics of identity – Politics based on one's identity
- Selective omission
- Social amnesia – Collective forgetting by a group of people
  - Colonial amnesia
- Truth-seeking
- The Use and Abuse of History – 1981 book by Marc Ferro
- Vergangenheitsbewältigung – Societal activities for coping with the past
