= Democratic Memory Law =

Spanish law enacted 2022 regarding Francoism's legacy

Cortes Generales
- Long title: Law 20/2022, of 19 October, of Democratic Memory
- Citation: BOE-A-2022-17099
- Enacted by: Congress of Deputies
- Enacted by: Senate
- Assented to by: Felipe VI
- Royal assent: 19 October 2022
- Effective: 21 October 2022

Legislative history

Initiating chamber: Congress of Deputies
- Introduced by: Second government of Pedro Sánchez
- Introduced: 30 August 2021
- Passed: 14 July 2022
- Voting summary: 173 voted for; 159 voted against; 14 abstained

Revising chamber: Senate
- Passed: 5 October 2022
- Voting summary: 128 voted for; 113 voted against; 18 abstained

Repeals
- Historical Memory Law
- Status: In force

The Law of Democratic Memory (Spanish: Ley de Memoria Democrática) is a law in Spain which came into effect in October 2022, concerning the legacy of Francoist Spain. The Law seeks to promote knowledge of the history of democracy in Spain and to maintain the memory of the victims of the Spanish Civil War and the Francoist Dictatorship through initiatives such as the creation of a Register of Victims, to recognise a right of investigation and to know the truth about the circumstances of a victim's death, and to remove some remaining symbols of the dictatorship.

== Background ==
After the death of Francisco Franco in 1975, the Spanish transition to democracy saw the birth of the Pact of Forgetting, where both leftist and rightist parties of Spain decided to avoid confronting directly the legacy of Francoism. Because of the Pact (expressed most clearly in the 1977 Amnesty Law), there were no prosecutions for persons responsible for human rights violations or similar crimes committed during the Francoist period, no exhumations of mass graves, Francoist public memorials remained standing, and the Francoist "Day of Victory" celebration was changed to "Armed Forces Day", celebrating both Nationalist and Republican parties of the Spanish Civil War.

In 2007, the government of Prime Minister José Luis Rodríguez Zapatero passed the Historical Memory Law, formally condemning the repressions of the Franco regime and giving certain rights to the victims and the descendants of victims of the Civil War and the subsequent dictatorship. However, the law attracted criticism, with some on the left arguing that it does not go far enough and with the conservative People's Party arguing that it was "using the Civil War as an argument for political propaganda."

On 18 June 2018, the government of Pedro Sánchez announced its intention to remove Franco's remains from the Valle de los Caídos, the monument to the Civil War on the outskirts of Madrid. On 24 August 2018, Sánchez's cabinet approved a decree that modifies two aspects of the 2007 Historical Memory Law to allow the exhumation of Franco's remains from the Valle de los Caídos. After a year of legal battles with Franco's descendants, the exhumation took place on 24 October 2019, and Franco was reburied at Mingorrubio Cemetery in El Pardo with his wife Carmen Polo.

== Summary ==
In 2020, the Sánchez government announced its intentions to introduce a new law to address the legacy of Francoism. On 15 September 2020, the cabinet approved a draft bill to be presented to parliament. The law passed the upper house of parliament on 5 October 2022, and came into effect on 21 October 2022.

The bill includes a provision to ensure secondary school, Spanish Baccalaureate, and vocational training students are taught about the dictatorship. The bill also declares the tens of thousands of convictions for military rebellion against Franco from 1936 to 1938 void, but bars those targeted by the illegitimate convictions from suing the government for compensation.

As well, the law renders the government responsible for exhuming and identifying the bodies of those murdered by the fascist regime and buried in unmarked graves. It creates an official register of victims to connect currently scattered information about the victims and would include the possibility of DNA testing to help locate surviving relatives. The law also redefines the Valley of the Fallen monument as a national cemetery for people killed on both sides of the civil war, with no remains to be placed in particular prominence.

The law also intends to finally remove a number of remaining Francoist symbols from the country, including the possibility of issuing fines of €200 to €150,000 for those who promote francoist symbols. It also abolished 33 titles of nobility awarded by the Franco regime and would dissolve the Francisco Franco National Foundation.

The law offers Spanish citizenship to the children of Spanish exiles who had fled from the Franco regime. The 2007 Historical Memory Law had excluded children of exiles who had changed or renounced their Spanish citizenship; the new law entitles any descendant of Spanish immigrants born before 1985 – the year Spain changed its nationality law – to citizenship. This now includes the grandchildren of people exiled under the Franco dictatorship, and the descendants of women who had lost their citizenship on marrying non-Spaniards. It is estimated that 700,000 people could be eligible for citizenship under the new "grandchildren law".

Some confusion was caused after deputy PM Pablo Iglesias tweeted that "the descendants of the members of the International Brigades who fought for freedom and against fascism in Spain will be eligible for Spanish nationality", but the draft bill only included posthumous citizenship for the veterans of the International Brigades. Jim Jump, chair of the International Brigade Memorial Trust said that, as all the anti-fascist veterans were now deceased, the provision was "a welcome gesture" but "mainly symbolic."

== Reception ==
PSOE politician and Secretary-General of the Office of the Prime Minister of Spain Félix Bolaños argued that it was "the first law to repudiate the coup of 1936" and that "No democratic force should have any problems paying tribute to the victims of a dictatorship." Far-right party Vox pledged to repeal the law if they were to gain power in the next Spanish general election. The former leader of the centre-right People's Party Pablo Casado stated that all it did was "dig up grudges." FE de las JONS, for its part, alleged that the Democratic Memory Law constitutes a form of "political persecution", stating that it "is a political weapon aimed at supporting a single way of thinking" and "a historical revisionism of a past period that should no longer affect the present".

== Aftermath ==
In early 2024, the far-right Vox and the centre-right People's Party coalition governments of the autonomous communities (regions) of Aragón, Castilla y León, and Valencia proposed laws they called Harmony Laws attempting to replace or reinterpret the national Democratic Memory Law in these communities. On 30 April 2024 three UN experts on truth, justice, forced disappearances and killings wrote a letter to the Spanish Government condemning these proposed laws as potentially contravening international human rights standards and insisting that Spain had a duty to victims of forced disappearances.

In June 2023 the first prosecutor was appointed in charge of human rights and democratic memory with the power to investigate cases of missing persons or violations of human rights, a key element of the Democratic Memory Law. In May 2024, the Supreme Court nullified the appointment and required that the appointment be considered by the full Council of the Attorney General, citing the possible conflict of interest of the prosecutor's husband's work running a human rights foundation. On 23 July 2024, the Council of the Attorney General confirmed the prosecutor's appointment.

== See also ==
- Memory laws
