= Memory war =

Dispute over historical interpretation

A memory war is a political dispute over the interpretation or memorialization of a historical event. It is applied especially to disputes in Central and Eastern Europe over the interpretation of World War II.

== Early use of the term ==
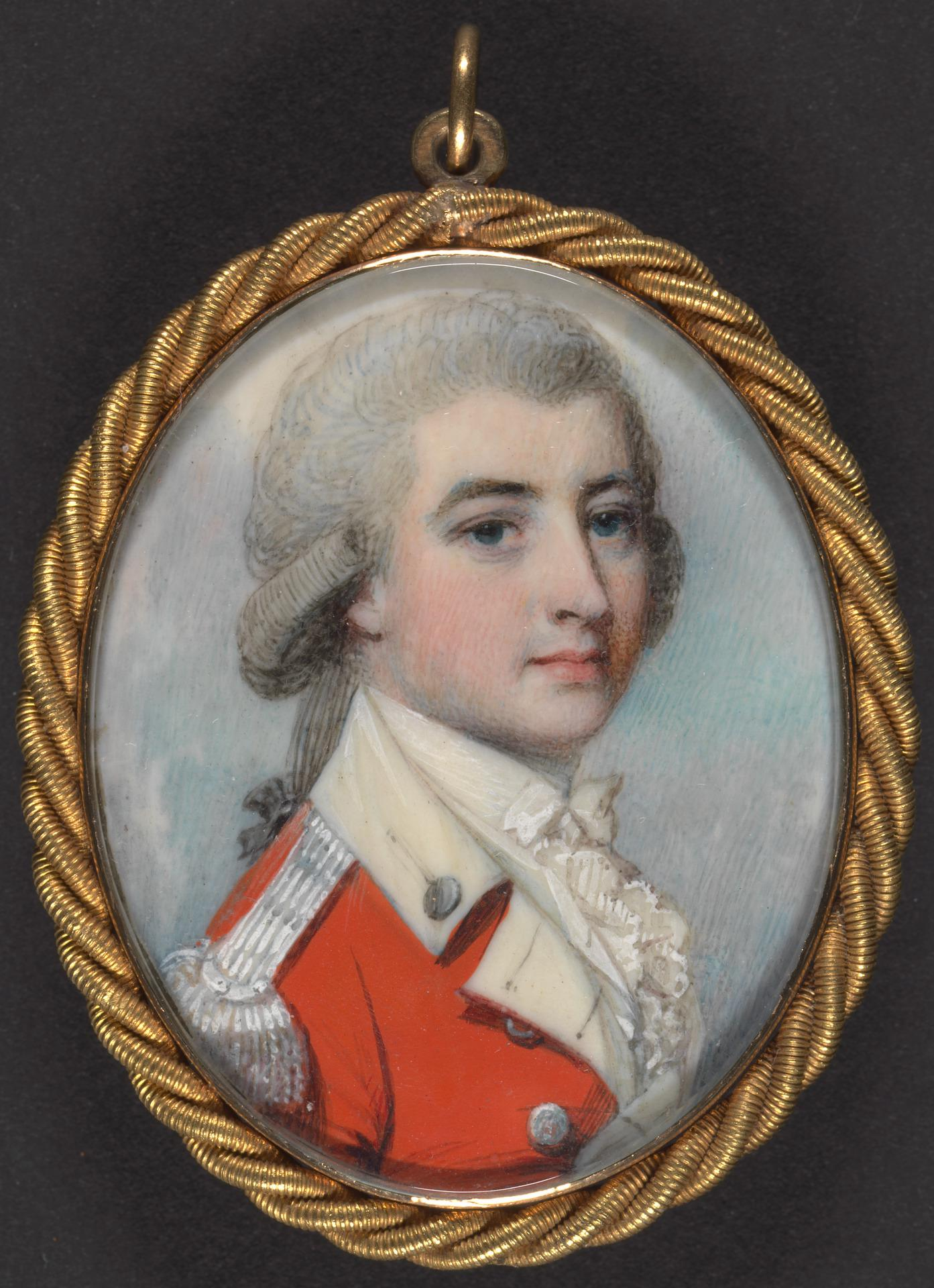
Major André

A 1997 article in the Journal of the Early Republic—which focuses on the United States history from 1776 to 1861—used the term "memory wars" in its examination of the capture and subsequent execution of British Major John André.

== German preoccupation with the Nazi past ==
In her 2005 article for Central European History, historian Mary Nolan identified a marked shift in German public discourse since 2002 from a focus on German guilt to a growing emphasis on German suffering, especially regarding the civilian experience of the Allied air war. Nolan argued that this renewed attention to German victimhood represents a collective preoccupation within German society and is indicative of an ongoing "memory war," in which competing narratives about the nation's past are actively contested.

== Role of memory wars in peace and reconciliation ==
Sociologist Stanley Cohen's main message in his 2001 Index on Censorship article "Memory wars and peace commissions" is that confronting past atrocities through peace commissions and truth-telling is complicated by competing narratives, selective memory, and denial. Cohen argues that legal and institutional solutions are often insufficient for true reconciliation due to conflicting versions of history and emotional resistance. He notes scholarly interest in the late 1990s and early 2000s stems from the challenge of transitional justice—how democratizing societies address crimes by prior regimes—and from questions about "collective memory," including whether societies remember or forget the past like individuals do, and how memory can be shaped by both democratic participation and state-organized "memory work" such as memorials and ceremonies.

== Recent developments: China, Russia, and memory wars ==
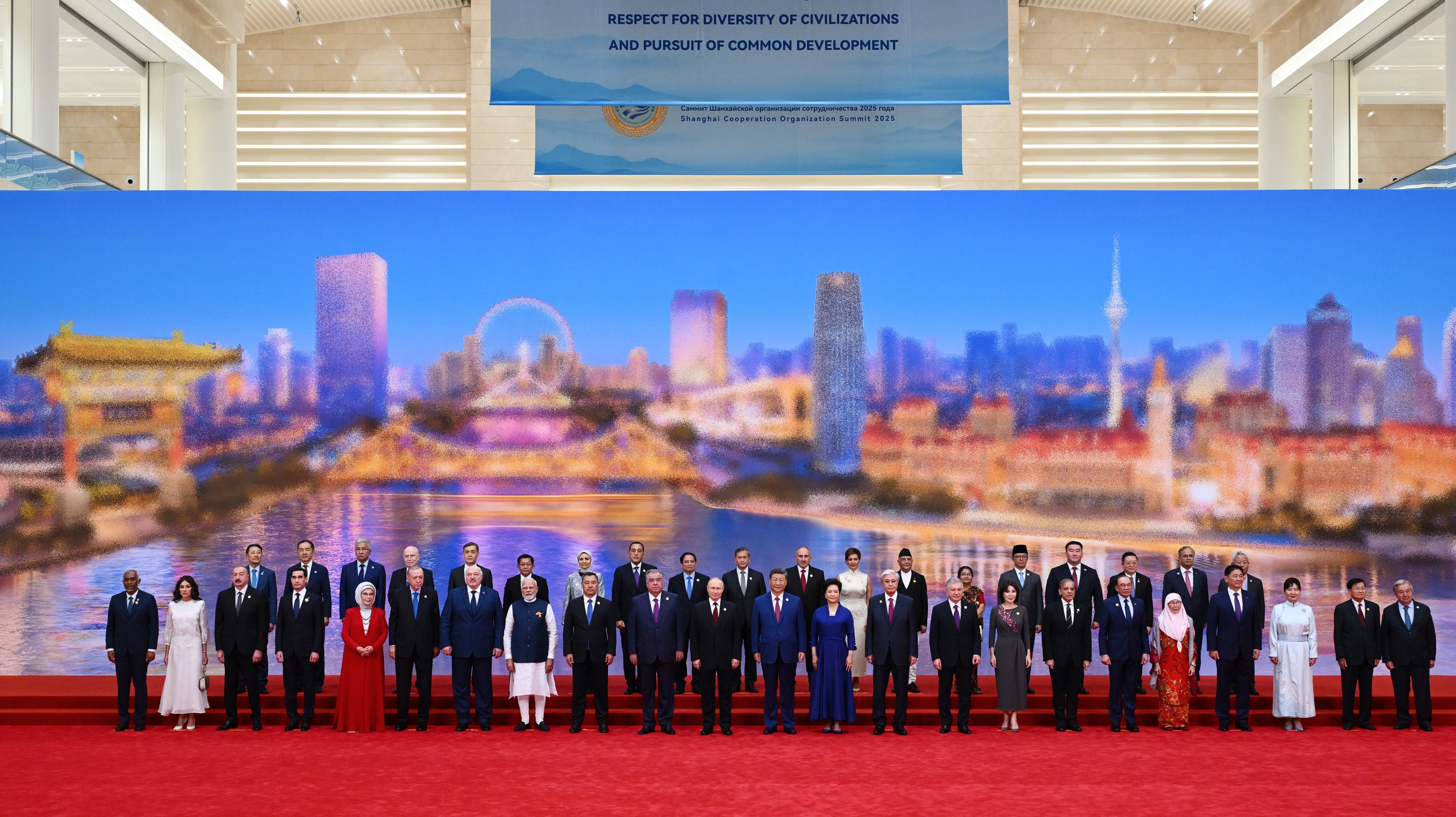
2025 SCO Summit

According to a 2025 New York Times article and analysis by scholars at the Brookings Institution, large-scale military parades in China and Russia are more than displays of martial power and national pride; they are also strategic tools in an ongoing "memory war." The Times article referred to the September 2025 meeting of the Shanghai Cooperation Organisation (SCO) which brought together ten heads of state in Tianjin, China, including Xi Jinping, Vladimir Putin, Narendra Modi. Through such events, China and Russia promote alternative versions of World War II history that challenge the Western narrative of Allied victory; the latter narrative is often centered on the contributions of the United States and Western Europe. These preferred historical memories serve several goals, including emphasizing the sacrifices and roles of China and the Soviet Union in defeating fascism, legitimizing contemporary territorial and strategic claims, and advocating for their vision of a "postwar international order" rooted in agreements like the 1943 Cairo Declaration and Potsdam Declaration. In this way, public commemorations are mobilized as instruments of geopolitical contestation, shaping international perceptions and reinforcing national identity.

== See also ==
- Memory studies – Field of psychology
- Politics of memory – Political influence on collective memory
