= 1977 Spanish Amnesty Law =

Impunity for crimes during and since the Spanish Civil War

1977 Amnesty Law

Cortes Generales
- Long title: Law 46/1977, of 15 October, of amnesty
- Citation: BOE-A-1977-24937
- Enacted by: Congress of Deputies
- Assented to by: Juan Carlos I
- Royal assent: 15 October 1977
- Effective: 17 October 1977

Legislative history
- Passed: 14 October 1977
- Voting summary: 296 voted for; 2 voted against; 18 abstained; 1 present not voting
- Status: In force

The 1977 Spanish Amnesty Law is a law passed by the Parliament of Spain and given royal assent on October 15, 1977, two years after Francisco Franco's death. The Law freed political prisoners and permitted those exiled to return to Spain, but also guaranteed impunity for those who participated in crimes, during the Civil War, and in Francoist Spain. The law is still in force, and has been used as a reason for not investigating and prosecuting Francoist human rights violations.

The Act was the clearest and most explicit expression of Spain's "pact of forgetting"—a decision among Spanish parties and political actors, during and after the Spanish transition to democracy, not to address atrocities committed by the Spanish State. The 1977 Amnesty Law has been criticized by scholars for equating "victims and victimizers" and for shielding human rights violators from prosecution and punishment. Spain has argued that perpetrators of crimes against humanity cannot be prosecuted for crimes committed before 1939; however, the UN takes the view that the Francoist era crimes should be investigated. In February 2012, the United Nations High Commissioner for Human Rights demanded the 1977 Amnesty Law to be repealed, on the basis that it violates international human rights law. The Commissioner referred to Spain's obligation to comply with the International Covenant on Civil and Political Rights. Under international human rights law, there is no statute of limitations for crimes against humanity. In 2013, a UN working group of experts again called upon Spain to repeal the 1977 law.

In 2008, Judge Baltasar Garzón briefly began an official inquiry, symbolically indicting Franco for the disappearance of more than 100,000 people. In 2009, Manos Limpias, a far-right union, brought criminal charges against the judge, for defying the amnesty law. Garzón was acquitted of the charges of "knowingly acting without jurisdiction", relating to his investigation of Francoist crimes, but was then disbarred for 11 years by the Spanish Supreme Court in 2012, on an unrelated charge.

Since 2010, Argentinian judge María Servini de Cubría has been investigating civil rights abuses under the Franco regime. In 2018, she agreed to extend her investigation to include crimes specifically against women.

== See also ==
- 2022 Democratic Memory Law regarding Francoism's legacy
- 2007 Historical Memory Law regarding Francoism's legacy
