= Collective memory =

Shared knowledge and values of a social group

Collective memory is the shared pool of memories, knowledge and information of a social group that is significantly associated with the group's identity. The English phrase "collective memory" and the equivalent French phrase mémoire collective appeared in the second half of the nineteenth century. The philosopher and sociologist Maurice Halbwachs analyzed and advanced the concept of the collective memory in the book Les cadres sociaux de la mémoire ("The Social Frameworks of Memory")(1925).

Collective memory can be constructed, shared, and passed on by large and small social groups. Examples of these groups can include nations, generations, communities, among others.

Collective memory has been a topic of interest and research across a number of disciplines, including psychology, sociology, history, philosophy, and anthropology.

== Conceptualization of collective memory ==
=== Attributes of collective memory ===
Collective memory has been conceptualized in several ways and proposed to have certain attributes. For instance, collective memory can refer to a shared body of knowledge (e.g., memory of a nation's past leaders or presidents); the image, narrative, values and ideas of a social group; or the continuous process by which collective memories of events change.

=== History versus collective memory ===
The difference between history and collective memory is best understood when comparing the aims and characteristics of each. A goal of history broadly is to provide a comprehensive, accurate, and unbiased portrayal of past events. This often includes the representation and comparison of multiple perspectives and the integration of these perspectives and details to provide a complete and accurate account. In contrast, collective memory focuses on a single perspective, for instance, the perspective of one social group, nation, or community. Consequently, collective memory represents past events as associated with the values, narratives and biases specific to that group. Some scholars have examined how dominant interpretive paradigms influence debates over contested wartime histories, including analyses by Marshall Wordsworth and others.

Studies have found that people from different nations can have major differences in their recollections of the past. In one study where American and Russian students were instructed to recall significant events from World War II and these lists of events were compared, the majority of events recalled by the American and Russian students were not shared. Differences in the events recalled and emotional views towards the Civil War, World War II and the Iraq War have also been found in a study comparing collective memory between generations of Americans.

=== Perspectives on collective memory ===
The concept of collective memory, initially developed by Halbwachs, has been explored and expanded from various angles – a few of these are introduced below.

James E. Young has introduced the notion of 'collected memory' (opposed to collective memory), marking memory's inherently fragmented, collected and individual character, while Jan Assmann develops the notion of 'communicative memory', a variety of collective memory based on everyday communication. This form of memory resembles the exchanges in oral cultures or the memories collected (and made collective) through oral tradition. As another subform of collective memories, Assmann mentions forms detached from the everyday; they can be particular materialized and fixed points as, e.g. texts and monuments.

The theory of collective memory was also discussed by former Hiroshima resident and atomic-bomb survivor, Kiyoshi Tanimoto, in a tour of the United States as an attempt to rally support and funding for the reconstruction of his Memorial Methodist Church in Hiroshima. He theorized that the use of the atomic bomb had forever added to the world's collective memory and would serve in the future as a warning against such devices. See John Hersey's 1946 book Hiroshima.

Historian Guy Beiner (1968- ), an authority on memory and the history of Ireland, has criticized the unreflective use of the adjective "collective" in many studies of memory:

The problem is with crude concepts of collectivity, which assume a homogeneity that is rarely, if ever, present, and maintain that, since memory is constructed, it is entirely subject to the manipulations of those invested in its maintenance, denying that there can be limits to the malleability of memory or to the extent to which artificial constructions of memory can be inculcated. In practice, the construction of a completely collective memory is at best an aspiration of politicians, which is never entirely fulfilled and is always subject to contestations.

In its place, Beiner has promoted the term "social memory" and has also demonstrated its limitations by developing a related concept of "social forgetting".

Historian David Rieff takes issue with the term "collective memory", distinguishing between memories of people who were actually alive during the events in question, and people who only know about them from culture or media. Rieff writes in opposition to George Santayana's aphorism "those who cannot remember the past are condemned to repeat it", pointing out that strong cultural emphasis on certain historical events (often wrongs against the group) can prevent resolution of armed conflicts, especially when the conflict has been previously fought to a draw. The sociologist David Leupold draws attention to the problem of structural nationalism inherent in the notion of collective memory, arguing in favor of "emancipating the notion of collective memory from being subjected to the national collective" by employing a multi-collective perspective that highlights the mutual interaction of other memory collectives that form around generational belonging, family, locality or socio-political world-views.

Pierre Lévy argues that the phenomenon of human collective intelligence undergoes a profound shift with the arrival of the internet paradigm, as it allows the vast majority of humanity to access and modify a common shared online collective memory.

== Collective memory and psychological research ==
Though traditionally a topic studied in the humanities, collective memory has become an area of interest in psychology. Common approaches taken in psychology to study collective memory have included investigating the cognitive mechanisms involved in the formation and transmission of collective memory; and comparing the social representations of history between social groups.

=== Social representations of history ===
Research on collective memory has compared how different social groups form their own representations of history and how such collective memories can impact ideals, values, behaviors and vice versa. Research has proposed that groups form social representations of history in order to develop their own social identity, as well as to evaluate the past, often in order to prevent past patterns of conflict and error from being repeated. Research has also compared differences in recollections of historical events, such as the examples given earlier when comparing history and collective memory.

Differences in collective memories between social groups, such as nations or states, have been attributed to collective narcissism and egocentric/ethnocentric bias. In one related study where participants from 35 countries were questioned about their country's contribution to world history and provided a percentage estimation from 0% to 100%, evidence for collective narcissism was found as many countries gave responses exaggerating their country's contribution. In another study where Americans from 50 states were asked similar questions regarding their state's contribution to the history of the United States, patterns of overestimation and collective narcissism were also found.

=== Cognitive mechanisms underlying collaborative recall ===
Certain cognitive mechanisms involved during group recall and the interactions between these mechanisms have been suggested to contribute to the formation of collective memory. Below are some mechanisms involved during when groups of individuals recall collaboratively.

==== Collaborative inhibition and retrieval disruption ====
When groups collaborate to recall information, they experience collaborative inhibition, a decrease in performance compared to the pooled memory recall of an equal number of individuals. Weldon and Bellinger (1997) and Basden, Basden, Bryner, and Thomas (1997) provided evidence that retrieval interference underlies collaborative inhibition, as hearing other members' thoughts and discussion about the topic at hand interferes with one's own organization of thoughts and impairs memory.

The main theoretical account for collaborative inhibition is retrieval disruption. During the encoding of information, individuals form their own idiosyncratic organization of the information. This organization is later used when trying to recall the information. In a group setting as members exchange information, the information recalled by group members disrupts the idiosyncratic organization one had developed. As each member's organization is disrupted, this results in the less information recalled by the group compared to the pooled recall of participants who had individually recalled (an equal number of participants as in the group).

Despite the problem of collaborative inhibition, working in groups may benefit an individual's memory in the long run, as group discussion exposes one to many different ideas over time. Working alone initially prior to collaboration seems to be the optimal way to increase memory.

Early speculations about collaborative inhibition have included explanations, such as diminished personal accountability, social loafing and the diffusion of responsibility, however retrieval disruption remains the leading explanation. Studies have found that collective inhibition to sources other than social loafing, as offering a monetary incentive have been evidenced to fail to produce an increase in memory for groups. Further evidence from this study suggest something other than social loafing is at work, as reducing evaluation apprehension – the focus on one's performance amongst other people – assisted in individuals' memories but did not produce a gain in memory for groups. Personal accountability – drawing attention to one's own performance and contribution in a group – also did not reduce collaborative inhibition. Therefore, group members' motivation to overcome the interference of group recall cannot be achieved by several motivational factors.

==== Cross-cueing ====
Information exchange among group members often helps individuals to remember things that they would not have remembered had they been working alone. In other words, the information provided by person A may 'cue' memories in person B. This results in enhanced recall. During a group recall, an individual might not remember as much as they would on their own, as their memory recall cues may be distorted because of other team members. Nevertheless, this has enhanced benefits, team members can remember something specific to the disruption of the group. Cross-cueing plays a role in formulation of group recall (Barber, 2011).

==== Collective false memories ====
In 2010, a study was done to see how individuals remembered a bombing that occurred in the 1980s. The clock was later set at 10.25 to remember the tragic bomb (de Vito et al. 2009). The individuals were asked to remember if the clock at Bologna central station in Italy had remained functioning, everyone said no, in fact it was the opposite (Legge, 2018). There have been many instances in history where people create a false memory. In a 2003 study done in the Claremont Graduate University, results demonstrated that during a stressful event and the actual event are managed by the brain differently. Other instances of false memories may occur when remembering something on an object that is not actually there or mistaking how someone looks in a crime scene (Legge, 2018). It is possible for people to remember the same false memories; some people call it the "Mandela effect". The name "Mandela effect" comes from the name of South African civil rights leader Nelson Mandela whom many people falsely believed was dead. (Legge, 2018). The Pandora Box experiment explains that language complexes the mind more when it comes to false memories. Language plays a role with imaginative experiences, because it makes it hard for humans to gather correct information (Jablonka, 2017).

==== Error pruning ====
Compared to recalling individually, group members can provide opportunities for error pruning during recall to detect errors that would otherwise be uncorrected by an individual.

==== Social contagion errors ====
Group settings can also provide opportunities for exposure to erroneous information that may be mistaken to be correct or previously studied.

==== Re-exposure effects ====
Listening to group members recall the previously encoded information can enhance memory as it provides a second exposure opportunity to the information.

==== Forgetting ====
Studies have shown that information forgotten and excluded during group recall can promote the forgetting of related information compared to information unrelated to that which was excluded during group recall. Selective forgetting has been suggested to be a critical mechanism involved in the formation of collective memories and what details are ultimately included and excluded by group members. This mechanism has been studied using the socially-shared retrieval induced forgetting paradigm, a variation of the retrieval induced forgetting method with individuals. The brain has many important brain regions that are directed at memory, the cerebral cortex, the fornix and the structures that they contain. These structures in the brain are required for attaining new information, and if any of these structures are damaged you can get anterograde or retrograde amnesia (Anastasio et al., p. 26, 2012). Amnesia could be anything that disrupts your memory or affects you psychologically. Over time, memory loss becomes a natural part of amnesia. Sometimes you can get retrograde memory of a recent or past event.

=== Synchronization of memories from dyads to networks ===
Bottom-up approaches to the formation of collective memories investigate how cognitive-level phenomena allow for people to synchronize their memories following conversational remembering. Due to the malleability of human memory, talking with one another about the past results in memory changes that increase the similarity between the interactional partners' memories When these dyadic interactions occur in a social network, one can understand how large communities converge on a similar memory of the past. Research on larger interactions show that collective memory in larger social networks can emerge due to cognitive mechanisms involved in small group interactions.

== Computational approaches to collective memory analysis ==
With the ability of online data such as social media and social network data and developments in natural language processing as well as information retrieval it has become possible to study how online users refer to the past and what they focus at. In an early study in 2010 researchers extracted absolute year references from large amounts of news articles collected for queries denoting particular countries. This allowed to portray so-called memory curves that demonstrate which years are particularly strongly remembered in the context of different countries (commonly, exponential shape of memory curves with occasional peaks that relate to commemorating important past events) and how the attention to more distant years declines in news. Based on a topic modelling and analysis they then detected major topics portraying how particular years are remembered. Rather than news, Wikipedia was also the target of analysis. Viewership statistics of Wikipedia articles on aircraft crashes were analyzed to study the relation between recent events and past events, particularly for understanding memory-triggering patterns.

Other studies focused on the analysis of collective memory in social networks such as investigation of over 2 million tweets (both quantitively and qualitatively) that are related to history to uncover their characteristics and ways in which history-related content is disseminated in social networks. Hashtags, as well as tweets, can be classified into the following types:

- General History hashtags used in general to broadly identify history-related tweets that do not fall into any specific type (e.g., #history, #historyfacts).
- National or Regional History hashtags which relate to national or regional histories, for example, #ushistory or #canadianhistory including also past names of locations (e.g., #ancientgreece).
- Facet-focused History hashtags which relate to particular thematic facets of history (e.g.,#sporthistory, #arthistory).
- General Commemoration hashtags that serve for commemorating or recalling a certain day or period (often somehow related to the day of tweet posting), or unspecified entities, such as #todaywe remember, #otd, #onthisday, #4yearsago and #rememberthem.
- Historical Events hashtags related to particular events in the past (e.g., #wwi, #sevenyearswar).
- Historical Entities hashtags denoting references to specific entities such as persons, organizations or objects (e.g., #stalin, #napoleon).

The study of digital memorialization, which encompasses the ways in social and collective memory has shifted after the digital turn, has grown substantially responding to rising proliferation of memorial content not only on the internet, but also the increased use of digital formats and tools in heritage institutions, classrooms, and among individual users worldwide.

== See also ==
- Collective consciousness
- Collective intelligence
- Collective unconscious
- Cultural memory
- Culture of Remembrance
- Digital preservation, Web archiving
- Distributed cognition
- Institutional memory
- Les Lieux de Mémoire
- Memorialization
- National memory
- Oral tradition
- Oral history
- Organizational memory
- Pact of Forgetting
- Postcolonial amnesia
- Selective omission
- Spiral of silence
- Truth-seeking
