= Historical Memory Law =

Spanish law passed in 2007 dealing with the legacy of Francoism

Cortes Generales
- Long title: Law 52/2007, of 26 December, which recognizes and expands rights and establishes measures in favor of those who suffered persecution or violence during the Civil War and the Dictatorship
- Citation: BOE-A-2007-22296
- Enacted by: Congress of Deputies
- Enacted by: Senate
- Assented to by: Juan Carlos I
- Royal assent: 26 December 2007
- Effective: 28 December 2007

Legislative history

First chamber: Congress of Deputies
- Introduced by: First government of José Luis Rodríguez Zapatero
- Introduced: 28 July 2006
- Passed: 31 October 2007
- Voting summary: 184 voted for; 137 voted against; 3 abstained; 26 absent

Second chamber: Senate
- Passed: 10 December 2007
- Voting summary: 127 voted for; 119 voted against

Repealed by
- Democratic Memory Law
- Status: Repealed

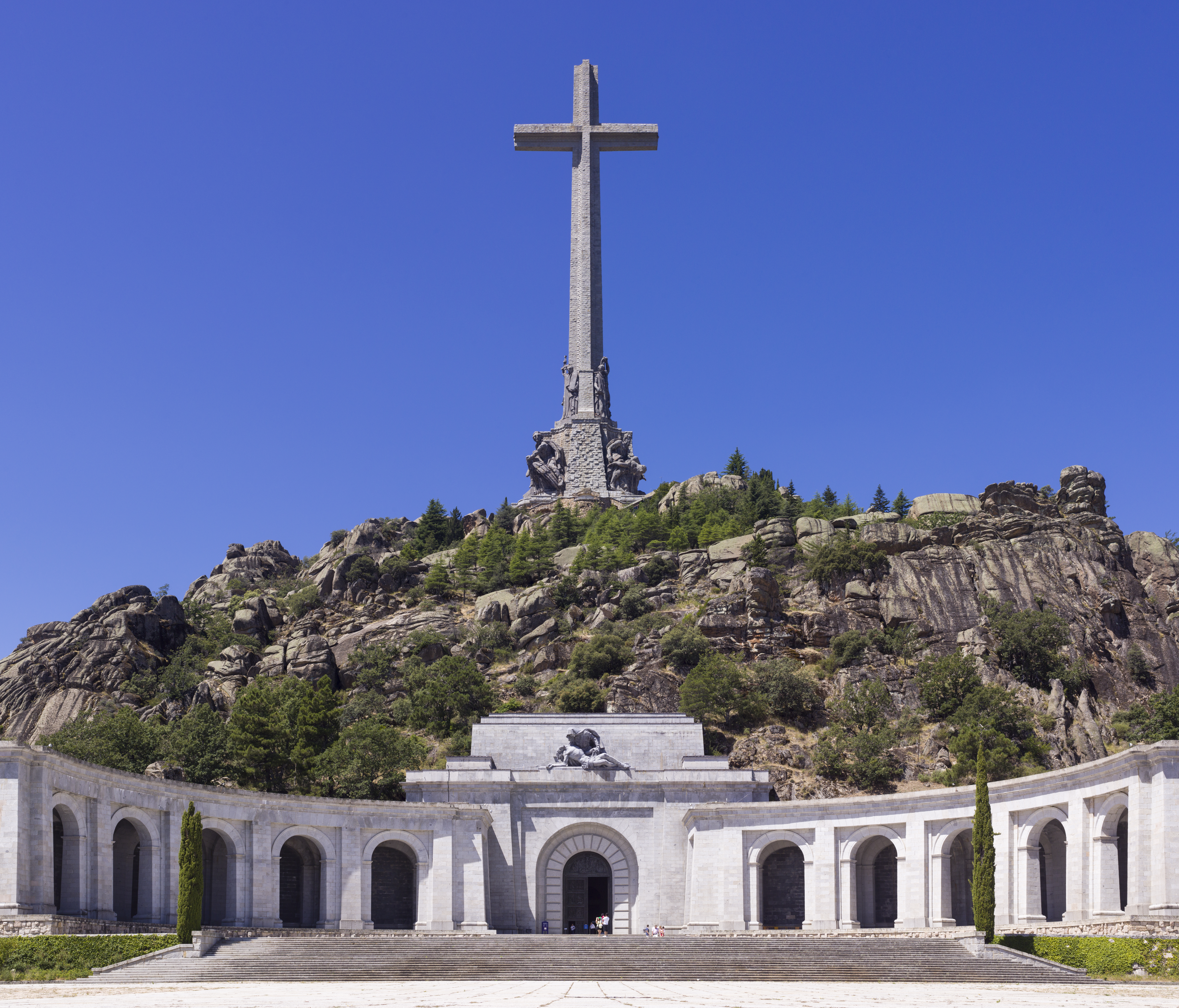
Valley of the Fallen – Franco's burial place until 2019. The law prohibits political events at the site.

Law 52/2007, commonly known as Historical Memory Law (Sp: Ley de Memoria Histórica), recognises and broadens "the rights and establishes measures in favour of those who suffered persecution or violence during the civil war and the dictatorship." (Note: in Spanish: por la que se reconocen y amplían derechos y se establecen medidas en favor de quienes padecieron persecución o violencia durante la Guerra Civil y la Dictadura.) It was passed by the Congress of Deputies on 31 October 2007, on the basis of a bill proposed by the PSOE government of Prime Minister José Luis Rodríguez Zapatero. The Historical Memory Law principally recognizes the victims on both sides of the Spanish Civil War, gives rights to the victims and the descendants of victims of the Civil War and of the subsequent dictatorship, and formally condemns the repressions of the Franco regime.

The conservative Popular Party and the Republican Left of Catalonia (ERC) both voted against the law, for opposite reasons. For its vote, the Popular Party accused the Socialist Party government of weakening the political consensus of the transition to democracy and "using the Civil War as an argument for political propaganda", while the Republican Left of Catalonia rejected the law on the basis that it did not go far enough.

== Provisions ==
The main provisions of the law are:

- Recognition of the victims of political, religious and ideological violence on both sides of the Spanish Civil War and of Franco's State.
- Condemnation of the Francoist State
- Prohibition of political events at the Valley of the Fallen – Franco's burial place.
- The removal of objects which exalt the July 1936 coup, civil war and Francoist repression from public buildings and spaces. Exceptions may be given for artistic or architectural reasons, or in the case of religious spaces.
- State help in the tracing, identification and eventual exhumation of victims of Francoist repression whose corpses are still missing, often buried in mass graves.
- The granting of Spanish nationality to surviving members of the International Brigades, without requiring them to renounce their own nationalities.
- Rejection of the legitimacy of laws passed and trials conducted by the Francoist State.
- Temporary change to Spanish nationality law, granting the right of return and de origen citizenship to those who left Spain under Franco for political or economic reasons, and their descendants.
- Provision of aid to the victims and descendants of victims of the Civil War and the Francoist State.

== Criticism ==
Criticism of the law has come from two sides, those who think that the law is not effective enough and those who support the Pact of Forgetting. Doubt has been expressed about how effective the law is as a means of obtaining retroactive justice. Republican Left of Catalonia (ERC), the left wing and Catalan nationalist party, opposed the law for not overturning verdicts reached by judges in political trials conducted in Francoist Spain, although the new legislation did declare these trials illegitimate.

Another example of the limits placed on judicial activity is what happened in 2008 when Judge Baltasar Garzón opened a national investigation into Franco and his allies. He dropped the investigation the same year after state prosecutors questioned his jurisdiction over Francoist crimes. In a 152-page statement, he passed responsibility to regional courts for opening 19 mass graves believed to hold the remains of hundreds of victims. Subsequently, a Spanish court upheld the 1977 Amnesty Law, declaring that Garzón had opened the investigation without proper authority.

Members of the conservative Popular Party have tended to support the Amnesty Law. The Amnesty Law is used as the basis of arguments that the Historical Memory Law goes against the spirit of Spain's transition to democracy. For example, the leader of the Popular Party Mariano Rajoy claimed while in opposition that Garzón's attempt to compile a list of victims would needlessly open up old wounds. However, the Popular Party did offer support for some elements of the Historical Memory Law, including seven amendments to the original text of the law, facilitating the "depoliticisation" of the Valle de los Caídos (Valley of the Fallen) and monetary aid to victims of the Civil War and Franco regime.

== Implementation of the Law ==
The conservative Popular Party government of Mariano Rajoy, which was in power from 2011 until 2018, neither repealed nor amended the Historical Memory Law but largely ignored it. The Centro Documental de la Memoria Histórica provided information on victims of Francoist repression, but the government curtailed State help in the exhumation of victims.

In 2020, the government of Pedro Sanchez resumed financial support to victim associations for exhumations.

== New law ==
In 2020, El Pais reported that the Pedro Sánchez administration was working on the draft of a new historical memory law that would include a DNA database and an official list of Civil War victims. This new law, enacted in 2022, would come to be known as the Democratic Memory Law.

The Democratic Memory Law included provisions for the following:

- Education for students regarding the dictatorship
- Nullification of military rebellion convictions from 1936 to 1938
- Creation of a registry for victims of the dictatorship who were buried in unmarked graves
- Abolition of titles of nobility that were created by the dictatorship
- Spanish citizenship being offered to descendants of Spanish exiles who were born before 1985

== Removal of statues ==
In February 2021, the last statue of Francisco Franco in Spain was removed in Melilla.

== See also ==
- Democratic Memory Law
- Damnatio memoriae
- Denazification
- De-Stalinization
- Decommunization
- General Archive of the Spanish Civil War
- Revisionism (Spain)
- Ascención Mendieta
