= Selective omission =

Memory bias (deliberate forgetting)

Selective omission is a memory bias.

In collective memory, it is a bias where a group (state, media, public opinion) makes efforts to forget and not re-introduce traumatic or unwanted memories.

This expression is often used for post-war rewriting of history in a more coherent way according to local stereotypes and moral values, which may include denying war atrocities.

The viewer may forget their own side's atrocities or suggest they were done by the opposite side, while the other side's atrocities are freely exposed. On the winning side, it is closely related to the concept of fair quest and just war, which claim to kill only warriors in fights.

When remembering things from one's past, it is easier to remember events that are tied to a major life-changing event (e.g. flashbulb memories. Research done by Norman Brown, Peter Lee, and others, tested the hypothesis that memory is organized based on life-changing events by having participants recall memories with historically defined autobiographical periods (H-DAPs; i.e. "during the war", "after the earthquake"). The results found that participants that lived in war zones or places where a natural disaster such as a tsunami had occurred typically would refer to their H-DAPs to date personal events, while New Yorkers almost never mentioned the attacks of 9/11. The researchers believed this was happening because even though they remembered the attacks of 9/11, they had very little direct effect on their everyday lives. They concluded that people use historical events to date their memories; however, what events they use and how they choose to use them remains to be determined.

== See also ==
- Motivated forgetting – Psychological defense mechanism
- Pact of Forgetting – Political decision in Spain to intentionally ignore the political legacy of Franco
- Politics of memory – Political influence on collective memory
- Colonial amnesia – Concept in postcolonial studies (the phenomenon of forgetting colonial history or remembering it in certain ways that erase the history of the colonized people).
- Truth-seeking – restorative justice
- Holocaust denial – Denial of the genocide of Jews in World War II
- Japanese history textbook controversies – Controversy over historiography in Japan
  - Nanking Massacre denial – Denial of the 1937 massacre by Japan

== Sources ==
- Pennebaker, James W.; Páez, Darío; Rimé, Bernard (1997). Collective memory of political events: social psychological perspectives. Routledge. p. 303. ISBN 978-0-8058-2182-6.
- Brown, N., Lee, P., Krslak, M., Conrad, F., Hansen, T., Havelka, J., and Reddon, R., (2009). Living in History: How War, Terrorism, and Natural Disaster Affect the Organization of Autobiographical Memory. Psychological Science. 20: 399-405. DOI: 10.1111/j.1467-9280.2009.02307.x
