= The Memory Hole (website) =

Web archive

The Memory Hole was a website edited by the late Russ Kick; it was launched on July 10, 2002, with its last post on May 11, 2009, with a successor website appearing in June 2016. Before being hacked in June 2009, the site was devoted to preserving and publishing material that is in danger of being lost, hard to find, or not widely known. Topics include government files, corporate memos, court documents, police reports and eyewitness statements, Congressional testimony, reports from various sources, maps, patents, web pages, photographs, video, sound recordings, news articles, and books. The name is a tribute to the "memory hole" from George Orwell's novel Nineteen Eighty-Four, a slot into which government officials deposit politically inconvenient documents and records for destruction.

One of the most noticeable actions was the publication of several hundred photos depicting the coffins of U.S. soldiers fallen in Iraq. These were obtained by Kick by filing a request based on the Freedom of Information Act. The photos sparked a controversy regarding the publication of war photos, public opinion and the behavior of the U.S. government.

The website is the 2005 winner of the Project on Government Oversight's "Beyond the Headlines" Award.

A successor website, The Memory Hole 2, was launched by Kick on June 16, 2016, and was maintained until January 17, 2018. As of March 2025, articles were still viewable in chronological order, but the site lacked a search function.

== See also ==
- WikiLeaks
- Cryptome
