= Good old days =

Era considered better than the present

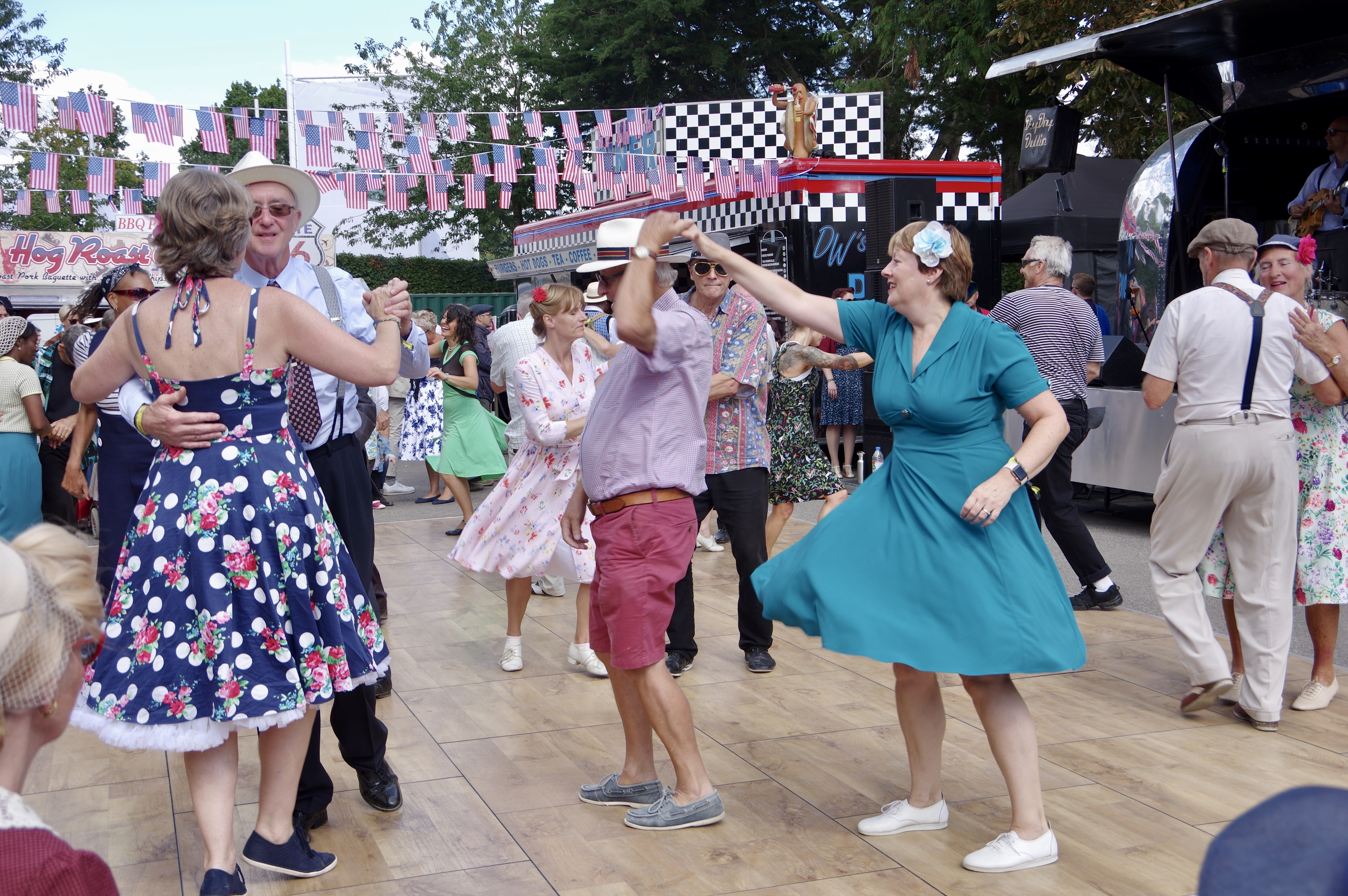
Goodwood Revival festival

Good old days – commonly stylized as "good ol' days" – is a cliché in popular culture used to reference a time considered by the speaker to be better than the current era. It is a form of nostalgia that can reflect homesickness or yearning for long-gone moments.

There is a predisposition, caused by cognitive biases such as rosy retrospection, a form of survivorship bias, for people to view the past more favourably and the future more negatively.

== Notable uses ==
=== In literature ===
In Ecclesiastes 7:10 of the Hebrew Bible, the belief in a better, past age is criticized. In the New International Version translation, it reads, "Do not say, 'Why were the old days better than these?' For it is not wise to ask such questions."

In 1726, John Henley used this phrase in his book The Primitive Liturgy: "to all honest Admirers of the good old Days of their best and wisest Fore-fathers, this first Part of the Primitive Liturgy Is most humbly dedicated".

In 1727, Daniel Defoe wrote in The Complete English Tradesman: "In the good old days of Trade, which our Fore-fathers plodded on in." In this part of his book, Defoe talks about how in 'the good old days' tradesmen were better off than in Defoe's time.

=== In music ===
In 2015, musical duo Twenty One Pilots released "Stressed Out", a song that pinpointed the return to the 'good old days'. It won the Grammy for Best Pop Duo/Group Performance in February 2017. As of August 2025, the official music video on YouTube has been viewed 3.1 billion times.

In 2017, American rapper Macklemore released his song "Good Old Days", featuring American singer-songwriter Kesha.

In 2022, The Reklaws released the studio album Good Ol' Days.

Popular Bluegrass music songs such as "Blue Railroad Train" and "Blue Ridge Cabin Home" use phrases like 'good old days' and 'days gone by' to evoke nostalgic ideas of the past.

In his 1983 song "Keeping the Faith", Billy Joel appears to subtly caution against this view, reminding the listener that "[T]he good ol' days weren't always good/And tomorrow ain't as bad as it seems".

== See also ==
- Chronological snobbery
- Golden age (metaphor)
- Nostalgia
  - Communist nostalgia
    - Ostalgie
  - Southern nostalgia
  - Sociological Francoism
- Whig history
- Cultural bereavement
