= Rosy retrospection =

Disproportionate favor towards the past

Rosy retrospection is a proposed psychological phenomenon of recalling the past more positively than it was actually experienced. The highly unreliable nature of human memory is well documented and accepted amongst psychologists. Some research suggests a 'blue retrospective' which also exaggerates negative emotions, creating a bipolar distortion of affective memory that depends on personality, time, and developmental stage.

Though it is a cognitive bias which distorts one's view of reality, it is suggested that rosy retrospection serves a useful purpose in increasing self-esteem and sense of well-being. Simplifications and exaggerations of memories that occur in rosy retrospection may make it easier for the brain to store long-term memories, as removing details may reduce the burden of those memories by requiring the generation and maintenance of fewer neural connections. In evolutionary terms, such bias may have persisted because it encourages repeated engagement in adaptive behaviors, such as social bonding, exploration, and caregiving, even when those experiences were mixed or mildly unpleasant at the time. This cognitive efficiency allows the brain to preserve core meaningful experiences without being overwhelmed by trivial or distressing details.

Rosy retrospection is closely related to nostalgia, but differs in that it specifically involves perceiving the past as better than the present. Declinism, the predisposition to view the past more favourably and the future more negatively, may be related to cognitive biases like rosy retrospection. Nostalgia is usually a sentimental longing for personal or cultural pasts; rosy retrospection functions as a more general evaluative distortion that can apply to mundane daily events as well as significant life experiences. Together, these biases can shape collective cultural narratives, leading societies to idealize historical eras as “golden ages” despite evidence of hardship and inequality.

The English idiom "rose-colored glasses" or "rose-tinted glasses" refers to perceiving something more positively than it is in reality, with similar turns of phrase in other languages. The Romans occasionally referred to this phenomenon as memoria praeteritorum bonorum, which translates into English roughly as "memory of good past", or more idiomatically as "good old days". Cross-cultural studies indicate that this cognitive tendency exists worldwide, though the specific events and time periods targeted by rosy retrospection vary based on cultural values, historical events, and social norms.

== Research ==
In one group of experiments, three groups going on different vacations were interviewed before, during, and after their vacations. Most followed the pattern of initially positive anticipation, followed by mild disappointment thereafter. Generally, most subjects reviewed the events more favorably some time after the events had occurred than they did while experiencing them. Even for vacations with record of hardship – flight delays, inclement weather or an inadequate quality of accommodations – this pattern persisted, suggesting negatively related peripheral details tend to fade more rapidly than positively associated core experiences.

A 2003 pair of studies tracked 68 and 117 undergraduates, suggesting rosy retrospection is caused by high self-esteem. Participants journaled the day's events and associated emotions each night for seven nights. They later recalled their emotions when asked about said events. Those with higher self-esteem recalled their positive emotions being stronger than they journaled. They did not also recall their negative emotions more strongly. However, this result varied in its strength and did not occur consistently. It is proposed that this bias is more acute in others with (often-secure) attachment styles whose past social encounters are more positive.

A 1995 study tracked 30 employed adults over 2 working weeks, having them report their mood every 2 hours during their waking day, as well as end-of-day and end-of-week reflection. It suggests a rosy bias which grows with time. For positive emotions, it found that end-of-day reflections were stronger than an average of the 2-hourly ratings of that day; likewise end-of-week reflections were stronger than an average of the end-of-days. But for negative emotions, there was no such significant difference neither between the averaged hourly and daily ratings nor the averaged daily and weekly ratings. This temporal gradient implies that positive affective memories are selectively reinforced during the consolidation of memory over days and weeks.

=== Exaggeration of both negative and positive emotions ===
Some studies have found evidence of a bias to exaggerating negative emotions - a.k.a. a 'blue' retrospective - as well as positive ones. These results run counter to the assumption that memory distortion is universally positive and suggest that it is flexible and that memory distortion is a response to individual differences and circumstances.

A 2016 study of 179 adults tracked their emotional state at regular intervals over 10 days, upon reflection after one day, and again after 1-2 months. It found that for both positive and negative emotions, stronger peak emotions (the strongest rating of the day) were more likely to result in exaggerated recollections upon reflection. Unlike the study above, it did not find that this effect increased with time. It also found a negative correlation with the average rating and the exaggerated recollections; suggesting those who consistently experienced stronger emotion recall more accurately. Additionally, it found extraverted personalities were more likely to have ‘rosy’ positive bias whereas neurotic personalities were more likely to have negative 'blue' bias on recall. This coincides with wider personality studies suggesting that extraversion facilitates positive emotional processing, and neuroticism increases sensitivity towards negative stimuli.

A 2021 work studied a group of 120 Swiss children aged about 12, later repeating the study on the same group aged about 15. For a week, the children filled in short emotional questionnaires at random points during their school day. Afterwards, they were asked to recall their week’s emotions in retrospect. Note they were asked only about the preceding week: the 15-year-olds were not asked to recall their emotions at age 12. It found evidence of a ‘rosy’ positive bias for the 12-year-olds. But this was the opposite for the 15-year-olds, who showed a 'blue' negative bias instead. This developmental transition is also consistent with changes in emotion regulation, social comparison, and self-identity formation that go hand in hand with puberty.

A 2003 study surveyed 41 participants around the time of their vacations. Subjects predicted their emotions before vacating, reported their emotions during (in-situ), and recalled their emotions after. It indeed found a rosy effect as subjects recalled (and predicted) their positive emotions being stronger than they actually were. But it also found recollections of negative emotions were recalled and predicted more intensely than was reported at the time (as an aside, the only significant predictor of a desire to repeat a holiday was the recalled emotions, but not the predicted nor in-situ reports). This suggests that both rosy and blue retrospection are essential in informing future behavioral choices and decisions.

=== Neural and cognitive mechanisms ===
Recent neuroscientific research is starting to uncover brain systems contributing to the rosy retrospection. The hippocampus — which is vital to producing memories — partners with the amygdala, which handles emotional salience, to give primacy to positive memories in consolidation. The medial prefrontal cortex, the part of the brain responsible for self-referential thinking, further amplifies this awareness, integrating positive memories with existing thoughts in the present self. Brain imaging fMRI studies reveal the areas related to critical analysis are downactive and reward-related areas upactive during rosy retrospection.

Cognitively, rosy retrospection depends on two central processes, selective encoding and selective reconstruction. If nothing else, people are good at encoding experiences. At retrieval they replace missing or misleading information in the past with positive assumptions. Schema theory supports this process, as existing positive self-schemas mediate memory retrieval processes to maintain coherence with the self-image.Conner, Tamlin (2003). Remembering Everyday Experience Through the Prism of Self-Esteem. Personality and Social Psychology Bulletin. 29(1): 51–62. Slowly, these reconstructed memories become part of the life narrative and shape identity and expectations about the future.

=== Real-world applications ===
Rosy retrospection is having serious practical benefits in many aspects of daily life. In consumer behavior, people judge past buying, travel and leisure experiences (travel, hobbies etc.) more positively over time, making them to be fond of repeat purchases even in the context of mixed in-the-moment experiences.[13] This bias is often exploited by marketers, through nostalgic branding and drawing on past associations with positive associations, to establish loyalty.

In the field of mental health, understanding rosy retrospection allows clinicians to take a more positive approach to mood and anxiety disorders. People with depression frequently engage in excessive blue retrospection, and with interventions that can facilitate client awareness of and counterbalancing this retrospection process for clients through the recognition of positive, past experiences, clients with depression are more likely to benefit from this type of intervention. By encouraging partners to engage in rosy retrospective memory of shared history, couples can lower the effect of past conflicts on relationship satisfaction.

In educational settings, guided reflection on previous academic achievements may help students develop resilience and motivation. Recalling experiences of overcoming learning difficulties may also influence how students approach subsequent academic challenges. However, the relationship between positive recollections, perseverance, and the development of a growth mindset requires supporting evidence.

In workplace settings, reflecting on previous challenges may contribute to how employees and managers interpret professional experiences. Viewing past difficulties as opportunities for learning may influence attitudes toward future challenges, although claims about improvements in organisational well-being or productivity require additional evidence.

=== Limitations ===
Relying on subjective ratings, the above studies could suffer from demand characteristics: participants may guess the study's goals and expected results, unconsciously changing their answers thinking they are 'supposed' to recall their emotions inaccurately. Experiments may lack ecological validity.

These studies may be vulnerable to sample biases. They rely on small samples which are more likely to be unrepresentative of the general population by unlucky chance. Many of the samples are homogenous to varying extents, with subjects often being relatively young, in education, and western. A similar sample bias may occur in the way researchers find subjects. Potentially those who come across and are appealed to join and remain in studies will be those with relatively more free-time, better education, higher wealth and income, etc. Though the studies took varying efforts to reduce this by ensuring a balance of ages, ethnicities, sexes, etc. While the studies attempted to balance it on different levels (age, ethnic group, sex, etc.), it is less researched cross-culturally or by socioeconomic stratification.

These studies typically asked subjects to recall their emotions only days or weeks after an event. Thus they may predict little for rosy retrospection on the scale of months, years, and decades. Longitudinal follow-up studies of memory distortion over years or decades are infrequent and are necessary to decipher lifelong trends of rosy and blue retrospection.

A suggested cause of such findings may be in the social and linguistic norms of the subjects, rather than their actual emotions. Especially if a subject fails to fully recall their emotions, social convention may bias them to more positive terms in an attempt to answer. Though this raises the question as to if evidence exists or can be found of such a norm and bias.

Most of the previous research has been on mild, everyday events. Little is currently known about the workings of rosy retrospection when in the domain of trauma, the effects of grief, or highly negative life events, wherein memory processes may have different trajectories.

== See also ==
- Anemoia – Form of nostalgia
- Confabulation – Recall of fabricated, misinterpreted or distorted memories
- Declinism – Belief that something is tending towards decline
- Emotion and memory – Critical factors contributing to the emotional enhancement effect on human memory
- End-of-history illusion – Psychological illusion about the future
- Golden Age – Term denoting a period of primordial peace, harmony, stability, and prosperity
- Hindsight bias – Type of confirmation bias
- List of cognitive biases
- Optimism bias – Type of cognitive bias
- Pollyanna principle – Tendency to remember pleasant things better
- Positivity effect
- Reference class forecasting – Method of predicting the future
