= Colonial amnesia =

Concept in postcolonial studies

Colonial amnesia (also known as postcolonial amnesia or imperialist amnesia) is a concept in postcolonial studies describing the phenomenon of forgetting colonial history or remembering it in certain ways that erase the history of the colonized people. Colonial amnesia may also manifest by romanticizing the colonial past or feeling nostalgia for it.

== Examples ==
=== Germany ===
According to anti-colonial activists, the German colonial past was long erased within Germany. However, Germany has begun to address aspects of its colonial legacy in Namibia, Cameroon, Togo, Rwanda and Burundi. The anti-colonial German historian Paul Grosse has claimed that the enormity of the German reckoning with the Holocaust had once "overshadowed" the colonial atrocities in German colonies, but that Germans were increasingly aware of German colonial history.

=== Nordic countries ===
Critics of the history of Nordic colonialism have highlighted what they view as the colonial amnesia of Norwegian, Swedish, Danish, and Finnish people. According to the Danish sociologist Mette Evelyn Bjerre, "colonial amnesia is strong in the Nordic countries" and many Nordic people believe they were "mere bystanders to European colonialism and slavery and therefore do not have a racialized view of the world." Bjerre describes this notion as a fallacy.

=== United States ===
Dean Itsuji Saranillio, a Filipino-American academic from Hawaii, has criticized the colonial amnesia of the "Filipino settler" community in relation to Native Hawaiians.

=== Palestine and Israel ===
The Israeli Arab-Jewish writer Ariella Azoulay has characterized the Boycott, Divestment and Sanctions movement as part of the Palestinian struggle against the "structural colonial amnesia" of the Israeli state and the Zionist movement.

== See also ==
- Amnesia
- Cognitive dissonance
- Colonialism
- Good German
- Italiani brava gente
- Politics of memory
- Settler colonialism
- Social amnesia
- Vergangenheitsbewältigung
- White defensiveness
