= The Vichy Syndrome =

1987 book by Henry Rousso

The Vichy Syndrome (Le syndrome de Vichy) is a 1987 book by Henry Rousso. The term Vichy syndrome is used by Rousso to describe the collective guilt, shame, and denial that many French people felt in the aftermath of the Second World War, especially in the 1970s and beyond, and particularly with regard to the collaborationist Vichy government. The Vichy regime's complicity in the persecution of Jews and other minorities has been a source of shame and controversy in France ever since.

== Background ==
Charles de Gaulle wrote his War Memoirs (Mémoires de guerre) about the liberation of France in his years out of power, from his resignation from the Provisional Government in 1946 to his reaccession to power as head of the Fifth Republic in 1958. In his memoirs, he was able to lay out his view of the history of the struggle for the liberation of France, presenting himself as a defender of traditional French values, and as a patriot fighting for the grandeur of his country, and expresses his national pride and his view of a special, god-given, glorious destiny for his country. His opening words of having a "certain idea of France" have become famous as a synopsis of the Gaullist view of France.

A false narrative of exaggerated importance of the Resistance in the liberation created the founding myth of post-Vichy France, and it closely intertwined with the question on how France should face the history to recognize its stake in the Holocaust and how this period should be viewed in the national memory.

== Terminology ==
Henry Rousso coined the term Vichy syndrome in his 1987 book Le syndrome de Vichy 1944–1987 published in France in 1987. In the book, he also coined a phrase to describe the era (un passé qui ne passe pas, 'A past that doesn't pass'), picked up as the title of his 1994 book with Eric Conan by that name, and translated into English by Nathan Bracher as "an ever-present past".

Another neologism from the book is French: résistancialisme, lit. 'resistance-ism') to describe exaggerated historical memory of the French Resistance during World War II. In particular, French: résistancialisme refers to exaggerated beliefs about the size and importance of the resistance and anti-German sentiment in German-occupied France in post-war French thinking. Rousso argued that résistancialisme rose among Gaullists and communists soon after the war and became mainstream during the Algerian War. In particular, it was used to describe the belief that resistance was both unanimous and natural during the period, and justify the lack of historiographical interest in the role of French collaboration and the Vichy government.

The term négationnisme ('Holocaust denial') was first coined in the 1987 book. Rousso posited that it was necessary to distinguish between legitimate historical revisionism in Holocaust studies and politically motivated denial of the Holocaust, which he termed negationism.

== Definition ==
In Rousso's conception, the Vichy syndrome is

the complex of heterogeneous symptoms and manifestations revealing, particularly in political, cultural and social life, the existence of traumas engendered by the Occupation, especially those linked to internal divisions-traumas that have been maintained, and sometimes heightened after the events are over.

== Reception ==
The book was recognized as an "instant classic". Republished in 1990 as Le Syndrome de Vichy de 1944 à nos jours, it was labeled "magisterial". The book first appeared in English in 1991 as The Vichy Syndrome: History and Memory in France since 1944 and was immediately noted in the English literature, inspiring comment and further analysis in journals such as French Historical Studies.

== Analysis ==
Rousso stated that France was suffering from an "illness due to its past". He described four stages in the evolution of the syndrome in terms that have echoes in psychoanalytic discourse, speaking of the first stage as "unresolved grief" (deuil inachevé) due to the pressing post-war objectives of consolidating the military victory and rebuilding the country which left no room for introspection about the massive internal power struggles which were in fact a more powerful factor roiling France than even the Nazi occupation. Stage two, "repression" (réfoulement) occurred during the economic boom years of 1954 to 1971, consisting of the casting into oblivion any memory of the hardships but also of the ideological divisions, and class- and race-based hatred that were institutionalized during Vichy. This view was epitomized by de Gaulle's War Memoirs, where he professed his "certain idea of France" based on his traditionalist, patriotic values.

In stage three, which Rousso labeled the "broken mirror", the "certain idea of France" was eroded by the events of May 68, a cultural ticking time bomb, which eventually flattened the guardrails of memory carefully constructed by de Gaulle with the help of his leftist opposition. The erosion continued with the release of the 1969 documentary The Sorrow and the Pity about the collaboration between the Vichy government and Nazi Germany, and the bombshell finally exploded (Note: "Bombshell exploded": In the words of French historian Gérard Noiriel, the book "had the effect of a bombshell, because it showed, with supporting evidence, that the French state had participated in the deportation of Jews to the Nazi concentration camps, a fact that had been concealed by historians until then.") with the historiographical revolution brought about by the release in France of La France de Vichy by Robert Paxton, which crushed previous views of Vichy, typified by that of Robert Aron, under an avalanche of evidence, precipitating intense and acrimonious debate in France. This brief phase only lasted a few years, until 1974, when the next phase, which Rousso called "obsession", began, characterized by a "return to repression". Bit by bit, the taboos began to fall, and parts of the real story leaked out, including, finally, a broadcast of "The Sorrow and the Pity" in the 1980s for the first time. Antics of far-right politicians such as Jean-Marie le Pen kept traditionalist views before the public, and some well-publicized war crimes trials, such as those of Klaus Barbie, René Bousquet, and Paul Touvier kept the "black years" of Vichy in the public eye throughout the 1980s and into the 1990s.

Historian Pierre Nora views Rousso as a not atypical member of the post-war generation, schooled on views like those of Robert Aron whose history of France under Vichy described Vichy France as a nation of people fully supportive of the Resistance with the exception of a few traitorous exceptions. But this was also the generation heavily influenced by events of May 1968, tending left, and then shaken by the Paxtonian revolution of the early 1970s. Rousso's reaction, in Nora's view, was that Rousso flipped the script and viewed France under Vichy as generally collaborationist, with the exception of a few heroes.

== Debate ==
Responding to Bertram Gordon's piece in French historical studies, Rousso emphasized that looking for definitions of the "Vichy syndrome" in certain catalogs or indexes of historical works is to look where the evidence isn't, or at least wasn't in 1987, because the "syndrome", if there was one, was evidenced in the public and cultural debate, in the production of films, in the actions of the courts, well before this was reflected in the output of historians or especially in printed books which might be indexed. In this regard, Rousso views historians as just one "vector of memory" among others, and often arrive in last place, after the cineastes, writers, or activists.

== See also ==
- Memory work
- Myth of the clean Wehrmacht – the negationist notion that regular German armed forces were not involved in the Holocaust or other war crimes during World War II.

== Works cited ==
- Bracher, Nathan (1993). "Le Syndrome de Vichy de 1944 à nos jours by Henry Rousso (review)". L'Esprit Créateur (in French). 33 (1). JHU Press. doi:10.1353/esp.1993.0054. OCLC 7079175074 – via TWL/Project MUSE.
- Bracke, Maud Anne (1 January 2011). Anderson, Peter; Evangelisti, Silvia; Favretto, Ilaria; Dillon, Amanda (eds.). "From Politics to Nostalgia: The Transformation of War Memories in France during the 1960s–1970s" (PDF). European History Quarterly. 41 (1). SAGE Journals (SAGE Publishing): 5–24. doi:10.1177/0265691410386423. ISSN 0265-6914. OCLC 123479187. S2CID 144900151. Archived from the original (PDF) on 19 July 2018.
- Conan, Eric; Rousso, Henry (1998). Vichy: An Ever-present Past. UPNE. pp. 38–. ISBN 978-0-87451-795-8. OCLC 1137403989.
- Coutau-Bégarie, Hervé (1988). "Henry Rousso. Le syndrome de Vichy (1944-1987)". Politique étrangère (in French). 53 (3): 784.
- Finkielkraut, Alain (1998). The Future of a Negation: Reflections on the Question of Genocide. Lincoln: University of Nebraska Press. ISBN 978-0-8032-2000-3.
- Golsan, Richard (2001). "History and the "Duty to Memory" in Postwar France". In Marchitello, Howard (ed.). What Happens to History: The Renewal of Ethics in Contemporary Thought. Psychology Press. pp. 38–. ISBN 978-0-415-92562-4.
- Gordon, Bertram M (1995). "The 'Vichy Syndrome' Problem in History". French Historical Studies. 19 (2). Duke University Press, Society for French Historical Studies: 495–518. doi:10.2307/286785. ISSN 0016-1071. JSTOR 286785 – via JSTOR.
- Nora, Pierre (1995). "Le Syndrome, son passé, son avenir" [The Syndrome, its past, its future]. French Historical Studies (in French). 19 (2). Duke University Press: 487–493. doi:10.2307/286784. JSTOR 286784.
- Noiriel, Gérard [in French] (19 November 2019) [1st pub. 2018:Agone]. Une histoire populaire de la France : De la guerre de Cent Ans à nos jours [A Popular History of France: from the 100 Years War to the Present Day]. Mémoires sociales (in French). Agone. p. 547. ISBN 978-2-7489-0301-0. OCLC 1057326362. "[Le livre] fit l'effet d'une bombe, car il montrait, preuves à l'appui, que l'État français avait participé à la déportation des Juifs dans les camps de concentration nazis, ce qui avait été occulté par les historiens jusque-là." [[The book] was a bombshell, because it showed, with evidence, that the French state had participated in the deportation of Jews to the Nazi concentration camps, which had been concealed by historians until then.]
- Quirion, Lise (1 April 1997). Savard, Stéphane; Carel, Ivan; Bernier, Emmanuel (eds.). "Henry Rousso, Le syndrome de Vichy, de 1944 à nos jours, Paris, Seuil, 1990, 414 p." Bulletin d'histoire politique (in French). 5 (3). Montreal: 145–150 Association Québécoise d'Histoire Politique/VLB Éditeur. doi:10.7202/1063638ar. ISSN 1201-0421. Archived from the original (PDF) on 9 February 2020.
- Reid, Donald (2002). "The Occupation, the French State, and Business (book review) - Business History Review - Donald Reid" (PDF). Business History Review. Harvard Business School. Archived from the original (PDF) on 2004-09-15.
- Rousso, Henry (1995). "Le Syndrome de l'historien" [The Historian Syndrome]. French Historical Studies (in French). 19 (2). Duke University Press: 519–526. doi:10.2307/286786. JSTOR 286786.
- Scullion, Rosemarie (1999). "Unforgettable: History, Memory, and the Vichy Syndrome". Studies in 20th Century Literature. 23 (1). New Prairie Press. doi:10.4148/2334-4415.1452.
- Stauber, Roni, ed. (13 September 2010). Collaboration with the Nazis: Public Discourse After the Holocaust. Routledge. pp. 183–. ISBN 978-1-136-97136-5.
