= Saint-Simon Foundation =

The Saint-Simon Foundation (French: Fondation Saint-Simon) was a French think tank that was created in 1982 and brought together public intellectuals, journalists, senior civil servants, business leaders, trade unionists, and academics. It terminated its activity in 1999, largely because its co-founder Pierre Rosanvallon decided to move on to other projects.

== Creation and name ==
The Saint-Simon Foundation was created in 1982 by a group of business figures and public intellectuals centered on industrialist Roger Fauroux, historian François Furet, maverick essayist Alain Minc, and sociologist Pierre Rosanvallon, with inspiration from French Resistance hero and journalist Philippe Viannay. Also involved at the creation were historians Emmanuel Le Roy Ladurie and Pierre Nora as well as civil servant and businessman Simon Nora.

Rosanvallon argued that the impulse for the foundation's creation came in the wake of the 1981 French presidential election and the victory of Socialist François Mitterrand. Its aim was to create a social exchange network that would be independent from existing political clubs and university institutions. The foundation broadly supported democracy and economic liberalism, and aimed to create bridges between Universities, business and public administration. Pierre Nora defined it as an "encounter between people who had money with people who had ideas" (« la rencontre de gens qui avaient des moyens avec des gens qui avaient des idées »).

The foundation's name intentionally maintained the ambiguity as to which of two celebrated French figures named Saint-Simon it paid tribute to: memorialist Louis de Rouvroy, duc de Saint-Simon (1675-1755), or his distant relative social theorist Henri de Saint-Simon (1760-1825). According to Minc, that idea was suggested by Le Roy Ladurie.

== Activity and criticism ==
The Saint-Simon Foundation was located in Paris at 91 bis, rue du Cherche-Midi. It published numerous memos and studies. In the 1990s, it was increasingly the target of criticism from the left, alleging an excessive and somehow covert influence on French politics. It was widely viewed as emblematic of a form of French mainstream thought, which Minc lauded as the "circle of reason" (French: cercle de la raison) and critics dismissed as the "only [admissible] thought" (French: pensée unique).

The Saint-Simon Foundation was a member of The Hague Club international network of think tanks. After it dissolved in 1999, many of its former members joined Le Siècle.

== Membership ==
- President: François Furet, then Roger Fauroux
- Secretary: Pierre Rosanvallon
- Treasurer: Alain Minc
- Other board members: Jean-Claude Casanova, Jean Peyrelevade, Yves Sabouret

In the late 1990s, the foundation's membership was slightly above a hundred, of which about 85 percent were men. In addition to the names cited above, they included:

- senior current or former civil servants: e.g. Martine Aubry, François Bloch-Lainé, Nicolas Dufourcq, Laurence Engel, Jean-Baptiste de Foucauld, Antoine Garapon, Frédéric Lavenir, Jacques Rigaud
- CEOs and businesspeople: e.g. Jean-Louis Beffa, José Bidegain, Christian Blanc, Michel Bon, Marin Karmitz, Jean-Luc Lagardère, Francis Mer, Antoine Riboud
- trade union leaders: e.g. Edmond Maire, Nicole Notat
- journalists: e.g. Jean Boissonnat, Jean Daniel, Jean-Pierre Elkabbach, Franz-Olivier Giesbert, Laurent Joffrin, Serge July, Christine Ockrent, Anne Sinclair
- academics and public intellectuals: e.g. Daniel Cohen, Luc Ferry, Jean-Paul Fitoussi, Georges Kiejman, Marie Mendras, Edgar Morin, Irène Théry, Alain Touraine

== See also ==
- Club de l'Entresol
