= Italiani brava gente =

Italian popular myth about Fascist Italy, the Holocaust, and World War II-related crimes

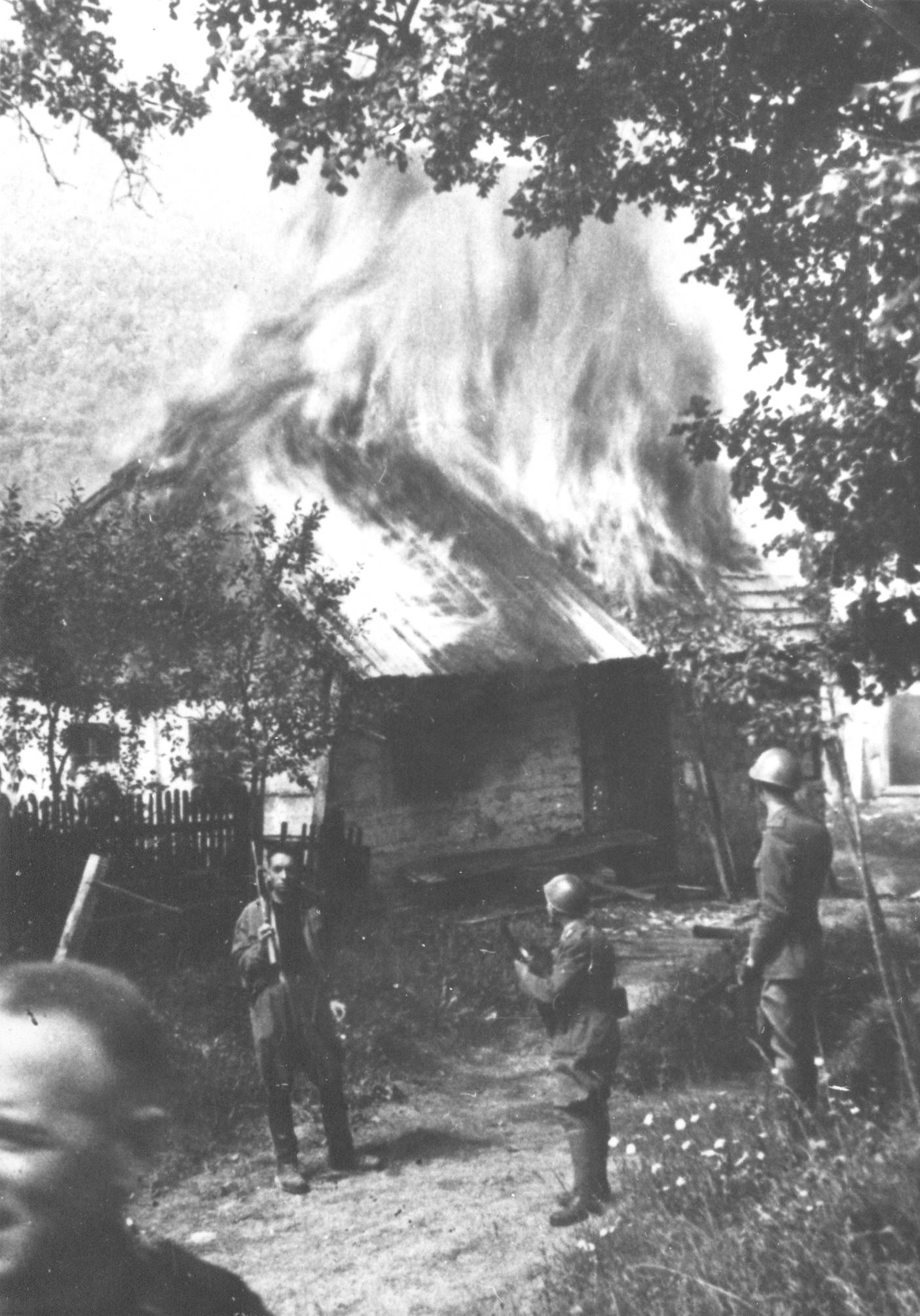
Italian troops watch the burning of a Croatian farmhouse in 1941

"Italians, the good people" (Italian: Italiani brava gente) is a phrase adopted by historians to refer to Italian popular beliefs about the allegedly limited, even non-existent, participation of Fascist Italy and the Royal Italian Army in the Holocaust and war crimes committed by Axis soldiers during World War II. The phenomenon is also known as the myth of the good Italian.

== Concept ==
A form of historical revisionism which emerged under the post-war republic, it was argued that Italian soldiers had been "good" or "decent people" (brava gente) who had acted with humanity and compassion, supposedly inherent Italian values, in contrast to their ideologically motivated and brutal German allies. In particular, it argued that the Italians had not participated in, or even had opposed, the Nazi persecution of Jews in occupied parts of Eastern Europe. It was argued that Hannah Arendt supported the myth by maintaining that Italian Jews had been protected by the "general, spontaneous humanity of a people of ancient civilization". By extension, the term is sometimes applied to describe popular beliefs about the Italo-Ethiopian War (1935–36) or non-Jewish responses to the Holocaust in Italy.

The concept is based on the benevolent characteristics of the Italian people, such as making them potentially immune from inhumanity towards the enemy in war or towards colonized nations, and capable of guaranteeing Italians special indulgence in return from other peoples. Pierluigi Battista defines it as:

A shield of good-naturedness, joviality, a natural inclination towards meekness and cordial sociability which should have protected [the Italians] from brutal hostility, a comfortable cushion capable of cushioning the dramatic impact of history and cruelty.

In contrast with Battista and others who trace the rise of the myth to the post-World War II period, Angelo Del Boca points out that its origins are older and date back to the beginning of Italian colonial expansion (1885), in which the country, the last to start it among the European powers, programmatically attempted to show itself different, more human, a bringer of civilization, strong as it was in its history. This led to the affirmation of the phrase, distorted by the Eritrean population, of bono italiano ('good Italian').

== In popular culture ==
Notable examples of the phenomenon in popular culture are the film Mediterraneo (1991) directed by Gabriele Salvatores and the novel Captain Corelli's Mandolin (1994) by Louis de Bernières which was also adapted into a film in 2001. The myth avoided "a public debate on collective responsibility, guilt and denial, repentance and pardon" but has recently been challenged by historians. The myth parallels the popular beliefs about the "Clean Wehrmacht" popular in post-war West Germany or the "victim theory" in Austria.

== See also ==
- Colonial amnesia
- Italian war crimes
- The Holocaust in Italy
- The Holocaust in Libya
- Libyan genocide
- Good German
- Myth of the clean Wehrmacht
- Austria victim theory
- Japanese history textbook controversies
- Vichy syndrome and Résistancialisme
