= Memory space =

Memory space can refer to:

- Memory space (computational resource), a computer science/information theory concept related to computational resources
- Memory space (social science), a sociological concept related to collective memory
