= Résistancialisme =

French national myth of anti-Nazi resistance

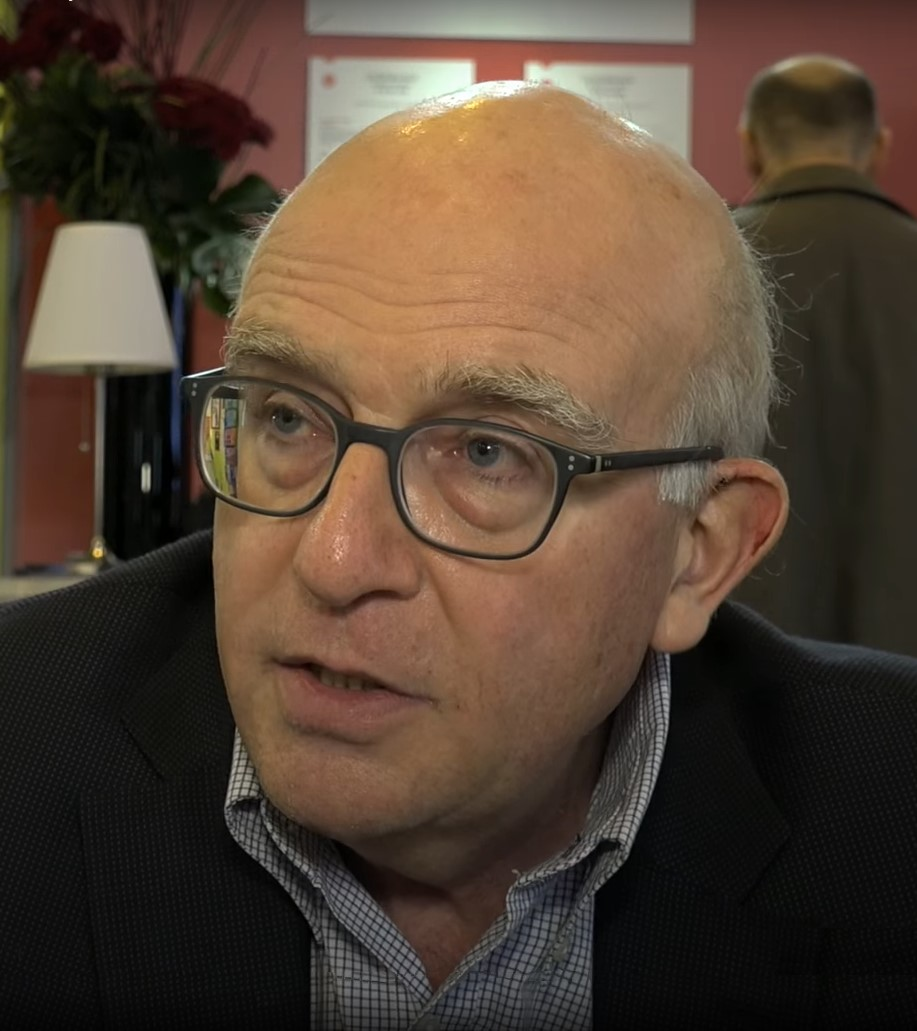
Henry Rousso, who coined the neologism, in 2016

"Résistancialisme" (French; lit. 'Resistance-ism') is a neologism coined by historian Henry Rousso to describe exaggerated historical memory of the French Resistance during World War II. In particular, résistancialisme refers to exaggerated beliefs about the size and importance of the resistance and anti-German sentiment in German-occupied France in post-war French thinking. The term was coined by Rousso in 1987. He argued that résistancialisme rose among Gaullists and Communists soon after the war and became mainstream during the Algerian War. In particular, it was used to describe the belief that resistance was both unanimous and natural during the period, and justify the lack of historiographical interest in the role of French collaboration and the Vichy government.

Rousso emphasises that résistancialisme should not be confused with "résistantialisme" (with a "t", literally "Resistor-ism"), which is a pejorative term used by Jean-Marie Desgrange to criticize individuals who retrospectively exaggerated or faked their own involvement in the wartime resistance in an attempt to enhance their own status after the war, for instance François Mitterrand. The concept of résistancialisme has gained some spread through artistic works in France, including movies, novels, television and music; in turn, popular culture has become affected by résistancialisme.

== Context ==
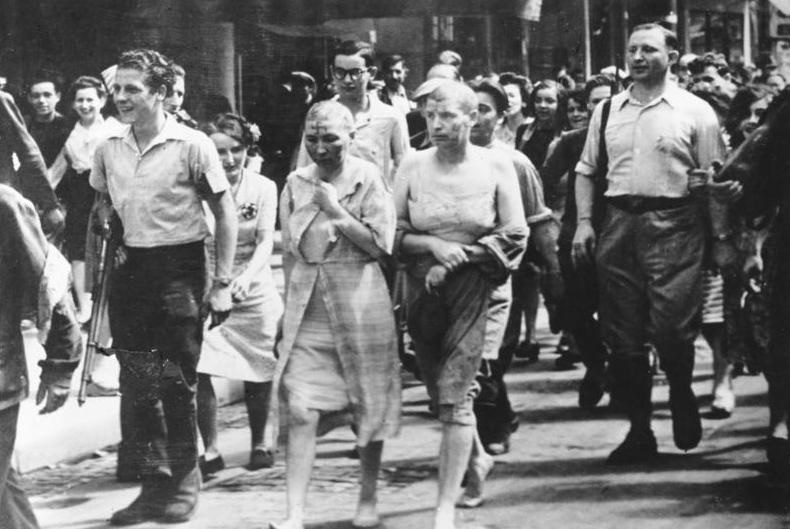
Shaved women accused of having sexual relations with German soldiers forced to parade

The challenge for the French government in the aftermath of World War II was enormous. The end of German occupation immediately created an atmosphere of confidence and hope in the future and La Resistance became associated to this renewal. However, this positive and unitary attitude did not last. Soon, French people called for tougher measures against women and men suspected of collaboration. In addition to the legal purge (French: épuration légale) conducted by the French government from 1944 to 1949, France underwent a wave of public executions and humiliations known as the wild purge (French: épuration sauvage). These purges included the execution of at least 9000 people, and the head shaving of women who had had relationships with the German enemy.

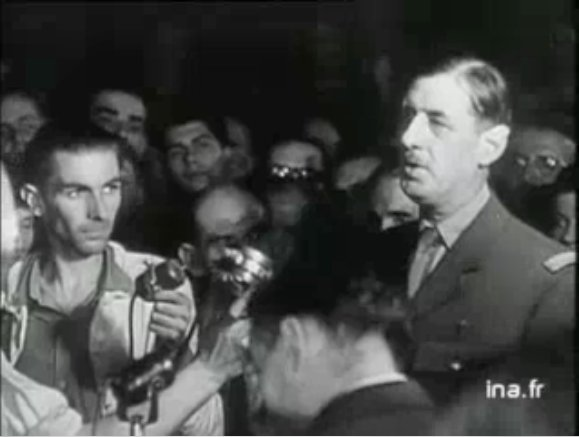
De Gaulle's Liberation of Paris speech at the Paris City Hall on the 25th of August 1944

In this period of complete disorder and confusion, different voices from the resistance emerged; the two main voices being the Gaullist and the Communist. Hence the need for France to come up with a dominant unifying narrative that would later be referred to as the resistancialist myth, or simply resistancialism. This narrative presented the Vichy Regime as a parenthesis in French history which did not question "the righteousness of the French nation".

The myth is often embodied by de Gaulle's Liberation of Paris speech, delivered at the Paris City Hall on the 25th of August 1944.

"Paris! Paris outraged! Paris broken! Paris martyred! But Paris liberated! Liberated by itself, liberated by its people with the help of the French armies, with the support and the help of all France, of the France that fights, of the only France, of the real France, of the eternal France!"

== The construction of an official memory ==
At a time when the French nation had never been so fragmented, the resistancialist myth was introduced soon after the war, in 1947, in order to counter the emerging tensions of the Cold War and face the communist memorial discourse. The collectively built memory had the purpose of, in the words of French historian Pierre Laborie, "give a reassuring vision of the dark years" in minimizing the influence of Vichy in the French society and portraying the Résistance as having much more support that it actually had.

=== A selective memory ===
All discourse not in accordance with the official memory was to be carefully monitored. Censorship intervened in numerous cases where the Occupation was depicted too dramatically. For instance, movies such as Les Honneurs de la Guerre (1962) had to be modified several times in order to be released, because the role of the Milice was deemed too important. Another example is the removal of a scene which portrayed a French policeman participating in the arrest of Jews in Alain Resnais's movie Night and Fog (1956). The censors went not only to the point of amending fictions, they actually stood to hide actual facts and depictions of reality.

When de Gaulle returned to power in 1958, he participated actively to the creation of the resistancialist myth. The memory of Résistance was sacralized and elevated as the cement of the French nation. Landmark events such as the transfer of the Jean Moulin's remains to the Panthéon are representative of such efforts. The message the government aimed to transmit was a syllogism, present in the famous discourse of Minister of Culture André Malraux at this event: if the Resistance is embodied by de Gaulle, and that de Gaulle represents France, then logically Resistance equals France.

=== The infringement in popular culture ===
This national narrative had also progressively come to shape popular culture. Cinema had been considered a useful tool both to create the myth in the aftermath of the war and to question it after 1968. The Battle of the Rails (La Bataille du rail) is 1946 a war movie by René Clément illustrating the French Resistance among railway workers which consisted in sabotaging the German rail network. This movie is one of the most famous French Résistance movie and greatly contributed to Resistancialism. A few years later, René Clément directed the historical film Is Paris Burning (1966) based on a book by Larry Collins and Dominique Lapierre. This movie depicts the liberation of Paris staged by the French Resistance and the Free French forces.

Not only did the aftermath of World War II French cinema silence the existence of collaboration to favor the myth of Resistancialism but it also buried the memory of foreign forms of resistance such as the Manouchian group.

== Conflicting memories ==
=== Communists and Gaullists ===
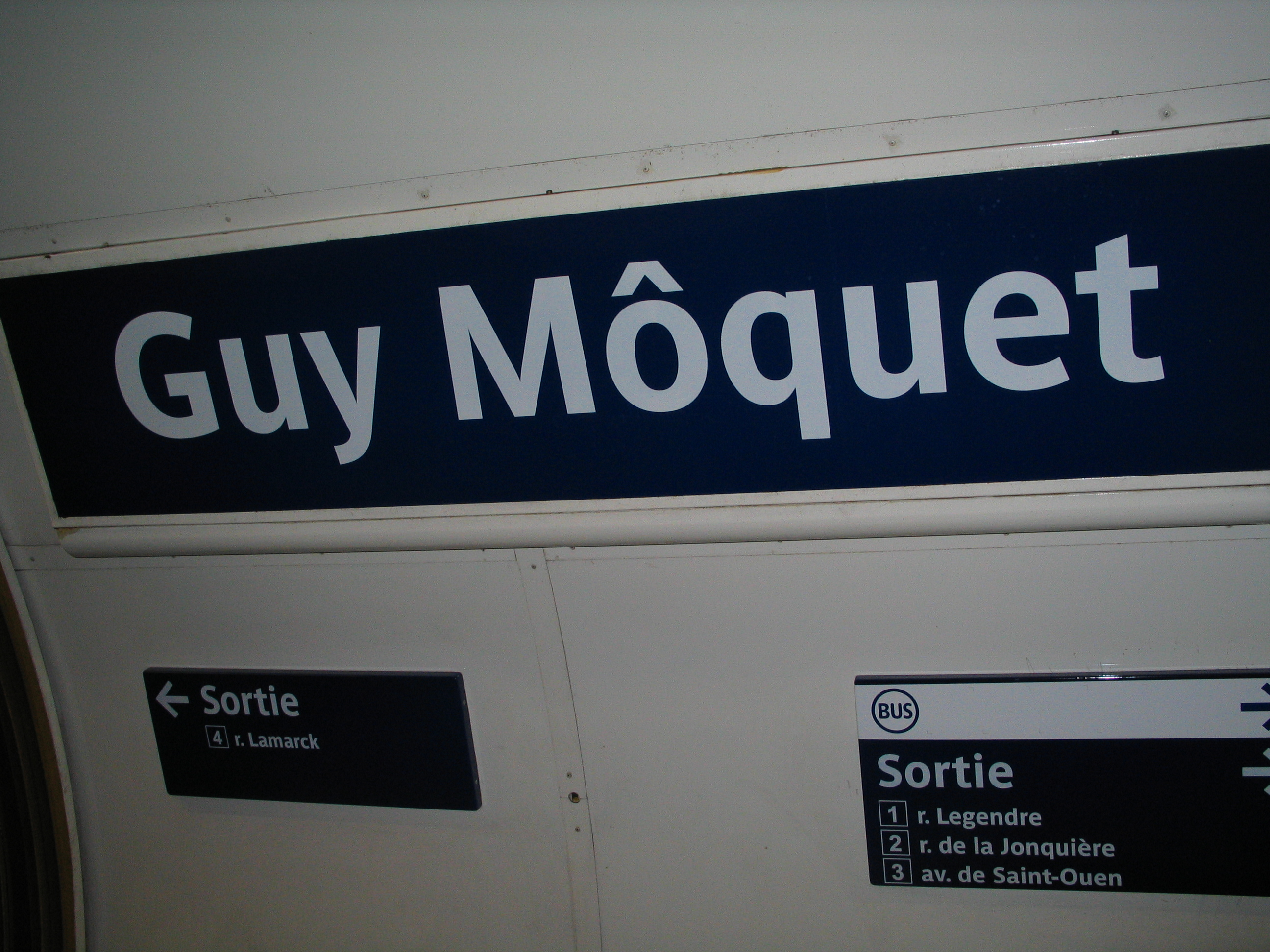
The Carrefour Marcadet metro station was renamed Guy Môquet in 1946, when the Rue Balagny was renamed in honour of a symbol of the French Resistance, Guy Môquet, who was killed at the age of seventeen.

The Communists were the quickest to present themselves as the inheritors of the Liberation. Dubbing themselves the "party of the 75,000 martyrs", whereas about 35,000 French in total, and not all communists, were executed. The communists "probably lost only a few thousand men to German firing squads", but the figure of 75 000 became an accepted truth and contributed to the legacy of the resistance remaining central to the Party's identity. Right after the Liberation, several ceremonies were held honoring fallen communists and eighteen squares and streets in Paris were almost immediately renamed after communist martyrs.

The Gaullist party was also keen to take ownership of the legacy of the resistance. The official discourse was that, apart from a few traitors, France had supported the French Résistance and France had liberated itself alone. The central power invested time and energy to make the occupation look like a dark parenthesis, insisting on the idea that the Vichy regime did not represent France. Among these efforts were for example the Ordinance of 9 August 1944, which rendered all the legislation enacted since 16 June 1940 null and void, the renaming of the avenue Maréchal Pétain to the avenue Dr Louis Mallet, who had been a French Résistant, or the refusal to proclaim the restoration of the Republic on August 24 at the Hôtel de Ville as it implied that it had for a moment ceased to exist. The goal was to separate the image of France from the one of Vichy. Traces of the construction of that myth can be found in the de Gaulle's speeches during the Liberation and at the end of the war. For instance, during his first speech on a liberated French territory on 14 June 1944, de Gaulle assured the inhabitants of Bayeux to "continue the struggle today, as you have not ceased to do since June 1940". When he returned to power as a result of the political crisis of 1958, de Gaulle reinforced the mythology of the Resistance, notably though the pantheonization ceremony of Jean Moulin.

While both factions shared differences with each other, there was consensus between both on that "the Resistance had represented the real France and incarnated the true feelings of the French people throughout the Occupation". This helped foster and spread the myth of a highly-resistant France during the Occupation period.

=== Dissenting and silenced memories ===
The myth of the resistance became so overpowering that for a long period of time, it squeezed out alternative memories of the Occupation period. Many resistants were for instance critical of the idea that a majority of the French population had taken part in the Resistance. The resistance fighter Alban Vistel expressed this frustration, stating that "it is time to unmask a pious myth which has not really deceived anyone. The great majority of the people of this country played only a small and fleeting part in the events. Their activity was passive, except at the last moments".

While traditional conservatism and the far-right in France had been discredited due to its role in the Vichy government, many rehabilitated former collaborators challenged the prevailing Resistance narrative. Rather than attacking the Resistance as a whole, they created the term "resistentialism" to criticise those who they saw as pseudo-resisters while also attempting to rehabilitate the memory of Pétain and his collaborationist government.

With the myth of the resistance requiring heroes, the memories of victims of the Nazi regime not involved in the resistance were often buried within the collective memory. This is visible in the way different groups of deportees were recognised as victims by the Government. While political and resistant deportees were recognised as victims of the Vichy and Nazi regime, Service du travail obligatoire (STO) workers, French workers who had been sent to Germany to work as forced labour, were not. During the post-war period, there was an enduring suspicion that these men could have avoided the STO and joined the Resistance instead.

== Deconstructing the myth ==
Shortly after the Général de Gaulle's death in November 1970, a new approach to the History of World War II which was less anxious to write a "récit national" (national narrative) started to emerge.

=== The emergence of memories ===
Georges Pompidou who had not been part of the résistance, succeeded de Gaulle to the French Presidency in 1969. In a desire to formally end "this time when French people did not love each other", he abandoned the resistancialist tradition. Concomitantly, a new generation affirmed itself after the May 1968 events in France, greatly liberalizing French society.

In 1971, The Sorrow and the Pity by Marcel Ophüls definitively brought to an end the patriotic myth of mass resistance by depicting a country which wallowed in the collaboration. Time (magazine) wrote that the film punctured "the bourgeois myth—or protectively askew memory—that allows France generally to act as if hardly any Frenchmen collaborated with the Germans". This was followed in 1972 by the publication of Vichy France: Old Guard and New Order, 1940–1944 by Robert Paxton, which directly challenged the traditional view pioneered by Robert Aron's Histoire de Vichy (1954). Paxton argued that the Vichy government was in fact eager to collaborate with Nazi Germany and did not practice "passive resistance" to German rule. The book was translated into French in 1973 and was welcomed by both communists and the Jewish community, while receiving mixed reactions among resistance groups because of the claim that there was no real resistance until 1941.

=== A late recognition ===
In the 1970s, the emergence of a memory around anti-Jewish policies under the Vichy regime led to a first prosecution in France for crimes against humanity in 1979, 15 years after a law made this crime imprescriptible. Jean Leguay, second in command in the French National Police during the Nazi Occupation of France had been one of the main instigator of the Vel' d'Hiv Roundup in which 13,152 Jews were arrested and sent into deportation, including 4 000 children. Although Leguay died before the end of the instruction, this prosecution opened a path for the French justice and the trials followed one another in the 1980s. Klaus Barbie was extradited from Bolivia in 1983 and sentenced to life imprisonment in 1987 for his role in the roundup of the Izieu Children and the murder of numerous resistants fighters, including Jean Moulin. Paul Touvier was arrested in 1989 and also sentenced to life imprisonment in 1994 for the execution of 7 Jewish hostages at the Rillieux-la-Pape cemetery in 1944. After serving as budget minister under Valéry Giscard d'Estaing, Maurice Papon was in 1998 convicted of crimes against humanity for his participation in the deportation of more than 1600 Jews during the occupation.

Simultaneously, stories emerged from the Nazi concentration camps survivors, and the complicity of occupied states in these atrocities. In 1985, Shoah by Claude Lanzmann gave a voice to these former detainees in a 9 hours long documentary. French Jews organized themselves in associations like the Sons and Daughters of Jewish Deportees from France created by Serge Klarsfeld. The 50th anniversary of the Vel' d'Hiv round up was commemorated in 1992 by François Mitterrand, but it was not until July 1995 that President Jacques Chirac formally recognized the responsibility of the state in the deportation of French Jews during the Second World War.

== See also ==
- The Holocaust in France
- "Good German"
- Vichy syndrome
