= Good German =

Term for being passive in the face of atrocity

Good Germans is an ironic term — usually placed between single quotes such as 'Good Germans' — referring to German citizens during and after World War II who claimed not to have supported the Nazi regime, but remained silent and did not resist in a meaningful way. The term is further used to describe those who claimed ignorance of the Holocaust and German war crimes.

Pól Ó Dochartaigh and Christiane Schönfeld edited a volume on different cultural representations of the 'Good German' and state in their introduction: "After the division of Germany in 1949, finding 'good Germans' whose record helped legitimize each of the new German states became a core aspect of building a new nation in Germany and of the propaganda battle in this respect between the two German states."

== See also ==
- Colonial amnesia
- Myth of the clean Wehrmacht
- German collective guilt
- Italiani brava gente
- Résistancialisme
- Responsibility for the Holocaust
- The Good German – a 2006 Steven Soderbergh film
- Wehrkraftzersetzung
- Rommel myth
