= National memory =

Form of collective memory defined by shared experiences and culture

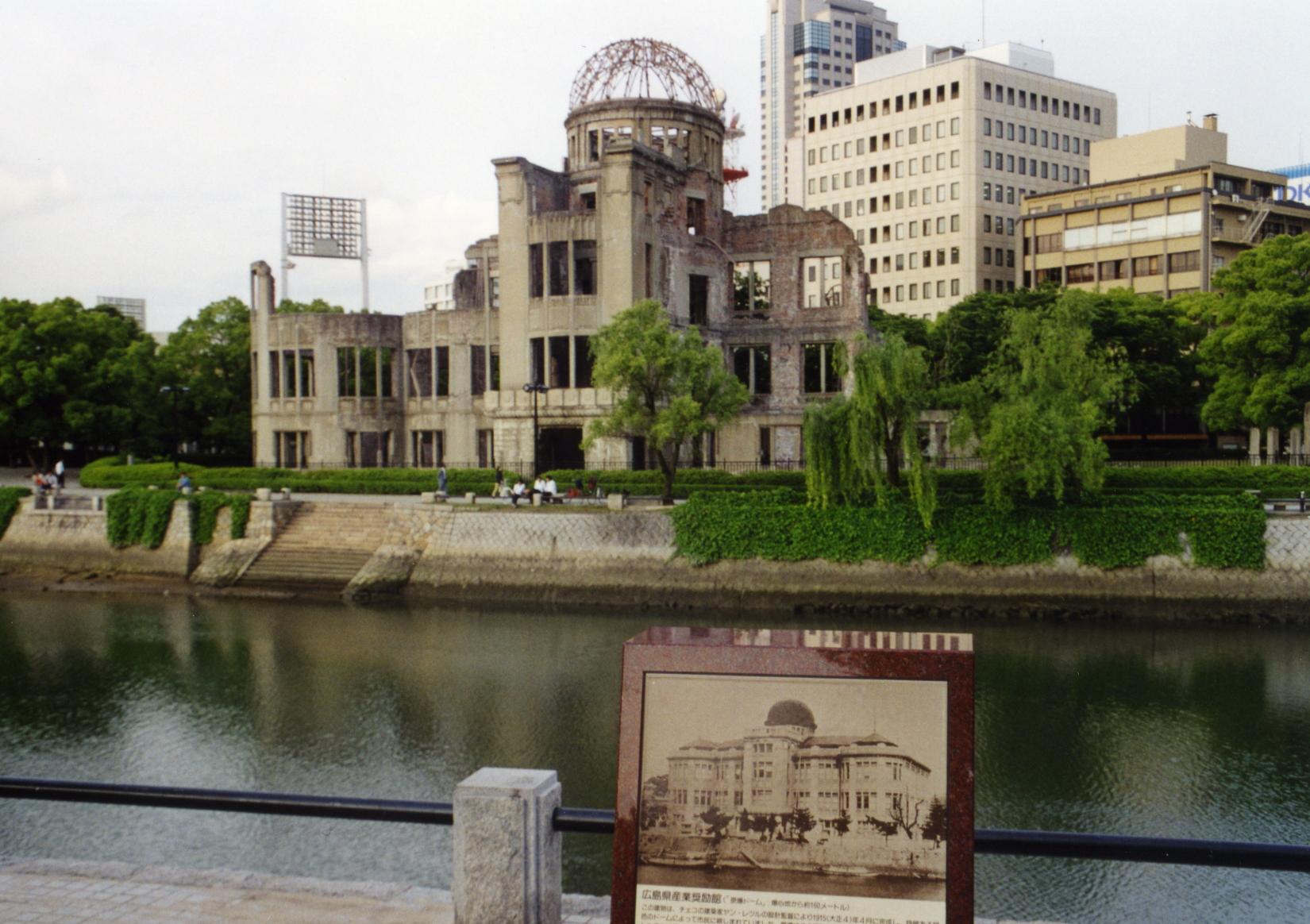
The atomic bombing of Hiroshima and Nagasaki by the United States military at the end of WWII has shaped Japanese national memory throughout the 20th and 21st Centuries.

National memory is a form of collective memory defined by shared experiences and culture. It is an integral part to national identity.

It represents one specific form of cultural memory, which makes an essential contribution to national group cohesion. Historically national communities have drawn upon commemorative ceremonies and monuments, myths and rituals, glorified individuals, objects, and events in their own history to produce a common narrative.

According to Lorraine Ryan, national memory is based on the public's reception of national historic narratives and the ability of people to affirm the legitimacy of these narratives.

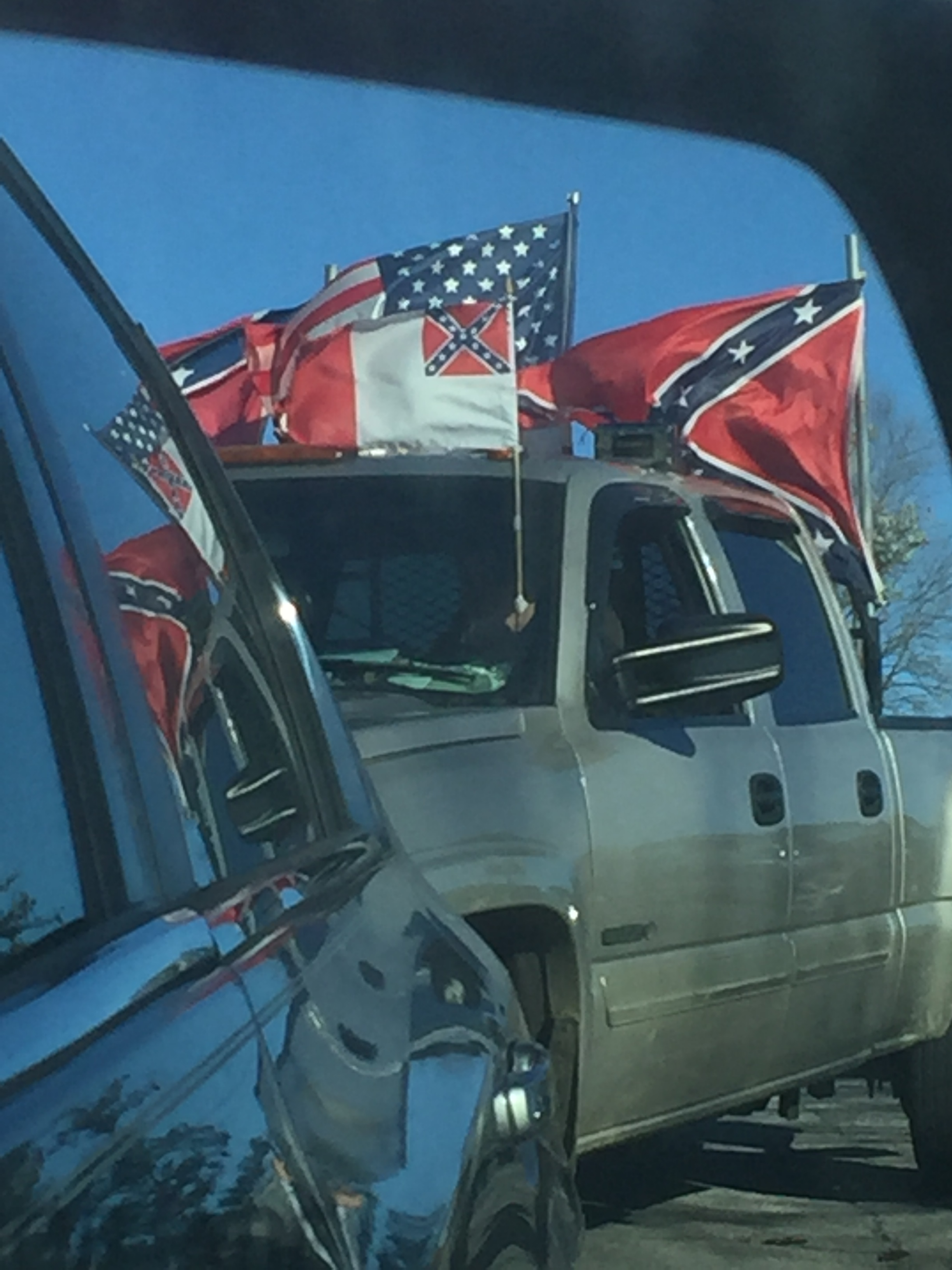
Conflicting versions of national memory can be seen in this image, as the modern United States flag is flown alongside a Confederate National flag and a Confederate Battle flag. These flags represent the legacy of two armies that were historically in direct conflict with one another during the American Civil War. Despite two of these flags representing an enemy of the United States, they are all flown together with the intention of communicating the owner's modern patriotism.

== Conflicting versions, dynamicity, manipulation and subjectivity ==
National memory typically consists of a shared interpretation of a nation's past. Such interpretations can vary and sometimes compete. They can be challenged and augmented by a range of interest groups, fighting to have their histories acknowledged, documented and commemorated and reshape national stories. Often national memory is adjusted to offer a politicized vision of the past to make a political position appear consistent with national identity. Furthermore, it profoundly affects how historical facts are perceived and recorded and may circumvent or appropriate facts. A repertoire of discursive strategies functions to emotionalize national narratives and nationalize personal pasts.

National memory has been used calculatedly by governments for dynastic, political, religious and cultural purposes since as early as the sixteenth century.

Marketing of memory by the culture industry and its instrumentalization for political purposes can both be seen as serious threats to the objective understanding of a nation's past.

Lorraine Ryan notes that individual memory both shapes and is shaped by national memory, and that there is a competition between the dominant and individual memories of a nation.

Hyung Park states that the nation is continuously revived, re-imagined, reconstituted, through shared memories among its citizens.

National memories may also conflict with other nations' collective memories.

== Role of the media ==
Reports that are narrated in terms of national memory characterize the past in ways that merge the past, the present and the future into "a single ongoing tale".

Pierre Nora argues that a "democratisation of history" allows for emancipatory versions of the past to surface:

National memory cannot come into being until the historical framework of the nation has been shattered. It reflects the abandonment of the traditional channels and modes of transmission of the past and the desacralisation of such primary sites of initiation as the school, the family, the museum, and the monument: what was once the responsibility of these institutions has now flowed over into the public domain and been taken over by the media and tourist industry

— Nora 1998, 363

However, national history being passed on by the culture industry, such as by historical films, can be seen as serious threats to the objective understanding of a nation's past.

=== International media ===
Nations' memories can be shared across nations via media such as the Internet (through social media and other means of widespread communication) and news outlets.

== Effects and functions ==
National memory can be a force of cohesion as well as division and conflict. It can foster constructive national reforms, international communities and agreements, dialogue as well as deepen problematic courses and rhetoric.

Identity crisis can occur in a country due to large-scale negative events such as crime, terroristic attacks (on a national or international scale), war, and large changes made over a short period of time. The negative mood created by these events will eventually find a way to be expressed. This crisis can also occur during periods of economic political uncertainty, which can lead to citizens becoming uncertain of and questioning their own identities or losing them altogether.

New developments, processes, problems and events are often made sense of and contextualized by drawing from national memory.

== Critical national memory ==
Critical history or historic memory cuts from national memory's tradition centric to national heritage and orients itself towards a specialized study of history in a more sociological manner.

It has been proposed that the unthinkable ought not to be unmasked but that instead what made it thinkable should be reconstructed and that the difficulty of discussing the non-places or the bad places of national memory make it necessary to include forgetfulness and amnesia in the concept. The absence of belief in a shared past may be another factor.

National memory may lead to questioning the nation as it is as well as its identity and imply a societal negotiation of what the country wishes to be as a nation. To understand the links between memory, forgetfulness, identity and the imaginary construction of the nation analysis of the discourse in the places of memory is fundamental as in all writings of national history an image of the nation is being restructured.

== See also ==
- Collective trauma
- Cultural heritage
- Culture of Remembrance
- De-commemoration
- Every Second Counts (video contest)
- External memory (psychology)
- Genocide denial
- Hauntology
- Historical negationism
- Holocaust Memorial Days
- Identity formation
- Les Lieux de Mémoire
- Memorialization
- Memory space (social science)
- Memory work
- Media manipulation
- National archives
- National day
- National heritage site
- National History Museum
- National memorial
- National monument
- Politics of memory
- Postcolonial amnesia
- Public opinion
- Reconstructive memory
- Social amnesia
- Transgenerational trauma
- Vergangenheitsbewältigung
- War memorial
