= Lieu de mémoire =

Entity vested with historical significance in popular collective memory

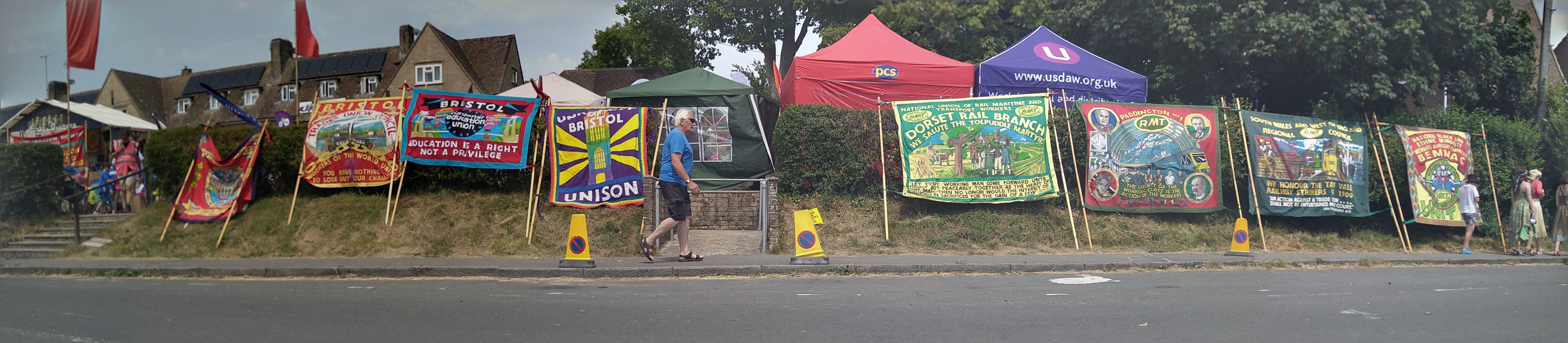
A lieu de mémoire in the village of Tolpuddle, Dorset

A lieu de mémoire (French for "site of memory" or memory space) is a physical place or object which acts as container of memory. They are thus a form of memorialisation related to collective memory, stating that certain places, objects or events can have special significance related to group's remembrance. It is a term used in heritage and collective memory studies popularised by the French historian Pierre Nora in his three-volume collection Les Lieux de Mémoire (published in part in English translation as Realms of Memory). Nora describes them as “complex things. At once natural and artificial, simple and ambiguous, concrete and abstract, they are lieux—places, sites, causes—in three senses—material, symbolic and functional”.

== Definition ==
In Nora's words, "A lieu de mémoire is any significant entity, whether material or non-material in nature, which by dint of human will or the work of time has become a symbolic element of the memorial heritage of any community (in this case, the French community)" It may refer to any place, object or concept vested with historical significance in the popular collective memory, such as a monument, a museum, an event, a symbol like a flag or the French figure Marianne, even a colour vested with historical memory (the red flag of left politics, for instance). According to La Commission franco-québécoise sur les lieux de mémoire communs (French-Québécois Commission for Common Sites of Memory) a lieu de mémoire signifies the cultural landmarks, places, practices and expressions stemming from a shared past, whether material (monuments) or intangible (language and traditions). Nora follow's Lefebvre's discussions of the social production of space.

As sites of memory became better known and made official by governments, they can tend to homogenize varied local memories. In Nora's words: “In the past, then, there was one national history and there were many particular memories. Today, there is one national memory, but its unity stems from a divided patrimonial demand that is constantly expanding and in search of coherence.” Thus sites of memory may risk becoming "invented traditions".

David Frier, using the example of the Estádio Nacional in Lisbon, argues that sites of memory can be adaptable.

The concept has been listed in Le Grand Robert de la langue française, the authoritative French dictionary, and studied by scholars and others. There are attempts made to map sites of memory globally. Quebec and France have a joint commission to identify and codify sites of memory. An International Coalition of Sites of Conscience of more than 200 museums, monuments and other institutions around the world uses the concept to group "sites, individuals, and initiatives activating the power of places of memory to engage the public in connecting past and present in order to envision and shape a more just and humane future."

=== Criticism ===
Legg argues that Nora's notion of memory is a passive one, overridden by officially sanctioned history; but even Nora recognises the multiple different memories brought into the present. Legg also criticises Nora's over-emphasis of the nation.

Olick and Robbins have criticised the use of the term. They argue that lieu de mémoire is a redundant concept because everything can be considered to hold memory. However, Marschall responds that the term is useful because it highlights that memory is always attached to real sites.

Calling attention to the importance of "social forgetting", historian Guy Beiner has argued that "there is an evident need for major historical studies of lieux d’oubli to counterbalance the studies of lieux de mémoire."

== Examples ==
Public holidays constitute an important part of nation building and become important symbols of the nation. They can build and legitimise the nation and are intended to foster national unity, social cohesion and popular identification. Sabine Marschall argues that public holidays can be regarded as sites of memory, which preserve particular representations of historical events and particular national or public heroes.

== See also ==
- Cultural heritage
- Method of loci, a memorization technique based on spatial memory
- Memory work
- Religious Heritage of America and Future for Religious Heritage, examples of religious heritage
- Sacred natural site, a form of religious Natural heritage
