= Fascism Today =

1965 book by Angelo Del Boca and Mario Giovana

Fascism Today: A World Survey
- Cover of the 1969 English edition
- Authors: Angelo Del Boca and Mario Giovana
- Original title: I "figli del sole"
- Translator: R. H. Boothroyd
- Language: Italian
- Subject: Fascism
- Publisher: Feltrinelli Editore
- Publication date: 1965
- Publication place: Italy
- Media type: Print
- Pages: 532 (Pantheon Books edition)
- ISBN: 0-434-18040-8

Fascism Today: A World Survey is a book by the historian Angelo Del Boca, writing with Mario Giovana. It is a survey of radical right-wing movements, from the roots of fascism to a present-day (1960s) country-by-country discussion.

It was originally published in Milan, Italy as I "figli del sole" (English: The Children of the Sun) by Feltrinelli Editore in 1965. Translated, from the Italian, by R. H. Boothroyd, it was first published in English, in a 532-page hardcover, by Pantheon Books in 1969. Heinemann in London republished it in 1970.
