= Pierre Nora =

French historian (1931–2025)

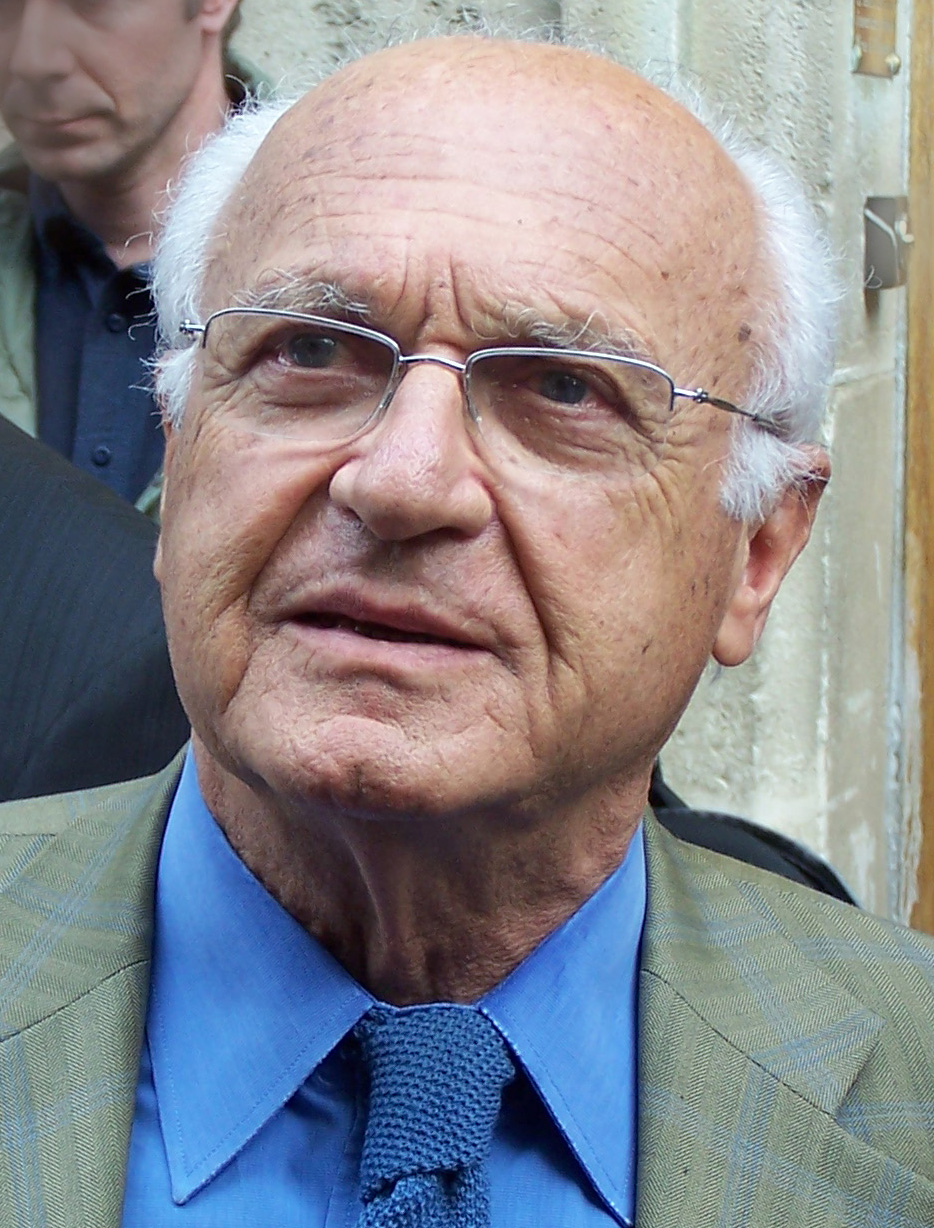
- Nora in 2011
- Born: 17 November 1931; Paris, France
- Died: 2 June 2025 (aged 93); Paris, France
- Education: Lycée Carnot
- Occupation: Historian
- Organizations: Éditions Gallimard; School for Advanced Studies in the Social Sciences
- Known for: Member of the Académie Française
- Partners: Gabrielle van Zuylen; Anne Sinclair
- Relatives: Simon Nora (brother)
- Awards: Ordre des Arts et des Lettres; Dan David Prize

Pierre Charles Nora (French: [pjɛʁ ʃaʁl(ə) nɔʁa]; 17 November 1931 – 2 June 2025) was a French historian elected to the Académie Française on 7 June 2001. As editor at Éditions Gallimard, he established the Library of Social Sciences in 1966 and the Library of Histories in 1970. He was director of studies at the School for Advanced Studies in the Social Sciences from 1977 for four decades. Nora is known for having directed Les Lieux de Mémoire, four volumes focused on places and objects of remembrance which incarnate the national memory of the French, writing a new history (nouvelle histoire).

== Early life and education ==
Nora was born in Paris on 17 November 1931, the youngest son of four children – the others were Simon, Jean and Jacqueline – born to Gaston Nora, a prominent Parisian urologist, (Note: Together with Louis Halphen and Robert Debré, Gaston Nora arranged for an integral translation of Mein Kampf after a previous French edition had systematically suppressed passages regarding Hilter's hostility to Jews. He was a secular Jew who was attracted to the theory, espoused by Halphen on the basis of a passage in a letter by St Martin, that French Jews were not descended from immigrants but rather from communities of indigenous Gallo-Romans who had converted to Judaism millennia ago, and therefore as authentically French as anyone else (Nora 2021, p. 27).) and his wife, Julie Lehman. During the war, he became acquainted with intellectuals Jean Prévost and Jean Beaufret, who was to become a major figure in the introduction of Heidegger's philosophy to France. In the 1950s, together with Jacques Derrida, he took hypokhâgne and khâgne at the Lycée Louis-le-Grand but, contrary to popular belief, he thrice failed to be accepted at the École Normale Supérieure. This setback, which he shared with his school-mate Pierre Vidal-Naquet, was one which Nora came to regard as a stroke of luck, particularly in terms of the example set by another friend, Jean-François Revel, since it made him believe he was led to live a far more interesting life than would otherwise have been the case, contrasting his own situation with that of Gérard Granel. Around this time, the poet René Char came to play an important role in his formation. Through him Nora met his first love, Madagascan Marthe Cazal (1907–1983), a major model for the figure of Justine in Lawrence Durrell's The Alexandria Quartet. Thereafter, he obtained a licence de lettres (equivalent to the Bachelor of Arts) degree in philosophy. He passed the agrégation d'histoire in 1958.

== Career ==
Nora taught at the Lycée Lamoricière d'Oran in Algeria from 1958 until 1960. He wrote a book about his experiences, published under the title Les Français d'Algérie ("The French of Algeria") (1961). In 1962, when the Évian peace treaty was signed – later confirmed by a subsequent referendum – which ended the Algerian War, a ceasefire came into effect. Nora, despite not knowing a word of Hebrew was asked to travel there and both look into the situation of Algerian Jews and secure their archives for repatriation. He met Ben Bella who, embracing him, asked Nora to sit by his side as his motorcade drove into Algiers the following day. Ben Bella was under the impression that Nora, whose account of Algeria he had read with admiration while in prison, was a member of the local Algerian Jewish community. During the same May week, he was stopped with several others by a group of insurgents and stood against a wall for execution, a fate avoided by the timely intervention of the local police.

From 1961 to 1963, he was a resident at the Fondation Thiers. From 1965 to 1977 he was first assistant and then lecturer at the Institut d'Études Politiques de Paris (Paris Institute of Political Science). From 1977 he was the director of studies at the École des hautes études en sciences sociales (School for Advanced Studies in the Social Sciences), holding the post for four decades. In 2014, Nora received the Dan David Prize for his contribution to "History and Memory."

=== Publishing ===
Concurrently, Nora had pursued an important career in publishing. He joined Éditions Julliard in 1964, where he created the Archives paperback collection. In 1965 he joined Éditions Gallimard: the publishing house, which already had a good market share in literature, wanted to develop its social sciences sector. It was Pierre Nora who achieved this mission by creating two important collections, the Library of social sciences in 1966 and the Library of histories in 1970, as well as the Témoins collection in 1967. At Éditions Gallimard, under Nora's direction many major works of scholarship were published that became landmarks in their respective fields, such as books by Raymond Aron, Michel Foucault, Emmanuel Le Roy Ladurie, Georges Duby, Georges Dumézil, François Furet and, Jacques Le Goff, and translations of books by Elias Canetti, Ernst Kantorowicz and Thomas Nipperdey.

This important role gave to Nora a certain power in French publishing and he was also the object of criticism. He declined to translate Eric Hobsbawm's work, The Age of Extremes (1994). Nora admired the book, admitted its high quality but after a long delay, turned it down, telling Hobsbawm that the high costs of translation would make its sale price prohibitive, and the French left itself, given the times, would be hostile. A further reason, Nora mentioned to a third party, was that the Shoah by then had moved to the centre of cultural memory and the word Auschwitz only appeared once in Hobsbawm's book. Publicly, he stated in 1997 that his rejection stemmed from the author's "attachment to the revolutionary cause". Nora explained that context of hostility towards Communism in France was not appropriate to that type of publication, that all the editors, "like it or not, had an obligation to take account of the intellectual and ideological situation in which they had written their works".

== Intellectual life ==
In May 1980, Nora founded at Gallimard the review Le Débat with philosopher Marcel Gauchet; this quickly became one of the major French intellectual reviews. In 1983, French historian Jacques Julliard judged Nora to be the natural heir to the role played by Raymond Aron. He also participated at the Saint-Simon Foundation, a think tank created in 1982 by François Furet – who had married Nora's sister, Jacqueline – and Pierre Rosanvallon, until it was dissolved in 1999.

He opposed himself to the law of 23 February 2005 "supporting national recognition and national taxation in favour of French repatriations" and cosigned a petition in the daily Libération entitled "Liberté pour l'histoire" This law, at line 2 of article 4, was abrogated on 15 February 2006, establishing that research programmes must be accorded more importance in lieu of French overseas presence and that the programmes of study came to recognize the positive role. Nora was well known for having directed Les Lieux de Mémoire, three volumes which gave as their point the work of enumerating the places and the objects in which are the incarnate national memory of the French. Nora's book Les Français d'Algérie ("The French of Algeria") (1961) has received scholarly criticism for its alleged bias against French Algerians ("Pieds-Noirs") – a prejudice held by many French intellectuals of the time. Nora posited that the French Algerians (or settlers) were different from the French of the Metropol. His opinions were developed from his two years as a high school teacher in Algiers. "The French of Algeria" is described as synthesizing "a self-righteous anti-pied noir discourse". "The French of Algiers" is often cited as a scholarly work, though some dissent. David Prochaska, American historian of French Algeria argues that it is in fact "not based on original research and is devoid of the usual scholarly apparatus".

== Personal life ==
Nora was the brother of Simon Nora, a senior French administrative professional. He was the uncle of Olivier Nora, the president and publisher of the French publishing house Editions Grasset.

He was married to art historian and curator Françoise Cachin from 1964 to 1976, and had a 40-year relationship with Gabrielle van Zuylen, who died in 2010. After 2012, he lived with French journalist and TV anchor Anne Sinclair, ex-wife of journalist Ivan Levaï and of former politician Dominique Strauss-Kahn. He had a son, now a biologist in San Francisco, by a third companion.

Nora was an Ashkenazi Jew. (Note: The name Nora is an anadrome reversing the order of letters of Aron, a form which conserves, while dissimulating, the Jewish name and yet retains a meaning – נורא (redoubtable, awesome). The change occurred when Moise Aron (1749–1813) complied with a Napoleonic decree that required names to be registered. These Arons were one of 4 families in Hellimer whose residence in Alsace had been confirmed by the authorization of Stanisław Leszczyński in the early 18th century.) (Note: As a child, he was drilled to recite his Jewish prayers, such as the Sh'ma Israël by the family governess and nursemaid, a practicing Breton Catholic spinster.) In 2001, on the occasion of his induction into the Académie française in the wake of the death of the novelist Michel Droit, he had his ceremonial sword inscribed with the Star of David to attest to his feeling that 'the Jewish contribution to the world belongs to things of the mind more than to weaponry. Because I shall consider myself Jewish as long as somewhere a Jew is threatened because of his identity.'

Nora died in Paris on 2 June 2025, at the age of 93.

== Honours and awards ==
=== Honours ===
- Grand Officer of the Legion of Honour
- Grand Cross of the National Order of Merit (France)
- Commander of the Ordre des Arts et des Lettres

=== Awards ===
- 1988: Prix Diderot-Universalis
- 1991: Louise-Weiss Award of the Bibliothèque nationale de France
- 1993: Grand prix Gobert of the Académie Française
- 1993: French Grand National History Prize.
- 2012: Prix Montaigne de Bordeaux
- 2014: Dan David Prize

=== Honorary degrees ===
- 1989: Université Laval

== Bibliography ==
Nora's works include:

- 1961: Les Français d'Algérie, prefaced by Charles-André Julien (Julliard, ISBN 978-2-267-02423-4).
- 1970–1979: Vincent Auriol. Journal du Septennat 1947–1954 (Armand Colin, OL 21089114M)
- 1973: Faire de l'histoire (Gallimard, ISBN 9782070290062)
- 1987: Essais d'ego-histoire (Gallimard, ISBN 9782220065120)
- 1984–1992: Les Lieux de mémoire (Gallimard), abridged translation, Realms of Memory, Columbia University Press, 1996–1998 (ISBN 9780231084048)
- 1999: Rethinking France: Les Lieux de mémoire, Volume 1: The State (University of Chicago Press, ISBN 9780226591322, OL 9305448M)
- 2006: Rethinking France: Les Lieux de mémoire, Volume 2: Space (University of Chicago Press, ISBN 9780226591339, OL 9706730M)
- 2009: Rethinking France: Les Lieux de mémoire, Volume 3: Legacies (University of Chicago Press, ISBN 9780226591346, OL 28425293M)
- 2010: Rethinking France: Les Lieux de mémoire, Volume 4: Histories and Memories (University of Chicago Press, ISBN 9780226591353, OL 28425294M)

== See also ==
- Memory space (social science)

== Notes ==
=== Cited sources ===
- Birnbaum, Jean (21 March 2021). "Pierre Nora, enfin père. L'historien signe " Jeunesse ", un essai autobiographique". Le Monde des Livres. Le Monde (in French).
- Dosse, François (2011). Pierre Nora, homo historicus. Librairie Académique Perrin. ISBN 978-2-262-03379-8.
- Evans, Richard J. (2019). Eric Hobsbawm: A Life in History. Hachette UK. ISBN 978-1-408-70742-5.
- Faustini, Pascal (2004). La communauté juive de Hellimer: documents 1700-1850 (in French). Thionville.
- Flandrin, Antoine (3 June 2025). "Pierre Nora, historian who shaped intellectual life in France, dies at 93". Le Monde.
- Gravé-Lazi, Lidar (11 February 2014). "Dan David Foundation Announces Winners of Prizes". The Jerusalem Post.
- Hanimann, Joseph (3 June 2025). "Er prägte unser Denken von Paris aus". FAZ (in German).
- Ivry, Benjamin (8 June 2011). "Building a Collective Consciousness on a National Scale". The Forward.
- Kendall, Jonathan (3 June 2025). "Pierre Nora, 93, Who Probed Role of Memory in the Writing of History, Dies". The New York Times.
- Montefiori, Stefano (26 May 2021). "Parigi, le confessioni di Anne Sinclair: "Ero sottomessa a Strauss Khan"". Corriere della Sera (in Italian).
- Noce, Vincent (7 February 2011). "Françoise Cachin, en pointillé". Libération (in French).
- Nonnenmacher, Kai (3 June 2025). "Zum Gedächtnis: Pierre Nora (1931–2025)". rentree.de (in German).
- Nora, Pierre (January–February 1997). "Traduire: nécessité et difficultés". Le Débat (in French). 93 (93): 93–95. doi:10.3917/deba.093.0093.
- Nora, Pierre (2021). Jeunesse (in French). Éditions Gallimard. ISBN 978-2-072-93867-2.
- Nora, Pierre; Rémond, René (2002). Discours de réception à l'Académie française et réponse de René Rémond (in French). Éditions Gallimard. ISBN 978-2-070-76745-8.
- Prochaska, David (2002) [First published 1990]. Making Algeria French: Colonialism in Bône, 1870 – 1920. Cambridge University Press. ISBN 978-0-521-53128-3.
- Shepard, Todd (2008). The Invention of Decolonization: The Algerian War and the Remaking of France. Cornell University Press. ISBN 978-0-801-47454-5.
- Tai, Hue-Tam Ho (June 2001). "Remembered Realms: Pierre Nora and French National Memory". The American Historical Review. 106 (3): 906–922. doi:10.2307/2692331. JSTOR 2692331.
- Terrade, Xavier (31 May 2021). "" Un être rare ": Anne Sinclair déclare sa flamme à Pierre Nora, son nouveau compagnon". Gala (in French).
- "Pierre Nora". Académie française (in French). 2025.
- "Pierre Nora". Dan David Prize. 2025.
- "Pierre Nora". La Procure (in French). 2025.
- "Pierre Nora". Radio France (in French). 2025.
