= Angelo Del Boca =

Italian historian (1925–2021)

Angelo Del Boca (23 May 1925 – 6 July 2021) was an Italian journalist and historian. He specialised in the study of the Italian Empire, and the involvement in Libya, Ethiopia, Eritrea, and Somalia during the first part of 20th century. Del Boca was the first post-war Italian scholar to devote himself extensively to the study of Fascist Italy's expansion in Africa, and to publish information on the crimes committed by the Italian army in Ethiopia and Libya during its period of fascism and World War II.

During his youth he took part in the Italian resistance movement. After the war he was editor for the newspaper Il Giorno, and later a professor of Contemporary History at the University of Turin. In 2002 Del Boca received an Honorary Doctorate from the University of Lucerne. Del Boca is widely regarded to have been one of the first historians to denounce Italy's use of poison gas.

== Life ==
Del Boca was born in 1925 in Novara.

At the age of 18, Del Boca was forced to join the military forces of the fascist Republic of Salò in order to ensure the release of his imprisoned father. He was sent for training in Germany during 1944, after which he assigned to the Monterosa Alpine Division. Del Boca deserted and joined the Italian resistance.

After World War II he joined the Italian Socialist Party of Proletarian Unity, here he began his career as a journalist writing for a socialist weekly. Soon he began writing for Il Giorno and Gazzetta del Popolo. During the rise of Bettino Craxi, Del Boca abandoned political writings and began focusing on historical research. In 1981 he left the Italian Socialist Party.

During his lifetime he would personally meet with Muammar Gaddafi and Haile Selassie. He would become a professor of contemporary history at the University of Turin's Faculty of Political Science.

Del Boca died on 6 July 2021 at the age of 96.

== Books ==
- ???? La Nostra Africa
- 1963 La Scelta
- 1965 Fascism Today
- 1965 La Guerra d'Abissinia, 1935-1941 English translation The Ethiopian War 1935-1941
- 1995 Il Negus (biography of Hayla Sellase (Haile Selassie)); English translation The Negus, 2012 Arcada Books
- 1996 Il Gas di Mussolini
- 2007 A un passo dalla forca, Baldini Castoldi Dalai, Milan 2007
- 2009 La storia negata. Il revisionismo e il suo uso politico, published by Neri Pozza.
- 2005 Italiani, brava gente?
