= Ivan Levaï =

French journalist (born 1937)

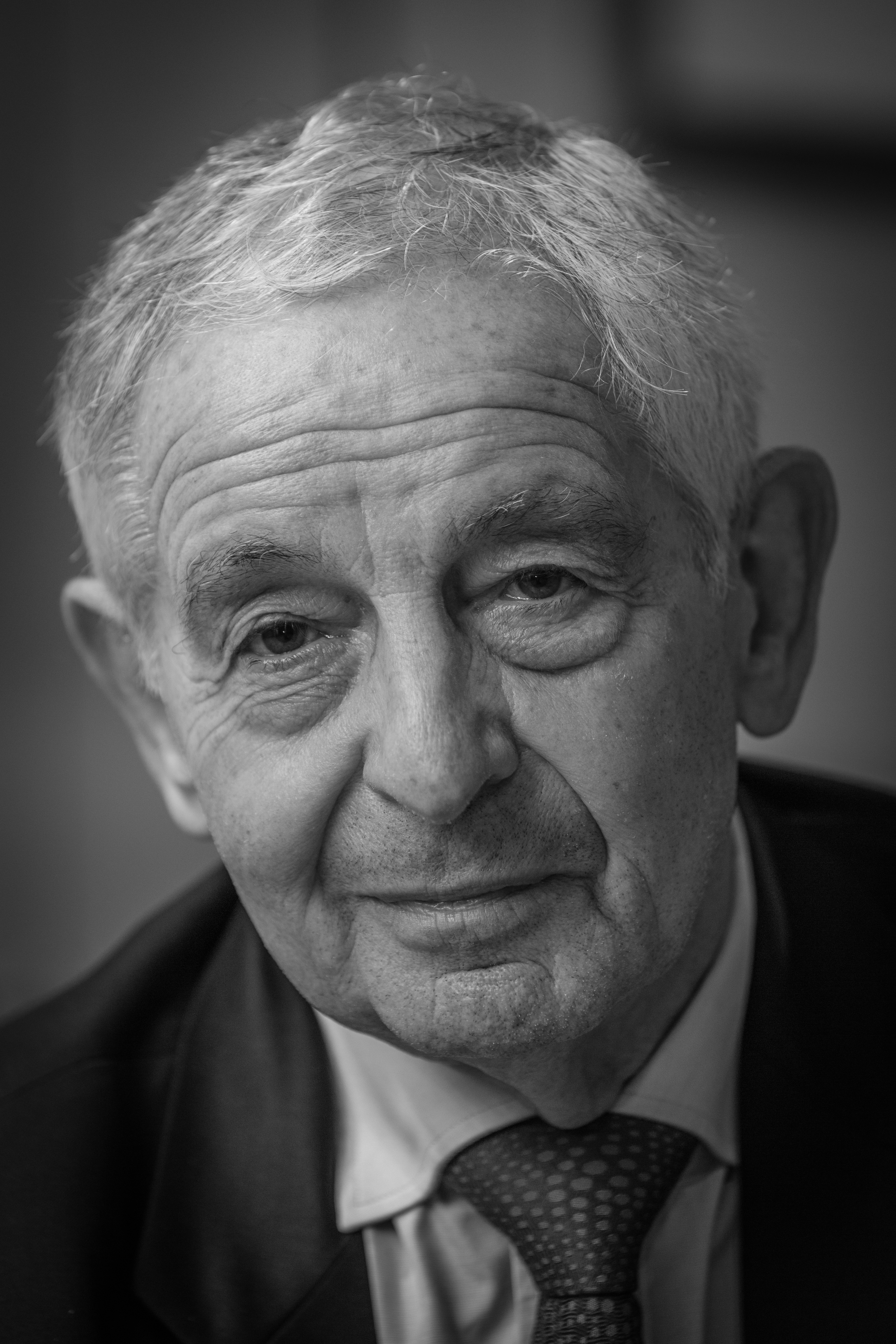
- Ivan Levaï in Saint-Dié-des-Vosges (2013)
- Born: 18 March 1937 (age 89); Budapest, Hungary
- Occupation: Journalist
- Spouse: Anne Sinclair (m. 1976; div. 1991)
- Children: 3

Ivan Levaï (French pronunciation: [ivɑ̃ ləvaj]; born 18 March 1937) is a French journalist. He has occupied many positions in radio, television and press journalism. For several years he presented the review of the press in the morning news show on France Inter radio. As of 2011 he presents a press review on France Inter on Saturday and Sunday mornings.

He was the first husband of Anne Sinclair with whom he has two sons.

== Biography ==
When he was only two years old, he and his mother left Hungary and sought refuge in France. Little Ivan was attending school in Paris at the start of World War II. After his mother died of an illness in Paris in 1941, Ivan was placed in the care of the OSE (Œuvre de secours aux enfants), which hid him in the countryside to protect him from the anti-Semitic persecution of the Vichy regime. He received a Protestant religious education, followed by a Catholic one.

== Works ==
- And why not? : morality and business / François Michelin; an interview with Ivan Levaï and Yves Messarovitch; translated by Marc Sebanc. c2003. French edition: Et pourquoi pas? / François Michelin; avec Ivan Levaï et Yves Messarovitch. 1998.
- La république des mots: de Mendès France à Chirac, dans les allées du pouvoir c2001.
- La Résistance en France. 1998
- La Seconde guerre mondiale : histoire parallèle; La Résistance en France : une épopée de la liberté. 1997.
- Vous devriez mettre une cravate bleue : politiques et médias: il faut tout changer!. 2002
