= Anne Sinclair =

French television and radio interviewer

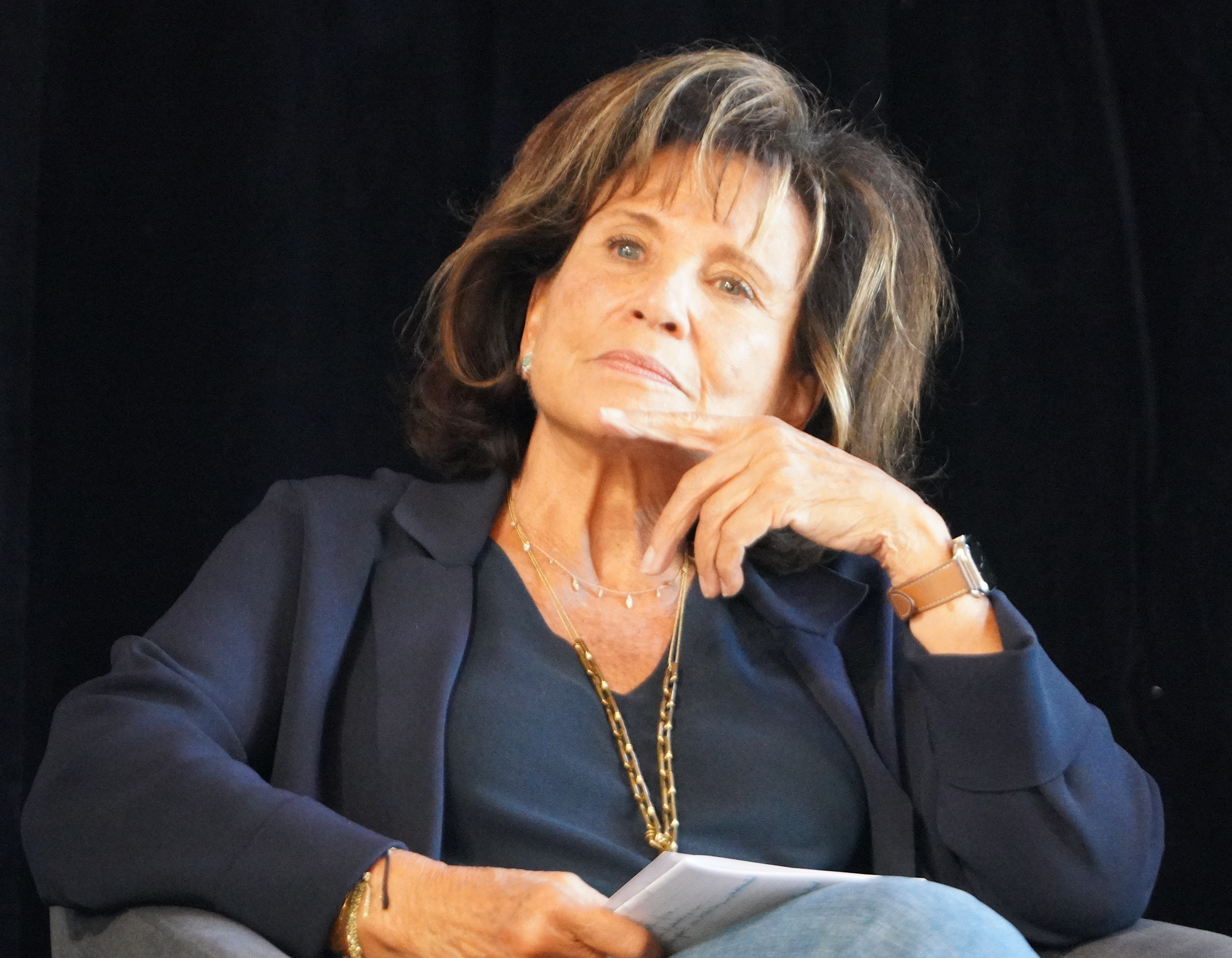
- Sinclair in 2025
- Born: Anne-Élise Schwartz; 15 July 1948 (age 78); New York City, U.S.
- Education: Sciences Po; University of Paris
- Occupations: Journalist, TV interviewer
- Notable credit: Two or three things from America (Political blog)
- Spouses: Ivan Levaï (m. 1976; div. 1991) Dominique Strauss-Kahn (m. 1991; div. 2013)
- Partner: Pierre Nora (2012–2025)
- Children: 2
- Relatives: Paul Rosenberg (grandfather)

Anne Sinclair (French pronunciation: [an sɛ̃klɛːʁ]; born Anne-Élise Schwartz; 15 July 1948) is a French-American television and radio interviewer. She hosted one of the most popular political shows for more than thirteen years on TF1, the largest European private TV channel. She is heiress to much of the fortune of her maternal grandfather, art dealer Paul Rosenberg. She covered the 2008 US presidential campaign for the French Sunday newspaper Le Journal du Dimanche and the French TV channel Canal+. She married French politician Dominique Strauss-Kahn in 1991 and divorced him in 2013 in the aftermath of the New York v. Strauss-Kahn case. She was portrayed in the 2014 feature film Welcome to New York.

== Early life and education ==
Anne-Elise Schwartz was born 15 July 1948 in New York City to Joseph-Robert Schwartz (officially changed to his war-time alias of Sinclair in 1949) and Micheline Nanette Rosenberg (1917-2006). Via her mother she is the maternal granddaughter of Paul Rosenberg, one of France's and later New York's biggest art dealers. Both of her parents were French-born Jews who had married pre-war, and who with Paul Rosenberg and his wife had fled from the Nazi persecution of Jews after the 1940 Nazi invasion of France.

A few years after her birth, the family returned to France. She attended the Cours Hattemer, a private school. She majored in politics at Sciences Po and in law at the University of Paris.

== Career ==
Sinclair's first radio hosting job was at Europe 1, one of the leading nationwide radio networks.

=== Television ===
Between 1984 and 1997 she hosted 7/7, a weekly Sunday evening news and political show on TF1 that had one of the largest audiences in France. She became one of the country's best known journalists and conducted more than five hundred interviews over the course of the show's thirteen-year run.

Every Sunday at 7 pm Sinclair hosted a one-hour interview with a leading French or international personality. She interviewed French presidents François Mitterrand and Nicolas Sarkozy as well as US president Bill Clinton, Mikhail Gorbachev, Shimon Peres, Felipe González, German chancellors Helmut Kohl and Gerhard Schröder, King Hassan II of Morocco, Hillary Clinton, the UN Secretary General in New York during the first gulf war, and Prince Charles.

Although primarily focused on politics, her show also included celebrities Madonna, Sharon Stone, Paul McCartney, Woody Allen, and George Soros. She conducted interviews with French cultural figures such as Johnny Hallyday, Alain Delon, Yves Montand, Simone Signoret, Bernard-Henri Lévy, and Elie Wiesel.

Sinclair won three Sept d'Ors, the French equivalent of the Emmy Awards.

=== After 7/7 ===
In 1997 she chose to leave the show to avoid conflict of interest when her husband Dominique Strauss-Kahn became French finance minister. She then created an Internet subsidiary company for her former employer TF1 and ran it for four years before returning to journalism. In 2003 she launched a cultural radio programme called Libre Cours (Free Rein) on France Inter, the French equivalent of NPR.

She also wrote bestsellers on politics: Deux ou trois choses que je sais d'eux (Grasset, 1997) and Caméra Subjective (Grasset, 2003).

In October 2008 she launched her blog Two or three things from America which comments daily on US and international political news. It has become one of the top twelve political French blogs. In 2012 her book on her grandfather was published (21 Rue La Boétie) and she is currently heading the French edition of the Huffington Post. My Grandfather's Gallery will be published by Farrar, Straus and Giroux in September 2014.

== Rosenberg collection and recovery ==
Her grandfather Paul Rosenberg, as well as dealing art, owned a major private collection of noted classical, impressionist and post-impressionist works. He lost many of these paintings after fleeing France for New York in 1940 with her parents, but managed to retain a number of works which he had distributed on noting the growing threat of war in the late 1930s.

As the sole heir to her parents' estate, after the death of her mother Micheline in 2007, Sinclair donated a 1918 Picasso painting of her grandmother and mother painted for Paul Rosenberg, to the Picasso Museum in Paris. She also sold an unwanted Matisse from her private collection in the same year, which raised in excess of $33M.

In October 1997, Rosenberg's heirs including Sinclair filed suit in United States District Court for the Western District of Washington, Seattle, to recover the painting Odalisque (1927 or 1928) by Matisse, the first lawsuit against an American museum concerning ownership of art looted by Nazis during World War II. In 2013, they demanded that the Henie Onstad Kunstsenter museum return Woman in Blue in Front of Fireplace (1937), a Matisse painting that was confiscated by the Nazis in 1941 in Paris.

== Personal life ==
Sinclair's first husband was French fellow journalist Ivan Levaï, with whom she has two sons.

In 1991, she married Dominique Strauss-Kahn, a French economist, senior politician, and the 2007-2011 managing director of the International Monetary Fund. She separated from Strauss-Kahn in August 2012 in the wake of a scandal due to accusations of sexual assault and his sexual affairs with other women. His trial made public the couple's joint ownership of homes in Place des Vosges; a $4 million townhouse in Georgetown, Washington, D.C.; and a house within a compound in Marrakesh, Morocco. They divorced in March 2013.

After separating from Strauss-Kahn, Sinclair lived with the French historian Pierre Nora until his death.

She resumed public life with a memoir of her grandfather, My Grandfather's Gallery, in 2014.

== Cultural depiction ==
A feature film Welcome to New York directed by Abel Ferrara (2014) was based on the Strauss-Kahn story. The film featured Gérard Depardieu as Devereaux, a character modeled on Strauss-Kahn, and Jacqueline Bisset as "Simone," a character based on Sinclair. The film was "built around the Sofitel scandal and portray[ed] both characters in an unforgiving light." Sinclair said the film was "disgusting" and Strauss-Kahn's lawyer said "his client would sue the film's producers for libel".

In 2020 Netflix released the documentary series Room 2806: The Accusation, a reconstruction of the Sofitel-affair and other cases of alleged sexual assault and misconduct by Strauss-Kahn, based on interviews with persons involved. Sinclair also gave an interview, but Strauss-Kahn did not.

== Selected works ==
- Une année particulière (an extraordinary year), 1982
- Deux ou trois choses que je sais d'eux, 1997
- Caméra subjective, 2002
- 21, rue La Boétie, Grasset & Fasquelle, Paris, 2012, ISBN 978-2-24673731-5 (a book about her grandfather, arts dealer Paul Rosenberg), 2013, ISBN 978-3-88897-820-3
- Chronique d'une France blessée : Juillet 2015-janvier 2017. Grasset & Fasquelle, March 2017, ISBN 978-2246812234
