= Frédéric Lavenir =

French business executive (born 1960)

Frédéric Lavenir (born 11 June 1960) is a French business executive who was the CEO of CNP Assurances, from September 2012 to July, 2018. Prior to that, he was an executive at BNP Paribas within the leasing and human resources divisions. Prior to joining that firm, he was the Deputy Director of the Economy, Finance and Industry for France, and before that an administrator for Trésor public. He graduated from HEC Paris and École nationale d'administration.

In July 2018, he resigned for "personal reasons" from his position at CNP Assurances.
