= Simon Nora =

French official (1921–2006)

- Born: 21 February 1921; Paris, France
- Died: 5 March 2006 (aged 85); Paris, France
- Education: Lycée Janson-de-Sailly
- Alma mater: École Libre des Sciences Politiques; École nationale d'administration
- Occupation: Civil servant
- Relatives: Pierre Nora (brother)

Simon Nora (21 February 1921 – 5 March 2006) was a senior functionary in the post-war French state administration, who served in several French cabinets and was the Inspecteur-general in the Ministry of Finance.

== Life and career ==
Nora was the eldest son of Gaston Nora, head of urology at the Rothschild Hospital. The family was secular, fully integrated into the Parisian Jewish bourgeoisie. His youngest brother is the historian Pierre Nora. During WW2, his father, who had formed a friendship with the influential Pétainist Xavier Vallat dating back to their days together in the trenches in World War I (Note: After the war, Gaston Nora testified on Vallat's behalf, stating that he had used his offices to save (some) Jews (Nora 2021, pp. 114–119; Lee 2014, p. 97).) remained in Paris (Note: As long as he headed the Commissariat-General for Jewish Affairs, Vallat protected Nora, though he was unable to intervene to save Gaston's sister Alice, who had been interned at Drancy and subsequently gassed at Majdanek concentration camp. In May 1942, he was replaced by Louis Darquier de Pellepoix, whom Vallat described as a "frightful bastard". Vallat offered Nora safe passage to the south, which he declined. A chance encounter with a former patient, who he had cured without payment, later enabled him to escape Gestapo round-ups targeting him. The woman knew a collaboratorist thug, who would tip him off and provide him with a safehouse regularly whenever the Nazis conducted searches for him (Nora 2021, pp. 114–119).) while sending his family away to avoid persecution and deportation. Simon joined the French Resistance in 1942, and was active in the areas of Jura and Vercours. After the armistice he frequented members of the former Vichy School of Uriage, which, after the régime had dissolved it, attracted numerous promising youths, who shared a contempt for the Third Republic and an intense desire to develop a new model for France.

In 1947, he married Marie-Pierre de Cossé-Brissac, despite his own father's concerns, and humiliating efforts by his future father-in-law, the Duke de Cossé-Brissac, to block their marriage on the grounds of Nora's social inferiority. They had two children, Fabrice and Constance, before their marriage ended in 1955. In 1953 he became economics expert for the newly-founded centre-left weekly L'Express He then married Léone Georges-Picot, secretary and chief of staff of Pierre Mendès France's government.

Acknowledged as a brilliant administrative functionary, Nora was close to Mendès France, an association that, according to his brother Pierre, became a recurrent obstacle throughout his later career under Charles de Gaulle, Georges Pompidou, François Mitterrand and Jacques Chirac. He was asked by President Valéry Giscard d'Estaing, who had once been Léone Nora's fiancé, (Note: When Giscard learnt that his former fiancée was to marry Simon, he tried to dissuade her, saying:'Listen now, that's out of the question. He's not one of ours' (Nora 2021, p. 80).) to write on the impact of the new communications technology on France. The report, The Computerization of Society, co-written with Alain Minc, appeared in 1978 and became a best-seller in France. The report was one of the first to propose an information highway, one result of which was the Minitel program.

In his later years, while working desultorily on a massive treatise that aspired to be a kind of Kapital of the 20th century, he studied Judaism together with Buddhism. He died of pancreatic cancer in 2006 without completing his book. Widely admired, his memory as a modernizer was commemorated a decade later with a posthumous Festschrift in his honour, Simon Nora: moderniser la France.

== Sources ==
- Bell, Daniel (1999) [First published 1976]. The Coming of Post-Industrial Society: : A Venture in Social Forecasting. Basic Books. ISBN 978-0-465-01281-7 – via Internet Archive.
- Frank, Robert [in French]; Roussel, Éric [in French]; Jeanneney, Jean Noël [in French], eds. (2016). Simon Nora: moderniser la France (in French). CNRS éditions. ISBN 978-2-271-08002-8.
- Lee, Daniel (2014). Pétain's Jewish Children: French Jewish Youth and the Vichy Regime. Oxford University Press. ISBN 978-0-198-70715-8.
- Nora, Pierre (2021). Jeunesse (in French). Gallimard. ISBN 978-2-072-93867-2.
- Nora, Simon; Minc, Alain (1980). The Computerization of Society: A Report to the President of France. MIT Press. ISBN 978-0-262-14031-7.
