= History & Memory =

- Discipline: History
- Language: English
- Edited by: Scott Ury

Publication details
- History: 1989-present
- Publisher: Indiana University Press
- Frequency: Biannually

Standard abbreviations
- ISO 4: Hist. Mem.

Indexing
- ISSN: 0935-560X (print); 1527-1994 (web)
- OCLC no.: 20506305

Links
- Journal homepage

History & Memory is a double-blind peer-reviewed academic journal covering the study of historical consciousness and memory. Prof. Scott Ury (Tel Aviv University) is the current editor of History & Memory. The journal's previous editors include Profs. Saul Friedländer, Dan Diner and Gulie Ne'eman Arad (1989–2000), Gadi Algazi (2001–2012) and José Brunner (2012–2020).

Published biannually by Indiana University Press, History & Memory is currently ranked Q1 (78% for history journals) with an H-index of 33 and an SJR of 0.366.
