= Vichy syndrome =

Shame, guilt and denial of actions by Vichy France

Vichy syndrome (French: syndrome de Vichy) is a term used to describe the guilt, denial and shame of French people regarding the actions of Vichy France. It was coined by Jewish historian Henry Rousso in his book The Vichy Syndrome (1987), wherein Vichy and the state collaboration of France remains a "past that doesn't pass away". Historiographical debates are still passionate and oppose different views on the nature and legitimacy of Vichy's collaborationism with Germany in the implementation of the Holocaust.

== Overview ==
=== History ===
Three main periods have been distinguished in the historiography of Vichy. Firstly, the Gaullist period aimed at national reconciliation and unity under the figure of Charles de Gaulle, who conceived himself above political parties and divisions. Then, the 1960s had Marcel Ophüls's film The Sorrow and the Pity (1971). In the 1990s, the trial of Maurice Papon, a civil servant in Bordeaux who had been in charge of the "Jewish Questions" during the war and was convicted after a very long trial (1981–1998) for crimes against humanity.

Papon's trial concerned more than individual actions but also the French administration's collective responsibility in the deportation of the Jews. His career after the war led him to be the prefect of the Paris police during the Algerian War (1954–1962), the treasurer of the Gaullist Union des Démocrates pour la République from 1968 to 1971 and the budget minister under President Valéry Giscard d'Estaing and Prime Minister Raymond Barre from 1978 to 1981, which was symptomatic of the quick rehabilitation of former collaborationists after the war.

Critics contend that his pathway was shared by others, although few had such public roles, and demonstrates France's collective amnesia. Others point out that the perception of the war and of the state collaboration has evolved during those years. Papon's career was considered more scandalous as he had been responsible, during his function as prefect of police of Paris, for the 1961 Paris massacre of Algerians during the war and was forced to resign from this position after the 1965 "disappearance" in Paris of the Moroccan anticolonialist leader Mehdi Ben Barka. Papon was convicted in 1998 for complicity with the Nazis in crimes against humanity. He was granted early release after serving only 4 years.

It is certain that the Vichy government and many of its top administration collaborated in the implementation of the Holocaust, but the exact level of such co-operation is still debated. Compared with the Jewish communities established in other countries invaded by Germany, French Jews suffered proportionately lighter losses (see Jewish death toll section above), but in 1942, repression and deportations started to strike French Jews, not just foreign Jews. Former Vichy officials later claimed that they did as much as they could to minimise the impact of the Nazi policies, but mainstream French historians contend that the Vichy regime went beyond the Nazis' expectations.

The regional newspaper Nice Matin revealed on 28 February 2007 that in more than 1,000 condominium properties on the Côte d'Azur, rules dating to Vichy were still "in force" or at least existed on paper. One of the rules, for example, stated:

The contractors shall make the following statements: they are of French nationality, are not Jewish, nor married to Jewish in the sense of the laws and ordinances in force [under Vichy, ed. note]

The president of the Conseil Représentatif des Institutions juives de France-Côte d'Azur, a Jewish association group, issued a strong condemnation labelling it "the utmost horror" when one of the inhabitants of such a condominium qualified that as an "anachronism" with "no consequences". Jewish inhabitants were able and willing to live in the buildings, and to explain that, the Nice Matin reporter surmised that some tenants may have not read the condominium contracts in detail, and others have deemed the rules obsolete.

A reason for the latter is that any racially discriminatory condominium or other local rule that may have existed "on paper", Vichy-era or otherwise, was abrogated by the French Constitution of 27 October 1946, which established the French Fourth Republic and was upheld by French Fifth Republic (1958), and was inapplicable under French antidiscrimination law. Thus, even if the tenants or co-owners had signed or otherwise agreed to these rules after 1946, any such agreement would be null and void (caduque) under French law, as well as the rules. Rewriting or eliminating the obsolete rules would have had to be done at the occupants' expense, including notary fees of €900–7000 per building.

=== Positions of French governments ===
Until Jacques Chirac's presidency, the official point of view of the French government was that the Vichy regime was an illegal government distinct from the French Republic, established by traitors under foreign influence. Vichy France eschewed the formal name of France ("French Republic") and styled itself the "French State", replacing the Republican motto of Liberté, Egalité, Fraternité (liberty, equality, fraternity) inherited from the 1789 French Revolution, with the motto Travail, Famille, Patrie (work, family, homeland). While the criminal behaviour of Vichy France was consistently acknowledged, this point of view denied any responsibility of the state of France by alleging that acts committed between 1940 and 1944 were unconstitutional acts devoid of legitimacy.

The main proponent of this view was Charles de Gaulle, who insisted, as did other historians afterwards, on the unclear conditions of the June 1940 vote granting full powers to Pétain, which was refused by the minority of Vichy 80. In particular, coercive measures used by Pierre Laval have been denounced by those historians who hold that the vote did not, therefore, have constitutional legality. In later years, de Gaulle's position was reiterated by President François Mitterrand. "I will not apologize in the name of France. The Republic had nothing to do with this. I do not believe France is responsible", he said in September 1994.

The first president to accept responsibility for the arrest and deportation of Jews from France was Chirac. In a 16 July 1995 speech, he recognised the responsibility of "the French State" for seconding the "criminal folly of the occupying country", in particular the French police, headed by René Bousquet, charged in 1990 with crimes against humanity, which assisted the Nazis in the enactment of the so-called "Final Solution". The July 1942 Vel' d'Hiv Roundup is a tragic example of how the French police did the Germans' work and even went further than was demanded by military orders by sending children to Drancy internment camp, the last stop before the extermination camps.

President Emmanuel Macron's statement on 16 July 2017 was even more specific, stating clearly that the Vichy regime was certainly the French State during the war and played a role in the Holocaust. Earlier in 2017, speeches made by Marine Le Pen made headlines by claiming that the Vichy government was "not France". Macron made this remark in discussing the Vel' d'Hiver roundup of Jews: "It is convenient to see the Vichy regime as born of nothingness, returned to nothingness. Yes, it is convenient, but it is false".

== "Sword and shield" argument ==
There was a currently controversial belief from the end of the war and through the 1960s that, in some way, almost everybody was in the Resistance, or at least supported it, and hard-line collaborators were a minority. Two additional popular beliefs go along with this theory, that of the "sword and shield", as well as the idea that to whatever extent there were harsh measures implemented by Vichy, it was because it was under the boot of the Germans and not due to the exercise of domestic governmental discretion.

During the war, the theory of the "sword and shield" (Thèse du bouclier et de l'épée) was raised as a defense of Vichy, whereby Pétain was seen as the "shield" protecting France and the French people within the country, while de Gaulle was seen as the "sword", engaging in combat from abroad. By this theory, Pétain was merely containing the German enemy to prevent an even worse outcome for France, while awaiting liberation through military action from without led by de Gaulle. This theory that Petain and de Gaulle were tacitly working together, first developed by Robert Aron in his 1954 Histoire de Vichy, was later deconstructed by historian Henry Rousso in his 1987 Syndrome de Vichy.

A lot of French people believed at the time of the occupation that this tacit agreement existed, according to Aron. Resistance member Gilbert Renault, alias Colonel Rémy, who founded the first resistance network in occupied France had great respect for Pétain, and felt that France could fight on two fronts, either with Pétain internally, or with de Gaulle from abroad, and he was not alone among resistance members who supported de Gaulle and sincerely admired Pétain.

Today, the few remaining Vichy supporters continue to maintain the official argument advanced by Pétain and Laval: state collaboration was supposed to protect the French civilian population from the Occupation's hardships. At his trial, Pétain proclaimed that Charles de Gaulle had represented the "sword" of France, and Pétain had been the "shield" protecting France.

== Purification ==
Munholland reports a widespread consensus among historians regarding the authoritarian character of the Vichy regime and its

broadly stated desire to regenerate a "decadent" state and society that had become corrupted by an ambient lassitude, secularism, and hedonism under the Third Republic by returning to earlier and purer values and imposing a greater discipline and dynamism upon the industrial order.

== Status of foreign Jews ==
Although that claim is rejected by the rest of the French population and by the state itself, another myth remains more widespread, the alleged "protection" by Vichy of French Jews by "accepting" to collaborate in the deportation and ultimately in the extermination of foreign Jews. That argument has been rejected by several historians who specialised in the subject, such as the widely recognised American historian Robert Paxton and the historian of the French police Maurice Rajsfus. Both were called on as experts during the Papon trial in the 1990s. Paxton declared before the court on 31 October 1997, "Vichy took initiatives.... The armistice allowed it a breathing space".

Vichy then decided on its own within the homeland, to implement the "National Revolution" ("Révolution nationale"). After naming the alleged causes of the defeat ("democracy, parliamentarism, cosmopolitanism, the left wing, foreigners, Jews,..."), Vichy had put in place by 3 October 1940 the first anti-Jewish legislation. From then on, Jewish people were considered "second-zone citizens."

Internationally, France "believed the war to be finished". Thus, by July 1940, Vichy eagerly negotiated with the German authorities in an attempt to gain a place for France in the Third Reich's "New Order", but "Hitler never forgot the 1918 defeat. He always said no." Vichy's ambition was doomed from the start. "Antisemitism was a constant theme", recalled Paxton. At first, it even opposed German plans. "At this time the Nazis had not yet decided to exterminate the Jews, but to expel them. Their idea was not to make of France an antisemitic country. On the contrary, they wanted to send there the Jews that they expelled" from the Reich.

The historic change came in 1941–1942, with the pending German defeat on the Eastern Front. The war then became "total", and in August 1941, Hitler decided on the "global extermination of all European Jews". The new policy was officially formulated during the January 1942 Wannsee Conference and had been implemented in all occupied countries in Europe by spring 1942. France, praising itself for having remained an independent state, as opposed to other occupied countries, "decided to cooperate. This is the second Vichy". The first train of deportees left Drancy on 27 March 1942, for Poland, the first in a long series.

Paxton recalled "The Nazis needed the French administration.... They always complained about the lack of staff", something which Maurice Rajsfus has also underlined. Although Paxton recognised during the trial that the "civil behavior of certain individuals" had permitted many Jews to escape deportation, he stated:

The French state, itself, participated in the policy of extermination of the Jews.... How can one claim the reverse when such technical and administrative resources were made available to them?

Pointing to the French police's registering of Jews and to Laval's decision, which had been taken completely autonomously in August 1942, to deport children along with their parents, Paxton added:

Contrary to preconceived ideas, Vichy did not sacrifice foreign Jews in the hope of protecting French Jews. At the hierarchy summit, it knew, from the start, that the deportation of French Jews was unavoidable.

Paxton then referred to the case of Italy, where deportation of Jewish people had started only after the German occupation. Italy surrendered to the Allies in mid-1943 but then was invaded by Germany. Fighting continued there until 1944. In particular, in Nice, "Italians had protected the Jews. And the French authorities complained about it to the Germans".

More recent work by the historian Susan Zuccotti finds that in general, the Vichy government facilitated the deportation of foreign Jews, rather than French Jews, until at least 1943:

Vichy officials [had] hoped to deport foreign Jews throughout France in order to ease pressure on native Jews. Pierre Laval himself expressed the official Vichy position.... In the early months of 1943, the terror [Adam] Munz and [Alfred] Feldman described in German-occupied France was still experienced by foreign Jews like themselves. It is difficult to know exactly how many French Jews were arrested, usually for specific or alleged offences, but on 21 January 1943, Helmut Knochen informed Eichmann in Berlin that there were 2,159 French citizens among the 3,811 prisoners at Drancy. Many had been at Drancy for several months. They had not been deported because, until January 1943, there had usually been enough foreigners and their children to fill the forty-three trains that had carried about 41,591 people to the east.... By January 1943, foreign Jews were increasingly aware of the danger and difficult to find. Nazi pressure for the arrest of French Jews and the deportation of those already at Drancy increased accordingly. Thus, when Knochen reported that there were 2,159 French citizens among the 3,811 prisoners at Drancy on 21 January 1943, he also asked Eichmann for permission to deport them. There had been no convoy from Drancy in December and January, and [SS Lieutenant Heinz] Röthke was pressuring Knochen to resume them. Röthke also wanted to empty Drancy in order to refill it. Despite Vichy officials' past disapproval and Eichmann's own prior discouragement of such a step, permission for the deportation of the French Jews at Drancy, except for those in mixed marriages, was granted from Berlin on 25 January.

Deportations from France started in summer 1942, several months after mass deportation from other countries had started. Whatever the Vichy government's initial or subsequent intent, the death rate was 15% for French Jews, slightly over half of that of non-citizen Jews residing in France. More Jews lived in France at the end of the Vichy regime than approximately ten years earlier.

== See also ==
- The Holocaust in France
- Résistancialisme
