= Robert Paxton =

American political scientist and historian (born 1932)

- Born: Robert Owen Paxton; June 15, 1932 (age 94); Lexington, Virginia, U.S.
- Education: Washington and Lee University (BA); Merton College, Oxford (MA); Harvard University (PhD)
- Known for: Historian and political scientist
- Scientific career
- Workplaces: Columbia University
- Notable students: Sharon Traweek

Robert Owen Paxton (born June 15, 1932) is an American political scientist and historian specializing in Vichy France, fascism, and Europe during the World War II era. He is Mellon Professor Emeritus of Social Science in the Department of History at Columbia University. He is best known for his 1972 book Vichy France: Old Guard and New Order, which precipitated intense debate in France, and led to a paradigm shift in how the events of the Vichy regime are interpreted.

== Early life and education ==
Robert Owen Paxton was born on June 15, 1932, in Lexington, Virginia. He attended Phillips Exeter Academy in New Hampshire for his secondary education. After Exeter, he received a B.A. from Washington and Lee University in 1954. Later, he won a Rhodes Scholarship and spent two years earning an M.A. at Merton College, Oxford, where he studied under historians including James Joll and John Roberts. He earned a Ph.D. from Harvard University in 1963.

== Career ==
Paxton taught at the University of California, Berkeley and the State University of New York at Stony Brook before joining the faculty of Columbia University in 1969. He served there for the remainder of his career, retiring in 1997. He remains a professor emeritus. He has contributed more than twenty reviews to The New York Review of Books, beginning in 1978 and continuing through 2017.

== Vichy ==
Paxton is best known for his 1972 book Vichy France: Old Guard and New Order, 1940–1944. In opposition to the traditional view pioneered by Robert Aron, he argued that the Vichy government was eager to collaborate with Nazi Germany and did not practice "passive resistance" to German rule. Unlike Aron and Henri Michel, Paxton did not play down Vichy's achievements in his explanation of its domestic agenda. He argued that the reforms undertaken by the Vichy government prefigured the reforms of the 1950s and 1960s and derived from Vichy's aim to transform French society.

Upon the book's publication in French translation in 1973, Paxton became the subject of intense vitriol from French historians and commentators. During a televised debate with Paxton in 1976, the Vichy naval leader Gabriel Auphan called him a liar. However, the translation sold thousands of copies, particularly to the young generation shaped by the civil unrest of May 1968 and who were uninterested in the "cozy mythologies" of Vichy apologists.

=== Paxtonian revolution ===
For decades prior to the 1970s modern period, French historiography was dominated by conservative or pro-Communist thinking, neither of them very inclined to consider the grass-roots pro-democracy developments at liberation.

There was little recognition in French scholarship on the active participation of the Vichy regime in the deportation of French Jews, until Paxton's 1972 book appeared. The book received a French translation within a year and sold thousands of copies in France. In the words of French historian Gérard Noiriel, the book "had the effect of a bombshell, because it showed, with supporting evidence, that the French state had participated in the deportation of Jews to the Nazi concentration camps, a fact that had been concealed by historians until then."

The "Paxtonian revolution", as the French called it, had a profound effect on French historiography. In 1997, Paxton was called as an expert witness to testify about collaboration during the Vichy period, at the trial in France of Maurice Papon.

=== French reaction and debate ===
Marc Ferro, a French historian, wrote that Vichy France would make the left feel uneasy by its contradiction of their belief that only the élite had betrayed France in 1940, "whereas in reality heroic resistance to the last man from Bayonne to Africa made no sense for anyone". He also noted that the Gaullists would object to Paxton's portrayal of them as "heirs of the regime they fought against" and that it would disturb all those who believed that Pétain had played a "double game" between the Axis and the Allies. Communists welcomed the book for buttressing their belief that Vichy had been the product of state monopoly capitalism, and it was also applauded by Jewish groups. The reaction among Resistance groups was mixed due to Paxton's argument that there was no serious Resistance until well into 1941.

In the preface to the 1982 edition of Vichy France, Paxton disagreed with the assertion of his opponents that he had written in "easy moral superiority" from the perspective of a "victor": "In fact [it] was written in the shadow of the war in Vietnam, which sharpened my animosity against nationalist conformism of all kinds. Writing in the late 1960s, what concerned me was not the comparison with defeated France but the confident swagger of the Germans in the summer of 1940."

Today, the book is considered a historical classic and one of the best studies on France in the Vichy era. It is so influential that Richard Vinen said that his

interpretation is completely orthodox, perhaps excessively orthodox, in France. In a funny way, Eric Zemmour's right to say that Paxton has become a pillar of the French establishment ... Historians will one day move beyond Paxton. In some ways, it's been hard for French people to do that because it seems as if you're making an apology for the Vichy government ... But even when people do turn against Paxton, they'll still say that this is a wonderful book, a classic example of how you might do a certain kind of history.

It was published at a time when French historians and filmmakers were also exploring history under the Vichy regime, as in Marcel Ophüls' influential two-part documentary The Sorrow and the Pity (1969).

In 1981, Paxton and historian Michael R. Marrus co-published the book, Vichy France and the Jews, which examined the Vichy regime's policy towards the Jews during World War II. The New York Times review of the book was written by Stanley Hoffmann, a Harvard professor and scholar on France.

As an expert on the Vichy era, Paxton co-wrote Claude Chabrol's 1993 documentary The Eye of Vichy. In 1997 he testified at the trial of Vichy bureaucrat Maurice Papon.

== Fascism ==
Paxton has focused his work on exploring models and definitions of fascism.

In his 1998 paper "The Five Stages of Fascism," he suggests that fascism cannot be defined solely by its ideology, since fascism is a complex political phenomenon rather than a relatively coherent body of doctrine like communism or socialism. Instead, he focuses on fascism's political context and functional development. The article identifies five paradigmatic stages of a fascist movement, although he notes that only Nazi Germany and Fascist Italy progressed through all five:

1. Intellectual exploration, where disillusionment with popular democracy manifests itself in discussions of lost national vigor
2. Rooting, where a fascist movement, aided by political deadlock and polarization, becomes a player on the national stage
3. Arrival to power, where conservatives seeking to control rising leftist opposition invite fascists to share power
4. Exercise of power, where the movement and its charismatic leader control the state in balance with state institutions such as the police and traditional elites such as the clergy and business magnates.
5. Radicalization or entropy, where the state either becomes increasingly radical, as did Nazi Germany, or slips into traditional authoritarian rule, as did Fascist Italy.

In his 2004 book The Anatomy of Fascism, Paxton refines his five-stage model and puts forward the following definition for fascism:

Fascism may be defined as a form of political behavior marked by obsessive preoccupation with community decline, humiliation, or victim-hood and by compensatory cults of unity, energy, and purity, in which a mass-based party of committed nationalist militants, working in uneasy but effective collaboration with traditional elites, abandons democratic liberties and pursues with redemptive violence and without ethical or legal restraints goals of internal cleansing and external expansion.

During the first presidential administration of Donald Trump, Paxton avoided what he called a "facile and polemical use of the fascist label" for Trump, rather preferring "a more unemotional term, such as oligarchy or plutocracy." However, in 2021, shortly after the January 6th attack on the U.S. Capitol, Paxton wrote in a Newsweek opinion article that he now saw applying the fascist label to Trump as unavoidable.

== Awards ==
In 2009, the French government awarded Paxton the Légion d'honneur, the highest French order of merit.

== Personal life ==
Paxton is an avid birdwatcher and a former president of the Linnaean Society of New York.

== Works ==
- Parades and Politics at Vichy (1966), Princeton University Press, ISBN 9780691051420.
  - L'Armée de Vichy (Paris: Tallandier Éditions, 2004), French translation.
- Vichy France: Old Guard and New Order, 1940–1944 (1972), Alfred A. Knopf, ISBN 9780394473604.
  - A new introduction prefaced the Morningside Edition published by Columbia University Press, 1982, ISBN 0231054270
  - Another new introduction prefaced the 2001 publication by Columbia University Press, ISBN 0231124694.
- with W. J. Boyle Jr, and D. A. Cutler. "Hudson-Delaware region." American Birds 32 (1978): 326–331.
- "The German Opposition to Hitler: A Non-Germanist's View." Central European History 14.4 (1981): 362–368.
- Vichy France and the Jews (1981), with Michael Marrus.
  - A new edition was published in 1995 by Stanford University Press, ISBN 0804724997.
- "The Nazis and the Jews in Occupied Western Europe, 1940–1944" (1982), with Michael Marrus, The Journal of Modern History vol. 54, no. 4. pp 687–714. online
- "Anti-Americanism in the Years of Collaboration and Resistance." in The Rise and Fall of Anti-Americanism ed. by Denis Lacorne et al. (Palgrave Macmillan UK, 1990) pp. 55–66.
- With Mame Warren. "Oral History Interview with Robert O. Paxton, April 18, 1996." online.
- French Peasant Fascism: Henry Dorgere's Greenshirts and the Crises of French Agriculture, 1929–1939 (1997).
- "The Five Stages of Fascism " (1998), The Journal of Modern History vol. 70, no. 1.
- The Anatomy of Fascism. Alfred A. Knopf. 2004. ISBN 1-4000-4094-9.
- "Vichy vs. the Nazis" (2008), The New York Review of Books.
- "Comparisons and definitions." The Oxford Handbook of Fascism ed The Oxford Handbook of Fascism ed by R.J.B. Bosworth (2010) pp 547–565.
- Europe in the Twentieth Century with co-author Julie Hessler, (1st ed. 1975; 5th edition, Wadsworth/Cengage 2011)
- "Vichy Lives!—In a way." The New York Review of Books (April 25, 2013) online.
- "American Duce: Is Donald Trump a Fascist or a Plutocrat?" Harper's Magazine (May 2017) online.
- with Manuel Bragança, and Fransiska Louwagie. "Interview with Robert O. Paxton, on the Writing of History and Ego-history." in Ego-histories of France and the Second World War (Palgrave Macmillan, Cham, 2018. 19–22).
- "Entering the Profession at the End of the Cold War" (2004, revised for H-DIPLO 2020 autobiography

== See also ==
- Vichy syndrome
