= Henry Rousso =

French historian (born 1954)

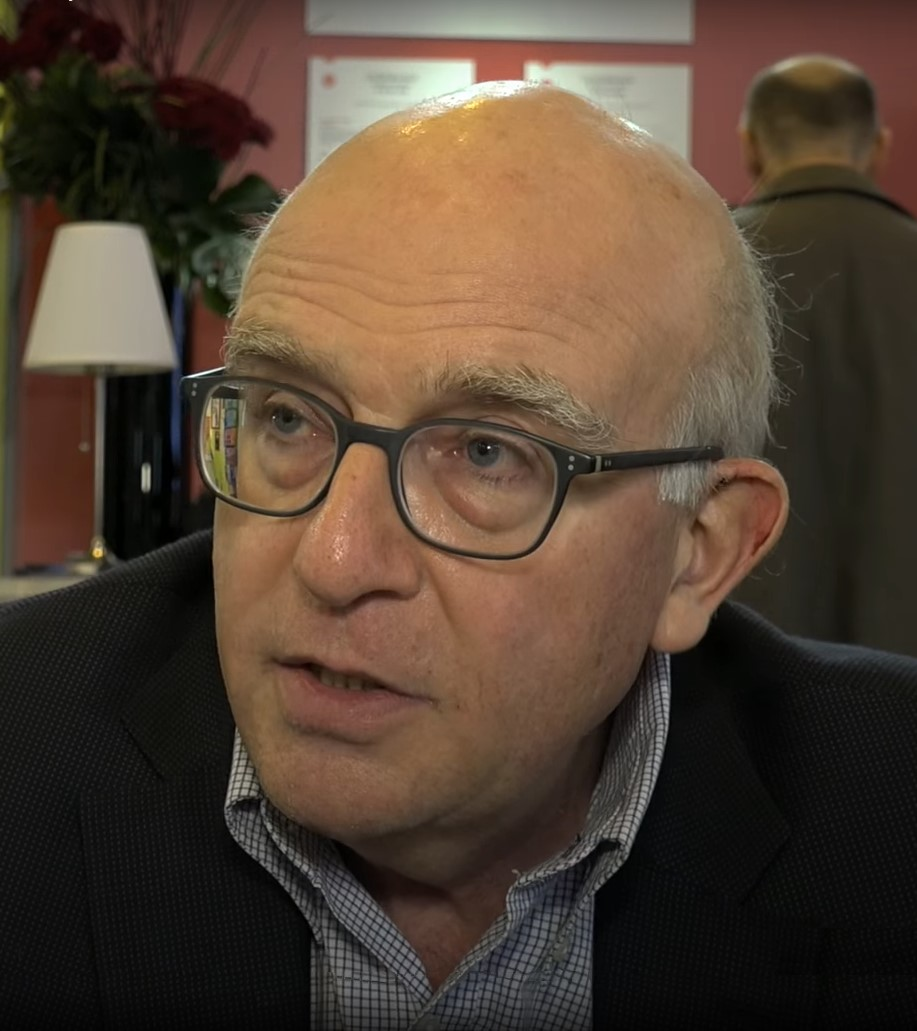
- Rousso in 2016
- Born: 23 November 1954 (age 71)
- Citizenship: French
- Occupation: Historian

Academic background
- Education: École Normale Supérieure de Saint-Cloud

Henry Rousso (born 23 November 1954) is a French historian who specialises in the history of France during World War II.

== Early life ==
Henry Rousso was born on 23 November 1954 in Cairo, Egypt, to a Jewish family. Forced out of Egypt under anti-Semitic measures instituted by the Nasser regime, and stripped of Egyptian nationality, they fled to France in 1956.

Rousso studied at the École normale supérieure de Saint-Cloud between 1974 and 1979, earning an agrégation in history in 1977. Rousso joined the National Centre for Scientific Research (CNRS) in 1981. The previous year, he participated in the foundation of the Institut d'Histoire du Temps Présent, which he directed between 1994 and 2005.

Rousso taught at the École normale supérieure de Cachan and the Institut d’études politiques de Paris. He has supervised PhD dissertations at Paris Nanterre University from 2001 to 2011, then at Panthon-Sorbonne University from 2011. Rousso currently serves as director of research at the CNRS.

Rousso is an editorial board member of several academic journals, including Conserveries mémorielles, Vingtième Siècle, History and Memory, South Central Review, and SegleXX. Revista catalana di Stòria.

He co-directed the collection "Contemporary European History" (Berghahn Books: Oxford/New York), along with Konrad Jarausch.

On 22 February 2017 Rousso was detained by U.S. Customs and Border Protection (CBP) agents for 10 hours on arrival at George Bush Intercontinental Airport in Houston and nearly deported. He had entered the United States to give a talk at Texas A&M University and was detained because he was entering the country on a tourist visa and was being paid a stipend for the talk. The Customs and Border Protection agent was unaware that such stipends are allowed for scholars.

== Works ==
Rousso's notable work includes a seminal book on Vichy France entitled The Vichy Syndrome (1987) where he coined a phrase commonly used to describe the era, un passé qui ne passe pas ("a past that doesn't pass").
