= Gérard Noiriel =

French historian

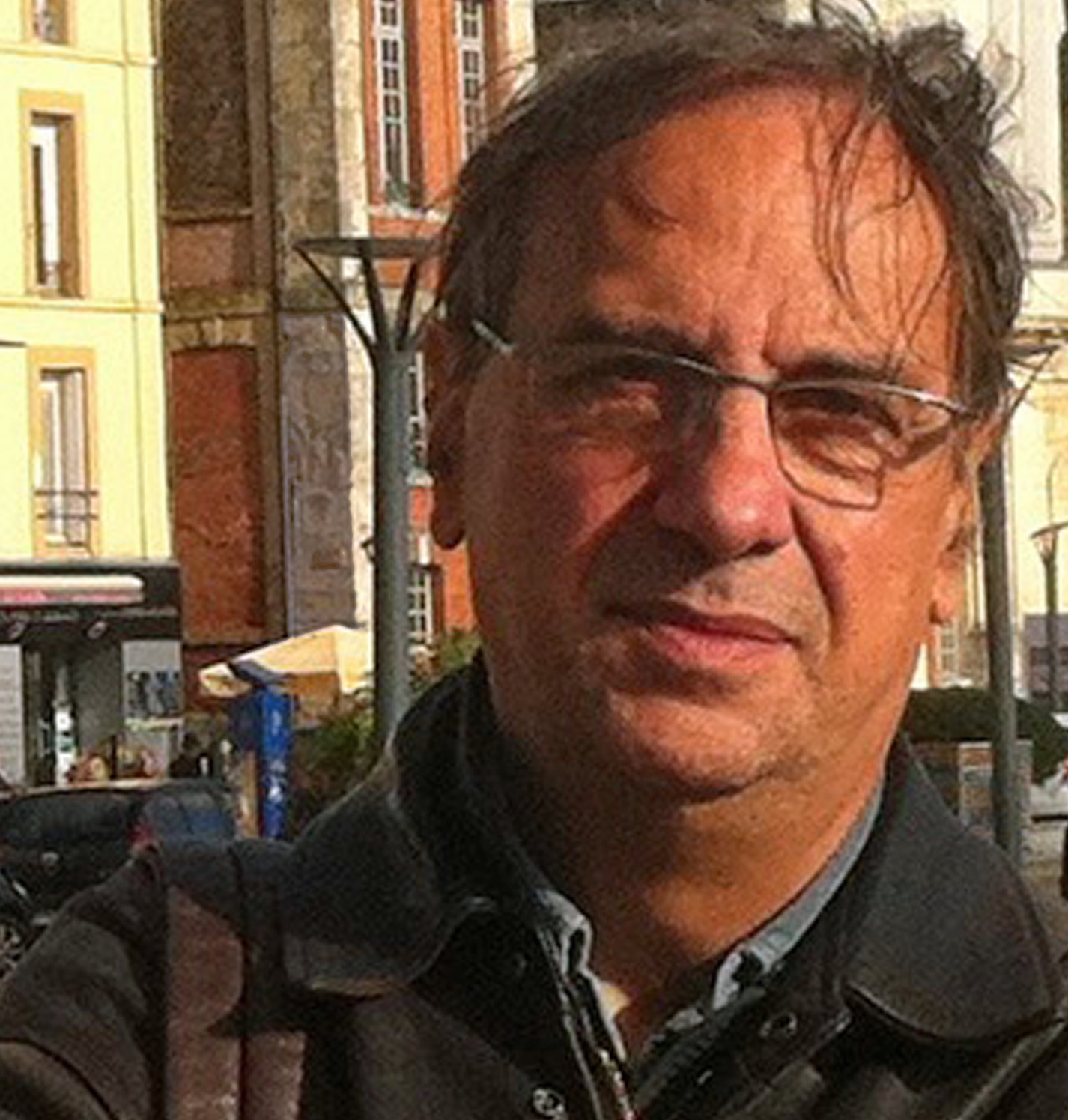
Gérard Noiriel

Gérard Noiriel (French pronunciation: [ʒeʁaʁ nwaʁjɛl]) is a French historian. He is director of studies at the School for Advanced Studies in the Social Sciences.

== Awards and honors ==
- Prix Augustin-Thierry 2010
- Prix Eugène-Colas 2019.
- Prix de l'Union rationaliste 2020
- Doctorat honoris causa from Saint-Louis University, Brussels in 2021.

== Publications ==
- Vivre et lutter à Longwy (avec Benaceur Azzaoui), Paris, Éditions Maspero, coll. « Débats Communistes », 1980 ISBN 2-7071-1145-7
- Longwy, Immigrés et prolétaires (1880-1980), Paris, Presses universitaires de France, coll. « Pratiques Théoriques », 1984
- Les Ouvriers dans la société française (XIX^{e} – XX^{e} siècle), Paris, Seuil, coll. « Points », 1986 ISBN 2-02-009309-X
- Le Creuset français. Histoire de l'immigration (XIX^{e} – XX^{e} siècle), Paris, Seuil, coll. « L'Univers Historique », 1988 ; réédité en coll. « Points-histoire », Paris, Seuil, 1992 ISBN 2-02-085954-8
- La Tyrannie du national. Le droit d'asile en Europe (1793-1993), Paris, Calmann-Lévy, 1991 ; réédité en collection de poche sous le titre Réfugiés et sans papiers. La République et le droit d'asile, XIX^{e} – XX^{e} siècle, Paris, Hachette, coll. « Pluriel », 1998 ISBN 2-01-278914-5
- Population, immigration et identité nationale en France (XIX^{e} – XX^{e} siècle), Paris, Hachette, coll. « Carré-Histoire », 1992 ISBN 2-01-016677-9
- Immigrants in Two Democracies. French and American Experience (ouvrage collectif dirigé en collaboration avec Donald L. Horowitz), New York University Press, 1992 ISBN 0-8147-3479-0
- Sur la « crise de l'histoire », Paris, Belin, coll. « Socio-Histoires », 1996 ISBN 2-7011-1799-2 ; réédité en « Folio-Histoire », Paris, Gallimard, 2005 ISBN 2-07-030671-2
- Construction des nationalités et immigration dans la France contemporaine (ouvrage collectif dirigé avec Éric Guichard), Paris, Presses de l'École normale supérieure, 1997 ISBN 2-7288-0234-3
- Qu'est-ce que l'histoire contemporaine ?, Paris, Hachette, coll. « Carré-Histoire », 1998 ISBN 2-01-145072-1
- Les Origines républicaines de Vichy, Paris, Hachette, 1999 ISBN 2-01-235442-4 (présentation en ligne)
- État, nation et immigration. Vers une histoire du pouvoir, Paris, Belin, coll. « Socio-Histoires », 2001 ISBN 2-7011-2759-9 ; réédité en coll. « Folio-Histoire », Paris, Gallimard, 2005 ISBN 2-07-030670-4
- Atlas de l’immigration en France, Paris, Autrement, coll. « Atlas-mémoires », 2002 ISBN 2-7467-0273-8
- Penser avec, penser contre. Itinéraire d'un historien, Paris, Belin, coll. « Socio-Histoires », 2003 ISBN 2-7011-3347-5 ; édition revue et augmentée publiée en 2014, dans la coll. « Histoire », Paris, Belin ISBN 978-2-7011-7777-9
- Gens d’ici venus d’ailleurs. La France de l’immigration de 1900 à nos jours, Paris, Éditions du Chêne, 2004 ISBN 2-84277-520-1
- Les Fils maudits de la République. L’avenir des intellectuels en France, Paris, Fayard, coll. « Histoire de la pensée », 2005 ISBN 2-213-61064-9 ; édition revue et actualisée publiée en 2010 chez les Éditions Agone, coll. « Éléments », sous le titre Dire la vérité au pouvoir : les intellectuels en question ISBN 978-2-7489-0124-5
- Introduction à la socio-histoire, Paris, La Découverte, coll. « Repères », 2006 ISBN 2-7071-4723-0
- Immigration, antisémitisme et racisme en France (XIX^{e} – XX^{e} siècle) : Discours publics, humiliations privées, Paris, Fayard, 2007 ISBN 978-2-213-63001-4
- À quoi sert l'identité nationale, Agone, coll. « Passé & présent », 2007 ISBN 978-2-7489-0080-4
- L'Identification. Genèse d'un travail d'État, Paris, Belin, coll. « Socio-histoires », 2007 ISBN 978-2-7011-4687-4
- Introduction à la socio-histoire, Paris, La Découverte, coll. « Repères », 128 p., 2008 ISBN 9782707147233,
- Histoire, théâtre et politique, Agone, coll. « Contre-feux », 2009 ISBN 978-2-7489-0103-0
- Le Massacre des Italiens - Aigues-Mortes, 17 août 1893, Paris, Fayard, 2010 ISBN 978-2-213-63685-6 ; réédité en 2018 aux éditions Pluriel ISBN 978-2-8185-0570-0
- Chocolat clown nègre. L'Histoire oubliée du premier artiste noir de la scène française, Paris, Bayard, 2012, 300 p. ISBN 978-2-227-48271-5
- Il n'y a pas de « question blanche »…, entretien de Gérard Noiriel avec Thierry Leclère (pages 34 à 38) dans De quelle couleur sont les blancs ? - Des « petits Blancs » des colonies au « racisme anti-Blancs », sous la direction de Sylvie Laurent et Thierry Leclère, La Découverte, coll. « Cahiers libres », 300 p., 2013.
- Qu'est-ce qu'une Nation?, Paris, Bayard, 105 p., 2015 ISBN 978-2227488274
- Chocolat. La véritable histoire d’un homme sans nom, Paris, Bayard, 600 p., 2016 ISBN 978-2-227-48617-1
- Les Historiens face à l’identité nationale, entretien avec Gérard Noiriel (pages 267 à 270), propos recueillis par Régis Meyran dans Identité(s) - L'individu, le groupe, la société, sous la direction de Catherine Halpern, Éditions Sciences Humaines, 352 p., 2016
- Une histoire populaire de la France, Marseille, Agone, coll. « Mémoires sociales », 2018 ISBN 978-2-7489-0301-0
- Le Venin dans la plume. Édouard Drumont, Éric Zemmour et la part sombre de la République, Paris, La Découverte, coll. « L’envers des faits », 2019 ISBN 978-2-348-04572-1
- Les Gilets jaunes à la lumière de l'histoire, Éditions de l'Aube/Le Monde, coll. « Le monde des idées », 130 p., 2019 ISBN 978-2-8159-3319-3
- Race et sciences sociales, avec Stéphane Beaud, Agone, 448 p., coll. « Épreuves sociales », 2021 ISBN 978-2-7489-0450-5
