= Memory work =

Memory work is a process of engaging with the past which has both an ethical and historical dimension. During memory work, the process of producing an image or what we refer to as the production of the imaginary, is central. Therefore, the key in the analysis of remembered history are contradictions. This calls for an expanded archive that includes the "oral and popular tradition" as well as the written traditions normally associated with the archives.

== History and memory ==
The premise for memory work or travail de memoire is that history is not memory. We try to represent the past in the present through memory, history and the archives. As Paul Ricoeur argued, memory alone is fallible. Historical accounts are always partial and potentially misrepresent since historians do not work with bare, uninterpreted facts. Historians construct and use archives that contain traces of the past. However, historians and librarians determine which traces are preserved and stored. This is an interpretive activity. Historians pose questions to which the archives responds leading them to “facts that can be asserted in singular, discrete propositions that usually include dates, places, proper names, and verbs of action or condition”. Individuals remember events and experiences some of which they share with a collective. Through mutual reconstruction and recounting collective memory is reconstructed. Individuals are born into familial discourse which already provides a backdrop of communal memories against which individual memories are shaped. A group's communal memory becomes its common knowledge which creates a social bond, a sense of belonging and identity. Professional historians attempt to corroborate, correct, or refute collective memory. Memory work then entails adding an ethical component which acknowledges the responsibility towards revisiting distorted histories thereby decreasing the risk of social exclusion and increasing the possibility of social cohesion of at-risk groups.

== Jacques Derrida on memory work ==
After meeting at Yale University in 1966, Jacques Derrida was a colleague and friend of Paul de Man's until de Man's death in 1983. In 1984 Derrida gave three lectures, including one at Yale University on the art of memory. In Memories:for Paul de Man (Derrida 1986) described the relationship between memory work and deconstruction in this often-cited passage.

"The very condition of a deconstruction may be at work in the work, within the system to be deconstructed. It may already be located there, already at work. Not at the center, but in an eccentric center, in a corner whose eccentricity assures the solid concentration of the system, participating in the construction of what it, at the same time, threatens to deconstruct. One might then be inclined to reach this conclusion: deconstruction is not an operation that supervenes afterwards, from the outside, one fine day. It is always already at work in the work. Since the destructive force of Deconstruction is always already contained within the very architecture of the work, all one would finally have to do to be able to deconstruct, given this always already, is to do memory work. Yet since I want neither to accept nor to reject a conclusion formulated in precisely these terms, let us leave this question suspended for the moment."

== Barbara Gabriel on memory work ==
Barbara Gabriel provided a model for reading the complexities of memory and forgetting by situating unheimlich within the heimlich, in a Freudian 'one within the other structure'. As point of departure Gabriel examined Edgar Reitz's eleven-part West German television series entitled Heimat. Reitz' work was in response to a larger movement in Germany national memory work provoked in part by an American television series entitled the Holocaust followed viewed by millions. As European art in general and German art in particular resurged in the 1960s, artists like Günter Grass and Edgar Reitz captured international attention as they grappled with issues of identity in a divided, post-Holocaust Germany. Gabriel developed the concept of an impulse towards national memory work in Germany that stemmed from a haunted subject yearning for a lost, far away, nostalgic place, a utopic homeland. "How do we confront that which we have excluded in order to be, whether it is the return of the repressed or the return of the strangers?" In other words, that which we fear as 'other' is within ourselves through our shared humanity. Repressed memories haunt all of us.

== See also ==
- National memory
- Giorgio Agamben
- Walter Benjamin
- Deconstruction
- Eternal return
- List of deconstructionists
- Heinrich Heine
- Friedrich Nietzsche
- Post-traumatic stress disorder
- Postmodernity

== Bibliography ==
- Ricoeur, Paul. (1955) History and Truth. Translated by C. A. Kelbley. Evanston: Northwestern University press. (2nd edition 1965)
- Kristeva, Julia. (1982) Powers of Horror. New York: University Press.
- Kristeva, Julie. (1983) Nations without Nationalism, trans. L. S. Roudiez (Yale University Press, 1993)
- Derrida, Jacques (1986). Memories for Paul de Man. New York: Columbia University Press.
- Rousso, Henry. (1991) The Vichy Syndrome: History and Memory in France since 1944. Translated by A. Goldhammer. Cambridge/London: Harvard University Press.
- Derrida, Jacques. (1996) Archive Fever. Translated by E. Prenowitz. Chicago: University of Chicago Press
- Cixous, Hélene. (1997) Rootprints: Memory and Life Writing: Routledge
- Ricoeur, Paul. (2000) La Mémoire, l'Historie, l'Oubli: l'ordre philosophique: Éditions du Seuil. https://web.archive.org/web/20061009224247/http://www.theology.ie/thinkers/RicoeurMem.htm
- Nora, Pierre. (2002) "The Reasons for the Current Upsurge in Memory." Tr@nsit-Virtuelles Forum.22 Retrieved Access 2002. http://www.eurozine.com/articles/2002-04-19-nora-en.html
- Gabriel, Barbara. (2004) "The Unbearable Strangeness of Being; Edgar Reitz's Heimat and the Ethics of the Unheimlich" in Postmodernism and the Ethical Subject, edited by B. Gabriel and S. Ilcan. Montreal & Kingston: McGill-Queen's University Press.
- Haug, Frigga. (2008) "Australian Feminist Studies" in Memory Work. Volume 23, 537–541.
- Basu, Laura. (2011) "Memory dispositifs and national identities: The case of Ned Kelly" in Memory Studies Journal: 4(1): 33-41
