= McAliskey =

McAliskey is a surname. Notable people with the surname include:

- Bernadette Devlin McAliskey (born 1947), also known as Bernadette Devlin and Bernadette McAliskey, a socialist republican political activist
- John McAliskey (born 1984), professional English footballer
- Róisín McAliskey (born 1971), Irish political activist and elder daughter of republican activists Bernadette and Michael McAliskey
