= The Captive Dreamer =

1972 memoir by Christian de La Mazière

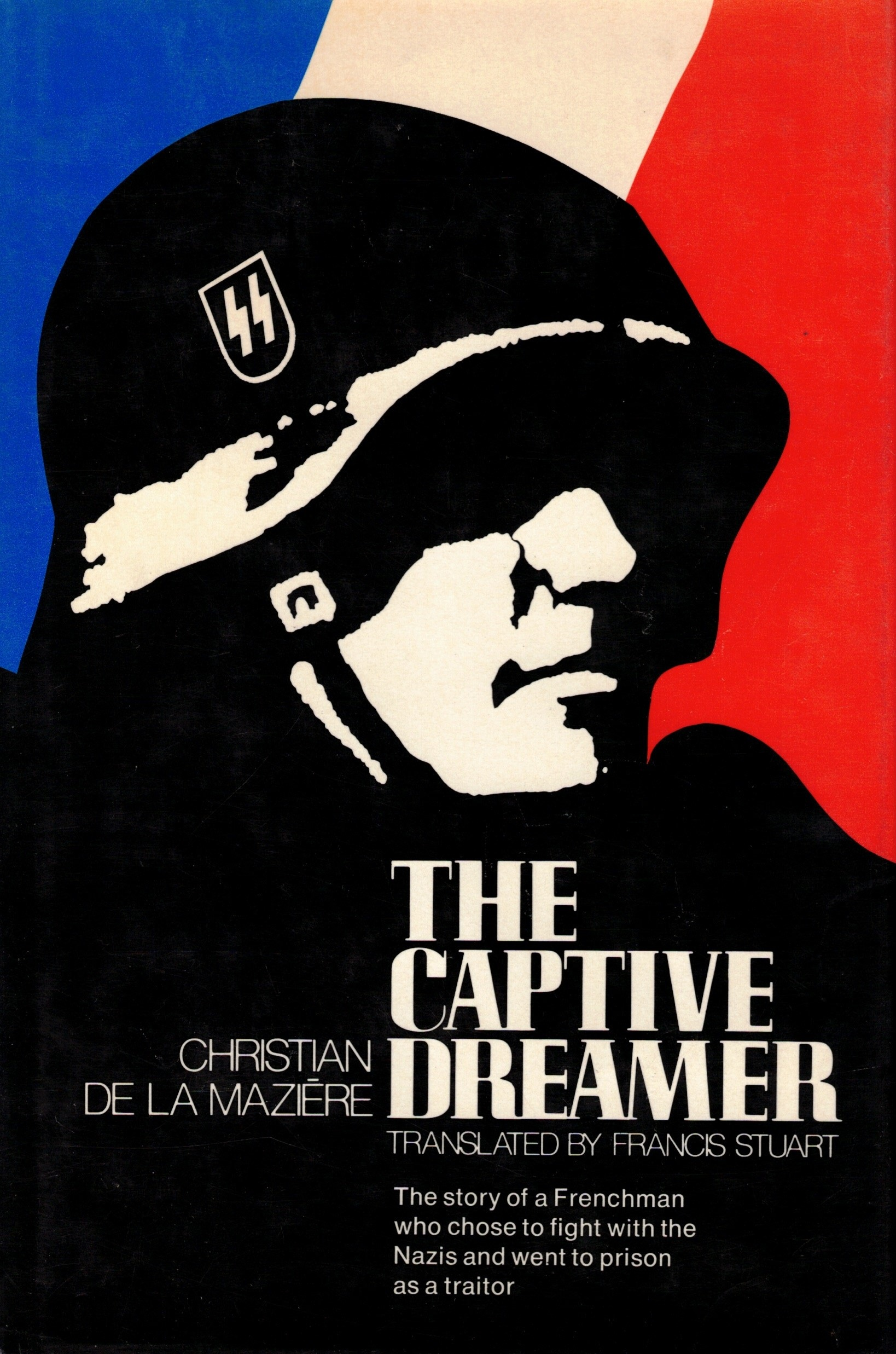
- Cover of the first English edition
- Author: Christian de La Mazière
- Original title: Le Rêveur casqué
- Translator: Francis Stuart (into English)
- Language: French
- Series: Vécu
- Subject: World War II experiences
- Published: 1972 (Éditions Robert Laffont) (French); 1974 (Saturday Review Press) (English)
- Publication place: France
- Media type: Print
- ISBN: 2-221-02815-5
- OCLC: 681259
- LC Class: D757.85 .L35
- Followed by: Le Rêveur blessé

The Captive Dreamer (French: Le Rêveur casqué, lit. 'The Helmeted Dreamer'), also published in English as Ashes of Honour, is a 1972 memoir written by Christian de La Mazière, a French journalist and former member of the Waffen-SS who had enlisted out of ideological commitment to Nazism shortly before the Allies were to retake France from the occupation. It was published three years after de La Mazière's appearance in The Sorrow and the Pity, where he also recounted his wartime experiences, which brought him to public attention. It recounts primarily his wartime experiences as a member of the Waffen-SS, but also his life prior, and the aftermath of his military service. The English edition is prefaced by Nicholas Wahl.

De La Mazière writes that he no longer believes what had led him to enlist, but that he would "never be so embittered as to discourage the faith of those who are twenty years of age". Published by Robert Laffont as part of their Vécu series in 1972, it was a commercial success upon release. It was translated into English by Francis Stuart, published first as The Captive Dreamer by Saturday Review Press in 1974, and then as Ashes of Honour in London a year later. Several commentators noted that, though he expressed some regrets, de La Mazière was largely unapologetic over his involvement in Nazism.

== Background and publication history ==
Following Christian de La Mazière's interviews for the 1969 documentary The Sorrow and the Pity, where he recounted his wartime experiences, he became something of a celebrity to the French public, leading to complaints from French Resistance figures. However, his personal and career prospects were severely damaged, with most of his clients leaving once his history as an SS member was publicized. As a result, he decided to write a book on his experiences.

Le Rêveur casqué was first published by in 1972 by French publisher Robert Laffont as part of their Vécu series. The publisher was looking for a book to fulfill an audience desire for the "darker" side of the war. It was a commercial success, with 40,000 copies sold in three weeks. In 1974, it was translated into English as The Captive Dreamer by Francis Stuart, published by Saturday Review Press. Le Rêveur casqué would, taken literally, translate to 'The Helmeted Dreamer', not The Captive Dreamer. The Stuart translation was published again in London by Wingate in 1975, this time under the title Ashes of Honour.

De La Mazière was accused of having fabricated some of the stories contained in the book, particularly one about the circumstances under which he had been repatriated from Moscow; de La Mazière countered by asking why he would have fabricated a story like that and provided evidence in the form of a letter where another prisoner agreed with his account. De La Mazière followed the book with a second memoir in 2003, Le Rêveur blessé (lit. 'The Wounded Dreamer').

== Contents ==
The English edition is introduced by Nicholas Wahl. Following the introduction is a quote attributed to Drieu La Rochelle: "One is more faithful to an attitude than to ideas."

The book recounts de La Mazière's experiences in World War II. In comparison to his appearance in the documentary, his telling is far more detailed. He describes his background in an aristocratic French family. He enlisted in the Waffen-SS, in a period where many others were trying to leave Nazism, while knowing that they would lose as allied forces approached France in August 1944. He joined out of sheer ideological commitment to Nazism, what he says was to be "true to himself", saying he had taken "the leap choosing action and adventure". He portrays himself as an idealist, drawn to fascism out of dislike of the corruption of traditional values and the threat posed by communists. Prior to his enlistment, he had spent several years in right-wing groups in pre-war France.

When his unit was captured, he was treated well due to his family's aristocratic background. He describes how he was afterwards imprisoned, though he received a short sentence due to friends who were part of the resistance testifying for him. He recalls his involvement after the war with several other fascist collaborators, including Lucien Rebatet and Claude Jeantet. De La Mazière writes that his discovery of the horrors the war had led to, particularly the concentration camps, "shatter[ed his] illusions" about Nazism. He says he knew of the camps, but did not know their purpose. Though his family was antisemitic, he writes that he did not feel any racial hatred against Jews but saw them as "a symbol; to oppose them was to fight against international capitalism". He says he no longer shares the beliefs that led him to enlist. Writing in a preface, de La Mazière writes that he has since realized "those great, simple truths that had escaped me in the kind of magic circle I had shut myself into: that war is hideous, fanatical beliefs murderous, and death the supreme evil".

He writes that he will "never be so embittered as to discourage the faith of those who are twenty years of age. I believe, though, I have earned the right to urge prudence, not as regards the act of commitment itself, but in the choice that leads to it." The book ends with de La Mazière's pardoning.

== Reception and analysis ==
De La Mazière was generally portrayed favorably in reactions to his book, despite their dislike for the views he espoused. Samuel Hux writing for Worldview said that in reading the book, "one somehow rather likes La Mazière, the nihilistic boy scout", attributing this to his normality and familiarity, while in contrast a review in the Canadian newspaper the Waterloo Region Record called the book disquieting and said it "did not sit well". Alex McGregor for The Ottawa Journal was more critical of De La Mazière and his self-representation, criticizing him as "another misguided bourgeois kid" who received better treatment after the war than he deserved. He called his excuses for his alleged lack of knowledge of the camps despite his antisemitism poor, and called the work "a good prodigal son story, but not a great one", but nevertheless recommended the book for educators, to show the negative consequences of them doing a poor job.

It was noted by several reviewers to not be apologetic for what the author had partaken in. A review by Peter Shaw in the American magazine Commentary described it as "express[ing] some regrets and offer[ing] a few self-justifications", but said rather than an apology or an apologia it seemed "an apologue—a moral fable". The Swiss newspaper Tribune de Lausanne - Le Matin said it was detached from the previous fanaticism of his old beliefs, but also not bittered by them; they said it was told without nostalgia or complacency. The French newspaper Le Monde said Le Rêveur casqué was told in language "often truculent and, in any case, devoid of complexes", and not an apology but a "very relaxed chronicle of a crazy adventure". Shaw said it had "some unsettling truths for those who might have been de la Mazière's victims", with the author seeming "both intelligent and idealistic and yet a fascist [...] not especially concerned about the horrors with which he associated himself". His self-portrayal was called "self-justificatory" by Kay Chadwick for French Historical Studies.

French political scientist Jean-Yves Camus noted it as one of a kind of literature which had been mainstream before "migrating to the marginal subculture of the Far Right". A writer for the French journal Inflexions praised Le Rêveur casqué for at least "giving the impression of standing out" compared to the rest of the "few rather largely fictionalized and even more or less hagiographic works" about the French fighters for Germany in World War II. Steven E. Aschheim noted de La Mazière described his entrance into the Waffen SS in "almost caricaturistic Nietzschean terms".
