= Christian de La Mazière =

French journalist (1922–2006)

- Photo used on the back of his 1972 book Le Rêveur casqué
- Born: Christian Clodomir Martial Lamazière; August 22, 1922; Tours, France
- Died: February 15, 2006 (aged 83); Paris
- Notable work: The Captive Dreamer

Christian Clodomir Martial Lamazière (22 August 1922 – 15 February 2006), better known as Christian de La Mazière, was a journalist and member of the Charlemagne Division of the Waffen-SS. He enlisted in the Charlemagne Division shortly before the Liberation of Paris in August 1944, fighting Soviet troops in Pomerania from February to March 1945 before his capture. Afterwards he was put on trial and sentenced to five years in prison, of which he served two. He then worked in public relations and journalism.

He is known for discussing his role in the 1969 documentary The Sorrow and the Pity. He wrote a memoir of his war experiences in 1972, Le Rêveur casqué, translated into English as The Captive Dreamer, and a second memoir, Le Rêveur blessé (lit. 'The Wounded Dreamer'). He also advised Gnassingbé Eyadéma, the president of Togo. De La Mazière moved to working as a journalist for the conservative Beta Press, Le Figaro Magazine and eventually Révolution Européenne.

== Early life ==
Christian Clodomir Martial Lamazière was born in Tours, France on 22 August 1922. He was born to an aristocratic family, the son of a general and diplomat. His family was anti-communist and antisemitic, but were anti-republican royalists rather than fascists.

== Military experiences ==
In 1939, de La Mazière enlisted in the French Army (though he had no combat experience) and remained in the military of Vichy France until 1942. After being discharged, he worked for the fascist newspaper Le Pays Libre.

Shortly before the end of the war, with an allied victory imminent, a friend of his offered a chance to switch sides; instead, de La Mazière joined the Charlemagne Division just before the Liberation of Paris in August 1944. He trained in Wildflecken. He arrived in Pomerania with the division to fight the Soviets on 27 February 1945, fighting about Körlin in early March before retreating with some others. He was taken prisoner there by Polish forces in the Red Army on 27 March.

== Post-war life ==
Despite pretending to have served as a forced labourer, de La Mazière was revealed as a member of the Waffen-SS. During his trial, he claimed that he knew of arrests but denied knowing about a deliberate extermination plan or the existence of extermination camps, and lied throughout his imprisonment that instead of being a combatant he had been acting as a journalist for the Waffen-SS. His family planned that he would plead insanity to spare him from going to prison, but de La Mazière refused. In 1946 he was sentenced to five years in prison, of which he served two. He initially had trouble finding work due to his criminal conviction, and worked menial jobs at Les Halles. He later worked in public relations with a company he founded, International Relations Press.

He is known for discussing his SS career in Marcel Ophuls' 1969 documentary The Sorrow and the Pity, where he was one of the main interviewees. Explaining his reasons for agreeing to be interviewed, he said:

Nobody, from then on, could keep me from answering not Harris's call but the call from an inner voice that day after day became more demanding, more pressing. That voice told me that by confessing, explaining, and questioning, I would recover my lost dignity and my identity; and also that I would do justice to all those who had fallen on the Eastern Front and who deserved, because they had remained faithful to the cause they had embraced, to join the long cohort of the men who wanted to change history.

This experience made him something of a celebrity to the French public, but had the effect of damaging his employment prospects, with most of his clients leaving once his history as an SS member was publicized. Afterwards he returned to working as a journalist, writing for the conservative Beta Press before moving to Le Figaro Magazine and eventually the right-wing publication of Révolution Européenne. In the 1980s he was a "personal advisor" of Gnassingbé Eyadéma, the president of Togo. As a result of his portrayal in the documentary, he decided to write a book on his experiences.

== Books ==
In 1972 his book Le Rêveur casqué was published by Robert Laffont. The book was a commercial success and it was translated into English as The Captive Dreamer by Francis Stuart. He also wrote another memoir in 2003, Le Rêveur blessé (lit. 'The Wounded Dreamer').

== Death ==
De La Mazière died 15 February 2006 in Paris.

== Publications ==
- de La Mazière, Christian (1972). Le Rêveur casqué. Vécu (in French). Éditions Robert Laffont.
  - de La Mazière, Christian (1974). The Captive Dreamer. Translated by Stuart, Francis. New York: Saturday Review Press.
  - de La Mazière, Christian (1975). Ashes of Honour. Translated by Stuart, Francis. London: Wingate.
- de La Mazière, Christian (2003). Le Rêveur blessé (in French). Éditions de Fallois.
