= John Hind Farmer =

John Hind Farmer, MC, TD
- John Farmer in later years
- Born: 12 January 1917; London, England
- Died: 29 October 2012 (aged 95); Saint-Julien-en-Genevois, France
- Known for: French Resistance, MI6

John Hind Farmer, MC, TD, (1917–2012) was a member of the Special Operations Executive (SOE) during the Second World War. He was head of the FREELANCE network active in Auvergne from May to June 1944. Subsequently he worked for MI6 and is said to have been involved in a British plot to assassinate President Nasser of Egypt.

== Biography ==
John Farmer was born in London on 12 January 1917 and educated in Germany and Switzerland as well as the Jesuit College at Godinne-sur-Meuse (now part of the commune of Yvoir) in Belgium. He continued his education at Beaumont College, Windsor, United Kingdom.

He won many awards for sprinting and hurdles both in and out of school and rugby was a passion for all his life. He was also an actor and dancer having danced in the role of Puck in a production of "A Midsummer Night's Dream" by the Bank of England.

=== Second World War ===
In 1939, when working in the Bank of England, he joined the Royal Artillery and was sent to an anti-aircraft battery on the Maginot Line. He was evacuated from Dunkirk then went to Yorkshire where he found life dull. In 1944 he volunteered for Special Forces and went into one of the new Jedburgh Units. During training however he was recruited by Colonel Maurice Buckmaster, head of “F” section of SOE.

On the night of 29 April 1944, Farmer, under the code name “Hubert” flew from RAF Tempsford in Bedfordshire and parachuted into France near Cosne-d'Allier accompanied by his courier Nancy Wake, code name "Hélène."

Their radio operator, Denis Rake, had been badly tortured on a previous mission so did not land with them as he was unable to use a parachute. Instead he arrived by Lysander two weeks later.

They were hidden by the family of Jean Villechenon at Cosne-d'Allier. Farmer’s role was to form the FREELANCE network and to make contact with Maurice Southgate, code name "Philippe", who was Head of the Hector Stationer network. On 1 May however, two days after their arrival, Southgate was arrested in Montluçon by German police and was deported to Buchenwald.

Led by Jean Antoine Llorca Villechenon, codenamed "Laurent", from Aydat (Puy-de-Dôme), they put themselves at the service of Colonel Émile Coulaudon (called “Gaspard”), Head of the Mouvements Unis de la Résistance (MUR) which was located at Ligonès Castle, in the commune of Ruynes-en-Margeride (Cantal) to direct the activities and supplies of some 20,000 men in the Chaudes-Aigues region. From 15 May 1944 Farmer was responsible for parachuting weapons to the Maquis in their Redoubt of La Truyère (Cantal). As a result of these activities, the Maquis groups posed such a serious threat to the Germans that on 21/22 June 1944 the Germans attacked the Redoubt with several infantry battalions supported by armoured cars, tanks, artillery, and aircraft.

Fighting was intense and the Maquis were forced to disperse into the hills. Farmer also had to withdraw and he became separated from Wake and Rake. He had to walk over 200 kilometres to find another radio operator who could request weapons to replace those lost.

Subsequently he organized the parachuting of arms to the Maquis in Allier in the Tronçay forest area and he also took part in the liberation of Montluçon. For this action he was awarded the Military Cross (MC).

=== Post-War ===
His wartime marriage to Alyson Impey was dissolved after the war and he married France Fisher in 1947 they separated but they remained in touch as they had 3 daughters. He later lived Margaret Steele in 1992 who died in 2012.

After the war Farmer joined MI6 serving in Brussels, Rome, Beirut, Vienna, and Paris. He could speak French and German fluently as well as having a good knowledge of Italian and Arabic. He worked with the CIA in their plot to overthrow Prime Minister Mohammed Mossadeq in Iran. He also worked with French intelligence leading up to the Suez Crisis.

According to André Gerolymatos in 1953 Farmer was introduced to Mahmud Khalil, head of the intelligence directorate of the Egyptian air force, at the Riviera Hotel in Beirut and handed over £1,000 to him with the promise of £100,000 in future for the purpose of organizing a coup or assassinating President Nasser. John Hind Farmer was caught by the Egyptian Mukhabarat and tortured.

In the 1960s Farmer moved to Paris where he worked in the visa section as a cover then, after retiring from MI6, became a consultant for Control Risks Group, a London risk assessment company. He lived in America, Beirut, Cyprus, and Istanbul before retiring to Geneva and subsequently to Pougny (Ain) in France.

He broadcast a daily morning international press review on the English language Radio 74 and became well known in the Geneva region.

He died aged 95 on 29 October 2012 at Saint-Julien-en-Genevois.

== Memberships ==
After the war Farmer was a member of the following organizations:

- National Federation of Free Resistance (Fédération Nationale Libre Résistance);
- Committee of the Union of the Resistance in Auvergne (CODURA) (Comité d'Union de la Résistance en Auvergne);
- Association of Resistance and the Maquis of Cantal (Association de la Résistance et des Maquis du Cantal);
- Federation of United Resistance Movements and the Maquis of Auvergne (Fédération des Mouvements Unis de la Résistance et des Maquis d'Auvergne).
- Cadets of the Auvergne Resistance (honorary member)
- Swiss branch of the Royal British Legion.

== Decorations ==
| Ribbon | Issuing authority | Description | Date awarded | Notes/citation |
|---|---|---|---|---|
| | United Kingdom | Military Cross (M.C.) | 21 June 1945 | |
| | United Kingdom | Territorial Decoration (T.D.) | | |
| | United Kingdom | Defence Medal | | |
| | United Kingdom | War Medal 1939-1945 | | |
| | France | Croix de Guerre 1939-1945 | | Awarded with a Bronze Palm |
| | France | Combatant's Cross | | |

== Sources ==
This article is based on the following sources:

- Daily Telegraph Obituary 29 November 2012
- La Montagne (in French)

== See also ==
- M. R. D. Foot, SOE in France. An account of the Work of the British Special Operations Executive in France, 1940–1944, London, Her Majesty's Stationery Office, 1966, 1968; Whitehall History Publishing, in association with Frank Cass, 2004, ISBN 978-0-415408004. The book presents the "official" British version of the history of SOE in France. An essential reference on the subject of the SOE in France.
- Lt. Col. E.G. Boxshall, Chronology of SOE operations with the resistance in France during world war II, 1960, a typescript (copy from the Pearl Witherington-Cornioley library, also available at the Valençay library). See Sheet 30B, FREELANCE-GASPARD CIRCUIT.
