= Denis Rake =

British secret agent (1901-1976)

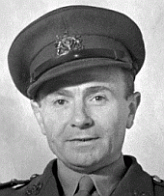
- Portrait of SOE operative Denis Rake circa 1939-1945
- Born: Denis Joseph Rake; 1901; Brussels, Belgium
- Died: September 1976 (aged 74–75); Kent, England
- Military career
- Allegiance: United Kingdom
- Branch: Special Operations Executive
- Service years: 1939-1945
- Rank: Major
- Unit: Special Operations Executive
- Conflicts: Second World War
- Awards: Military Cross; Croix de Guerre; Knight of the Legion of Honour
- Other work: maître d'hôtel to Douglas Fairbanks Jr.; memoirist

Denis Joseph Rake MC (1901-1976) was a British secret agent, serving as a radio operator with the Special Operations Executive during the Second World War. Sent to France, he was part of the Spruce and Privet networks with the codename 'Justin' in 1942 and the Freelance network with the codename 'Roland' in 1944. He also went by the codenames of 'Juniper', 'Receiver', 'Receveur' and 'Slacks' and the false identities of René Dieudonné and Denis Joseph Rocher, whilst fellow agent Nancy Wake nicknamed him 'Denden'. He held the rank of major by the war's end.

== Life ==
=== Before SOE ===
His mother was a French coloratura soprano at the Opéra de La Monnaie in Brussels, whilst his English father was a Times journalist. Rake was born in Brussels and aged three his mother entrusted him to the Sarazini circus, with which he criss-crossed Europe until the outbreak of the First World War, when they returned him to his parents. His father provided Edith Cavell's escape network with fake papers, escaping the roundup which led to her execution but dying shortly afterwards of tuberculosis in 1915.

After his father's death, Denis and his mother reached England, where he studied radio transmission. At the war's end he returned to Brussels. A British diplomat fell in love with him and in 1920 took him to Athens. After they separated, Rake had a liaison with a prince in the Greek royal family, who kept him until entering politics and finding that the relationship made the prince a target of the opposition press. Rake moved to Venice and in 1923 returned to England, appearing in musical comedies at the Theatre Royal Drury Lane from 1924 onwards, reaching his peak with the lead role in Mercenary Mary.

He was conscripted in 1939 and - with his perfect French - became an interpreter in Nantes. Despite being unable to swim, he survived the torpedoing of the RMS Lancastria on 18 June 1940 thanks to a friend pulling him from the water. The following month he was aboard the Free French minesweeper Pollux as an interpreter when she was sunk - he narrowly escaped with his life.

=== Return to France ===
SOE recruited him in 1942 and he accepted the training apart from the physical exercise. On the night of 13–14 May that year a felucca dropped him and Charles Hayes in a rubber dinghy off the coast of Antibes. Disappointed with the operation of the networks on the Côte d'Azur, he moved to Lyon and got in contact with Virginia Hall. He and Hall quickly understood each other and she housed him in a sex worker's house. However, there was not good reception for his radio there and he had to move. During the day he worked as a radio operator beside Edward Zeff ('Mathieu'), an operator for the 'Spruce' network, while in the evenings he was a singer in the cabaret at 'La Cigogne'. When he was stopped by a policeman one day and asked to open his case, he pretended to be a black marketeer and gave him a large bribe.

Rake met a young SOE agent recently parachuted into France at Hall's home, but the agent revealed to a collaborator relation in Lyon that he had come from London. That relation betrayed the agent, who under interrogation gave away Rake's name. Hall learned in late June that the Gestapo knew Rake's name and told him to return to London. Instead Rake suggested himself as radio operator to Edward Wilkinson, who was waiting in vain in Paris for one to be able to cross the demarcation line. Early in July Rake tried to cross the line near Montceau-les-Mines, but was stopped. He lost several teeth in his brutal initial Gestapo interrogation at Chalon-sur-Saône, but gave nothing away. One account states that he bribed a French guard and jumped off a train taking him to prison in Dijon, but according to Gilles Perrault the prison chaplain smuggled him out in a swill container with his ears and nose blocked with cotton wool.

=== Paris and Lyon ===
Reaching Paris, he went to the Bœuf sur le toit, which he had visited before the war (albeit in a different location). At the bar he met Max, a German Army staff officer based in the city, dressed in civilian dress, and became his lover. Next he met Wilkinson ('Alexandre'), who demanded he give up the relationship, something Rake refused to do. When a transmitter was delayed, Wilkinson decided to return to Lyon and - to go with him - Rake had to break up the relationship. They recrossed the demarcation line and reached Lyon on 15 July.

They moved in with Hall, who gave them a transmitter. Rake went down with dysentry and Hall hid him for a time before he returned to Paris. Wilkinson rejoined Richard Henry Heslop (a friend from training) and with Rake they decided to cross the demarcation line near Limoges. In that city Rake lived in a rented room at a café and the other two in a hotel, with the trio dining that day in the restaurant of the hôtel des Faisans. They would not tell Rake where they were staying and he thought they did not trust him. He did not turn up at that hotel on 15 August and - despite an SOE rule to continue as normal in that situation - the other two went looking for him and were arrested as soon as they went past that hotel a second time.

Rake had been arrested at a police checkpoint three hours earlier. Afraid of his landlady's curiosity, he had well-hidden his radio transmitter in the cloakroom at that hotel, but the policeman found 65,000 francs in his case, not pinned together in bundles of ten as was then usual. Heslop and Wilkinson claimed only to have met Rake the day before, but Rake's and Wilkinson's tickets had consecutive numbers and their identity cards were in the same handwriting despite claiming to be from different towns.

=== Castres and Spain ===
They were moved to Castres prison, with its isolation, deprivation and abuse - the prison escape at Mauzac-et-Grand-Castang on 16 July had led to surveillance being reinforced and thus Rake was separated from the other two and sent to a camp near Toulouse. On November 8 all three men were moved to Chambaran camp and three days later the German Army crossed the demarcation line. The head of the camp favoured the Allies and released all three men. With little money and no papers, Wilkinson and Heslop resumed their journey towards Angers but suspected Rake of having led to their arrest and so left him behind.

Rake managed to escape to Spain with two friends who did not speak French. He was placed in a Spanish internment camp, where he met a boy who showed him pictures of his family. Among them Rake spotted Wilkinson - the boy was his brother George Alfred Wilkinson. Rake was repatriated thanks to the British consulate.

=== 1944 and after ===
On the night of 9–10 May 1944 he was landed 2.5 km west-south-west of Luzillé by a Lysander (his 1942 injuries prevented him being parachuted in). He was now radio operator to the 'Freelance' network, based in Chaudes-Aigues, headed by Major John Hind Farmer and also including Nancy Wake. On 20 June he was wounded in a general attack by the Germans at Chaudes-Aigues and lost contact with his network. On 27 July he regained contact with Farmer, received a new codebook and set of radio crystals, and resumed his work as a radio operator.

He was presented with the Military Cross and the Croix de Guerre, along with being made a Knight of the Legion of Honour. After the war he became maître d'hôtel for Douglas Fairbanks Jr., wrote a memoir, and appeared in the 1969 documentary The Sorrow and the Pity. He died in Kent in September 1976.

== Bibliography ==
- (in French) Gilles Perrault, Les Jardins de l'Observatoire, Fayard, 1995. Cf. les chapitres 16 à 18.
- Richard Heslop (1970). Xavier : the famous British agent's dramatic account of his work in the French Resistance. London: Hart-Davis. ISBN 0-246-63989-X..
- Richards, Brooks (2001). Flottilles secrètes : les liaisons maritimes clandestines en France et en Afrique du Nord : 1940-1944 (in French). Translated by Pierrick Roullet. Le Touvet (Isère): Éditions Marcel-Didier Vrac (M.D.V.). ISBN 978-2-910821-41-8..
- Foot, Michael Richard Daniell; Jean-Louis Crémieux-Brilhac (2008). Des Anglais dans la Résistance: le service secret britannique d'action (SOE) en France, 1940-1944 (in French). Translated by Rachel Bouyssou. Paris: Tallandier. ISBN 978-2-84734-329-8.
  - translation of Foot, M. R. D. (2004). SOE in France an account of the work of the British Special Operations Executive in France, 1940-1944. London London Portland, OR: Whitehall History Pub. Frank Cass. ISBN 978-0-7146-5528-4., the official British account of SOE in France
- Vincent Nouzille (October 2007). L'espionne - Virginia Hall, une Américaine dans la guerre (in French). Paris: Fayard. ISBN 978-2-213-62827-1..
- Lt. Col. E.G. Boxshall, Chronology of SOE operations with the resistance in France during world war II, 1960, typed document (one copy in the library of Pearl Witherington-Cornioley, accessible in Valençay library). See sheet 12, TINKER CIRCUIT, and sheet 30B, FREELANCE-GASPARD CIRCUIT.
- Nancy Wake (2001). La Gestapo m'appelait la Souris blanche: une Australienne au secours de la France (in French). Paris: Éditions du Félin. ISBN 2-86645-402-2..
- Elliott, Geoffrey (2009). The Shooting Star - Denis Rake, MC : a Clandestine Hero of the Second World War. London: Methuen. ISBN 978-0-413-77684-6..
- Daniel Cordier (2009). Alias Caracalla (in French). Paris: Gallimard. pp. 277–278. ISBN 978-2-07-074311-7.
