= Nancy Wake =

Australian courier and SOE operative (1912–2011)

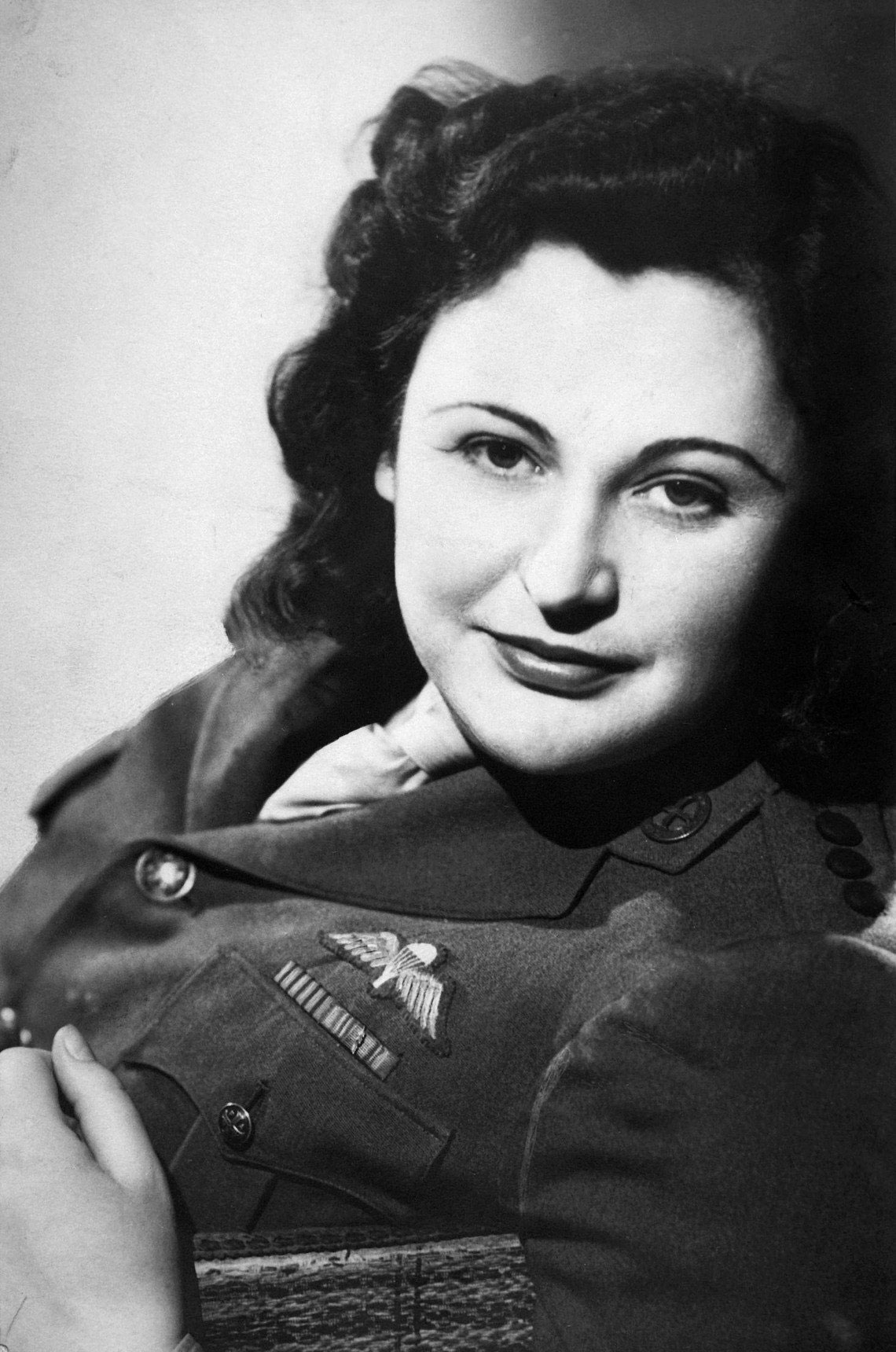
- Wake in 1945
- Born: 30 August 1912; Roseneath, Wellington, New Zealand
- Died: 7 August 2011 (aged 98); London, England
- Spouse(s): Henri Fiocca (d. 1943); John Forward
- Military career
- Allegiance: France; United Kingdom
- Branch: Special Operations Executive; First Aid Nursing Yeomanry
- Service years: 1943–1945 (SOE)
- Rank: Captain
- Nicknames: Hélène (SOE); Andrée (French Resistance/SOE Identity); White Mouse (Gestapo in France)
- Unit: Freelance
- Conflicts: Second World War
- Awards: Companion of the Order of Australia; George Medal; Officer of the Legion of Honour (France); Croix de guerre (France); Médaille de la Résistance (France); Medal of Freedom (United States); RSA Badge in Gold (New Zealand)

Nancy Grace Augusta Wake, AC, GM (30 August 1912 – 7 August 2011), also known as Madame Fiocca and Nancy Fiocca, was a New Zealand-born Australian nurse and journalist who joined the French Resistance and later the Special Operations Executive (SOE) during World War II, and briefly pursued a postwar career as an intelligence officer in the Air Ministry.

The official historian of the SOE, M. R. D. Foot, said that "her irrepressible, infectious, high spirits were a joy to everyone who worked with her." Many stories about her World War II activities come from her autobiography, The White Mouse, and are not verifiable from other sources.

Born in Wellington, New Zealand, Wake grew up in Sydney, New South Wales, Australia. By the 1930s, Wake was living in Marseille with her French industrialist husband, Henri Fiocca, when the war broke out. After the fall of France to Nazi Germany in 1940, Wake became a courier for the Pat O'Leary escape network led by Ian Garrow and, later, Albert Guérisse. As a member of the escape network, she helped Allied airmen evade capture by the Germans and escape to neutral Spain. In 1943, when the Germans became aware of her, she escaped to Spain and then went to the United Kingdom. Her husband was captured and executed.

After reaching Britain, Wake joined the Special Operations Executive (SOE) under the code name "Hélène". On 29–30 April 1944 as a member of a three-person SOE team code-named "Freelance", Wake parachuted into the Allier department of occupied France to liaise between the SOE and several Maquis groups in the Auvergne region, which were loosely overseen by Émile Coulaudon (code name "Gaspard"). She participated in a battle between the Maquis and a large German force in June 1944. In the aftermath of the battle, a defeat for the Maquis, she claimed to have bicycled 500 kilometers to send a situation report to SOE in London.

Wake was a recipient of the George Medal from the United Kingdom (17 July 1945), the Medal of Freedom from the United States (1947), the Légion d'honneur from France (1970: Knight; 1988: Officer), a Companion of the Order of Australia from Australia (22 February 2004), and the Badge in Gold from New Zealand (2006).

== Early life and education ==
Born in Roseneath, Wellington, New Zealand, on 30 August 1912, Wake was the youngest of six children. She was Māori through her great-grandmother Pourewa, believed to be of the Ngāti Māhanga iwi, who was reportedly one of the first Māori women to marry a European. In 1914, her family moved to Australia and settled at North Sydney. Shortly thereafter, her father, Charles Augustus Wake, returned to New Zealand and her mother, Ella Wake (née Rosieur; 1874–1968) raised the children.

In Sydney, Wake attended the North Sydney Household Arts (Home Science) School. At the age of 16, she ran away from home and worked as a nurse. With £200 (1928 currency) she had inherited from an aunt, she journeyed to New York City, then London where she trained herself as a journalist.

In the 1930s, she worked in Paris and later for Hearst newspapers as a European correspondent. She witnessed the rise of Adolf Hitler and the Nazi movement and "saw roving Nazi gangs randomly beating Jewish men and women in the streets" of Vienna.

== The Pat O'Leary Line ==
In 1937, Wake met wealthy French industrialist Henri Edmond Fiocca (1898–1943), whom she married on 30 November 1939. She was living in Marseille when Germany invaded. During the war in France, Wake served as an ambulance driver. After the fall of France in 1940, she joined the escape network of Captain Ian Garrow, which became the Pat O'Leary Line. In reference to Wake's ability to elude capture, the Gestapo called her the "White Mouse." The Resistance exercised caution with her missions; her life was in constant danger, with the Gestapo tapping her telephone and intercepting her mail.

I don’t see why we women should just wave our men a proud goodbye and then knit them balaclavas.

— Nancy Wake

In November 1942, Wehrmacht troops occupied Vichy France after the Allies' Operation Torch had started. This gave the Germans and the Gestapo unrestricted access to all parts of Vichy France and made life more dangerous for Wake. When the network was betrayed that same year she decided to flee France. Her husband, Henri Fiocca, stayed behind. He was later captured, tortured, and executed by the Gestapo. Wake described her tactics: "A little powder and a little drink on the way, and I'd pass their (German) posts and wink and say, 'Do you want to search me?' God, what a flirtatious little bastard I was."

In early 1943, in the process of getting out of France, Wake was picked up with a whole trainload of people and was arrested in Toulouse, but was released four days later. The head of the O'Leary Line, Albert Guérisse, managed to have her released by claiming she was his mistress and was trying to conceal her infidelity to her husband (all of which was untrue). She succeeded in crossing the Pyrenees to Spain. Until the war ended, she was unaware of her husband's death, and she subsequently blamed herself for it.

== SOE ==
Most of the operations of Wake's SOE group were in or near Allier Department.

After reaching Britain, Wake joined the Special Operations Executive and was trained in several programs. Vera Atkins, who was the senior female in the SOE overseeing the agents going into France, recalls her as "a real Australian bombshell. Tremendous vitality, flashing eyes. Everything she did, she did well." Training reports record that she was "a very good and fast shot" and possessed excellent fieldcraft. She was noted to "put the men to shame by her cheerful spirit and strength of character."

On 29–30 April 1944, as part of the three-person "Freelance" team headed by John Hind Farmer (code name "Hubert"), Wake parachuted into Auvergne province, France. Resistance leader Henri Tardivat discovered Wake tangled in a tree. He remarked, "I hope that all the trees in France bear such beautiful fruit this year," to which she replied, "Cut out that bullshit and get me out of this tree." Denis Rake, a radio operator, was the third member of the team.

The team was to be a liaison between London and the local maquis group headed by Émile Coulaudon (Gaspard). The team's initial relationship with Gaspard was frosty. He wanted money and arms from the allies but was not cooperative until the French Forces of the Interior in London, the umbrella organization for the disparate resistance groups in France, instructed him to cooperate. SOE began sending in large amounts of arms, equipment, and money.

Wake's duties were pinpointing locations at which the material and money were parachuted in, collecting it, and allocating it among the maquis, including pay to individual soldiers. Wake carried with her a list of the targets the maquis were to destroy before the invasion of France by the Allies (which would take place on 6 June). The destruction of communication lines and other facilities throughout France would hinder the German response to the invasion.

Disaster. The reach of the maquis exceeded their grasp. On 20 May, Couloudon declared a general mobilization of resistance fighters, collecting in total about 7,000 men divided into three groups. His objective was to demonstrate that the resistance was able to liberate areas from the Germans with its own forces. On 2 June, the Germans launched a probing attack on Couloudon's base at Mont Mouchet; on 10 June the Germans launched a larger attack, and on 20 June encircled Couloudon's positions and forced the resistance fighters to flee after taking heavy casualties. Wake and the members of her team accompanied groups of maquis in a three-day 150 kilometres (93 miles), retreat westward to the village of Saint-Santin.

The bicycle ride. During the flight from the Germans, Rake, the radio operator, had left his radio and codes behind and the SOE team needed to be in contact with London. The nearest SOE radio and operator were in Châteauroux, Wake said she borrowed a bicycle and rode it to Châteauroux, found a radio near there, updated London on the situation, and then bicycled back to Saint-Santin, traveling 500 kilometres (310 miles) in 72 hours. Fortunately for her, there were few Germans in the areas through which she bicycled.

With Henri Tardivat. After her bicycle ride, the Freelance team, with another recently arrived operator named Roger, a 19-year-old American marine, returned to Allier Department to join the resistance group of Henri Tardivat (who discovered her tangled in a tree when she parachuted in). In July two more Americans, Reeve Schley and John deKoven Alsop, joined their team as instructors. Neither spoke much French and Schley was nearly blind if not wearing his thick-lensed eyeglasses, but he impressed the maquisards with his immaculately tailored military uniform. Both proved to be effective instructors. Wake said that she and Tardivat initiated a series of attacks on German convoys and fought off an attack on their camp by the Germans in which seven French maquisards were killed. Her principal job, however, continued to be to organize the reception and distribution of arms and material for the resistance groups which was parachuted into Allier nearly every other night.

Wake claimed that she participated in a raid (not confirmed by other sources) that destroyed the Gestapo headquarters in Montluçon, killing 38 Germans. At one point Wake said she discovered that the men were using three girls as prostitutes and mistreating them. She coerced the maquis to release the women, to whom she provided a wash and new clothes. Nancy Wake set two of the girls free, but she suspected that a third was a German spy. After interrogating and exposing her, Wake ordered the resistance group to shoot the informer. They did not have the heart to kill her in cold blood, but when Wake insisted that she would perform the execution, they capitulated. Nancy Wake claimed that the spy girl spat and stripped naked in front of her before facing the firing squad. Wake showed no regrets for the execution. Wake also said that she killed an SS sentry with her bare hands to prevent him from raising the alarm during a raid.

During a 1990s television interview, when asked what had happened to the sentry who spotted her, Wake simply drew her finger across her throat. "They'd taught this judo-chop stuff with the flat of the hand at SOE, and I practised away at it. But this was the only time I used it – whack – and it killed him all right. I was really surprised."

After the invasion of southern France by American military forces on 15 August, the Resistance groups harried the retreating Germans. Her friend Tardivat was badly wounded and would lose a leg to amputation. During a victory celebration in Vichy, Wake learnt of the death of her husband. In mid-September, she and other members of the Freelance team, their job completed, returned to Great Britain.

== Postwar ==
Immediately after the war, Wake was awarded the George Medal, the United States Medal of Freedom, the Médaille de la Résistance, and thrice, the Croix de Guerre. She worked for the intelligence department at the British Air Ministry, attached to embassies in Paris and Prague.

Nancy Wake with war souvenirs, Sydney, New South Wales, 1950

Nancy Wake running for election, Sydney, New South Wales, 1951

Wake stood as a Liberal candidate in the 1949 Australian federal election for the Sydney seat of Barton, running against Dr. Herbert Evatt, then deputy prime minister, attorney general, and minister for external affairs in the Ben Chifley Labor government. While Chifley lost government to Robert Menzies, Wake recorded a 13 per cent swing against Evatt, with Evatt retaining the seat with 53.2 per cent of the vote. Wake ran against Evatt again at the 1951 federal election. By this time, Evatt was deputy leader of the opposition. The result was extremely close; however, Evatt retained the seat with a margin of fewer than 250 votes. Evatt slightly increased his margin at subsequent elections before relocating to the safer seat of Hunter by 1958.

Wake left Australia just after the 1951 election and moved back to England. She worked as an intelligence officer in the department of the Assistant Chief of the Air Staff at the Air Ministry in Whitehall. She resigned in 1957 after marrying an RAF officer, John Forward, in December of that year. They relocated to Australia in the early 1960s. Maintaining her interest in politics, Wake was endorsed as a Liberal candidate at the 1966 federal election for the Sydney seat of Kingsford Smith. Despite recording a swing of 6.9 per cent against the sitting Labor member Daniel Curtin, Wake was again unsuccessful. Around 1985, Wake and John Forward left Sydney to retire to Port Macquarie.

In 1985, Wake published her autobiography, The White Mouse. Later, after 40 years of marriage, her second husband John Forward died at Port Macquarie on 19 August 1997. The couple had no children. She sold her medals to fund herself, saying, "There was no point in keeping them, I'll probably go to hell and they'd melt anyway." In 2001, Wake left Australia for the last time and emigrated to London.

She became a resident at The Stafford hotel in St James' Place, Piccadilly, formerly a British and American forces club during the war. She had been introduced to her first "bloody good drink" there by the general manager at the time, Louis Burdet. He also had worked for the Resistance in Marseille. In the mornings she would usually be found in the hotel bar, sipping her first gin and tonic of the day and telling war stories. She was welcomed at the hotel, celebrating her 90th birthday there. The hotel owners absorbed most of the costs of her stay. In 2003, Wake chose to move to the Royal Star and Garter Home for Disabled Ex-Service Men and Women, in Richmond, London, where she remained until her death.

Wake died on 7 August 2011, aged 98, at Kingston Hospital after being admitted with a chest infection. She had requested that her ashes be scattered at Montluçon in central France. Her ashes were scattered near the village of Verneix, which is near Montluçon, on 11 March 2013. Her obituary was included in (and inspired the title for) The Socialite Who Killed A Nazi With Her Bare Hands: And 144 Other Fascinating People Who Died This Year, a collection of New York Times obituaries published in 2012.

== Honours ==
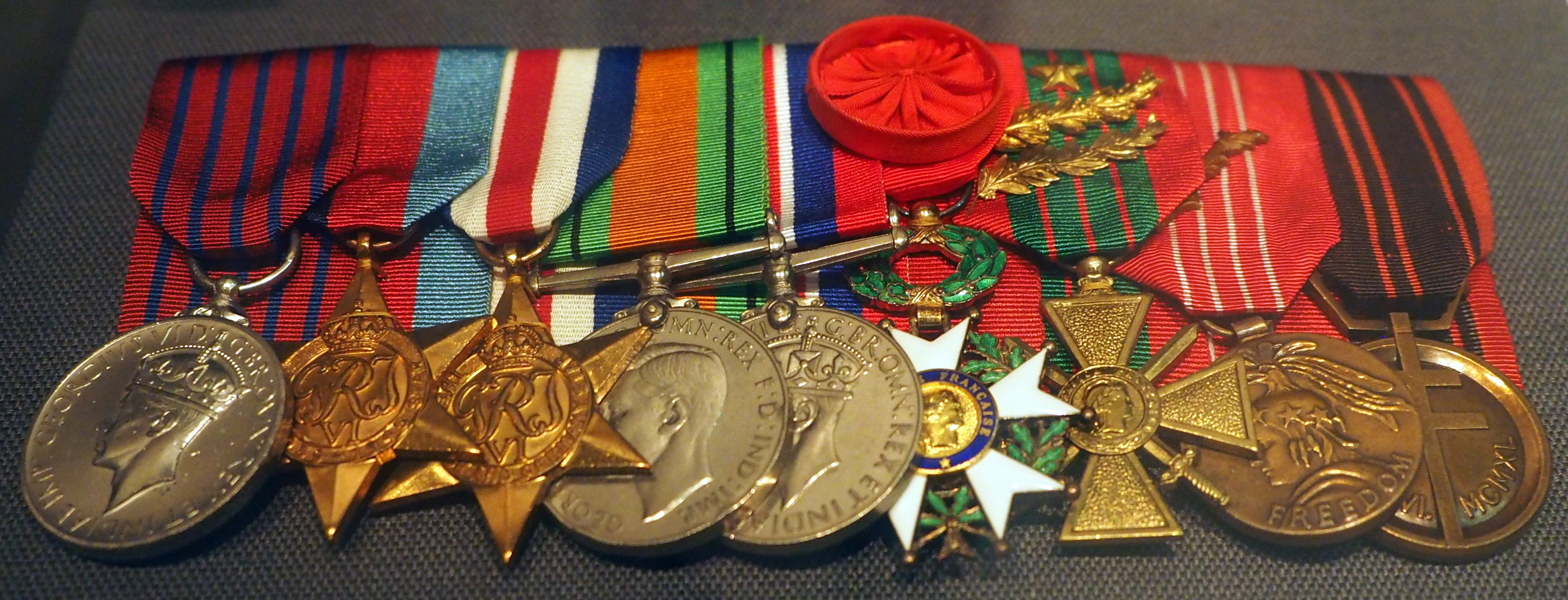
The medals awarded to Wake for her World War II service on display at the Australian War Memorial

Wake was appointed a Chevalier (knight) of the Legion of Honour in 1970 and was promoted to Officer of the Legion of Honour in 1988. Shortly after the war, she was recommended for decorations in Australia but was turned down. Decades later, Australia offered to award her medals but she refused, saying: "The last time there was a suggestion of that I told the government they could stick their medals where the monkey stuck his nuts. The thing is if they gave me a medal now, it wouldn't be love so I don't want anything from them."

In February 2004, Wake was made a Companion of the Order of Australia. In April 2006, she was awarded the Royal New Zealand Returned and Services' Association's highest honour, the RSA Badge in Gold. Wake's medals are on display in the Second World War gallery at the Australian War Memorial in Canberra. On 3 June 2010, a "heritage pylon" paying tribute to Wake was unveiled on Oriental Parade in Wellington, New Zealand, near the place of her birth.

Minor planet 17038 Wake was named after her.

=== List of honours ===
Ribbon	Issuing authority	Description	Date awarded	Notes/citation
Ribbon of the AC	Commonwealth of Australia	Companion of the Order of Australia	22 February 2004	The award recognises the significant contribution and commitment of Nancy Wake, stemming from her outstanding actions in wartime, in encouraging community appreciation and understanding of the past sacrifices made by Australian men and women in times of conflict, and to a lasting legacy of peace.
Ribbon of the GM	United Kingdom	George Medal	17 July 1945	Special operations in France "For brave conduct in hazardous circumstances"
Ribbon of the 1939–1945 Star	United Kingdom	1939–1945 Star		
Ribbon of the France & Germany Star	United Kingdom	France and Germany Star		
Ribbon of the Defence Medal	United Kingdom	Defence Medal		
Ribbon of the War Medal	United Kingdom	War Medal 1939–1945		
Ribbon of the Legion of Honor – Chevalier	French Republic	Chevalier de la Légion d'Honneur	1970	
Ribbon of the Legion of Honor – Officier	French Republic	Officier de la Légion d'Honneur	1988	
Ribbon de la croix de guerre	French Republic	Croix de Guerre		with two Palms and a Star
Ribbon of the PMOF	United States of America	Medal of Freedom		with Bronze Palm. (Only 987 issued with Bronze Palm during WWII)
Ribbon de la Médaille de la Résistance	French Republic	Médaille de la Résistance		
	New Zealand	Badge in Gold	15 November 2006	Royal New Zealand Returned and Services' Association

== Biographies ==
Nancy Wake 1951 SLNSW FL18933588 (cropped)

In 1956, Australian author Russell Braddon wrote Nancy Wake: The Story of a Very Brave Woman (ISBN 978-0-7524-5485-6). A copy of the book, dedicated to Major Denis Rake MC who worked with Nancy Wake in the SOE undercover in France, was auctioned in 2022, in the same auction of Wake's medals. Nancy Wake wrote her own account (first published 1985) with the original title, The White Mouse ("The autobiography of the woman the Gestapo called the White Mouse") (ISBN 0-7251-0755-3). In 2001, Australian author Peter FitzSimons wrote Nancy Wake, A Biography of Our Greatest War Heroine (ISBN 0 7322 6919 9), a bestselling comprehensive biography of Wake. In 2011, German author Michael Jürgs wrote Codename Hélène: Churchills Geheimagentin Nancy Wake und ihr Kampf gegen die Gestapo in Frankreich (translated: Codename Hélène: Churchill's secret agent Nancy Wake and her fight against the Gestapo in France). The book was published in October 2012. In 2020, Simon and Schuster published Ariel Lawhon's Code Name Helene, a fictionalisation of Wake's exploits.

Claims that Sebastian Faulks' 1999 novel Charlotte Gray is based on Wake's war-time exploits, as well as those of Pearl Cornioley, a British secret-service agent were rejected by the author. Faulks said, "The truth about Charlotte Gray is that she was entirely invented. That's the way good novelists work". Wake was also featured in a 2012 article in Military Officer.

== Portrayals ==
An Australian television mini-series was released in 1987 entitled Nancy Wake, which is based on the 1956 biography by Russell Braddon. It was released as True Colors in the US. Wake was played by Australian actress Noni Hazlehurst and Wake herself made a cameo appearance in the role of Madame Fouret. Wake also was made a consultant for the film but only after the script had been written. She criticised the script upon reading it, and she did so again at the launch of the mini-series. Wake was disappointed that the film was changed from an eight-hour resistance story to a four-hour love story. The producers said that they did not have the budget for the longer version and that it was difficult to cover all Wake's exploits in the reduced time frame. Wake also candidly criticized aspects that she felt were not a true depiction of events, and continued for the rest of her life to criticize the script. Similarly, Seasons 1 and 2 of the late 1980s British television series Wish Me Luck were based on her exploits and much of the dialogue was copied from her autobiography. Rachael Blampied portrayed Nancy Wake in the 2014 TVNZ docu-drama Nancy Wake: The White Mouse.

In 2002, Melissa Beowulf's portrait of Wake was a finalist in the Doug Moran National Portrait Prize. It was later acquired by the National Portrait Gallery. Beowulf chose Wake as a subject to help ensure she received greater recognition within Australia.

Christine Croydon's Underground, a play reviewing Wake's life opened at The Gasworks Theatre in Melbourne in March 2019.

In 2019, the book Liberation, a historical novel based on the events of Wake's wartime service, was released. Written by Imogen Kealey, the book's dust jacket from the Grand Central Publishing edition released in April 2020 mentions that the story is in development as a "major motion picture."

On 27 August 2020, it was announced that Elizabeth Debicki would star and executive produce a limited series about Wake titled Code Name Hélène, based on Ariel Lawhon's novel of the same name.
