= Bernadette Devlin McAliskey =

Irish socialist and republican political activist (born 1947)

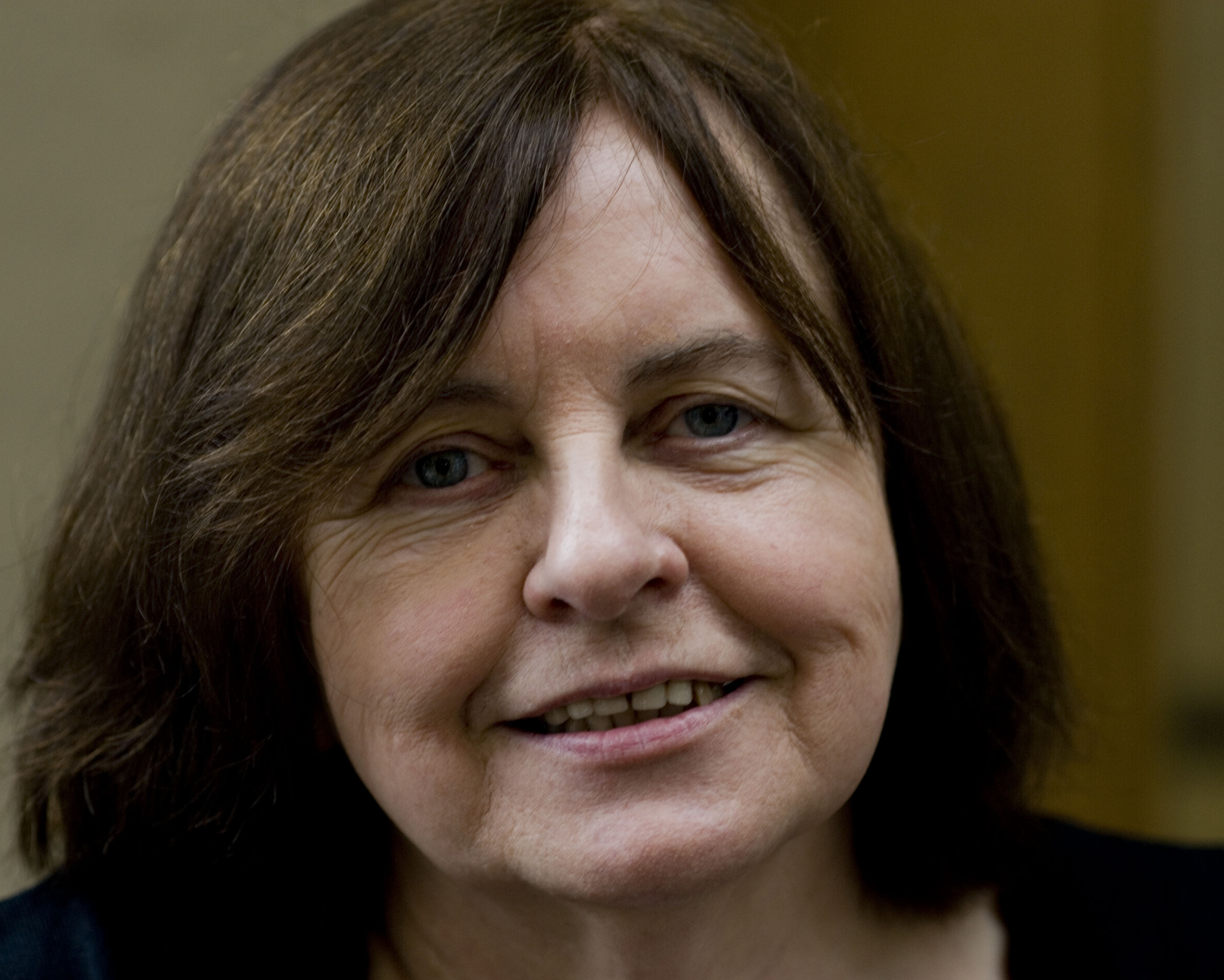
- McAliskey in 2011

Member of Parliament for Mid Ulster
- In office 17 April 1969 – 8 February 1974
- Preceded by: George Forrest
- Succeeded by: John Dunlop

Personal details
- Born: Josephine Bernadette Devlin; 23 April 1947 (age 79) Cookstown, County Tyrone, Northern Ireland
- Party: Independent Republican (1970–1974), (1976–1977), (1978–present)
- Other political affiliations: Unity (1969–1970), Irish Republican Socialist Party (1974–1976), Independent Socialist Party (1977–1978)
- Spouse: Michael McAliskey
- Children: Róisín McAliskey
- Education: Queen's University Belfast

Josephine Bernadette McAliskey (née Devlin; born 23 April 1947), usually known as Bernadette Devlin or Bernadette McAliskey, is an Irish civil rights leader and former politician. She served as the Member of Parliament (MP) for Mid Ulster in Northern Ireland from a 1969 by-election until February 1974. McAliskey came to national and international prominence at the age of 21 when she became the youngest woman ever (at that time) to become a British Member of Parliament. McAliskey broke with the traditional Irish republican policy of abstentionism and took her seat in Westminster.

McAliskey's term as an MP began at the outbreak of the Troubles, the ethno-nationalist conflict which would come to dominate Northern Ireland for the next 30 years. For the majority of that time, McAliskey was politically active, advocating for a 32-county socialist Irish republic to replace the two states on the island of Ireland. Originally linked to the People's Democracy group, McAliskey was later a founder of the Irish Republican Socialist Party. However, McAliskey left the party after a year when members voted that its paramilitary wing, the Irish National Liberation Army, did not have to obey the political wing.

McAliskey continued to be politically active, such as during the 1981 Irish hunger strike. It was during this period when she and her husband survived an assassination attempt by undercover members of the Ulster Defence Association, an Ulster loyalist paramilitary. She was shot nine times by gunmen in front of her children before being taken by helicopter to hospital for emergency treatment.

Since 1997 McAliskey has worked as the head of the South Tyrone Empowerment Programme, an NGO based in Dungannon which focuses on community development.

== Early life ==
Devlin was born in Cookstown, County Tyrone, to a Catholic family, where she was the third of six children born to John James and Elizabeth Bernadette Devlin. Her father raised her to hold Irish Republican ideals before he died when Bernadette was nine years old. Subsequently, the family had to depend on welfare to survive, an experience which affected Bernadette deeply. Bernadette's mother died when Bernadette was nineteen years old, leaving her to partially raise her siblings while also attending university.

She attended St Patrick's Girls Academy in Dungannon. She was studying psychology at Queen's University Belfast in 1968 when she took a prominent role in a student-led civil rights organisation, People's Democracy. Following complaints from Unionist politicians, Devlin's scholarship was revoked and she was refused to be allowed to sit her final exams. Queen's University has never offered a formal apology to Devlin, but Devlin has stated she would not accept one even if it was offered.

== Political activism ==
=== Political beginnings ===
She stood unsuccessfully against James Chichester-Clark in the 1969 Northern Ireland general election. When George Forrest, the MP for Mid Ulster, died, she fought the subsequent by-election on the "Unity" ticket, defeating the Ulster Unionist Party candidate, Forrest's widow Anna, and was elected to the Westminster Parliament. Aged 21, she was the youngest MP at the time, and remained the youngest woman ever elected to Westminster until the May 2015 general election when 20-year-old Mhairi Black was elected.

Devlin stood on the slogan "I will take my seat and fight for your rights" – signalling her rejection of the traditional Irish republican principle of abstentionism. On 22 April 1969, the day before her 22nd birthday, she swore the Oath of Allegiance and made her maiden speech within an hour.

In June 1969, in an interview published by the Italian weekly l'Opinione, Devlin described People's Democracy as a movement seeking to organise the working class across religious divisions. She stated that it was neither an instrument of the IRA nor immediately aimed at Irish reunification. She stressed the need to extend the mobilisation for civil rights and social justice to the Protestant working class, and said that she sought to contribute to the building of a socialist society while rejecting doctrinaire socialism.

=== Battle of the Bogside ===
After engaging, on the side of the residents, in the Battle of the Bogside in August, she was convicted of incitement to riot in December 1969, for which she served six months imprisonment. After being re-elected at the 1970 general election, Devlin declared that she would sit in Parliament as an independent socialist.

=== US tour and meetings with Black Panthers ===
Devlin in a 1971 newsreel film about the Troubles.

Almost immediately after the Battle of the Bogside, Devlin undertook a tour of the United States in August 1969, a trip which generated a significant amount of media attention. She met with members of the Black Panther Party in Watts, Los Angeles and gave them her support. She made appearances on Meet the Press and The Tonight Show Starring Johnny Carson. At a number of speaking events, she made parallels between the struggle in the US by African Americans seeking civil rights and Catholics in Northern Ireland, sometimes to the embarrassment of her audience. During an event in Philadelphia, she had to goad an African American singer to sing "We Shall Overcome" to the Irish-American audience, many of whom refused to stand for the song. In Detroit, she refused to take the stage until African Americans, who were barred from the event, were allowed in. In New York, Mayor John Lindsay arranged a ceremony to present Devlin with a key to the city of New York. Devlin, frustrated with conservative elements of the Irish-American community, left the tour to return to Northern Ireland and, believing the freedom of New York should go to the American poor, sent Eamonn McCann to present the key on her behalf to a representative from the Harlem chapter of the Black Panther Party.

In September 1969, while still on tour, the Unionist Stratton Mills dubbed Devlin "nothing less than Fidel Castro in a miniskirt". Devlin responded by stating that Mills was a coward for waiting until she was abroad to make such a remark, but also that she was "as left as James Connolly and the starry plough". The two had a face-to-face debate in New York that month.

=== Bloody Sunday ===
Having witnessed the Bloody Sunday massacre in Derry in 1972, Devlin was infuriated that she was later consistently denied the floor in the House of Commons by the Speaker Selwyn Lloyd, despite the fact that parliamentary convention decreed that any Member of Parliament witnessing an incident under discussion would be granted an opportunity to speak about it.

The day following Bloody Sunday, Devlin slapped Conservative Home Secretary Reginald Maudling across the face when he falsely asserted in the House of Commons that the Parachute Regiment had fired in self-defence on Bloody Sunday. Asked if she intended to apologise to Maudling, Devlin said: "I'm just sorry I didn't get him by the throat".

Thirteen years later, former British Prime Minister Edward Heath recalled the event: "I remember very well when an Hon. Lady rushed from the Opposition Benches and hit Mr. Maudling. I remember that vividly because I thought that she was going to hit me. She could not stretch as far as that, so she had to make do with him."

Devlin appeared on Firing Line in 1972 to discuss the situation in Northern Ireland. In the same year she campaigned for a 'No' vote in the referendum regarding the Republic of Ireland's entry into the European Economic Community.

=== Irish Republican Socialist Party ===
Devlin helped to form the Irish Republican Socialist Party (IRSP) with Seamus Costello in 1974. This was a revolutionary socialist breakaway from Official Sinn Féin and, later that same day, Costello also created the Irish National Liberation Army (INLA) as a split from the Official Irish Republican Army. Devlin did not join the INLA and while she served on the party's national executive in 1975, she resigned when a proposal that the INLA become subordinate to the party executive was defeated. In 1977, she joined the Independent Socialist Party, but it disbanded the following year.

=== Support for prisoners ===
McAliskey stood as an independent candidate in support of the prisoners on the blanket protest and dirty protest at Long Kesh prison in the 1979 elections to the European Parliament in the Northern Ireland constituency, and won 5.9% of the vote. She was a leading spokesperson for the Smash H-Block Campaign, which supported the hunger strikes in 1980 and 1981.

In September 1981 McAliskey toured continental Europe to try and raise support for the strikers. She was deported from Spain immediately upon arrival at Barcelona airport. Instead, McAliskey flew to Paris and called upon French Trade Unions to place an embargo on handling British goods until the hunger strikes ended.

=== Attempted assassination ===
On 16 January 1981, Devlin and her husband were attacked by members of the Ulster Freedom Fighters, a cover name of the Ulster Defence Association (UDA), who broke into their home near Coalisland, County Tyrone. The gunmen shot Devlin nine times in front of her children.

British soldiers were watching the McAliskey home at the time, but they failed to prevent the assassination attempt. Allegations were subsequently made that elements of the security forces had colluded with the UDA in planning the botched assassination. An army patrol from 3 Para entered the house after waiting outside for half an hour. Devlin has claimed that the patrol "were there to make sure that the gunmen got into my house and that they were caught on the way out." Soldiers from the Argyll and Sutherland Highlanders (ASH) then arrived and transported her by helicopter to a nearby hospital.

The paramilitaries had torn out the telephone and, while the wounded couple were being given first aid by the newly arrived troops, an ASH soldier ran to a neighbour's house, commandeered a car, and drove to the home of a councillor to telephone for help. The couple were taken by helicopter to hospital in nearby Dungannon for emergency treatment and then to the Musgrave Park Hospital, Military Wing, in Belfast, under intensive care.

The attackers—Ray Smallwoods (32), Tom Graham (38), both from Lisburn, and Andrew Watson (25) from Seymour Hill, Dunmurry—were captured by the army patrol and subsequently jailed. All three were members of the South Belfast UDA. Smallwoods was the driver of the getaway car.

=== Dáil Éireann elections ===
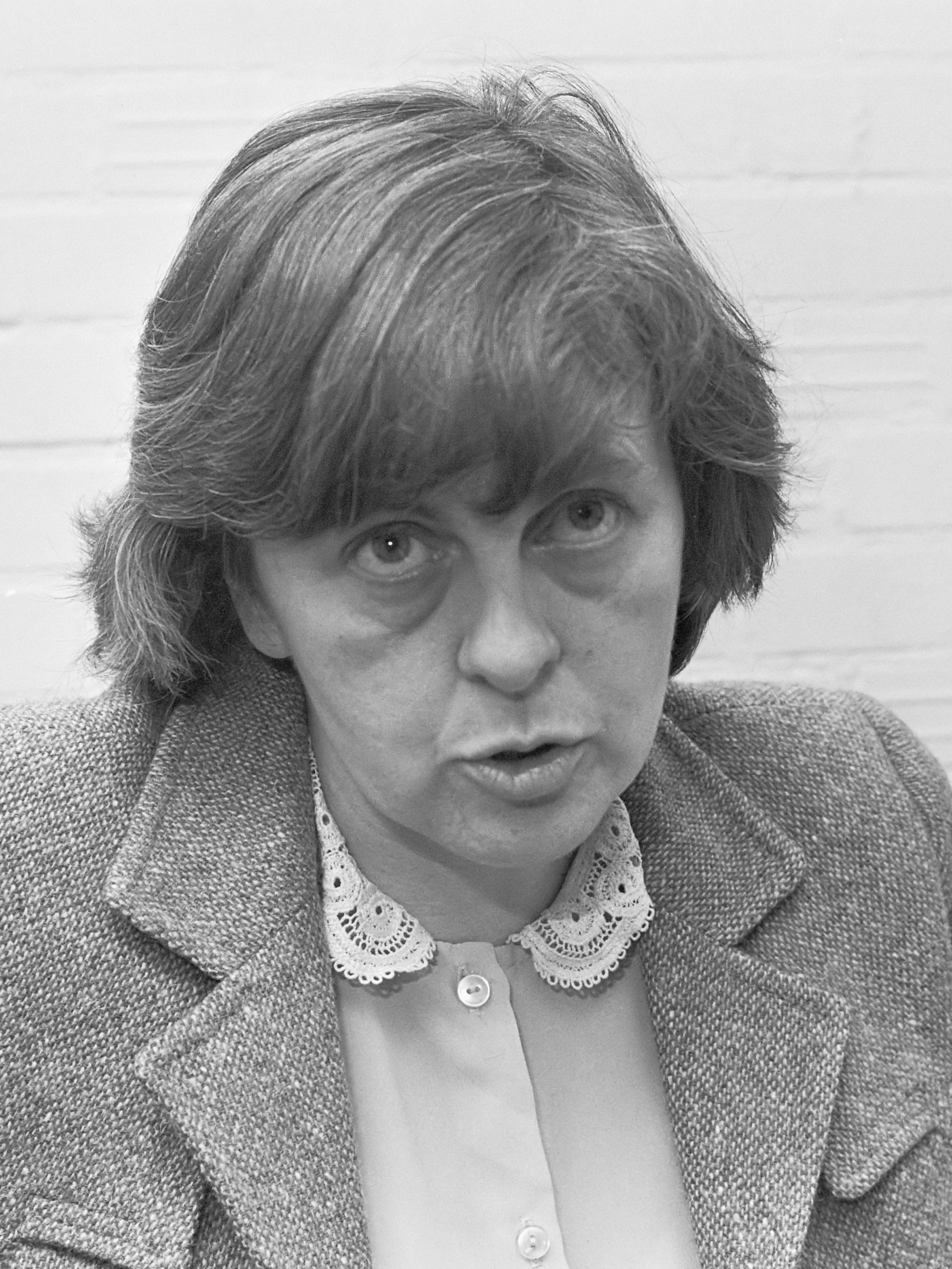
Devlin McAliskey in 1986

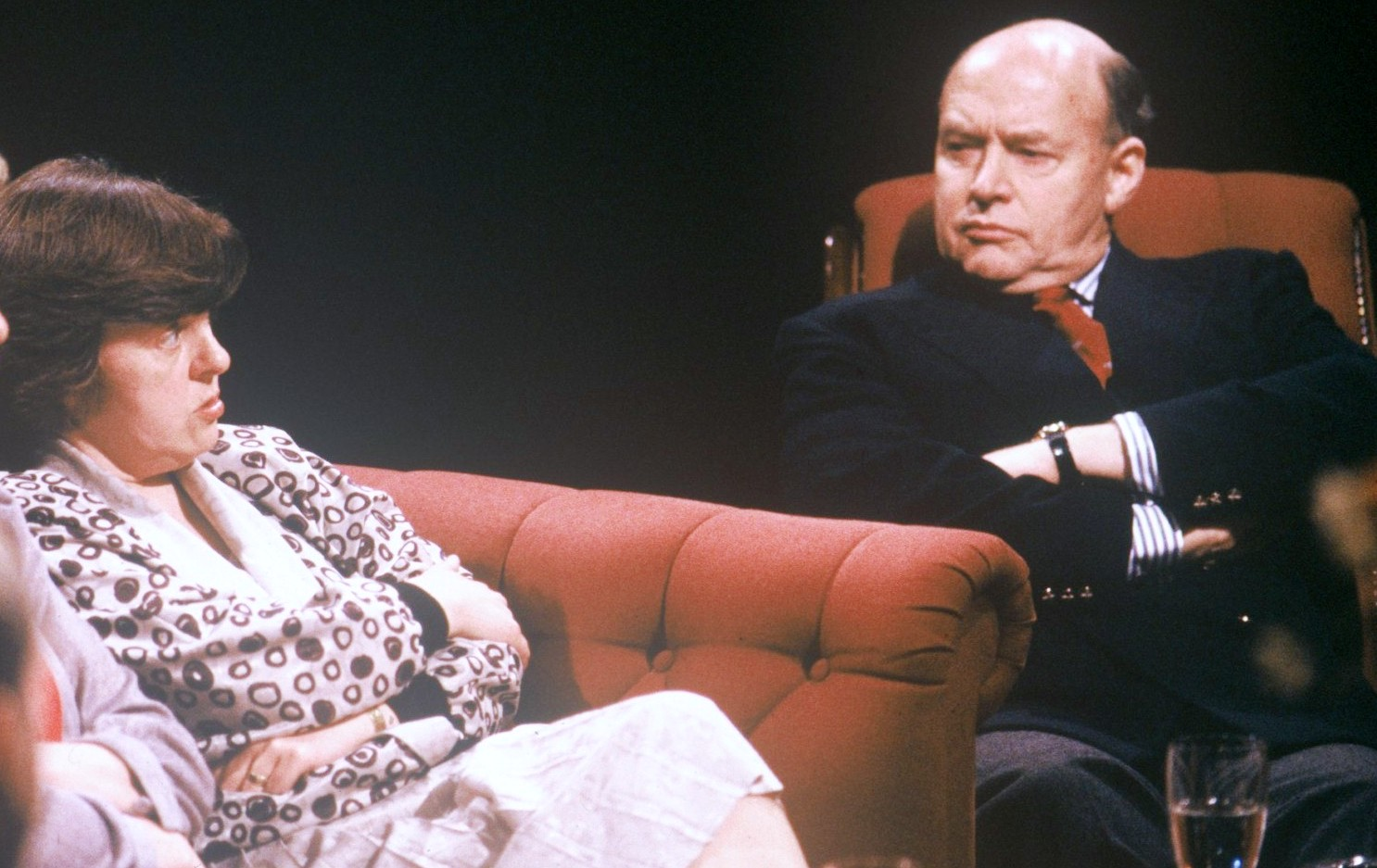
With Anthony Farrar-Hockley on After Dark in 1988: Licence to Kill?

She twice failed, in February and November 1982, in attempts to be elected in Dáil Éireann for Dublin North-Central.

=== Funeral of Dominic McGlinchey ===
In 1994, McAliskey attended the funeral of former Irish National Liberation Army Chief of Staff Dominic McGlinchey. The INLA had been the armed wing of the Irish Republican Socialist Party, which McAliskey had helped found. McAliskey kissed the coffin, which was carried by her, Sean McGlinchey, Dominic Jr., and Father O'Daly, who had given McGlinchey the last rites on Hardman's Gardens. During the funeral oration, she condemned the recent press coverage which had accused McGlinchey of drug dealing and criminality and said of the journalists responsible that they were "curs and dogs. May every one of them rot in hell. They have taken away Dominic McGlinchy's character and they will stand judgement for it. He was the finest Republican of them all. He never dishonoured the cause he believed in. His war was with the armed soldiers and the police of this state".

Following this speech, The Times reported that some of the mourners turned on the observing press corps and shouted abuse. A couple of months after the funeral, McAliskey explained her thinking to The Guardian. Their reporter, David Sharrock, asked if her tirade had been intended to counteract the negative stories about McGlinchey that had recently appeared in the press. McAliskey said

"It's very difficult to conduct a conversation about a person who bore no resemblance in the media to the person I knew for 10 years. His thinking was just fundamentally democratic and to acknowledge that Dominic McGlinchey had an intellect was to acknowledge the reality of this conflict here. Republicanism is not simply anti-partitionist and confined to Ireland. It is a tradition of secular egalitarian democracy. So yes. Dominic was the finest republican of his generation. The rest of it I might take back...I don't even believe in hell."

=== South Tyrone Empowerment Programme ===
McAliskey is chief executive of the South Tyrone Empowerment Programme (STEP) and was involved in its founding in 1997. STEP provides a range of services and advocacy in areas including community development, training, support and advice for migrants, policy work, and community enterprise.

=== Denied entry into the US ===
In 2003 she was barred from entering the United States and deported on the grounds that the United States Department of State had declared her to pose "a serious threat to the security of the United States" – apparently referring to her conviction for incitement to riot in 1969 – although she protested that she had no terrorist involvement and had frequently been permitted to travel to the United States in the past.

=== Later political activity ===
On 12 May 2007, McAliskey was a guest speaker at the socialist republican political party Éirígí's first Annual James Connolly commemoration in Arbour Hill, Dublin. She works with migrant workers to improve their treatment in Northern Ireland.

During the 2016 Northern Ireland Assembly election, McAliskey was an election agent for People before Profit's candidate in Foyle, Eamonn McCann. McCann was successfully elected.

During the campaigning for the 2024 European Parliament election in Ireland, McAliskey endorsed Clare Daly in the Dublin constituency.

== Political views ==
Throughout her life, McAliskey has been associated with Irish republicanism and various socialist and communist groups. In September 1969 the Unionist politician Stratton Mills dubbed Devlin "nothing less than Fidel Castro in a miniskirt". Devlin responded that ideologically she was "as left as James Connolly and the starry plough". In a May 1969 interview, McAliskey stated she had "never read Marx", but stated that "I have read Connolly and if James Connolly was a revolutionary socialist then so am I". She also stated her admiration for Countess Markievicz.

=== Border Poll ===
In March 2017 McAliskey stated that she would not vote 'Yes' in a Border Poll held on the prospect of a United Ireland. She also accused Sinn Féin of seeking United Ireland only if it could control that state. McAliskey stated: "Sinn Féin has no intention of moving forward to a united Ireland that it doesn't control." Additionally, she stated: "Do I think the people who are in the current mainstream of political ideology – whether that's from Fine Gael and Fianna Fail right through Sinn Féin, on into the SDLP and on over to the Unionists and the DUP – should be let out to run a country? No". McAliskey expanded: "Would I like to dismantle the Irish Republic? Yes. Would I like to dismantle the northern state? Yes. I would like to start again and have a constitutional conference, a series of clear discussions and debates and a democratic process for building a new independent republic in which everybody could feel they belonged."

In November 2018, during a live public interview in Belfast during an episode of the Blindboy podcast, McAliskey stated she would not vote for a United Ireland unless that combined state was explicitly socialist. In August 2019 McAliskey made a similar statement, once again affirming she would not vote for a United Ireland in a Border Poll, asking rhetorically, "Who would want to join the Free State?". This prompted the Irish political magazine The Phoenix to accuse McAliskey of having abandoned Irish republicanism. The Phoenix contrasted her statements with statements McAliskey made in 1992, in which she proclaimed she would "burn every blade of grass" in Ireland to retain her "birthright".

In September 2023 McAliskey stated: "I have no more interest than the average Unionist in being submerged into the Free State. Absolutely none. I can think of no worse fate that might befall a population than to be sucked into the existing system of the Republic of Ireland. I think we need a new Ireland, and I think it starts with a new Constitution."

=== Northern Ireland ===
Speaking in September 2016, McAliskey stated that if the Irish and British governments had "been serious" about reforming Northern Ireland following the Good Friday Agreement, they would have "insisted on a 20-year strategy for desegregating housing, desegregating education, ending our private and cultural segregation".

In February 2018 Declan Kearney of Sinn Féin claimed the Northern Ireland civil rights movement was influenced by decisions of the IRA and the Sinn Féin leadership. Kearney told the BBC "Republicans were involved. The IRA and the Sinn Féin leaderships encouraged their activists to organise and to campaign under the umbrella of the civil rights movement, alongside other democrats and other political activists – human rights activists, communists and trade unionists. So, the role of republicanism was central to the emergence of the civil rights movement along with many others." In response, McAliskey stated that Kearney's views were "delusional silliness".

=== Republicanism ===
McAliskey stated in September 2016 that "If republicanism is about being true to the ideals of Thomas Paine and Wolfe Tone, then Sinn Féin are bad Republicans", and "If you take as the keystone of republicanism that authority exercised over a human being, without that human being’s acquiescence and knowledge, is a usurpation of that person’s rights, then by what definition are Sinn Féin republicans?".

=== Abortion ===
McAliskey has described herself as a "hardliner" on abortion, stating "I don’t need, and you are not entitled to, an explanation about what I do with me, to make you feel better. You can’t say some abortions are okay and some are not. You are either pro-choice or you are not. I am a hardliner and most people don’t dare enunciate that view yet. I have a clear, old-fashioned bottom line: abortion on demand is a valid demand".

McAliskey believes in abortion at any point of the pregnancy: "So if it's my body and it's my right, it's my right from the start to the end. So don't tell me to settle for the first 12 weeks, the first 24 weeks, a position where a foetus may not have any real chance of survival. Don't tell me these things will be acceptable, but making a choice for myself in any circumstance is my choice. I've always believed in the fundamental right of any woman to secure a safe, a free termination of pregnancy, an abortion, when she asks for it – and that there's a full stop and an exclamation mark after that."

== Personal life ==
In 1971, she gave birth to a daughter, Róisín, which cost her some political support because she was unmarried. She later married Róisín's father Michael McAliskey on her 26th birthday on 23 April 1973. Devlin is a fluent Irish speaker.

== In popular culture ==
In 1969, director and producer John Goldschmidt made the documentary film Bernadette Devlin for ATV, which was shown on the British television channel ITV and on the American television channel CBS's 60 Minutes programme, and included footage of Devlin during the Battle of the Bogside. She was also interviewed at length by Marcel Ophüls in A Sense of Loss (1972). Another documentary, Bernadette: Notes on a Political Journey, directed by Irish programme-maker Leila Doolan, was released in 2011. At the 2008 Cannes Film Festival a biographical film of Devlin was announced, but she stated that "the whole concept is abhorrent to me" and the film was not made.

Devlin, and her assault on the British Home Secretary, Reginald Maudling after the Bloody Sunday massacre, were the subject of the title song of the 1990 music album, Slap! by anarchist pop/punk band Chumbawamba.

In the 2002 film, Bloody Sunday, Devlin is played by actress Mary Moulds.

Parliament of the United Kingdom
| Preceded by George Forrest | Member of Parliament for Mid Ulster; 1969 – 1974 | Succeeded by John Dunlop |
| Preceded by Les Huckfield | Baby of the House; 1969–1974 | Succeeded by Dafydd Elis-Thomas |
