= Independent Socialist Party (Ireland) =

Left-wing organisation in the European republic

The Independent Socialist Party was a far left political party in Ireland. It was founded in 1976 as a split from the Irish Republican Socialist Party named the Irish Committee for a Socialist Programme, calling for more prominent socialist politics and less emphasis on paramilitary activity. The following year, it renamed itself the "Independent Socialist Party" and was joined by former UK Member of Parliament Bernadette McAliskey.

The party entered discussions with the Socialist Workers' Movement (SWM), with the aim of forming a joint organisation. A fusion was agreed but subsequently narrowly rejected by a membership conference. The SWM later, 1978, joined the Socialist Labour Party. As a result, the Independent Socialist Party decided to disband.
