= Banana Peel =

1963 French-Italian-German comedy film by Marcel Ophüls

- Directed by: Marcel Ophüls
- Screenplay by: Charles Williams (novel Nothing in Her Way); Marcel Ophüls; Claude Sautet; Daniel Boulanger
- Starring: Jeanne Moreau; Jean-Paul Belmondo
- Cinematography: Jean Rabier
- Edited by: Monique Kirsanoff
- Music by: Ward Swingle
- Distributed by: Compagnie Commerciale Française Cinématographique (CCFC) (France); Variety Distribution (Italy)
- Release date: 1963
- Running time: 105 minutes
- Countries: France; Italy; West Germany
- Language: French

Banana Peel (French: Peau de banane, Italian: Buccia di banana, German: Heißes Pflaster) is a 1963 French-Italian-German comedy film starring Jeanne Moreau and Jean Paul Belmondo. The costumes were created by Pierre Cardin.

It recorded admissions in France of 1,909,913.

== Cast ==
- Jeanne Moreau as Cathy / Madame Volney
- Jean-Paul Belmondo as Michel Thibault
- Claude Brasseur as Charlie Meyer
- Jean-Pierre Marielle as Paul Reynaldo
- Gert Fröbe as Raymond Lachard
- Paulette Dubost as Germaine Bontemps / Madame Bordas
- Alain Cuny as Hervé Bontemps
- Charles Regnier as Bontemps
- Cathy Baïeff as Lachard's lover
- Henri Poirier as Antoine
