= South Tyrone Empowerment Programme =

Rights-based organization in Northern Ireland

- Abbreviation: STEP
- Formation: 1997; 29 years ago
- Founder: Bernadette Devlin McAliskey
- Type: NGO
- Legal status: Charity
- Headquarters: The Junction, 12 Beechvalley Way, Dungannon, Northern Ireland, BT70 1BS
- Locations: Dungannon, Cookstown & Magherafelt
- Region served: Mid Ulster
- Website: stepni.org

The South Tyrone Empowerment Programme (STEP) is a rights-based non-governmental organisation and charity based in Dungannon, Northern Ireland. Founded in 1997, it provides a range of services and advocacy in areas including community development, training, support and advice for migrants, policy work and community enterprise, with its commercial arm, Step Training Limited (STL), concentrating on interpreting and translation. It was founded by Bernadette Devlin McAliskey and has been funded by European Union and British government grants and philanthropy from organisations such as Atlantic Philanthropies.
