= Edward Wilkinson (secret agent) =

British SOE agent of World War II (1902–1944)

Edward (Teddy) Mountford Wilkinson (1902–1944) (code named Alexandre) was an agent in France of the United Kingdom's clandestine Special Operations Executive (SOE) during World War II. The purpose of SOE was to conduct espionage, sabotage, and reconnaissance in countries occupied by Nazi Germany or other Axis powers. SOE agents allied themselves with resistance groups and supplied them with weapons and equipment parachuted in from England. Wilkinson was parachuted into France in 1942, captured by Germans but freed by a French official that same year, captured again by the Germans in 1943, and executed in 1944.

France awarded Wilkinson the Croix de Guerre 1939–1945 and he was mentioned in despatches. He is mentioned on the Valençay SOE Memorial and panel 210 of the Runnymede Memorial.

== Early life ==
Nicknamed Ted or Teddy by his family, he was born in Saint-Louis (Missouri) to a French mother and English father - he (died 1936) was a porcelain maker and she (died 1938) was from Alsatian stock, with relations running a restaurant on rue des Pyramides in Paris. He had two brothers - George, also an SOE agent in France, and Herbert, a fighter pilot. George was captured and executed by the Germans. Herbert will killed in Tunisia

Wilkinson was baptised a Protestant in the Palais d'Orsay, Paris on 26 June 1904 and studied in the city at the lycée Henri-IV. He returned to the US, where he became a racing driver on the Salt Lake circuits. He returned to France, where he met Yvonne Diebolt, a mother of three whose husband refused to divorce her. She and Edward moved to Angers, where he became a sales rep for Arthur-Martin. Yvonne ran a boarding house. In 1940, after the invasion of France by Nazi Germany he fled to the UK and became a Flying Officer in the Royal Air Force Volunteer Reserve, volunteering for SOE the following year.

He then began his SOE training in Wanborough Manor (map-reading, radio, sabotage, weapons, unarmed combat), Arisaig (physical training), Beaulieu (secret life, resisting interrogation, surviving in the countryside, practical work, opening safes and handcuffs, railway sabotage), Ringway (parachute drops) and London (testing his fake identity).

Wilkinson was described by a colleague as "a tall thin man with a friendly expression...who frequently smoked a pipe...looking like a cartoon impression of an elegant English gentleman." He spoke French better than he did English.

== Paris, Angers and Lyon ==
Wilkinson arrived 1/2 June 1942 by parachute with SOE agent Benjamin Cowburn. plus luggage on an additional parachute. They were dropped in Vichy France (still unoccupied by the Germans) 65 kilometres (40 miles) distant from their intended spot but met each other by pre-arrangement in Tarbes. Cowburn, already experienced as an SOE agent, was to help Wilkinson create a network of resistants. They traveled first to Lyon to meet with Virginia Hall, another SOE agent, in Lyon and find a wireless operator, Denis Rake, and then onward to Paris in occupied France, crossing the border by train using Cowburn's technique of hiding in a cavity under the tender. Wilkinson would later use a different and more comfortable way of crossing the border between occupied and unoccupied (Vichy) France. Cowburn's verdict was that Wilkinson would make an excellent agent.

Wilkinson caught a train to Angers and with he wife Yvonne's help (She took on the last name "Keller") he set up Privet, a small network of friends. He returned to Paris from time to time to try to meet the radio operator at an agreed rendezvous point. He finally managed this, but instead of the expected man it was Denis Rake, sent by Hall without a transmitter. Wilkinson found out that Rake had got into a relationship with a German staff officer in Paris and demanded he end it, but Rake initially refused. Wilkinson then decided to go back to Lyon and to go with him Rake in the end had to comply with Wilkinson's demand.

They recrossed the demarcation line and got to Hall in Lyon, who gave them a transmitter. There Wilkinson also met Richard Henry Heslop, a friend from training, and the three men decided to cross the demarcation line near Limoges. In that city Rake stayed in one hotel and the other two in a different hotel. They dined that day in the restaurant of the Hôtel des Faisans. They would not tell Rake where they were staying as they did not trust him. He did not turn up at his hotel on 15 August and, despite an SOE rule to continue as normal in that situation, Wilkinson and Heslop went looking for him and were arrested as soon as they walked past that hotel a second time.

Rake had been arrested at a police checkpoint three hours earlier. He had hidden his radio transmitter in the cloakroom of the hotel, but the policeman found 65,000 francs in his luggage, not pinned together in bundles of ten as was then usual. Heslop and Wilkinson claimed only to have met Rake the day before, but Rake's and Wilkinson's tickets had consecutive numbers and their identity cards were in the same handwriting despite their claim to be from different places.

== Final months ==
Wilkinson, Heslop, and Rake were moved to Castres prison near Paris. They spent almost 3 months in miserable, starving conditions in the prison before being transferred on 7 November to an internment camp for captured British soldiers in Vichy France. Conditions in Vichy became much more dangerous for SOE agents after 8 November 1942 when the Germans invaded and effectively took over the reins of government. On 27 November, the French commandant of the internment camp released Heslop, Wilkinson, and Rake to avoid having to turn them over to the Germans. A bus took them to nearby Roybon and they were given money and ration cards. Heslop and Wilkinson decided to leave the region as quickly as possible and walked to Le Puy-en-Velay, 160 kilometres (99 miles) distant. Wilkinson and Heslop resumed their journey towards Angers but suspected Rake of having caused their arrest and so left him behind. Three days' walk got them to Le Puy-en-Velay, where they met one of Wilkinson's acquaintances, Jean Joulian, who procured fake papers for them.

They moved on to Paris, where Wilkinson met with race-car driver and SOE agent William Grover-Williams, another friend from training, who helped him reestablish radio contact with London. Wilkinson was now too well known in Angers and so, in April 1943, SOE asked him to set up a network in Nantes, with Heslop staying in Angers in a boarding house run by Yvonne. She now led the Privet network. However, the Gestapo spotted Heslop and he had to flee to the home of one of his accomplices. Yvonne moved to Nantes to join Wilkinson. In Nantes, he located two drop zones for arms and ammunition, but bad weather foiled any air drops.

Time was running out for Wilkinson. The Germans were asking questions about him in Angers. In Paris, the Germans were closing in on the Prosper Network, headed by Francis Suttill. Wilkinson still had no radio operator and thus frequently went to Paris to communicate with SOE headquarters in London using one of Prosper's wireless operators. In June 1943, via the secretary to the police commissioner in Limoges who had made contact with one of Wilkinson's childhood girlfriends, he was requested to help two comrades in dire trouble. He was asked to meet with the police commissioner, named Imar. He suspected a trap and Heslop (then in Paris), France Antelme (his Paris contact), and Suttill all advised him not to go. On 6 June France Antelme saw Wilkinson and his childhood girlfriend enter the Le Globe cafe on boulevard de Strasbourg but did not see them come out again. The cafe had an out-of-sight exit onto rue du Faubourg-Saint-Martin. Both were arrested, his girlfriend dying in Ravensbrück concentration camp, He was executed at Mauthausen concentration camp.

Wilkinson's wife, Yvonne, was arrested on 20 August. She survived imprisonment at Ravensbrück concentration camp.

== Bibliography ==
- (in French) Michael Richard Daniell Foot, Des Anglais dans la Résistance. Le Service Secret Britannique d'Action (SOE) en France 1940-1944, annot. Jean-Louis Crémieux-Brilhac, Tallandier, 2008, ISBN 978-2-84734-329-8
  - French translation of the British official SOE history of its work in France SOE in France. An account of the Work of the British Special Operations Executive in France, 1940-1944, London, Her Majesty's Stationery Office, 1966, 1968 ; Whitehall History Publishing, in association with Frank Cass, 2004.
- Denis Rake, Rake's Progress; the Gay - and Dramatic - Adventures of Major Denis Rake, MC, the Reluctant British War-Time Agent, with a foreword by Douglas Fairbanks, Hardcover, 271 p., 22 cm, Publisher: Leslie Frewin, 1968, ASIN: B001JPUDB6, ISBN 009087580X
- Richard Henry Heslop, Xavier: the famous British agent's dramatic account of his work in the French Resistance, Hart-Davis, 1970, ISBN 024663989X.
- (in French) Gilles Perrault, Les Jardins de l'Observatoire, Fayard, 1995. Le présent article s'appuie sur les chapitres 13 à 20.
