= A Sense of Loss (film) =

1972 documentary film directed by Marcel Ophüls

- Title card
- Directed by: Marcel Ophüls
- Produced by: Marcel Ophüls
- Cinematography: Simon Edelstein
- Edited by: Marion Kraft
- Production companies: Cinema X Swiss Broadcasting Corporation
- Distributed by: Cinema 5 Distributing; Yle
- Release date: 2 October 1972; (New York Film Festival)
- Running time: 135 minutes
- Countries: Switzerland; United States
- Language: English

A Sense of Loss is a 1972 documentary film directed and produced by Marcel Ophüls on The Troubles in Northern Ireland.

== Production ==
A Sense of Loss was shot in December 1971 and January 1972, at the height of The Troubles. It contains interviews with ordinary Irish Protestants and Irish Catholics, politicians and British Army soldiers, as well as news clips of bombings and violence. Interviewees include Noël Browne, William Craig, Seán Cronin, Bernadette Devlin, Michael Farrell, Gerry Fitt, Billy Hull, Jack Lynch, John McKeague, Reginald Maudling and Harry Tuzo.

Anne Lewis worked as assistant editor on the film, saying that it taught her how to "structure massive quantities of documentary material without the use of narration and about telling the truth even if it doesn't fit a popular notion of political reality."

== Release ==
The BBC chose not to air A Sense of Loss due to a perceived "pro-Irish" bias. Ophüls said he was in favour of a negotiated end to the conflict and that the British Army should remain for the time being.

A Sense of Loss premiered at the 1972 New York Film Festival.

== Reception ==
In Sight & Sound, Louise Swert praised the film, saying "despite his failure to provide the outsider with too much factual information, Ophüls' masterful film leaves one with a clear idea of the seemingly insurmountable obstacles to compromise." Time Out criticised it, saying "Ophüls' partisanship is undisguised from very early on, but it's still difficult to forgive the way he loads the evidence [...] the spokesmen for the British presence and some of the more bigoted Protestants are sufficiently eloquent in condemning themselves without interference from Ophüls' self-satisfied liberal smugness."

John O'Flynn's Music, the Moving Image and Ireland, 1897–2017, noted the opening scene, which intercuts shots from the New York City St. Patrick's Day Parade with shots from republican funerals, as an implied criticism of NORAID's financial support for the IRA.
