= Lucq-de-Béarn =

- Commune
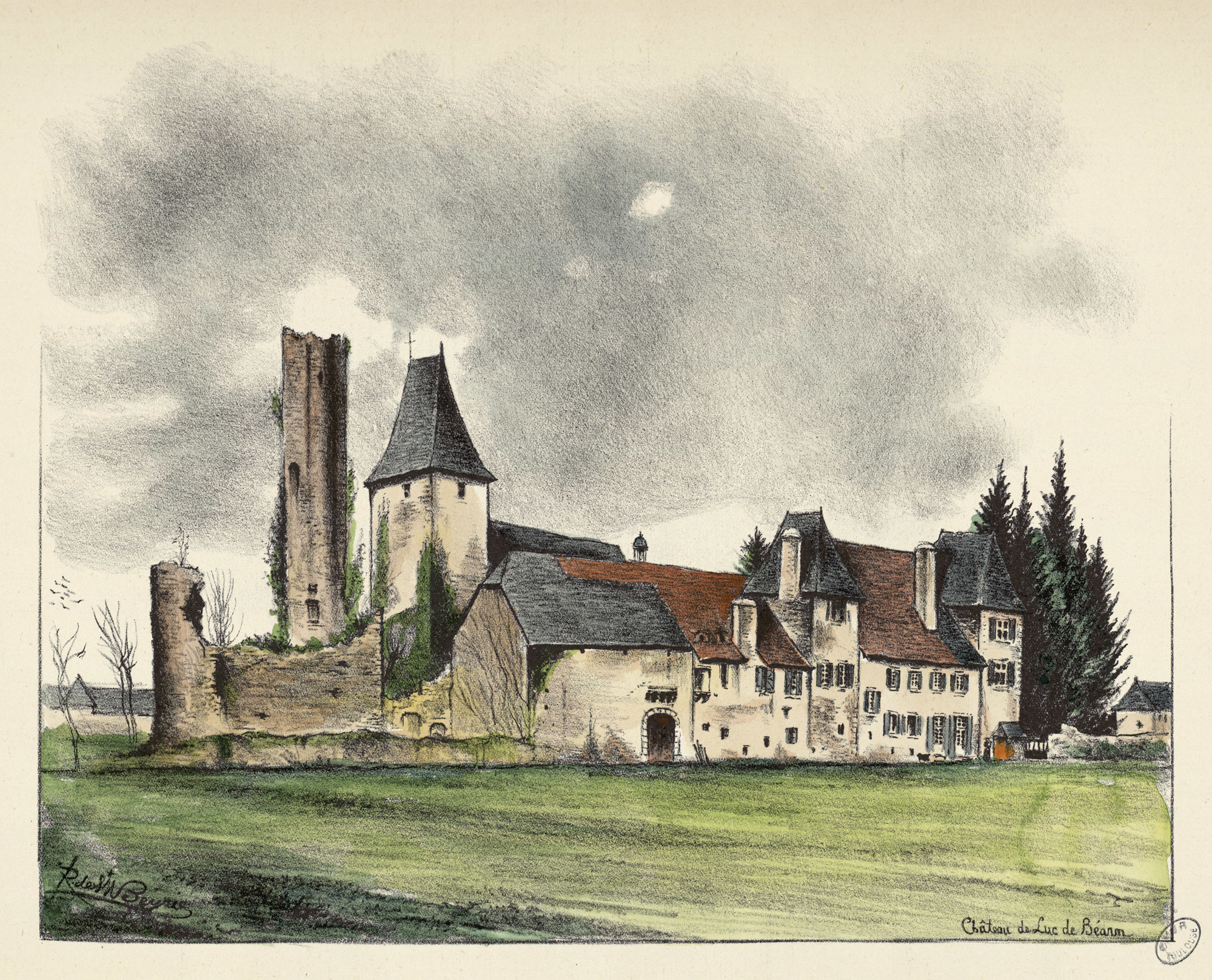
- The chateau of Luc de Béarn
- Location of Lucq-de-Béarn
- Location within France Location within Nouvelle-Aquitaine
- Coordinates: 43°17′18″N 0°39′27″W
- Country: France
- Region: Nouvelle-Aquitaine
- Department: Pyrénées-Atlantiques
- Arrondissement: Pau
- Canton: Le Cœur de Béarn
- Intercommunality: Lacq-Orthez

Government
  - Mayor (2020–2026): Albert Lasserre-Bisconte
- Area^{1}: 48.77 km^{2} (18.83 sq mi)
- Elevation: 259 m (850 ft)
- Highest elevation: 329 m (1,079 ft)
- Lowest elevation: 136 m (446 ft)
- Population (2023): 925
  - Density: 19.0/km^{2} (49.1/sq mi)
- Time zone: UTC+01:00 (CET)
  - Summer (DST): UTC+02:00 (CEST)
- INSEE/Postal code: 64359 /64360
- ^{1} French Land Register data, which excludes lakes, ponds, glaciers > 1 km^{2} (0.386 sq mi or 247 acres) and river estuaries.

Lucq-de-Béarn (French pronunciation: [lyk də beaʁn], literally Lucq of Béarn；Occitan: Luc) is a commune in the Pyrénées-Atlantiques department in south-western France.

== See also ==
- Communes of the Pyrénées-Atlantiques department
