= Róisín McAliskey =

Irish political activist

Róisín Elizabeth McAliskey (born 1971) is the daughter of Irish republican activist Bernadette Devlin McAliskey and Michael McAliskey. She was once accused by German authorities of having been involved in an attack claimed by the Provisional IRA.

== Osnabrück mortar attack ==
She was arrested (while four months pregnant) in 1996 on an extradition warrant issued by Germany accusing her of involvement in the Osnabrück mortar attack against a British Army compound at Osnabrück. On 2 January 1998, a magistrate cleared her extradition to Germany. After a long and prominent campaign in which her mother took a leading role supported by many influential citizens, including politicians, from the Republic of Ireland, the United Kingdom and the United States, British Home Secretary Jack Straw vetoed the extradition on health grounds. She eventually gave birth to a healthy daughter, Loinnir, in England.

Due to the nature of the European Arrest Warrant, McAliskey spent 18 months in jail despite never being charged with any crime. Her UK lawyers were unable to view any of the evidence that led to the warrant in Germany and only following discoveries made by a German television programme and the appointment of a German lawyer to examine the files in Germany did it become clear that she had no case to answer.

In July 2000, the then Solicitor General in the UK, Ross Cranston, confirmed to Parliament that the CPS had undertaken an investigation into Róisín McAliskey's case stating "Further to the statement of the Home Secretary on 10 March 1998 that he would not order the extradition of Roisin McAliskey to Germany, the Crown Prosecution Service... has considered whether to prosecute Roisin McAliskey in this country. [It] has concluded that there is not a realistic prospect of convicting Miss McAliskey for any offence arising out of the Osnabruk [sic] bombing."' While not widely reported at the time it was believed that this announcement brought an end to the matter, however that turned out not to be the case.

On 21 May 2007, McAliskey was again arrested on the same European Arrest Warrant, the German authorities having sent it back to the UK in October 2006 just as it was due to expire. She was released on bail of £2,500. The extradition bid was denied in November 2007.
