= George Alfred Wilkinson =

George Alfred Wilkinson (31 August 1913 - 5 October 1944) was a member of the Special Operations Executive, as was his brother Edward. His codename was 'Étienne' and he reached the rank of captain. He was mentioned in despatches and France awarded him the Croix de guerre 1939-1945 with palm.

He is mentioned on the Valençay SOE Memorial and panel 21 column 3 of the Brookwood Memorial, whilst a panel unveiled at Buchenwald on 15 October 2010 honours Allied officers from block 17 murdered between September 1944 and March 1945, notably including Wilkinson and nineteen other SOE agents.

== Life ==
He was born in the 1st arrondissement of Paris to the Englishman Gaston Wilkinson and his wife Alice Leimbach, who was from an Alsatian family. George's own wife was Jeanne Fifis (1915, Clichy - 1994, Olivet).

On 5 April 1944 he was parachuted in near Orléans to set up the 'Historian' network in that area. Philippe de Vomécourt indicated his first contacts and on the night of 5-6 April two more of the network arrived, radio operator Lilian Rolfe and André Studler, an American weapons instructor. He effectively organised several arms drops for the French Resistance - two in May, seventeen in June and twenty-four in July.

On 26 June 1944 he was arrested at Olivet and imprisoned in Orléans. In August he was moved to Buchenwald concentration camp, where he was executed on 5 October the same year aged thirty-one.

== Bibliography ==
- Michael Richard Daniell Foot, SOE in France. An account of the Work of the British Special Operations Executive in France, 1940-1944, London, Her Majesty's Stationery Office, 1966, 1968 ; Whitehall History Publishing, in association with Frank Cass, 2004 - the British official history of SOE in France.
- (in French) Hugh Verity, Nous atterrissions de nuit..., preface by Jacques Mallet, 5th French edition, Éditions Vario, 2004. ISBN 978-2913663107
- Lt. Col. E.G. Boxshall, Chronology of SOE operations with the resistance in France during world war II, 1960, document dactylographié (copy in Pearl Witherington-Cornioley's library, accessible in Valençay library). See sheet 7, HISTORIAN CIRCUIT.
- (in French) J.D. Sainsbury, Le Mémorial de la section F, Gerry Holdsworth Special Forces Charitable Trust, 1992.
- (in French) Paul Guillaume Au temps de l'héroïsme et de la trahison, Orléans, Imprimerie nouvelle, 1948 ; rééd. : Loddé, Orléans, 1978. - gives an account of his arrest and treatment by the Gestapo
