= The Sorrow and the Pity =

1969 documentary film about Nazi-occupied France

- Movie poster
- French: Le Chagrin et la Pitié
- Directed by: Marcel Ophuls
- Written by: Marcel Ophuls; André Harris
- Produced by: Alain de Sedouy; André Harris
- Cinematography: André Gazut; Jürgen Thieme
- Edited by: Claude Vajda
- Production companies: Norddeutscher Rundfunk; Société suisse de radiodiffusion
- Release date: 18 September 1969
- Running time: 251 minutes
- Countries: France; West Germany; Switzerland
- Languages: French; German; English

The Sorrow and the Pity (French: Le Chagrin et la Pitié) is a two-part 1969 documentary film by Marcel Ophuls about the collaboration between the Vichy government and Nazi Germany during World War II. The film uses interviews with a German officer, collaborators, and resistance fighters from Clermont-Ferrand. They comment on the nature of and reasons for collaboration, including antisemitism, Anglophobia, fear of Bolsheviks and Soviet invasion, and the desire for power.

The title comes from a comment by interviewee Marcel Verdier, a pharmacist in Montferrat, Isère, who says "the two emotions I experienced the most [during the Nazi occupation] were sorrow and pity".

== Synopsis ==
The film examines the responses of the French people to German occupation and their reasons for tending toward resistance or collaboration, focusing on the Auvergne region and the city of Clermont-Ferrand. Events are presented in roughly chronological order, with interviewees appearing throughout both parts of the film. Maurice Chevalier's "Sweepin' the Clouds Away" is used repeatedly during the film. Chevalier was a popular entertainer with the German occupation force and was accused of collaboration even while he claimed to have offered support to the resistance, mirroring the complexities of French reactions to occupation highlighted in the film.

=== Part 1: "The Collapse" ===
Jewish film entrepreneur Bernard Natan on trial in France for fraud c. 1936; screenshot from part 1, The Collapse

Part one of the film focuses on France's defeat by Germany in 1940, the initial support for armistice and the Pétain government, the beginning of German occupation, and the early stirrings of resistance. Various explanations for France's defeat, capitulation, and acceptance of the Vichy government are offered, with differing opinions depending on the political leanings and class status of the interviewees. Particular attention is given to the German and Vichy use of antisemitism, including discussion of the distribution of the German propaganda film Jud Suss in France (scenes of which are shown). Also included is an extended interview with French Jewish politician and officer Pierre Mendès France about his trial and imprisonment by the Vichy government and later escape. Mendès France was arrested on trumped-up charges of desertion after leaving France on the SS Le Masilia, together with Pierre Viénot, Jean Zay, and Alex Wiltzer, as they attempted to rejoin their military unit which had moved to Morocco. He eventually escaped from jail to join Charles de Gaulle's forces operating out of England, and later served as prime minister of France for eight months from 1954 to 1955.

=== Part 2: "The Choice" ===
Part two focuses on the movement of different factions in France toward more open resistance against or collaboration with the Germans. Partisan actions and underground networks are discussed, as well as increased cooperation with German authorities by the Vichy government under the French prime minister Pierre Laval. Special attention is paid to the denaturalization and deportation of French Jews under Vichy. This part features a long interview with Christian de La Mazière, one of 7,000 French youth to fight on the Eastern Front wearing German uniforms. As de La Mazière explains how his conservative upbringing and fear of communism led to his embrace of Fascism, Ophuls overlays audio of Hitler speaking. Meanwhile, a guide points out items connected to the Hohenzollern royal family as he leads a tour through Sigmaringen Castle where the Vichy government was briefly based near the end of the war.

The last segment of part two details the liberation of France and the legacy of resistants and collaborators in France. Footage of French women who associated with German soldiers having their heads shaved is shown, and an interviewee describes how she was accused of denouncing resistance members and then tortured by alleged members before standing trial.

== Interviews ==
Interviews were conducted by Ophuls, André Harris or George Bidault, with:

- Georges Bidault
- Matthäus Bleibinger
- Charles Braun
- Maurice Buckmaster
- Émile Coulaudon
- Emmanuel d'Astier de la Vigerie
- Comte René de Chambrun
- Christian de La Mazière
- Jacques Duclos
- Colonel Raymond Du Jonchay
- Anthony Eden
- Marcel Fouche-Degliame
- Raphaël Géminiani
- Alexis Grave
- Louis Grave
- Georges Lamirand
- Pierre Le Calvez
- Claude Levy
- Pierre Mendès France
- Elmar Michel
- Denis Rake
- Henri Rochat
- Paul Schmidt
- Edward Spears
- Helmut Tausend
- Roger Tounze
- Marcel Verdier
- Walter Warlimont

== Archival footage ==
Archival footage is interwoven through the film, featuring historical figures including:

- Emmanuel d'Astier de La Vigerie
- Junie Astor
- René Bousquet
- Alphonse de Châteaubriant
- Maurice Chevalier
- Danielle Darrieux
- Suzy Delair
- Jacques Doriot
- Charles de Gaulle
- Raymond Guyot
- Adolf Hitler
- Reinhard Heydrich
- Pierre Laval
- Philippe Pétain
- Albert Préjean
- Viviane Romance

== Production ==
Initially commissioned by French government-owned television to create a two part made for TV documentary, the film was banned after Ophuls submitted it to the studio that hired him.

Ophuls shot his film over a two-year period, gathering about 50 hours of potentially usable material to edit. The title is drawn from a scene in which a young woman asks her grandfather, a pharmacist, what he felt during the Occupation, and the somber answer is just two stark emotions.

== Release ==
The film had its world premiere in Germany in 1969. It was finally shown in France in 1971, being initially released in a theatre in Rive Gauche in Paris as a 16 mm film where it was a hit before being blown up to a 35 mm print for showing at the Paramount Elysees on the Champs-Élysées. The film was shown on French television in 1981 after being banned from that medium for years. In 1969, after the director submitted the film to the studio that hired him, the network head "told a government committee that the film 'destroys myths that the people of France still need'". Frederick Busi suggests that this was because of how uncomfortable it is to face the reality of collaborationism. Writing of French conservative establishment groups' reactions to the film, "They, too, preferred that little be said about their role, and in some ways this reluctance is more significant than that of the extremists, since they represent so large a segment of society and mainly dominate contemporary politics." It is frequently assumed that the reason was French reluctance to admit the facts of French history. While this may have been a factor, the principal mover in the decision was Simone Veil, a Jewish inmate of Auschwitz who became a minister and the first president of the European Parliament, on the grounds that the film presented too one-sided a view.

The first DVD release of the film in France came in November 2011. In the UK, home media releases include a 2017 DVD and Blu-Ray from Arrow Academy which, among its extra content, features a lengthy 2004 interview with Ophuls by Ian Christie.

In a 2022 re-release in the United States it grossed $13,082.

== Reception ==
The candid approach of The Sorrow and the Pity shone a spotlight on antisemitism in France and disputed the idealized collective memory of the nation at large. In 2001, Richard Trank, a documentarian of the Simon Wiesenthal Center, described it as "a film about morality that explores the role of ordinary people".

In France, after its release, communists, socialists, and "independent groups" treated the film favorably; however, the far right disapproved on account of the director's background. Some French critics denounced the film as unpatriotic. The film has also been criticized for being too selective and that the director was "too close to the events portrayed to provide an objective study of the period."

In the United States, Time magazine gave a positive review of the film, and wrote that Marcel Ophuls "tries to puncture the bourgeois myth—or protectively askew memory—that allows France generally to act as if hardly any Frenchmen collaborated with the Germans." Critic Roger Ebert gave the film four stars out of four, and praised the depth and complexity of its human portraiture, which somehow still manages to avoid any abstraction of collaboration.

Retrospectively, critical appraisals have become ever more lavish. Writing in the Los Angeles Times in 2000, US film critic Kenneth Turan called it a "monumental" work, and "one of the most potent documentaries ever made". The Arts Desk (UK) called it simply "the greatest documentary ever made about France during the Second World War".

== Accolades ==
In France, the film won the Grand Prize of the Dinard Festival.

In the United States, the film was nominated for an Academy Award in 1971 for Best Documentary Feature. In the same year, it received a special award by the National Society of Film Critics, "which called it 'a film of extraordinary public interest and distinction'." In 1972, it was named Best Foreign Language Film by the U.S. National Board of Review.

In the UK, it won the 1972 BAFTA award for Best Foreign TV Programme.

== In popular culture ==
The film is referenced as a plot device in Woody Allen's 1977 film Annie Hall. Film critic Donald Liebenson writes: "In one of the film's signature scenes, Alvy Singer (Allen) suggests he and Annie (Diane Keaton) go see the film. 'I'm not in the mood to see a four-hour documentary on Nazis,' Annie protests. In the film's poignant conclusion, Alvy runs into Annie as she is taking a date to see the film, which Alvy counts as 'a personal triumph'."

== See also ==
- Collaborationism
- German occupation of France in World War II
- The Holocaust in France
