= Marcel Ophuls =

German-French filmmaker (1927–2025)

- Born: 1 November 1927; Frankfurt, Prussia, Germany
- Died: 24 May 2025 (aged 97); Lucq-de-Béarn, France
- Citizenship: French; American
- Education: Occidental College; UC Berkeley
- Occupation: Film director
- Years active: 1950–2025
- Notable work: The Sorrow and the Pity (1969); Hôtel Terminus: The Life and Times of Klaus Barbie (1988)
- Spouse: Regine Ophuls
- Children: 3
- Father: Max Ophüls
- Awards: Academy Award for Best Documentary Feature (1988)

Marcel Ophuls (German: [ˈɔfʏls]; 1 November 1927 – 24 May 2025) was a German-French and American documentary filmmaker and actor, renowned for his notable works such as The Sorrow and the Pity (1969) and Hôtel Terminus: The Life and Times of Klaus Barbie (1988). Born to German-Jewish filmmaker Max Ophuls, the family fled Nazi Germany during its rise to power in the final stages of the Weimar Republic in 1933. Subsequently, they relocated to France, but fled in 1940 when the Nazis occupied the country. Finally, in 1941, the family emigrated to the United States, where Marcel became a citizen in 1950.

His film career began in 1950. He made films in the United States, France, and the United Kingdom. During his early career, he mostly worked in dramatic fictional films. He began making documentaries in the late 1960s in France. Starting in the late 1970s, he also made documentaries in the United States for the CBS and ABC television networks. He won an Academy Award in 1989 for Hôtel Terminus. He continued making films until he died in France in 2025 leaving his final project unfinished.

== Early life ==
Ophuls was born into a German-Jewish family on 1 November 1927 in Frankfurt, Germany. He was the son of Hildegard Wall and the director Max Ophüls. His family left Germany in 1933 following the coming to power of the Nazi Party and settled in Paris, France. Following the invasion of France by Germany in May 1940 they were forced to flee to the Vichy zone, remaining in hiding for over a year before crossing the Pyrenees into Spain in order to travel to the United States, arriving there in December 1941. Marcel attended Hollywood High School, then Occidental College, Los Angeles. He spent a brief period serving in a U.S. Army theatrical unit in Japan in 1946, then studied at the University of California, Berkeley. Ophuls became a naturalized citizen of France in 1938, and of the United States in 1950.

In 1956, he married Regine Ackermann. He noted in a 1988 interview, "...that his wife was "in the Hitler Youth." "My brother-in-law," he said, making the point in spades, "was in the Hermann Goering Division. I don't believe in collective guilt." With Ackermann, he had three daughters and three grandchildren.

Ophuls, like his father Max, preferred not to use the German umlaut in his name ("Ophüls"). Ophuls senior removed the umlaut when he took French citizenship, and the younger Ophuls adopted the same spelling.

== Career ==
When the family returned to Paris in 1950 Marcel became an assistant to Julien Duvivier and Anatole Litvak, and worked on John Huston's Moulin Rouge (1952) and his father's Lola Montès (1955). Through François Truffaut, Ophuls got to direct an episode of the portmanteau film Love at Twenty (1962). There followed the somewhat profitable Banana Peel (1963), a detective film starring Jeanne Moreau and Jean-Paul Belmondo.

=== Documentary filmmaker ===
With underwhelming box-office fortunes, Ophuls turned to making television news documentaries. Although he enjoyed making entertainment films, Ophuls became identified as a documentarian, using a characteristically sober interview style to resolve disparate experiences into a persuasive argument. He did not have an inferiority complex towards his father, because he viewed Max as a genius, and himself to be actually an inferior fiction film director. French TV commissioned a documentary on the Munich crisis of 1938: Munich (1967).

He then was commissioned to make a film that examined France under Nazi occupation, The Sorrow and the Pity (1969). The four-and-a-half-hour film portrays "French citizens who are revealed as having been all too eager to collaborate with the occupiers." The film exposed France's self-excusing myths and saw something nastier, shabbier, more political and more human. American film critic Pauline Kael described the film's impact this way: "There are fragments that in context gain a new meaning: the viciousness of shaving the heads of the women who had slept with Germans is horrible enough without the added recognition that probably those who did the shaving had spiritually slept with the Germans themselves." Although the film was commissioned by French TV, it caused so much outrage in France, that it was not broadcast until 1981.

=== 1970s works ===
The BBC commissioned him to make A Sense of Loss (1972). It looked at "The Troubles" in Northern Ireland and was filmed between December 1971 and January 1972.The film consisted of interviews with Protestants, Catholics, politicians, and some soldiers, combined with TV news clips of bombings and violence. The deaths of four individuals formed the central focus of the film.Yet again, another commissioned work for television did not get aired when it was ready, and it then premiered at the New York Film Festival in 1972.

The Memory of Justice (1976) was an ambitious comparison of US policy in Vietnam, and French foreign policy in the Algerian War to the atrocities of the Nazis and the lessons learned in aftermath of the Nuremberg Trials. Disagreements with one of his British backers, Visual Programme Systems (VPS), and a German backer, over the content and length of the film led to him being dismissed from the film in January 1975. Legal wrangling that eventually gave control back to Ophuls delayed the film's release until 1976. The film was screened at the 1976 Cannes Film Festival, but wasn't entered into the main competition. Reflecting back during the film's 2017 re-release, Orphuls considered this film to be his most personal and sincere work that he ever did. In the mid-1970s, he began producing documentaries for CBS and ABC.

=== Hôtel Terminus ===
With American funding, he made the feature documentary Hôtel Terminus: The Life and Times of Klaus Barbie (1988). The film presents interviews with both supporters and opponents of Barbie's trial, comprising journalists, former U.S. Counter Intelligence Corps agents, independent investigators of Nazi war crimes, and Barbie's defence attorney. A significant portion of the presented testimony exhibits inconsistencies. For instance, some interviewees assert that Barbie's inclusion in the trial was solely for symbolic purposes, while others contend that he remained free for four decades due to the protection provided by various governments, including the United States and Bolivia. This alleged protection was attributed to Barbie's connections with covert agents, and a public trial could have potentially compromised intelligence activities. Within the course of the film, Barbie was brought to trial and sentenced to life in prison. Near the end, his defense attorney vows to appeal the decision. During its world premiere, at the Cannes film festival, a near riot almost broke out between filmgoers who cannot forget the Holocaust, and those that wanted to move on and leave it in the past. It won an Academy Award, in 1989, for best documentary.

=== 1990s ===
His next project was an interview film with two senior East German Communists, November Days (1992).

In November 1995, the Cinematheque Ontario, in Toronto, held a major retrospective on Ophuls's works, including his newest film The Trouble We've Seen (1994), a ruminative look at how journalists cover war, especially during the Bosnian War. At the time of the retrospective, he complained that the film didn't have an "Anglo-Saxon" distributor and only had a rare few screenings in the United States and Canada. He was asked by The Globe and Mail's film critic Rick Groen, why he continued to make films considering all the frustrations? Ophuls replied:

The one reason to make documentaries is to try to create a context for the steady bombardment of images that plague us. Between real suffering and Hollywood schlock, people are losing the boundaries, and you get films like Oliver Stone's JFK. Take Bosnia, for example, where we seem incapable of reacting to the worst outrage since the Second World War. So the documentarians are the professional witnesses who must still get the message through the vaunted ratings and the bloated sensibilities. We're the resistance fighters standing up for something other than mass consumerism. And if the task seems hopeless, that's precisely why it's crucial. It's much harder to resist in 1940, when you think you're losing, than in 1944. Anybody can be a resistance fighter when the Allies have landed on the Normandy Beach.

== Later life and death ==
Every year the International Documentary Film Festival Amsterdam (IDFA) screens an acclaimed filmmaker's ten favourite films. In 2007, Iranian filmmaker Maziar Bahari selected The Sorrow and the Pity for his top ten classics from the history of documentary. At the 65th Berlin International Film Festival in February 2015 Ophuls received the Berlinale Camera award for his life work.

In 2014, Ophuls began crowd-sourcing funds for his new film Unpleasant Truths, about the continuing Israeli occupation of Palestinian territories, to be co-directed with Israeli filmmaker Eyal Sivan. In part, the film seeks to focus on possible links between the 2014 Israeli war on Gaza and the rise in anti-Semitism in Europe as well as whether "Islamophobia is the new anti-Semitism." It was originally intended as a collaboration with Jean-Luc Godard, who backed out early in the process; Godard makes an appearance as himself in the film. As of 2017, the film had not yet been completed due to unspecified financial and legal troubles, and may not be finished ever.

Ophuls died in Lucq-de-Béarn, France on 24 May 2025, at the age of 97.

== Filmography ==
Filmography sourced from MUBI.

=== As director ===
- Matisse, ou Le talent du Bonheur (1960) (short)
- Love at Twenty (1962)
- Peau de banane (1963)
- Fire at Will (1965)
- Munich or Peace in our Time (1967)
- The Sorrow and the Pity (Le Chagrin et la pitié) (1969) – marked a turning point in the French debate about the Vichy Regime.
- The Harvest of My Lai (1970)
- A Sense of Loss (1972) – on the Troubles in Northern Ireland.
- The Memory of Justice (1973–76) – on the Nuremberg Trials, the Vietnam War, and the nature of war atrocities
- Hôtel Terminus: The Life and Times of Klaus Barbie (1988) – winner of the Academy Award for Best Documentary Feature
- November Days (1992)
- Veillées d'armes (The Troubles We've Seen: A History of Journalism in Wartime) (1994)
- Un Voyageur (2012) – self-portrait of the artist, where Marcel Ophuls delivers his remembrances and sums up his experience

=== As actor ===
- Lola Montès (1955) – (uncredited)
- Egon Schiele – Exzess und Bestrafung (1980) – Dr. Stowel
- Festspiele (1982, TV Movie) – Clown
- Liberty Belle (1983) – Le professeur allemand
- Das schöne irre Judenmädchen (1984, TV Movie) – Medardus

== Bibliography ==
- The Sorrow and the Pity : a Film by Marcel Ophüls, Introduction by Stanley Hoffmann. Filmscript translated by Mireille Johnston. Biographical and appendix material by Mireille Johnston, New York : Berkeley Publishing Corporation, 1975

== See also ==
- Hôtel Terminus – about the actual hotel
