= Ernst Heinrichsohn =

German SS, SD, and Gestapo official

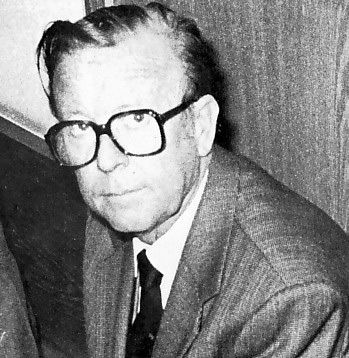
- Heinrichsohn during his trial
- Born: 13 May 1920; Berlin, Weimar Republic
- Died: October 29, 1994 (aged 74); Aschaffenburg, Germany
- Conviction: War crimes
- Penalty: Death penalty (1956) (in absentia); imprisonment 6 yrs. (1980) (released in 1982)
- SS service
- Allegiance: Nazi Germany
- Branch: Schutzstaffel
- Service years: 1933–1945
- Rank: SS-Unterscharführer
- Unit: Reich Security Main Office

Ernst Otto Eberhard Heinrichsohn (13 May 1920 – 29 October 1994) was a German lawyer and member of the SS who participated in the deportation of French Jews to Auschwitz during World War II.

== SS service ==
Heinrichsohn was drafted for military service in 1939 but dismissed as unfit. He entered law school, but was then assigned to the Reich Security Main Office. In September 1940, he became an officer cadet employed by the Jewish section of the Sicherheitspolizei (German Security Police) in France under Theodor Dannecker. His immediate superior was Heinz Röthke. Beginning in 1943, he reported to the commander of the security police, Kurt Lischka.

In 1942, Heinrichsohn organized the deportation of tens of thousands of stateless and French Jews to Auschwitz while holding the position of a junior squad leader (SS-Unterscharführer) acting as a transport clerk. In a supplement to a record of a meeting that he had had with French prefect Jean Leguay, Heinrichsohn noted: "On Friday, 28. 8. [August] 1942, 25,000 Jews have been deported." At this meeting, Heinrichsohn also reported that the arrests of the "September Programme" had been carried out jointly by "police, gendarmerie and Wehrmacht". When delays in transit developed on 30 September 1942, Heinrichsohn himself oversaw the regular trains from the Drancy internment camp, including the deportation of French Senator Pierre Massé to Auschwitz-Birkenau. On 11 November 1942, he had selected 35 bedridden, elderly people from the Rothschild Hospital, Paris to increase the number of deportees.

== Postwar career ==
After World War II, Heinrichsohn studied law in Würzburg and became a lawyer in Miltenberg. In 1952, he was elected as a CSU member to honorary position of second mayor of his residential community of Bürgstadt, the home of his wife, whom he married in 1946. After 1960, he filled the position of first mayor (also honorary). He gained a good reputation with the town residents because he succeeded in preventing the town's incorporation. He was also a deputy in the Miltenberg council.

== Prosecution ==
On 7 March 1956, Heinrichsohn was sentenced to death by a French court in absentia. A formal prosecution (and conviction) by the Allies prevented any like proceedings in the Federal Republic of Germany. This procedural issue was only cleared in 1975 (based on the reconciliation agreement of 1971), against the resistance of the FDP politician Ernst Achenbach. In 1976, an initiative of the French historian and Holocaust survivor Serge Klarsfeld made public his involvement in the Holocaust. Heinrichsohn responded with a sworn statement to the council, stating that he was not the Gestapo agent known as "Heinrichson". This affidavit was accepted not only in the community but also by the board of the CSU, whose Secretary General Edmund Stoiber did not want to interfere or prejudice a pending investigation. Heinrichsohn was re-elected with 85% of the vote and no opposition on part of the SPD when he ran again for mayor. In 1977, the incriminating documents published by Klarsfeld were discounted by the Oberlandesgericht Bamberg, which declined to strip Heinrichsohn of his law license on the strength of this evidence. In June 1978, Serge Klarsfeld organized a political demonstration of about eighty French in Miltenberg.

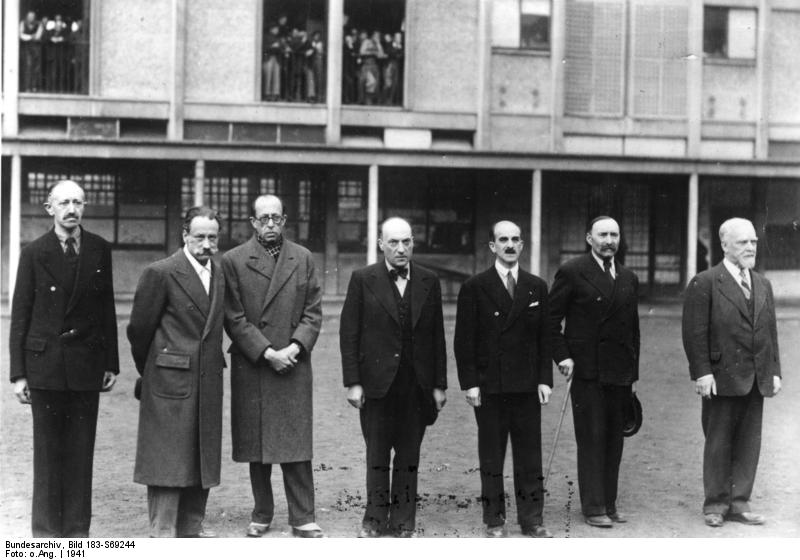
Heinrichsohn organized the railway transports of Jews from the Drancy internment camp: French lawyers detained in Drancy, 1941

In 1979, Heinrichsohn along with Kurt Lischka and Herbert Hagen was indicted for "having knowingly aided the intentional, unlawful, cruel, insidious, and basely motivated killing of human beings". The indictment was partially based on an assessment authored by Wolfgang Scheffler. Heinz Röthke had already died in 1965 without ever having been apprehended, although he also had been sentenced to death in France.

On behalf of the plaintiffs, Serge Klarsfeld had put together a collection of documents from those found in Paris Gestapo files, which among other things showed Heinrichsohn's involvement in the deportation of Greek Jews and of Jewish children. Heinrichsohn's lawyer Richard Huth had stated in court that Klarsfeld (who was a Jew of Romanian birth) had no agency to represent French Jews. Heinrichsohn had declared in court that he felt no sense of guilt because he had only been apprised of the Jews' murder after the war had ended, and that he merely selected Jews for work assignments. However, Heinrichsohn was identified by witnesses; it was demonstrated that he had had small children and the sick deported. The historian and Holocaust survivor Georges Wellers was able to relate particulars about Heinrichsohn by quoting from a document describing the conditions in Drancy during Heinrichsohn's tenure, which he had already penned in 1946.

On 11 February 11, 1980, the Circuit Court of Cologne sentenced Heinrichsohn to six years in prison, Lischka to ten, and Hagen to twelve years. The residents of Bürgstadt had rallied around their mayor during the trial, and took up a collection to provide 200 DM in bail to allow him to move freely during the appeal. However, he was arrested in March 1980 because of an alleged flight risk. The Federal Court upheld the verdicts on 16 July 1981. On 3 June 3, 1982, he was released early by decision of the Oberlandesgericht Bamberg, after the Landgericht Bayreuth rejected his release in March 1982 because he had not yet served two thirds of his sentence. The remainder of his sentence was remitted in 1987. Heinrichsohn professed no guilt and was even charged with a further count of perjury in the aftermath, due to having testified at the trial of Modest Graf von Korff that he had been completely unaware of the murder of Jews. He eventually lived with his new wife in a town close to Bürgstadt.

The opening of the trial in Cologne had been a late vindication of the efforts of Serge Klarsfeld and his wife, Beate Klarsfeld, to bring German and French Holocaust perpetrators to justice. The relatively heavy prison sentences for the defendants was a novelty in the case-law of the Federal Republic of Germany.

Bürgstadt's residents remained convinced that Heinrichsohn was innocent, as journalist Lea Rosh documented in several television features for ''Kennzeichen D''.

== Sources ==
- Serge Klarsfeld: Vichy – Auschwitz. Die "Endlösung der Judenfrage" in Frankreich, Aus dem Französischen von Ahlrich Meyer, Nördlingen 1989; Neuauflage 2007 bei WBG, Darmstadt, ISBN 978-3-534-20793-0.
- Bernhard Brunner: Der Frankreich-Komplex. Die nationalsozialistischen Verbrechen in Frankreich und die Justiz der Bundesrepublik Deutschland, Wallstein, Göttingen 2004, ISBN 3-89244-693-8.
- Ahlrich Meyer: Täter im Verhör. Die "Endlösung der Judenfrage" in Frankreich 1940–1944, Darmstadt 2005, ISBN 3-534-17564-6
- Ernst Klee: Das Personenlexikon zum Dritten Reich. Wer war was vor und nach 1945? S. Fischer, Frankfurt 2003, ISBN 3-596-16048-0.
- Claudia Moisel: Frankreich und die deutschen Kriegsverbrechen. Die strafrechtliche Verfolgung der deutschen Kriegs- und NS-Verbrechen nach 1945, Wallstein, Göttingen 2004 3-89244-749-7.
- Michael Mayer: Staaten als Täter. Ministerialbürokratie und "Judenpolitik" in NS-Deutschland und Vichy-Frankreich. Ein Vergleich. Mit einem Vorwort von Horst Möller und Georges-Henri Soutou. Oldenbourg, München 2010, ISBN 978-3-486-58945-0 (zugl. Diss. München 2007).
- Rudolf Hirsch: Um die Endlösung. Prozessberichte über den Lischka-Prozess in Köln und den Auschwitz-Prozess in Frankfurt/M.. Greifenverlag, Rudolstadt 1982. Neuausgabe: Um die Endlösung. Prozeßberichte, Dietz, Berlin 2001, ISBN 3-320-02020-X.
