= Neunkirchen, Lower Franconia =

Neunkirchen
- Municipality
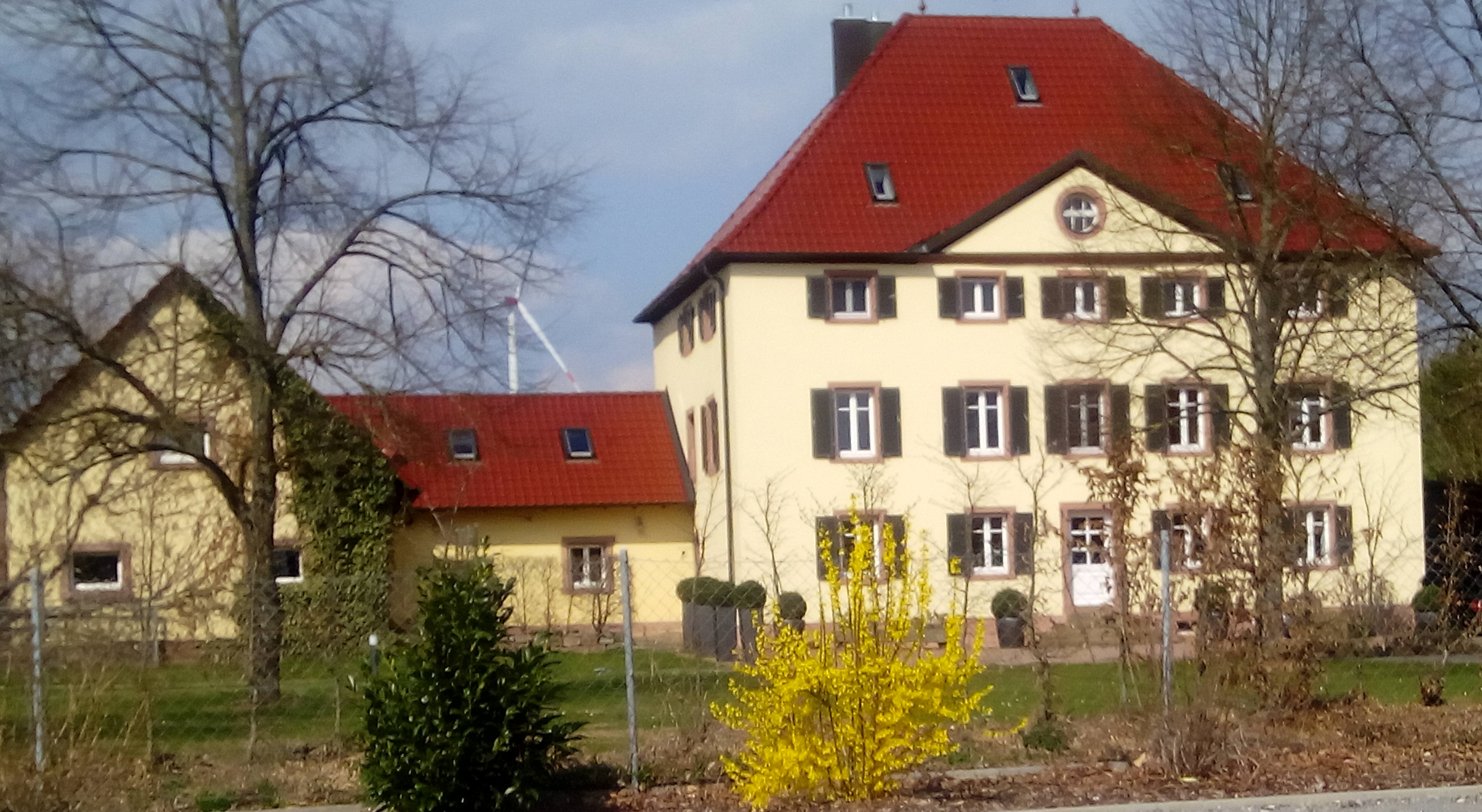

- Coat of arms

- Location of Neunkirchen within Miltenberg district
- Interactive map of Neunkirchen
- Location within Germany Location within Bavaria
- Coordinates: 49°47′59″N 09°24′00″E
- Country: Germany
- State: Bavaria
- Admin. region: Unterfranken
- District: Miltenberg
- Municipal assoc.: Erftal
- Subdivisions: 3 Ortsteile

Government
  - Mayor (2020–26): Wolfgang Seitz

Area
  - Total: 16.64 km^{2} (6.42 sq mi)
- Elevation: 329 m (1,079 ft)

Population (2025-12-31)
  - Total: 1,437
  - Density: 86.36/km^{2} (223.7/sq mi)
- Time zone: UTC+01:00 (CET)
  - Summer (DST): UTC+02:00 (CEST)
- Postal codes: 63930
- Dialling codes: 09378
- Vehicle registration: MIL
- Website: www.neunkirchen-unterfranken.de

Neunkirchen (German: [ˈnɔʏnkɪʁçn̩]) is a municipality in the Miltenberg district in the Regierungsbezirk of Lower Franconia (Unterfranken) in Bavaria, Germany and a member of the Verwaltungsgemeinschaft (Administrative Community) of Erftal, whose seat is in Bürgstadt.

== Geography ==
=== Location ===
The rural residential community of Neunkirchen lies in the Geo-Naturpark Bergstraße-Odenwald, between Wertheim and Miltenberg.

=== Constituent communities ===
Neunkirchen's Ortsteile are Neunkirchen, Richelbach and Umpfenbach.

== History ==
In 1232, Neunkirchen had its first documentary mention, and for the longest time in its history had the Archbishopric of Mainz as its overlord. It was said to be a well-off farming community.

=== Amalgamations ===
The greater community of Neunkirchen came into being through the merger of the formerly self-administering communities of Neunkirchen, Richelbach and Umpfenbach on 1 July 1975.

== Politics ==
=== Town council ===
The council is made up of 13 council members, counting the part-time mayor.

| | WG Umpfenbach | WG | WG Richelbach | Total |
| 2002 | 4 | 5 | 4 | 13 seats |

(as at municipal election held on 3 March 2002)

=== Coat of arms ===
The community's arms might be described thus: Per chevron embowed, argent dexter a helm in profile and sinister the head of an abbess's staff gules, and gules a wheel spoked of six of the first.

The knight's helmet stands for Umpfenbach, much of whose mediaeval history was characterized by Imperial, knightly fiefholders, the most important among whom were the Barons of Gudenus. They acquired the community quite late in Imperial history, in 1775 and rendered service thereto on into the 20th century. The abbess's staff refers to Richelbach's relationship with the Altmünster Convent, which was founded in the 8th century and known to have been in Riclelbach by the 13th century. The founding Abbess, Bihildis, is Richelbach's church patron. The Wheel of Mainz, and also the tinctures argent and gules (silver and red) refer to the community's long association with the Electoral state of Mainz, which was landlord to almost all of Neunkirchen and the authority that dispensed law.

The arms have been borne since 1982.

== Famous people ==
=== Honorary citizens ===
- 1898: Bishop Ferdinand von Schlör, Richelbach
- 1967: Headteacher Alfred Hauck, Richelbach
- 1975: Former Mayor Helmut Schell, Neunkirchen
- 1979: Father Georg Zenkert, Neunkirchen
- 1985: Former Mayor Rudolf Ditter, Richelbach
- 2003: Honorary Councillor Fritz Schmidt, Umpfenbach
- 2006: Honorary Councillor Alfons Wolf, Neunkirchen
