= Röthke =

Röthke is a German surname. Notable people with the surname include:

- Heinz Röthke (1912–1966), German SS officer
- Lynn Roethke (born 1961), American judoka
- Rene Röthke (born 1982), German ice hockey player
- Theodore Roethke (1908–1963), American poet
