= Herbert Hagen =

SS Officer and Holocaust perpetrator

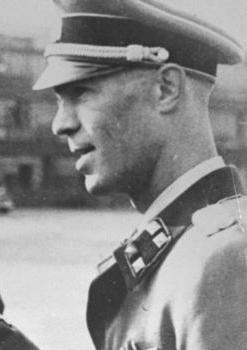
- Herbert Hagen, on 1 May 1943 in Paris
- Born: 20 September 1913; Neumünster, German Empire
- Died: 7 August 1999 (aged 85); Rüthen, Germany
- Conviction: War crimes
- Penalty: Life hard labour (1955) (in absentia); imprisonment 12 years (1980); (released after 4 years)
- SS service
- Allegiance: Nazi Germany
- Branch: Schutzstaffel
- Service years: 1933–1945
- Rank: SS-Sturmbannführer

Herbert Martin Hagen (20 September 1913 – 7 August 1999) was a German SS-Sturmbannführer of Nazi Germany and a convicted war criminal. Hagen served as personal assistant to the SS police chief in Paris Carl Oberg, heading the Gestapo department. Hagen was captured in 1945, but released in 1948. In 1955 he was sentenced to life imprisonment in absentia in France, after he was found guilty of being instrumental in the deportation of the Jews from France; nonetheless, he managed to avoid going to prison, and became a prominent West German industrialist. In 1980 after a change in the law to allow retrial of cases handled abroad, he was sentenced to 12 years in prison by a Cologne court, for his key role in the deportation of 73,000 Jews to the Auschwitz death camp. Hagen was released after serving only four years of prison. He died in Rüthen in 1999.

== Biography ==
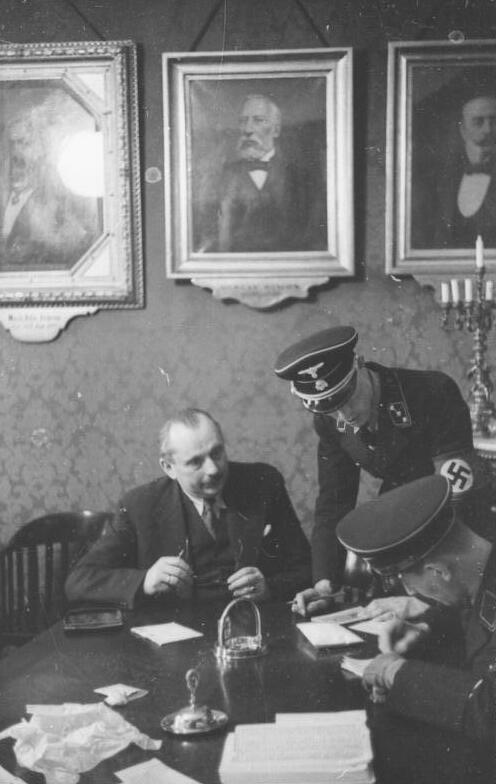
Herbert Hagen (In the middle, standing) in Vienna, with Adolf Eichmann on the right and Josef Löwenherz on the left, March 1938

Herbert Hagen was born on 20 September 1913, in Neumünster, Schleswig-Holstein, he joined the SS in October 1933 in Kiel.

From 1940 Hagen held positions in the Security Police in France, based in Bordeaux. He instituted measures to deport Jews; in December 1941, Hagen set up an internment camp for Jews in Mérignac. On 24 October 1941, in the Souges internment camp, Hagen was directly responsible for the execution by hanging of 50 hostages, thirty-five of them came from the Mérignac camp. On 5 May 1942, Hagen, who had previously served as a Nazi police official in Poland, was appointed to the position of political assistant of Carl Oberg, who commanded the SS and police forces in France, overseeing anti-Jewish matters as well as security under SS-Obersturmbannführer Helmut Knochen. Fluent in French, he was able to communicate Nazi demands directly to Vichy about the deportation of Jews and the fight against the resistance. In September 1944, he was transferred to Carinthia, Austria where he commanded an Einsatzkommando mobile death squad on the Yugoslav border.

== Capture, trials, sentence and death ==
On 13 May 1945, Hagen was captured by the British in Klagenfurt. He was handed by the British to the French occupation forces in November 1946, but was released on 4 March 1948. Because he belonged to the SS and SD, Hagen was sentenced to one and a half years in prison on 5 May 1948, which was considered served due to his time in internment. He managed to convince the court that he had only been active in intelligence analysis and espionage and denied knowing what was happening to those deported. The Law on Exemption from Punishment (amnesty law) of 1954 allowed him to find employment at a Cologne company and start a new career in industry. On 18 March 1955, in light of new evidence, a military court in Paris found him guilty of being instrumental in the deportation of the Jews from France, he was sentenced (in absentia) to lifelong forced labour. In 1964 he became managing director of a respected apparatus, equipment and service company in Warstein.

French lawyer and Nazi hunter Serge Klarsfeld, whose own father had been an Auschwitz victim, managed to track him down, alongside two other Nazi war criminals, after years of investigation. In 1980, after 15 months of trial, Herbert Hagen was tried and convicted by the 15th criminal chamber of the Cologne Higher Regional Court and sentenced to twelve years in prison on charges of ordering and administrating the deportation of Jews. During the trial, Klarsfeld, who had amassed thirteen volumes of documents linking the defendants to individual deportations, represented the French victims. The court learned that Hagen knew about the Nazi program to exterminate the Jews, was a central figure in its implementation and was heavily involved in the deportation of Jews from Occupied France. (Note: two other former Paris Gestapo men were tried and sentenced at the same time: Kurt Lischka, Gestapo chief in Paris, who was sentenced to 10 years, and Ernst Heinrichsohn, who worked in the Gestapo's "Jewish affairs" department in Paris, sentenced to six years.) It was concluded that during his period in command, 70,790 Jews were sent to concentration camps where at least 35,000 were murdered in the gas chamber.

Herbert Hagen served only four years of his twelve years sentence in prison before being set free, he died on 7 August 1999, in Rüthen.
