= Burgstadt =

Burgstadt may refer to:

- Bürgstadt, the community in the Miltenberg district, Lower Franconia, Germany
- Burgstädt, town in the district of Mittelsachsen, in the Free State of Saxony, Germany
