= Erftal =

- Verwaltungsgemeinschaft
- Location of Erftal within Miltenberg district
- Interactive map of Erftal
- Location within Germany Location within Bavaria
- Coordinates: 49°43′N 9°16′E
- Country: Germany
- State: Bavaria
- Admin. region: Lower Franconia
- District: Miltenberg
- Seat: Kleinheubach
- Subdivisions: 2 municipalities

Area
  - Total: 340.2 km^{2} (131.4 sq mi)

Population (2025-12-31)
  - Total: 5,585
  - Density: 16.42/km^{2} (42.52/sq mi)
- Time zone: UTC+01:00 (CET)
  - Summer (DST): UTC+02:00 (CEST)
- Website: vg-erftal.de

Erftal is a Verwaltungsgemeinschaft (municipal association) in the district of Miltenberg in Bavaria, Germany. Its seat is in Kleinheubach. It takes its name from the river Erf.

It consists of the following municipalities:

1. Bürgstadt
2. Neunkirchen
