= Zum Riesen =

The Giant
- Zum Riesen
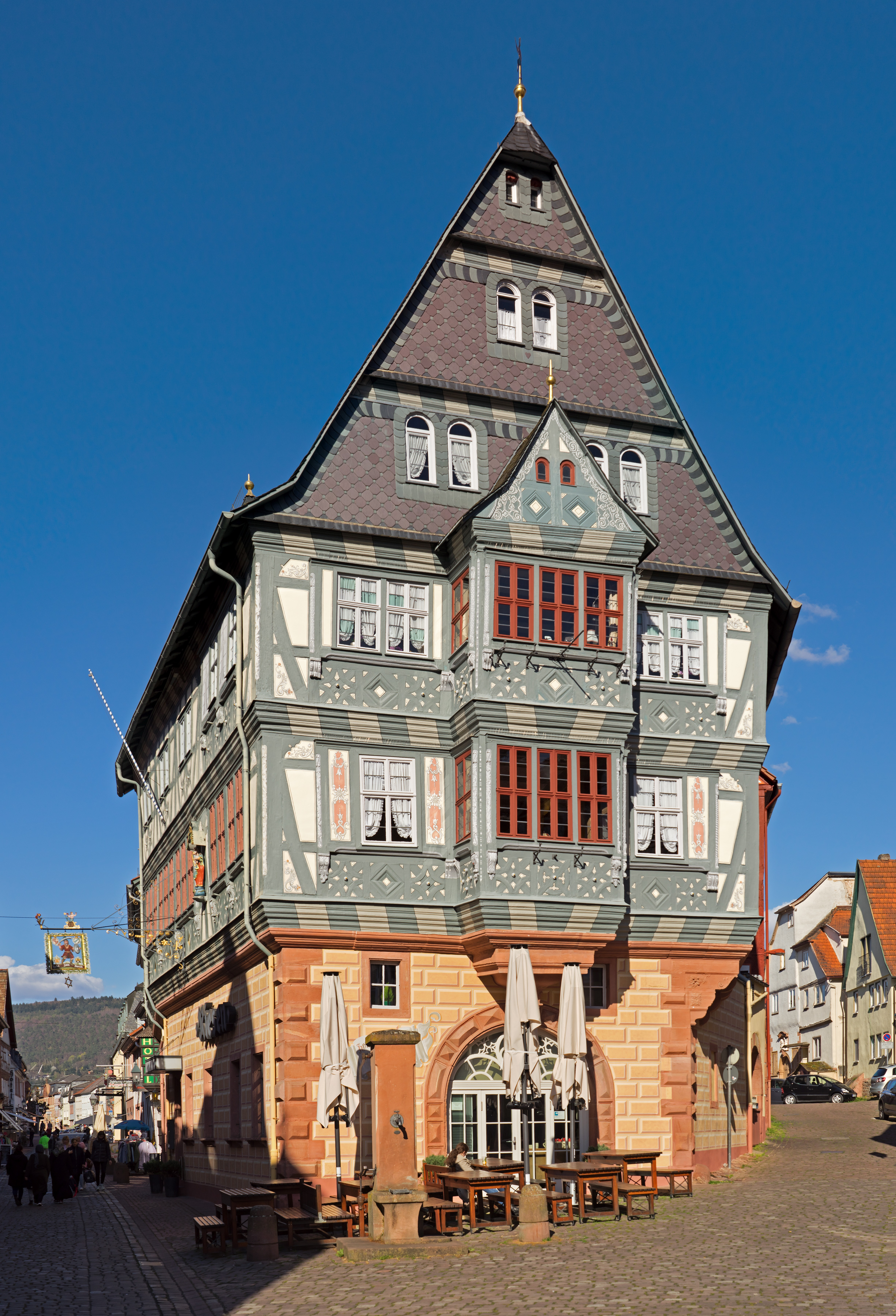
- Zum Riesen hotel, 2023
- Hotel chain: Faust Miltenberg

General information
- Architectural style: Renaissance
- Location: Hauptstraße 97, Miltenberg, Germany
- Coordinates: 49.7002°N 9.2562°E
- Named for: Trestam zum Riesen
- Construction started: 1411
- Renovated: 1589, 1948, 1970
- Renovation cost: DM 250,000 (1948)

Technical details
- Material: Half-timbered

Design and construction
- Architect: Jacob Stoer

Other information
- Seating capacity: 190
- Number of rooms: 18

Website
- www.hotel-riesen-miltenberg.de

Zum Riesen (The Giant) is a hotel in Miltenberg, Germany and is one of the oldest hotels in the country, dating back to at least 1411.

== History ==
Records show that a building existed on the site for some time previous, though the earliest known mention of the hotel is the registration of Trestam zum Riesen as landlord in 1411, making it one of the oldest continuously operating hotels in the world. The hotel was rebuilt in the half-timbered, Renaissance style in 1590 by architect Jacob Stoer, using 100 logs donated by the city council. The building has been renovated a number of times since; first in 1948 for DM 250,000; and again in 1970 after being purchased for DM 194,000. In 2001 it was purchased by local chain Faust Brauhaus.

A number of famous guests have stayed at Zum Riesen; including two Holy Roman Emperors, Frederick Barbarossa and Charles IV; the leaders from both sides of the Thirty Years' War, Johann Tserclaes and Gustavus Adolphus; and Elvis Presley.

== See also ==
- List of oldest companies
