= Sons and Daughters of Jewish Deportees from France =

The Sons and Daughters of Jewish Deportees from France (French: Fils et filles de déportés juifs de France, FFDJF) is a French association of descendants of Jews deported from or displaced in France during the Nazi German occupation of France (1940–1944), during the Holocaust. Serge Klarsfeld—an academic historian specializing in the fate of Jews in France during World War II—founded the organization in 1979 and continues to serve as its president.

== Function and evolution ==
The Sons and Daughters of Jewish Deportees from France publishes the Bulletin de liaison des Fils et Filles des Deportés Juifs de France (Liaison bulletin of the organization). In doing so the organisation draws on its members and a library of evidence to research and publish notable cases of French and German Holocaust survivors, unidentified fates and continue to relate unpublished reflections on atrocities.

The organization in 1981 inaugurated a memorial in Israel of deported and displaced French Jews which bears the name, date and place of birth of 80,000 French victims of the Nazi extermination. About 80,000 trees form a forest of remembrance. During a reading of the names of French Jews at the Paris Shoah Memorial, Serge Klarsfeld stated, "We are refusing to allow the victims [to] remain anonymous."

== Presidents ==
=== Serge Klarsfeld ===
Klasfeld was an advocate at the Court of Appeal of Paris, has written books on the fate of French Jews during World War II and has taken an active role in bringing Nazi and Vichy officials to trial for crimes committed in France during the war. Klarsfeld was arrested in Germany and Syria in trying to have Nazi criminal Alois Brunner extradited to France.
