= Monbrunn =

Coordinates: 49°41′N 9°15′E

Monbrunn is a small village in Lower Franconia in the north of Bavaria in Germany.

It has approximately 70 inhabitants. In 2007 it was chosen as one of the most beautiful villages in Bavaria. Monbrunn is a Stadtteil of Miltenberg.

The village is located in a pastoral setting on top of a hill of the Mittelgebirge Odenwald.

The surrounding area has agricultural activities.
