= Erf (river) =

River in Germany

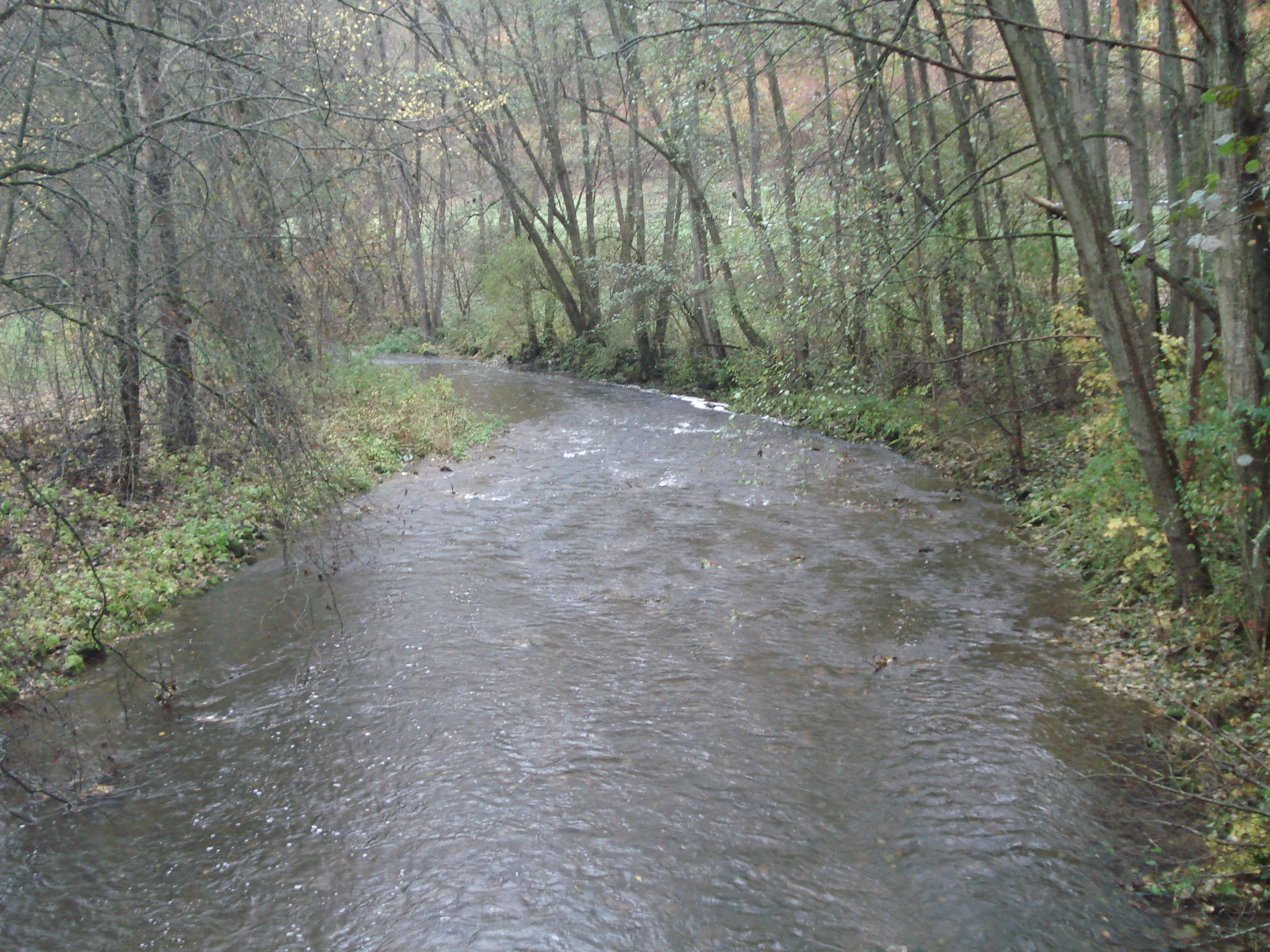
- The Erf at Eichenbühl

Location
- Country: Germany
- States: Bavaria; Baden-Württemberg

Physical characteristics
- Mouth
  - location: Main
  - coordinates: 49.7115°N 9.2612°E
- Length: 40.2 km (25.0 mi)
- Basin size: 248 km^{2} (96 sq mi)

Basin features
- Progression: Main→ Rhine→ North Sea

Erf is a river of Bavaria and Baden-Württemberg, Germany. In Baden-Württemberg, it is called Erfa. It flows into the Main in Bürgstadt.

== See also ==
- List of rivers of Baden-Württemberg
- List of rivers of Bavaria
