= Kurt Lischka =

German SS, SD, and Gestapo official

- Born: 16 August 1909; Breslau, Prussia, Germany
- Died: 5 April 1989 (aged 79); Brühl, North Rhine-Westphalia, West Germany
- Conviction: War crimes
- Penalty: Life imprisonment (1955) (in absentia); 10 years imprisonment (1980)
- SS service
- Allegiance: Nazi Germany
- Branch: Schutzstaffel
- Service years: 1933–1945
- Rank: SS-Obersturmbannführer
- Commands: Gestapo chief, Cologne; Kommandeur of SiPo and SD, Paris

Kurt Paul Werner Lischka (16 August 1909 – 5 April 1989) was a German SS official, Gestapo chief and commandant of the Security police (Sicherheitspolizei; SiPo) and Security Service (Sicherheitsdienst; SD) in Paris during the German occupation of France in World War II.

== Biography ==
Lischka was the son of a bank official. He studied law and political science at the universities of Breslau and Berlin. After obtaining his law degree, he worked in district courts and in the Provincial Court of Appeal in Breslau (today, Wrocław). Lischka joined the SS on 1 June 1933, reached the rank of SS-Sturmbannführer (major) in 1938 and SS-Obersturmbannführer (lieutenant colonel) on 20 April 1942. On 1 September 1935, Lischka joined the Gestapo and, in January 1940, became head of the Gestapo in Cologne.

Lischka headed the operation that resulted in the incarceration of over 30,000 German Jews immediately following the mass destruction of Jewish property in the Kristallnacht pogrom of 9–10 November 1938. In November 1940, he was appointed the Kommandeur der Sicherheitspolizei und des SD (KdS) in Paris. In this post, Lischka was responsible for the largest single mass deportation of Jews in occupied France.

== Capture and death ==
Lischka was captured and imprisoned in France in 1945, then extradited to Czechoslovakia in 1947 for war crimes but released on 22 August 1950. He settled in West Germany. Though a Paris court sentenced him in absentia to life imprisonment, Lischka lived out more than 25 years in freedom, working under his own name in Germany as, among other positions, a judge.

As a result of the activities of French lawyer and Nazi hunters Serge Klarsfeld and wife Beate Klarsfeld, Lischka was eventually arrested in Cologne. Lischka was sentenced to a ten-year prison term on 2 February 1980 alongside two other former Gestapo men: Herbert Hagen, personal assistant of SS police chief in Paris, and Ernst Heinrichsohn, who worked in the Gestapo's "Jewish affairs" department in Paris, sentenced to six years. Following Lischka's early release on health grounds in 1985, he died in a nursing home on 5 April 1989 in Brühl.
