= Rene Röthke =

German ice hockey player

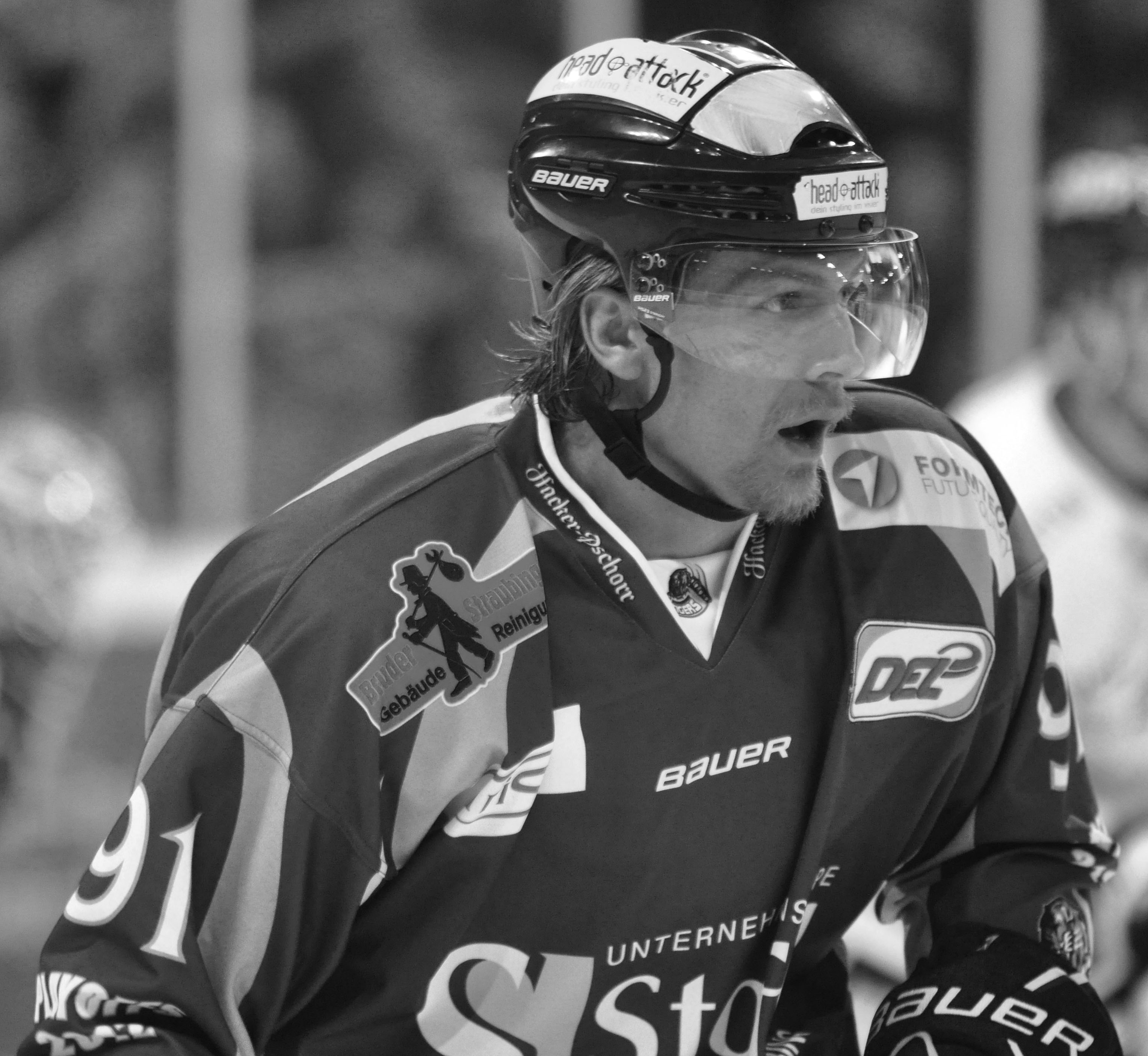
- Born: July 27, 1982 (age 42); Berlin, Germany
- Height: 5 ft 11 in (180 cm)
- Weight: 187 lb (85 kg; 13 st 5 lb)
- Position: Right wing
- Shoots: Right
- DEL2 team Former teams: Deggendorfer SC; Berlin Capitals; Augsburger Panther; Eisbären Berlin; Hamburg Freezers; Hannover Scorpions; ERC Ingolstadt; Straubing Tigers
- Playing career: 2001–present

Rene Röthke (born July 27, 1982) is a German professional ice hockey player who currently plays for Deggendorfer SC in the DEL2. On February 10, 2016, he agreed to return for his 8th season with the Straubing Tigers for the 2016–17 campaign.
