= Serge Klarsfeld =

French jurist (born 1935)

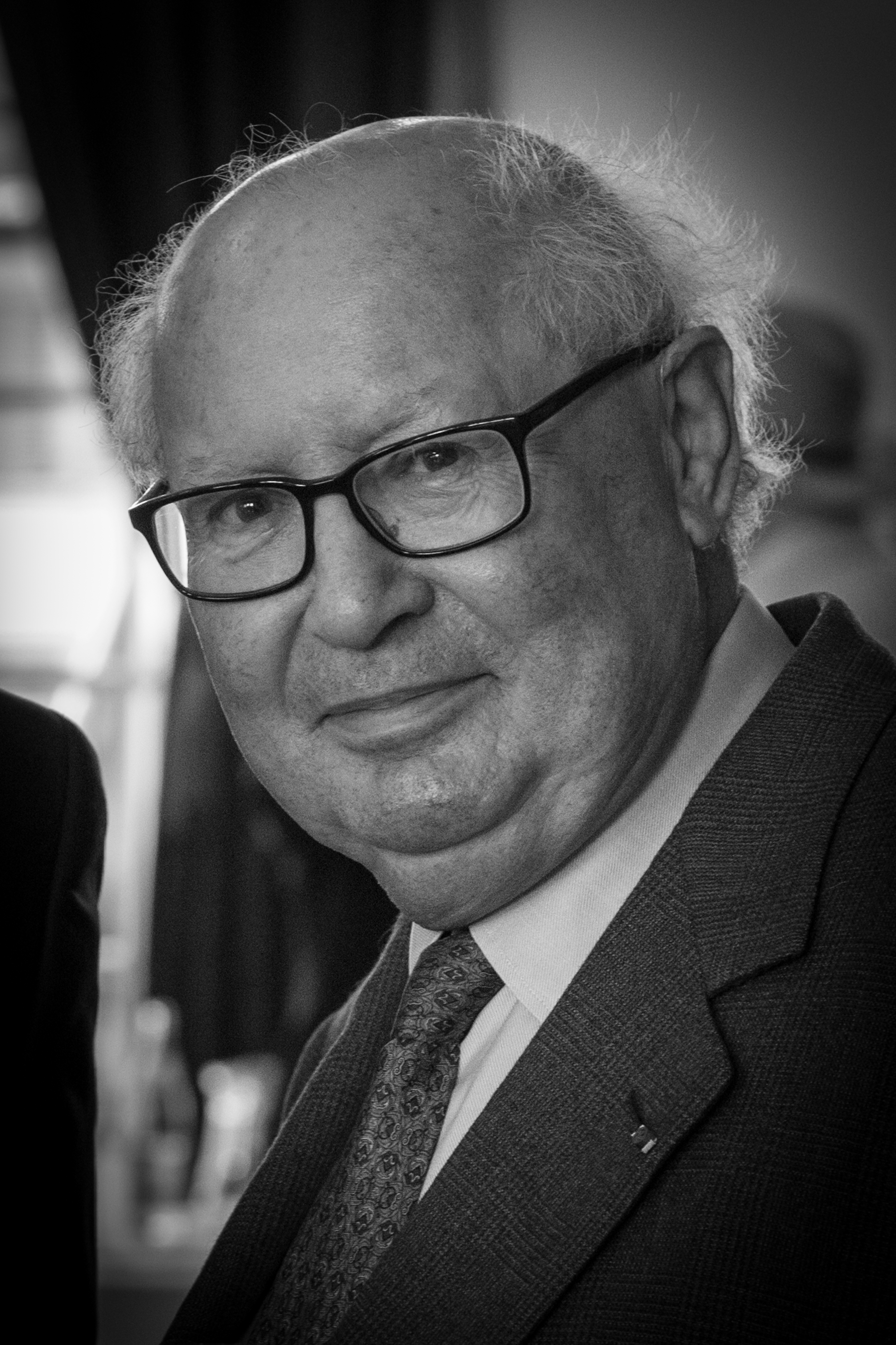
- Klarsfeld in 2015
- Born: 17 September 1935 (age 91); Bucharest, Romania
- Citizenship: Romania; France
- Known for: French activist and Nazi hunter
- Spouse: Beate Klarsfeld (m. 1963)
- Children: 2
- Website: klarsfeldfoundation.org

Serge Klarsfeld (born 17 September 1935) is a Romanian-born French activist and Nazi hunter known for documenting the Holocaust in order to establish the record and to enable the prosecution of war criminals. Since the 1960s, he has made notable efforts to commemorate the Jewish victims of German-occupied France and has been a supporter of Israel.

== Early years and later life ==
Klarsfeld was born in Bucharest into a family of Bessarabian Jews that migrated to France before the Second World War began. His family was from Cahul, in present-day Moldova. At home, the Klarsfelds spoke Russian, Romanian and French. In 1943, his father was arrested by the Schutzstaffel in Nice during a roundup ordered by Alois Brunner. Deported to the Auschwitz concentration camp, Klarsfeld's father died there. The young Klarsfeld was cared for in a home for Jewish children operated by the Œuvre de secours aux enfants, a French Jewish humanitarian organisation. His mother and sister also survived the war in Vichy France and were helped by the underground French Resistance beginning in late 1943. The Klarsfelds returned to Bucharest in 1946 and Serge began to study at the French Lyceum there. However, after the 1946 Romanian general election, Serge's mother realized that the communists would take over Romania, so they returned to France.

Klarsfeld married Beate Künzel in 1963 and settled in Paris. Their son, Arno Klarsfeld (born 1965), is a lawyer who worked for Nicolas Sarkozy but later became active in far-right politics and voicefully supporting Putin during the Russian invasion of Ukraine. Serge Klarsfeld helped found and led the Sons and Daughters of Jewish Deportees from France (Association des fils et filles des déportés juifs de France, FFDJF). It is one of the groups that has documented cases and located former German and French officials for prosecution, such as Klaus Barbie, René Bousquet, Jean Leguay, Maurice Papon, and Paul Touvier, who had been implicated in the deaths of hundreds of thousands of French and foreign Jews during the Second World War. The Klarsfelds were among organised groups who filed cases decades after the war, sometimes as late as the 1990s, against such officials for crimes against humanity. In the years before 1989 and the dissolution of the Soviet Union, Klarsfeld and his wife frequently protested against the Eastern Bloc's support for the Palestine Liberation Organization and anti-Zionism.

== Activism ==
=== Early activism ===
In 2012, the archivist of the Stasi revealed that Beate Klarsfeld's attack on Kurt Georg Kiesinger, the then German chancellor, by publicly slapping him on 7 November 1968, was carried out in agreement with and the support of the government of East Germany, which was conducting a campaign against West German politicians (Braunbuch). Klarsfeld's wife was paid 2,000 DM by the Stasi for her actions. Both Klarsfelds were revealed to have been regular Stasi contacts. According to the State Commissioner for the Stasi Archives of Saxony, they cooperated with the Stasi in the 1960s in blackmailing West German politicians for Second World War activities.

In 1974, the Klarsfelds were convicted in West Germany on felony charges of the attempted kidnapping of Kurt Lischka, a former Gestapo chief whose prosecution in Germany was prevented by legal technicalities, in Cologne in order to transport him to France for prosecution. After conviction of felony charges, they were each sentenced to two months in prison. Following international protests, the sentence was suspended. Activism by the Klarsfelds and by descendants of Lischka's victims eventually resulted in changes to the laws. In 1980, Lischka was convicted of a felony in West Germany and sentenced to prison, together with his co-defendants: Lischka to ten years of imprisonment, Hagen and Heinrichsohn to twelve and six years respectively. The Klarsfelds' activities and methods also generated controversy. On 9 July 1979, the Klarsfelds were the targets of a car bombing at their home in France. No one was in the car when the bomb detonated, and no one was injured in the vicinity of the blast. According to the Klarsfelds, individuals purporting to represent the Nazi ODESSA claimed responsibility for the attack.

=== Later activism ===
The Klarsfelds are notable in the postwar decades for having been involved in hunting and finding German Nazis and French Vichy officials responsible for the worst abuses of the Holocaust, in order to prosecute them for alleged war crimes. Several officials were indicted due in part to the work of the Klarsfelds. They included Klaus Barbie (convicted in 1987), Jean Leguay (died in 1989, with French judiciary officially stating after his death that his involvement in crimes against humanity had been ascertained beyond doubt), René Bousquet (assassinated while set on trial in 1993), Paul Touvier (convicted in 1994), and Maurice Papon (convicted in 1998). In the 1970s, the Klarsfelds considered kidnapping Barbie in much the same way the Mossad did Adolf Eichmann but the plan fell through. They decided instead to bring international pressure to force his extradition. By 1995, only four senior French Vichy officials had been indicted for war crimes, and only Touvier had stood trial.

The Klarsfelds continued to publicize the wartime activities of prominent politicians in Germany and Austria. In 1986, the Klarsfelds campaigned against Kurt Waldheim, a former United Nations Secretary-General who was elected president of Austria amid allegations that he had covered up his wartime activities as an officer in the Wehrmacht. In 1996, during the warfare in the former Yugoslavia, the Klarsfelds joined the outcry against Radovan Karadžić and Ratko Mladić for alleged war crimes and genocide of Bosnian Muslims. In December 2009, Klarsfeld defied an existing consensus within the Jewish community by saying that the beatification of Pope Pius XII was an internal matter of the Church. He said that Jews should not get too involved in the process. Many protested the beatification on the grounds that Pius XII had contributed to the persecution of Jews throughout Europe, and had not brought the power of the Church against the Nazis.

=== Activism in France ===
In 1979, the Klarsfelds created the Sons and Daughters of Jewish Deportees from France (FFDJF). It defends the cause of the descendants of deportees, to have the events recognised and to prosecute people responsible. In 1981, the association commissioned a memorial in Israel to the deported French Jews; it bears the name, date and place of birth of 80,000 French victims of the Nazi extermination. About 80,000 trees were planted to shape a forest of remembrance. Klarsfeld is also vice-president of the Fondation pour la Mémoire de la Shoah. In 1989, FFDJF was one of the groups to file a case against René Bousquet, head of the French Police in the Vichy government, for crimes against humanity. He was indicted by the French government in 1991 but was killed in 1993 shortly before his trial was to begin. Former French president Jacques Chirac acknowledged the nation's responsibility for the fate of Jews in its territory during the Second World War, and the government passed a law on 13 July 2000 to establish compensation for orphans whose parents were victims of antisemitic persecution. The Klarsfelds' work on behalf of the descendants of Jewish deportees had been formally recognised by Chirac in a 1995 speech when he was president. In January 2012, the Klarsfelds, along with prominent French-Armenian singer Charles Aznavour, director Robert Guédiguian, and philosophers Bernard-Henri Lévy and Michel Onfray, signed an appeal to the French Parliament to ratify a bill to establish penalties for people who deny the Armenian genocide. After six decades, the Klarsfelds were noted for their swing away from Nazi hunting to a more-general push for social justice (fight for human life, freedom, and social protection) in opposition to the modern right and neo-fascism.

In 2022, Klarsfeld co-signed an article in Libération headlined "No to Le Pen, daughter of racism and antisemitism". In an interview to La Stampa ahead of the 2024 French legislative election, Klarsfeld stated that both he and his wife had voted for Emmanuel Macron to stop the far-right party of Marine Le Pen in 2017 and 2022 but that, while he would keep voting for Macron's party in the first round, he would vote for Le Pen and the National Rally, a party founded by former members of the collaborationist Vichy regime, against the left-wing alliance, the New Popular Front, which condemned the 2023 Hamas-led attack on Israel. He argued that the National Rally was no longer a far-right party but a populist group that supports Jews and Israel, and claimed that the New Popular Front was dominated by La France Insoumise and Jean-Luc Mélenchon; he claimed that the radical left had moved to antisemitism and anti-Zionism, and that this represented "a danger", saying that Mélenchon was antisemitic and against Israel, and that he was "sure of this". In a June 2024 La Chaîne Info interview, Klarsfeld confirmed that he had made up his mind if he were forced to choose between the two, saying: "The National Rally supports the Jews, supports the State of Israel, and it's quite normal given the activity I've had over the past 60 years, that between an antisemitic party and a pro-Jewish party, I'll vote for the pro-Jewish one." In response, an article published by Le Monde headlined "Serge Klarsfeld short-circuits history to turn it upside-down", written by academic Michèle Cohen-Halimi, author Francis Cohen, and movie director Leopold von Verschuer, called his "unexpected legitimization of the National Rally" a betrayal of the victims of the Nazis that his own research had uncovered, asking "Is it enough for the National Rally to no longer call itself anti-Semitic to no longer be anti-Semitic?".

== Works ==
In 1978, Klarsfeld published Mémorial de la Déportation des Juifs de France (Memorial of the Deportation of the Jews of France), a book listing the names of more than 80,000 Jews deported from France to Nazi concentration camps or killed in France. Copies of the original lists that were typed up for each deportation train, found by the Klarsfelds in an archive of the Jewish community in Paris, were the basis for the name, place, date of birth and nationality of all deportees, who were listed according to each deportation train. The book records more than 75,700 Jews who were deported to the concentration camps from France and establishes that just 2,564 of the deportees survived the war. Most of the deportees were sent from the transit camp at Drancy, ranging in age from newly born to 93 and originating from 37 countries, the most from France (22,193) and Poland (14,459), with a small number from the United States (10) and even one from Tahiti.

In 2012, Klarsfeld published an updated version of the Memorial of the Deportation of the Jews of France, adding women's maiden names, deportees last address in France, and the transit or internment camp they went through. This list is sorted in alphabetic order. From 2018, this memorial is available as an online search engine. Klarsfeld also wrote a preface to Une adolescence perdue dans la nuit des camps by Henri Kichka. Klarsfeld and his wife co-wrote an autobiography, Hunting the Truth: Memoirs of Beate and Serge Klarsfeld, published in 2018.

== Cooperation with the Stasi ==
Since the reunification of Germany and the opening of Stasi files, Lutz Rathenow, the State Commissioner for the Stasi Archives of Saxony, stated in 2012 that Klarsfeld's wife had cooperated with the Stasi of East Germany in the 1960s. They gave her material containing incriminating information about the wartime activities of West German politicians. The cooperation of both Klarsfelds with the Stasi and their status as contacts was documented in a book by former Stasi officers Günter Bohnsack and Herbert Brehmer.

== Honours ==
Recognition for the works of the Klarsfelds included France's Legion of Honour in 1984. On 7 July 2010, Klarsfeld was awarded the title of Commander of the Legion of Honour by the then French prime minister François Fillon at Hôtel Matignon, the official residence of France's prime minister. In January 2014, the Klarsfelds' Legion of Honour ranks were upgraded as he became Grand Officer. In May 2015, the Klarsfelds received the Order of Merit of the Federal Republic of Germany (Federal Cross of Merit, first class) in recognition of their efforts to bring Nazi war criminals to justice. On 26 October 2015, the UNESCO designated the Klarsfelds as "Honorary Ambassadors and Special Envoys for Education about the Holocaust and the Prevention of Genocide". On 20 November 2015, Klarsfeld was made the Officer of the Order of Saint-Charles. On 27 May 2024, French President Emmanuel Macron promoted him to Grand-Cross of the Legion of Honour.

== Representation in other media ==
The Klarsfelds' activities related to finding Nazi war criminals were the subject of Nazi Hunter: The Beate Klarsfeld Story (1986), an American made-for-TV film. The 2001 documentary Marlene Dietrich: Her Own Song, a Turner Classic Movies Production about Dietrich mentions her support of Klarsfeld's anti-Nazi activities, while the 2008 drama Manhunt (La traque) was a French made-for-TV film, written by Alexandra Deman and Laurent Jaoui and directed by Laurent Jaoui, based on the Klarsfelds. The documentary La traque des nazis, (2007) studied Simon Wiesenthal's and the Klarsfelds' activities.

== See also ==
- Michel Thomas
- Efraim Zuroff

== Bibliography of works in English ==
- The Children of Izieu: A Human Tragedy. New York: Harry N. Abrams Publishers, 1985. ISBN 0-8109-2307-6 Translation of Les enfants d'Izieu (1985)
- French Children of the Holocaust: A Memorial. New York: New York University Press, 1996. ISBN 0-8147-2662-3 Translation of Le mémorial des enfants juifs déportés de France (1995)
