= Heinz Röthke =

German SS officer and Holocaust perpetrator

- Born: 19 January 1912; Murów, German Empire
- Died: 14 July 1966 (aged 54); Wolfsburg, West Germany
- Conviction: War crimes (in absentia)
- Penalty: Death (in absentia)
- SS service
- Allegiance: Nazi Germany
- Branch: Schutzstaffel
- Rank: SS-Obersturmführer

Heinz Röthke (19 January 1912 – 14 July 1966) was a German SS-Obersturmführer of Nazi Germany and a convicted war criminal. Röthke was the Gestapo Jewish expert in Paris, and, as such, was in overall charge of the concentration camp in Occupied France as well as of the deportation of Jews, between 1940 and 1944, during the Holocaust.

== Biography ==
Röthke first studied theology then Law, graduating with a doctorate of law from the University of Berlin. During the German occupation of France, he initially served as a Kriegsverwaltungsrat (military administration counselor) in Brest, before becoming deputy of Theodor Dannecker, the principal architect of the Jewish Question, in spring 1942. He took over from Dannecker as chief of the Department for “Jewish Affairs” on 2 July of the same year. Under his supervision, Jewish women, children, and elderly started to be sent to camps in addition to men. Röthke served in this role until August 1944. His assistants were Ernst Heinrichsohn and Horst Ahnert. On 6 March, he wrote in a memorandum:

The transport of the Jews from France must not be allowed to stop before the last Jew has left French soil, and that must happen before the end of the war.

In 1945, Röthke was found guilty of war crimes by a French tribunal and sentenced to death in absentia. He escaped to West Germany, where he resumed his career as a lawyer and lived undisturbed in Wolfsburg. In October 1961, he received a monthly pension from the Free State of Bavaria. Röthke died a natural death in July 1966 in Wolfsburg.

== Bibliography ==
- Bartrop, P.R.; Grimm, E.E. (2019). Perpetrating the Holocaust: Leaders, Enablers, and Collaborators. ABC-CLIO. ISBN 978-1-4408-5897-0.* Ernst Klee: Das Personenlexikon zum Dritten Reich. Fischer, Frankfurt am Main 2007. ISBN 978-3-596-16048-8.
- Bernhard Brunner: Der Frankreich-Komplex: die nationalsozialistischen Verbrechen in Frankreich und die Justiz der Bundesrepublik Deutschland, Wallstein Verlag, Göttingen 2004, ISBN 9783892446934
- Israel Gutman (Hrsg.): Enzyklopädie des Holocaust - Die Verfolgung und Ermordung der europäischen Juden, Piper Verlag, München/Zürich 1998, 3 Bände, ISBN 3-492-22700-7
- Klarsfeld, B.; Klarsfeld, S.; Taylor, S. (2018). Hunting the Truth: Memoirs of Beate and Serge Klarsfeld. Farrar, Straus and Giroux. ISBN 978-0-374-71470-3.
- Longerich, P. (2010). Holocaust: The Nazi Persecution and Murder of the Jews. OUP Oxford. ISBN 978-0-19-153946-6.
- Megargee, G.P.; White, J. (2018). The United States Holocaust Memorial Museum Encyclopedia of Camps and Ghettos, 1933–1945, Volume III: Camps and Ghettos under European Regimes Aligned with Nazi Germany. Indiana University Press. ISBN 978-0-253-02386-5.
- Ahlrich Meyer: Täter im Verhör. Die „Endlösung der Judenfrage“ in Frankreich 1940–1944, WBG, Darmstadt 2005, ISBN 3-534-17564-6.
