= Eichenbühl =

- Municipality
- Coat of arms

- Location of Eichenbühl within Miltenberg district
- Interactive map of Eichenbühl
- Location within Germany Location within Bavaria
- Coordinates: 49°42′N 9°20′E
- Country: Germany
- State: Bavaria
- Admin. region: Unterfranken
- District: Miltenberg
- Subdivisions: 6 Ortsteile

Government
  - Mayor (2020–26): Günther Winkler (CSU)

Area
  - Total: 31.23 km^{2} (12.06 sq mi)
- Elevation: 158 m (518 ft)

Population (2025-12-31)
  - Total: 2,464
  - Density: 78.90/km^{2} (204.3/sq mi)
- Time zone: UTC+01:00 (CET)
  - Summer (DST): UTC+02:00 (CEST)
- Postal codes: 63928, 97896 (Ebenheiderhof)
- Dialling codes: 09371
- Vehicle registration: MIL
- Website: www.eichenbuehl.de

Eichenbühl (German pronunciation: [ˈaɪçn̩byːl]) is a municipality in the Miltenberg district in the Regierungsbezirk of Lower Franconia (Unterfranken) in Bavaria, Germany.

== Geography ==
=== Location ===
Eichenbühl lies in the Bavarian Lower Main (Bayerischer Untermain) Region.

=== Constituent communities ===
Eichenbühl’s Ortsteile are Eichenbühl, Guggenberg, Heppdiel, Pfohlbach, Riedern and Windischbuchen.

== History ==
From the outlying centre of Riedern came the like-named noble family of Riedern whose armorial bearing was a red pot, which is still a charge in the community’s coat of arms today. The community in the Archbishopric of Mainz was awarded in the 1803 Reichsdeputationshauptschluss to the Principality of Leiningen, then mediatized by Baden, and in 1810 ceded to the Grand Duchy of Hesse-Darmstadt. In the Hesse-Bavaria Rezeß in Frankfurt in 1816, it finally passed to Bavaria. In the course of administrative reform in Bavaria, the current community came into being with the Gemeindeedikt (“Municipal Edict”) of 1818.

=== Population development ===
Within town limits, 2,553 inhabitants were counted in 1970, 2,680 in 1987, in 2000 2,809 and in 2013 2,572.

== Politics ==
=== Community council ===
The mayor is Günther Winkler (CSU).

The council is made up of 14 council members, with the seats apportioned thus:

- CSU 9 seats
- SPD/Unabhängige Wählergemeinschaft 5 seats

=== Coat of arms ===
The community’s arms might be described thus: Per saltire in chief gules a wheel spoked of six argent, dexter argent a pot of the first with two spouts, sinister a flag, the pole of the first per bend sinister, the flag square of the first to sinister of the pole, thereon a cross bottonnée of the field, in base gules issuant from the base point palewise an oak sprig leafed of two and acorned of three of the second.

The six-spoked Wheel of Mainz and the tinctures argent and gules (silver and red) refer to Electoral Mainz’s former overlordship. The red pot is taken from the arms formerly borne by the Lords of Riedern, who were first mentioned in 1206, and who died out in 1588. The flag stands for Heppdiel, the cross thereon being Saint Maurice’s cross, referring to Saint Maurice’s Parish Church in Heppdiel. The oak sprig is canting for the name Eichenbühl (Eiche means “oak” in German), and was drawn from Eichenbühl’s old arms, discarded in 1959.

The arms have been borne since 1995.

== Sport ==
Yearly, the AvD/GAMSC International Lower Franconia Hillclimb is held. Each year, the hillclimb enjoys greater enthusiasm. The course is 3.05 km long and leads along Staatsstraße (State Road) 507 from Eichenbühl to Umpfenbach.

== Economy and infrastructure ==
According to official statistics, there were 254 workers on the social welfare contribution rolls working in trade and transport in 1998. In other areas, 76 workers on the social welfare contribution rolls were employed, and 1,009 such workers worked from home. There were 0 processing businesses. Seven businesses were in construction, and furthermore, in 1999, there were 32 agricultural operations with a working area of 1 076 ha, of which 716 ha was cropland and 351 ha was meadowland.

=== Education ===
In 1999 the following institutions existed in Eichenbühl:

- Kindergartens: 75 places with 107 children
- Primary schools: 1 with 18 teachers and 309 pupils
