= Bürgstadt =

- Municipality
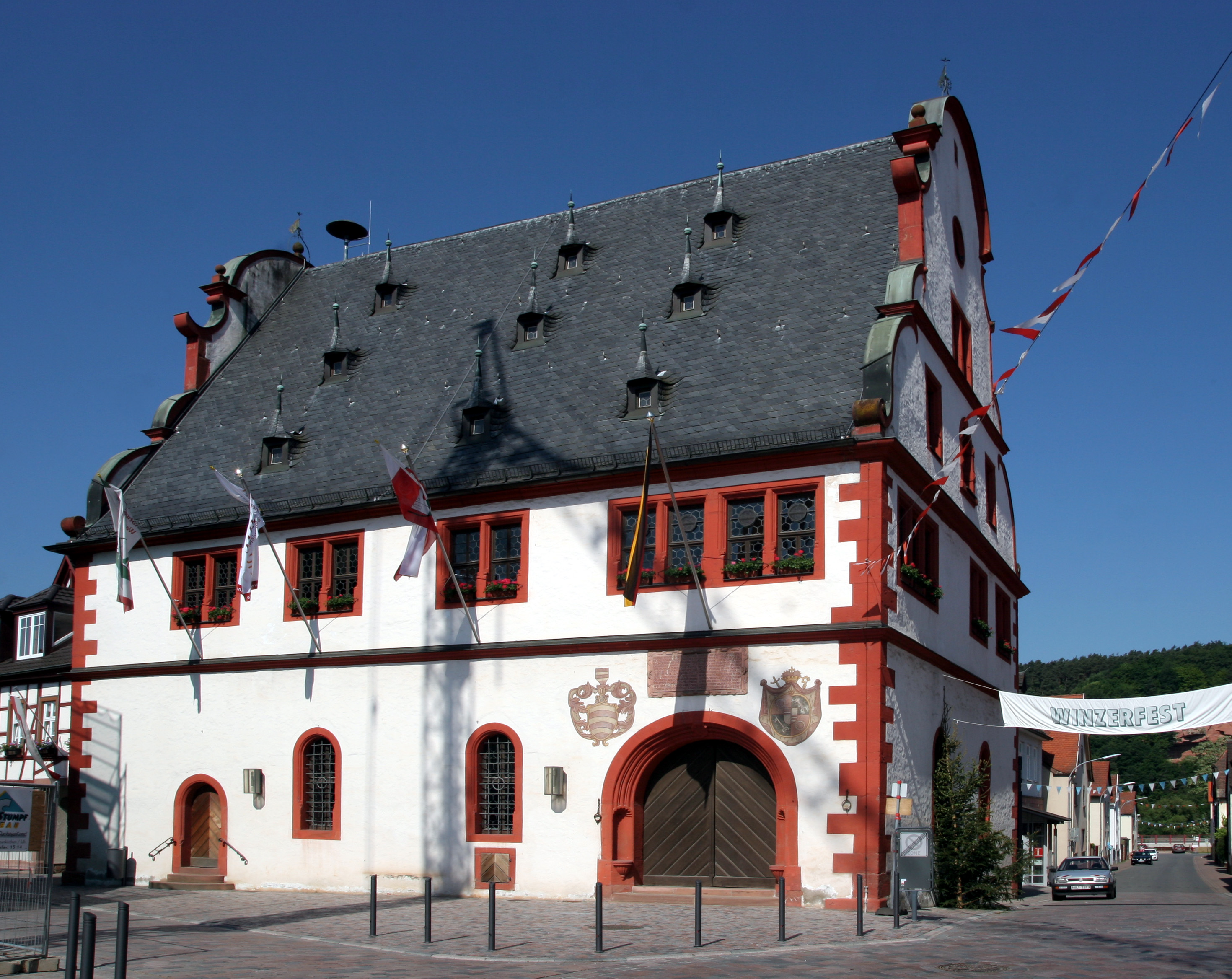
- Renaissance town hall

- Coat of arms

- Location of Bürgstadt within Miltenberg district
- Interactive map of Bürgstadt
- Location within Germany Location within Bavaria
- Coordinates: 49°42′49″N 09°16′17″E
- Country: Germany
- State: Bavaria
- Admin. region: Lower Franconia
- District: Miltenberg
- Municipal assoc.: Erftal

Government
  - Mayor (2026–32): Klaus Helmstetter (KHB)

Area
  - Total: 17.38 km^{2} (6.71 sq mi)
- Elevation: 150 m (490 ft)

Population (2025-12-31)
  - Total: 4,148
  - Density: 238.7/km^{2} (618.1/sq mi)
- Time zone: UTC+01:00 (CET)
  - Summer (DST): UTC+02:00 (CEST)
- Postal codes: 63927
- Dialling codes: 09371
- Vehicle registration: MIL
- Website: www.buergstadt.de

Bürgstadt (German pronunciation: [ˈbʏʁkʃtat]) is a market municipality in the Miltenberg district in the Regierungsbezirk of Lower Franconia (Unterfranken) in Bavaria, Germany and the seat of the Verwaltungsgemeinschaft (Administrative Community) of Erftal. Bürgstadt is a winegrowing community in the wine region of Franken. It has a population of around 4,300.

== Geography ==
=== Location ===
Bürgstadt lies at the mouth of the river Erf where it empties into the Main and has grown together with the district seat of Miltenberg lying to the southwest. It lies at the northeast edge of the Odenwald hill, on the boundary with Baden-Württemberg.

== History ==
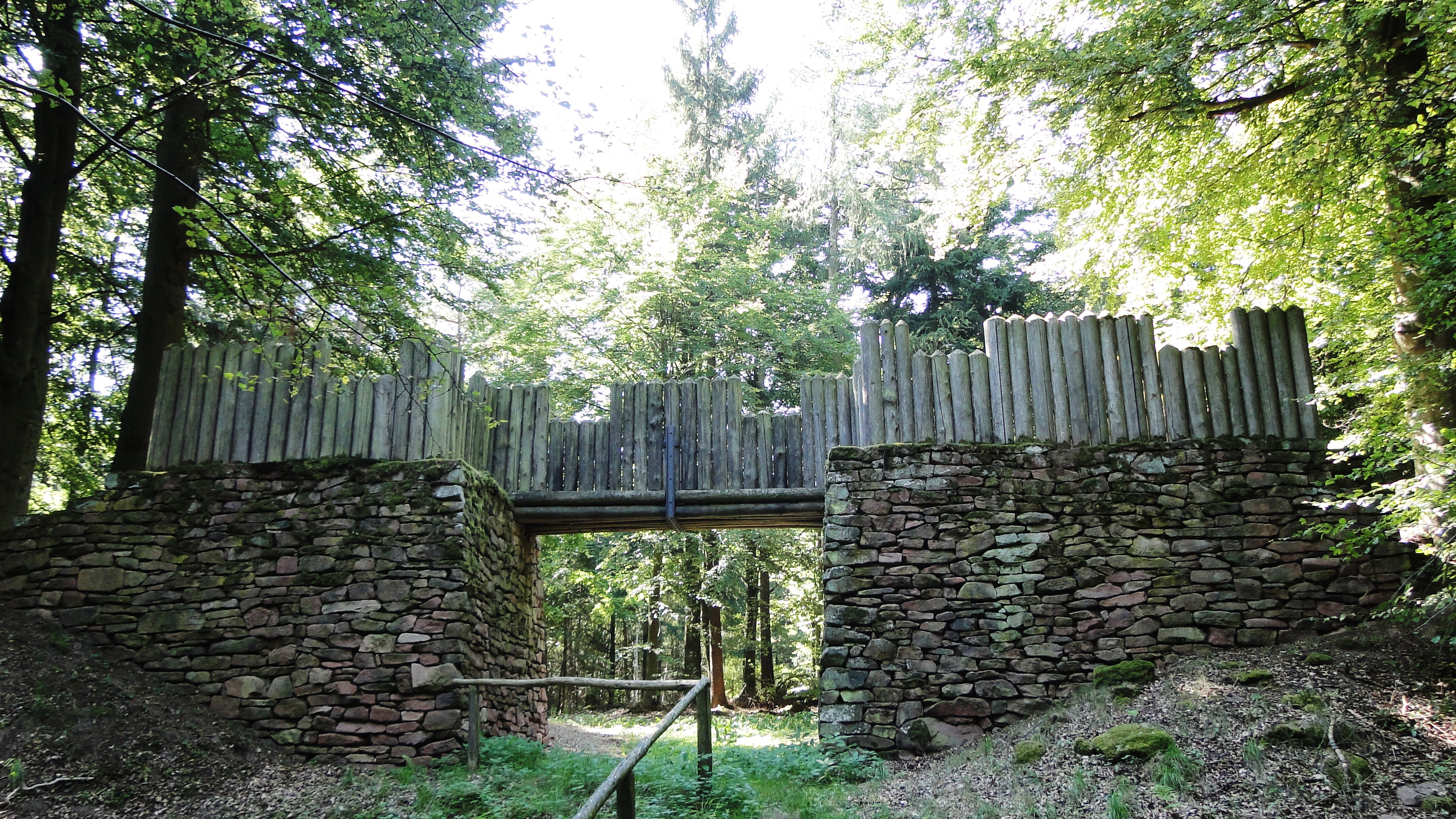
Ringwall Bürgstadter Berg. Reconstructed gate of the Urnfield-period fortification

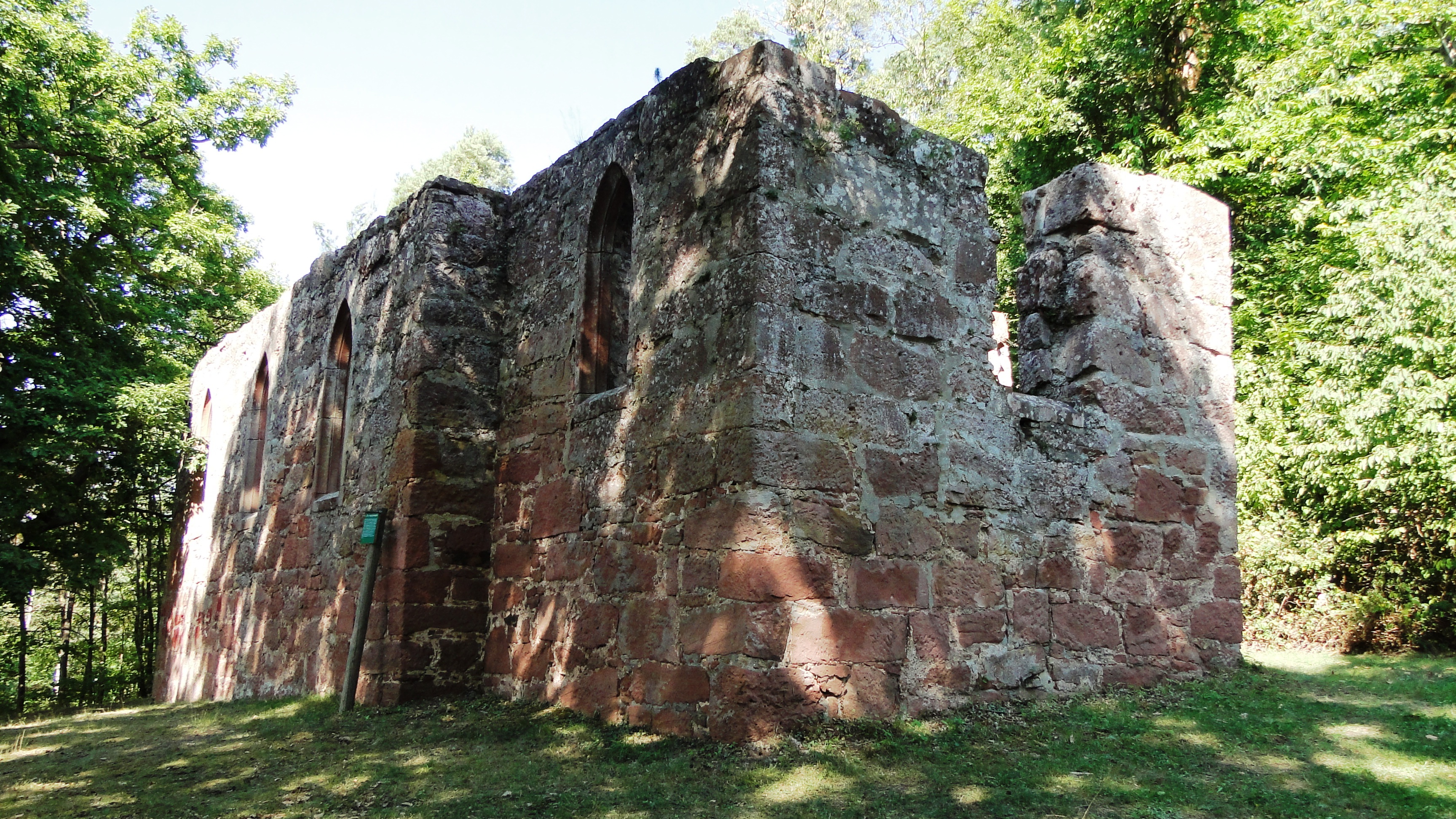
Ruin of the 17th-century Centgrafenkapelle

The Bürgstadter Berg (hill) (see Ringwall Bürgstadter Berg) was inhabited as early as 3,200 BC by members of the Michelsberg culture. During the Urnfield period (ca. 1200 to 800 BC) a fortified settlement protected by a circular rampart was constructed on the hill. The ramparts stretched for a total length of 3.2 km, surrounding an area of ca. 40 hectares. Excavations found remains of a gate from around 900 BC.

In 1181, Bürgstadt had its first documentary mention. Bürgstadt passed into Electoral Mainz's control early on.

== Economy ==
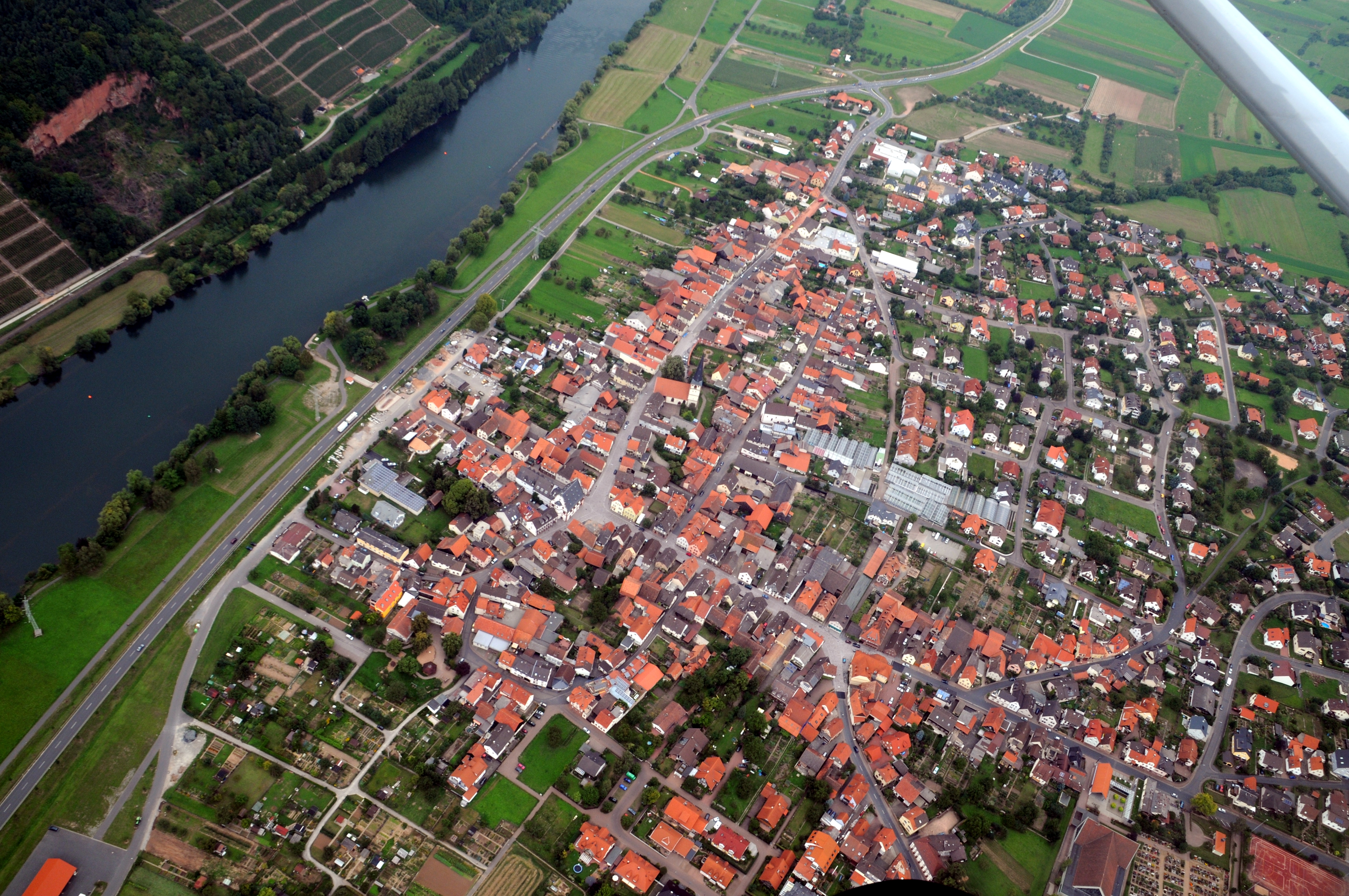
Aerial view of Bürgstadt (2008)

In the past furniture making, the growing of tobacco and (for centuries) quarrying all played a role in the local economy.

Winegrowing was first mentioned in a document in 1248. With just under 60 ha of vineyards, it is one of the biggest winegrowing communities on the Lower Main.

== Notable buildings ==
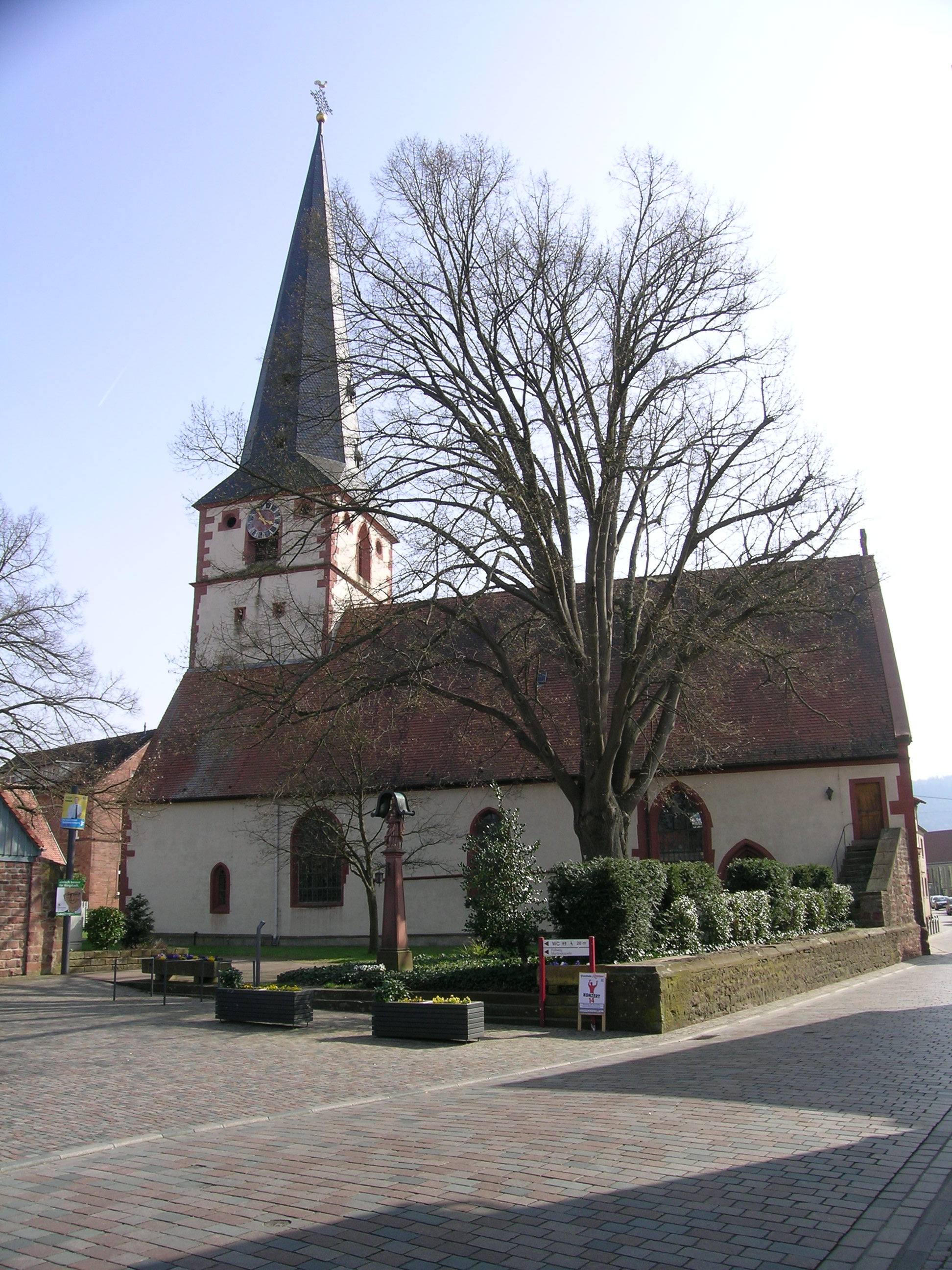
Old parish church

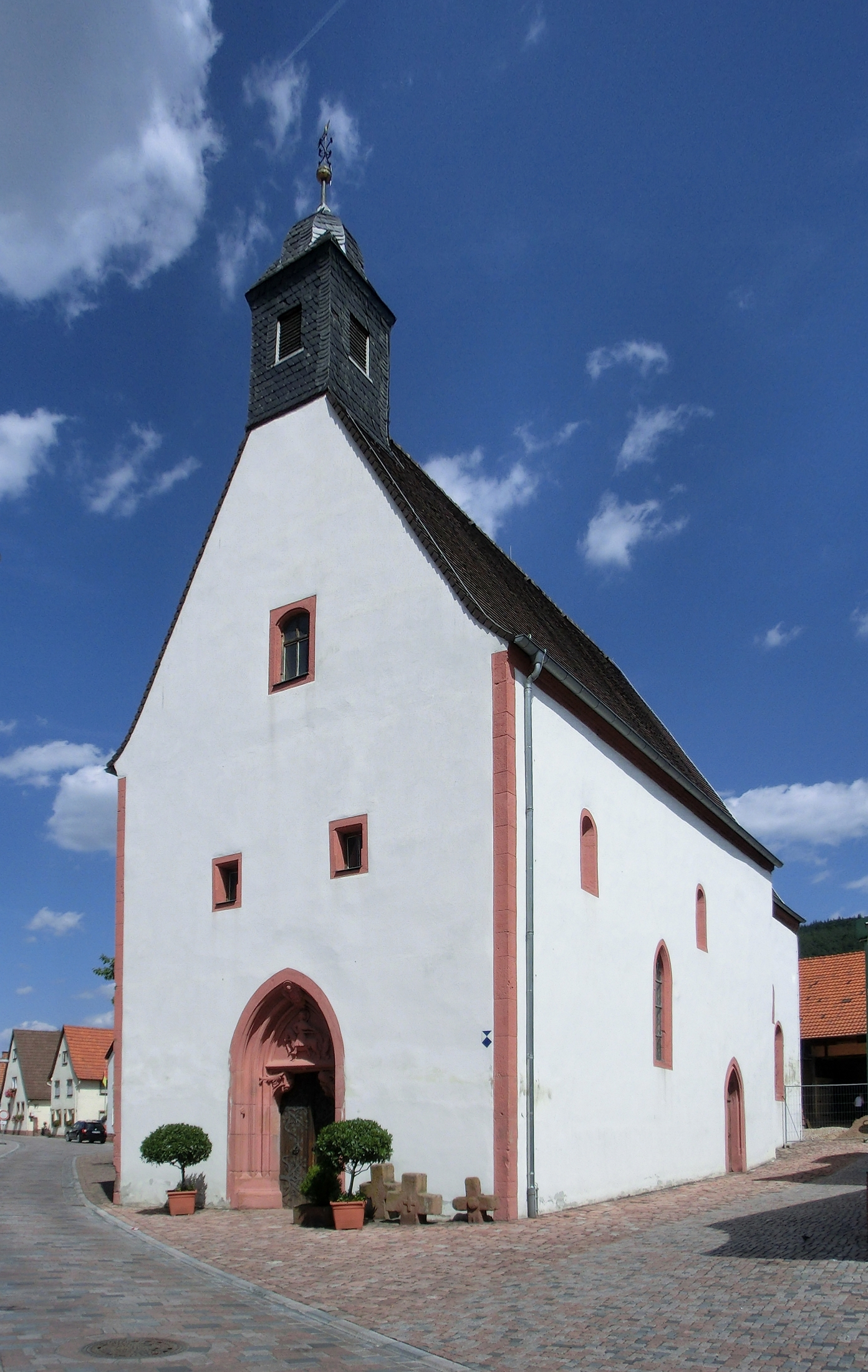
Martinskapelle

The Martinskapelle is a chapel originally erected about 950 and rebuilt on the earlier foundations ca. 1200, with its mural Bible paintings presented in 40 medallions (ca. 1590). It also features Gothic doors (ca. 1490) and a Baroque altar (ca. 1600). The late Romanesque old parish church (built about 1350) was until 1522 the mother church of Miltenberg. There are also the historic town hall (built about 1590-2) and the ruins of the Centgrafenkapelle ("Tithe Counts’ Chapel") from the 17th century on a nearby hill. Work on the latter ceased during the Thirty Years' War leaving the unfinished building a ruin. The modern Catholic parish church dates from 1961.

== Government ==
=== Community council ===
The council is made up of 17 council members, counting the mayor.

1 KHB	7 CSU	2 SPD/GRÜNE/ÖDP	7 UWG	17 Total

(as at municipal election held on 8 March 2026)

=== Coat of arms ===
The community’s arms might be described thus: On a base vert gules a castle embattled argent with two round side towers likewise embattled and with door and windows open, in chief between the towers is the Wheel of Mainz.

Despite the market community’s The arms have been borne since the 19th century.

== Notable people ==
- Ernst Heinrichsohn, mayor from 1978 to 1980, sentenced in 1980 in Cologne to six years in prison for having taken part in persecuting Jews in occupied France during the Second World War (see: Vel' d'Hiv Roundup)
- Johann Michael Breunig (Baroque composer)
- Maria Bachmann (actress, screenwriter, producer)
