= Miltenberg =

- Town
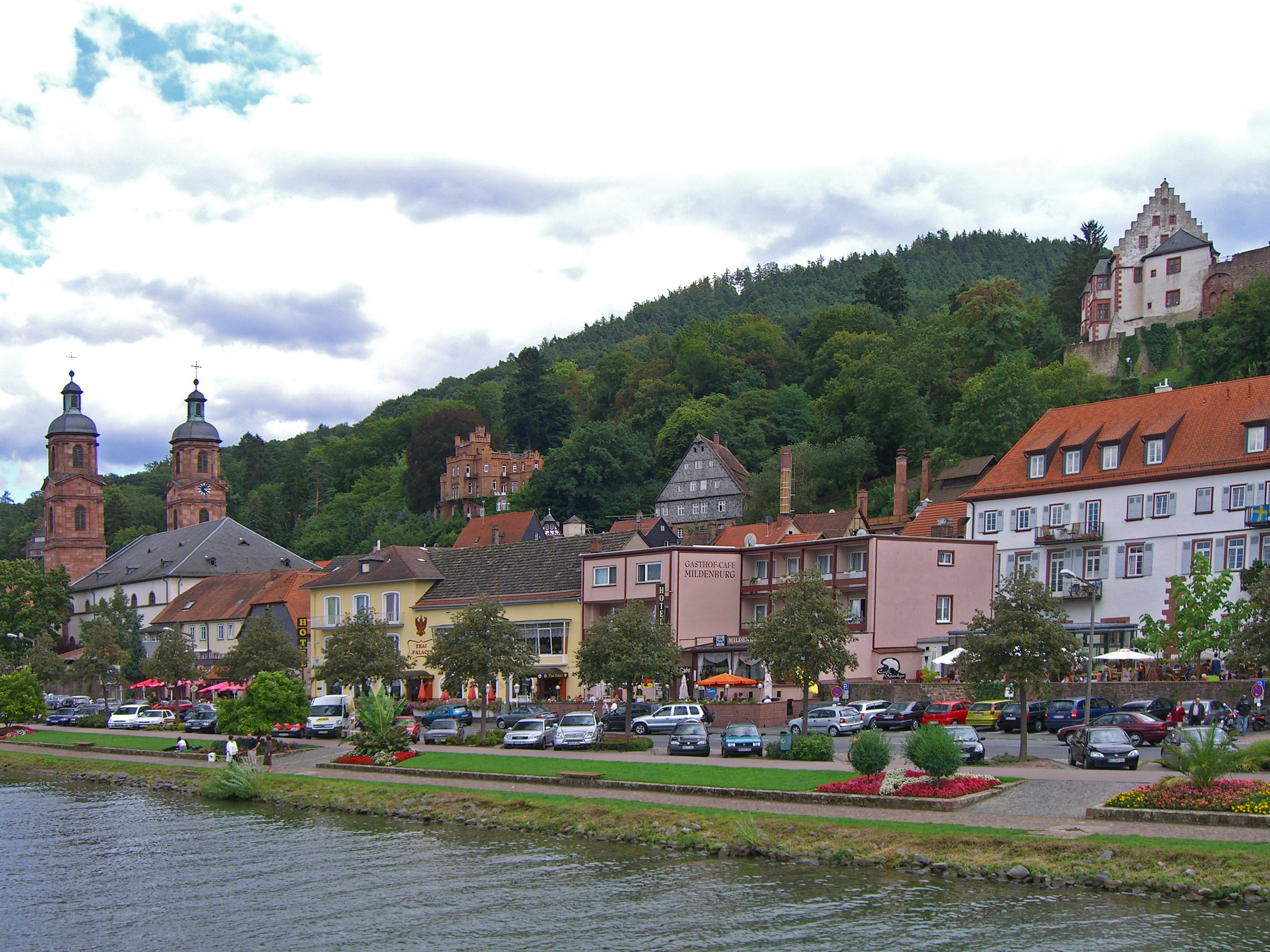
- View of Miltenberg over the Main river

- Coat of arms

- Location of Miltenberg within Miltenberg district
- Interactive map of Miltenberg
- Location within Germany Location within Bavaria
- Coordinates: 49°42′14″N 09°15′52″E
- Country: Germany
- State: Bavaria
- Admin. region: Unterfranken
- District: Miltenberg
- Subdivisions: 8 Stadtteile

Government
  - Mayor (2020–26): Bernd Kahlert (CSU)

Area
  - Total: 60.25 km^{2} (23.26 sq mi)
- Elevation: 129 m (423 ft)

Population (2025-12-31)
  - Total: 9,283
  - Density: 154.1/km^{2} (399.1/sq mi)
- Time zone: UTC+01:00 (CET)
  - Summer (DST): UTC+02:00 (CEST)
- Postal codes: 63897
- Dialling codes: 09371
- Vehicle registration: MIL
- Website: www.stadt-miltenberg.de

Miltenberg (German: [ˈmɪltn̩ˌbɛʁk]) is a town in the Regierungsbezirk of Lower Franconia (Unterfranken) in Bavaria, Germany. It is the seat of the eponymous district and has a population of over 9,000.

== Geography ==
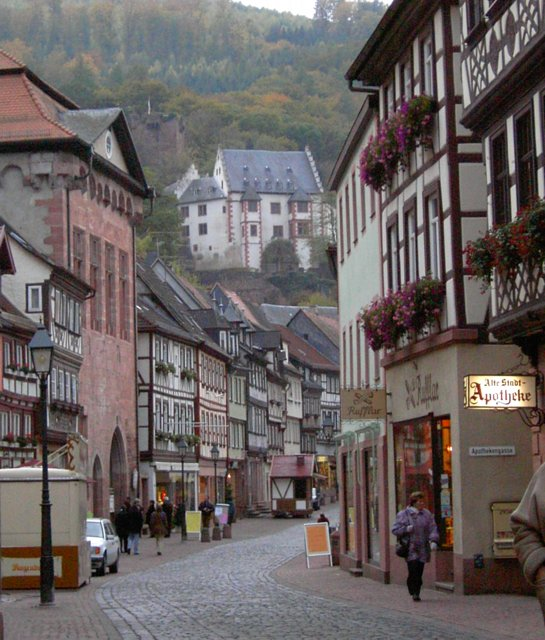
Historic old town and Mildenburg

=== Location ===
The old town lies on the Main’s left bank on the "left knee" of the Mainviereck ("Main Square") between the Spessart and Odenwald ranges. Since the Main riverbed in the Miltenberg area is relatively near the foot of the Odenwald, only a narrow strip of usable land is left, little over 150 meters in width, which in past centuries was time and again flooded by the Main. The historic centre, which stands on this land, often sustained considerable damage in these floods. Only in the 21st century efficient flood control measures, most of all a wall, have significantly reduced the adverse effects of these floods. Since about the beginning of the 20th century, after buying land from the neighbouring community of Großheubach, Miltenberg has been expanding on the right bank.

== History ==
=== Pre-history and Antiquity ===
In pre-Roman times, circular ramparts were built on the Greinberg above Miltenberg and on the Bürgstadter Berg (also known as Wannenberg) northeast of Bürgstadt. These were in use as early as the Neolithic (Michelsberg culture) but mostly date from the late Bronze Age (Urnfield culture).

In the 150s, the Roman Empire pushed outwards its fortified border in Germania, establishing the Upper Germanic-Rhaetian Limes which replaced the Odenwald-Neckar-Limes. From Miltenberg on northwards, the river Main became the border. East of Miltenberg a fortified palisade stretched to the south and east towards Walldürn and on to Lorch.

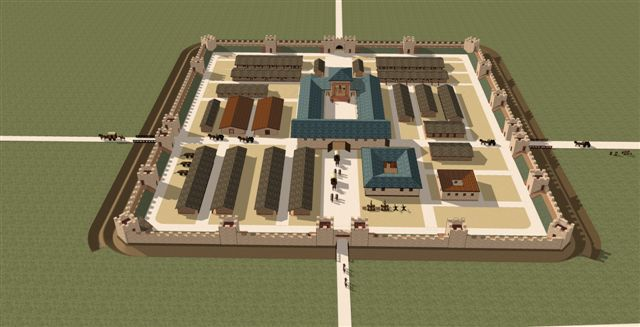
Computer reconstruction of the Roman Altstadtkastell

Two castra were established: the Altstadtkastell between Miltenberg and Kleinheubach (2.7 hectares) to the north and the Kastell Miltenberg-Ost in the direction of Bürgstadt (0.6 hectares). The former, which was likely built some years in advance of the overall change in the borderline, housed a cohort, the southernmost military presence on the Main. In 190/1, this was the cohort I Sequanorum et Rauricorum equitata (a mixed infantry and cavalry unit of 480 men). In addition, a scout unit (exploratores Triputienses) was based in the area, either in the Altstadtkastell or in a nearby separate fort. The cohort castrum likely was continuously occupied until about 260, when the Romans abandoned this part of their border after heavy raids by Germanic tribes. The castrum was destroyed by the Alemanni.

The Limes itself met the Main near the eastern castrum, Miltenberg-Ost which housed a Numerus, a smaller military unit. The exact line the wall followed for the first few kilometers near the Main is not known. This smaller fort was likely built in the 2nd century, probably soon after 150. It was in use at most until the middle of the 3rd century.

During their presence, the Romans also built at least two sanctuaries dedicated to Mercury on the Greinberg.

=== Middle Ages ===
After the withdrawal of the Romans from the area, the regional population declined. Burgundians and Alemanni moved through the lower Main region, but it was only under the Franks (after 500 AD) that the population density again rose noticeably. Their settlements often did not simply grow out of the formerly Roman cores but included separate newly established sites.

Early Medieval settlers concentrated on the area south of the former Altstadtkastell, northwest of the current town. A Carolingean church was likely built there (9th century) and stones from the castrum were used in early Medieval fortifications nearby. In the 10th to 12th century a town wall was added to this castle-like structure, largely following the foundations of the castrum. A flooded moat surrounded the wall. A Romanesque church was built inside the walled area. This settlement likely was the civitas Walehusen, owned by the Count Palatinate in his role as Vogt of Lorsch Abbey. This was destroyed in 1247 by troops of the Archbishop of Mainz, Siegfried III.

At this point, the population of Walehausen/Wallhausen was likely moved to the village Miltinburc, previously founded by Mainz during the first quarter of the 13th century and mentioned first in 1226. Another village, Vachhausen, in between Miltinburc and Wallhausen, was abandoned in the Middle Ages, but the Gothic Laurentiuskapelle, located far from the Medieval center of Miltenberg, was built on the remains of the earlier Romanesque parish church of Vachhausen.

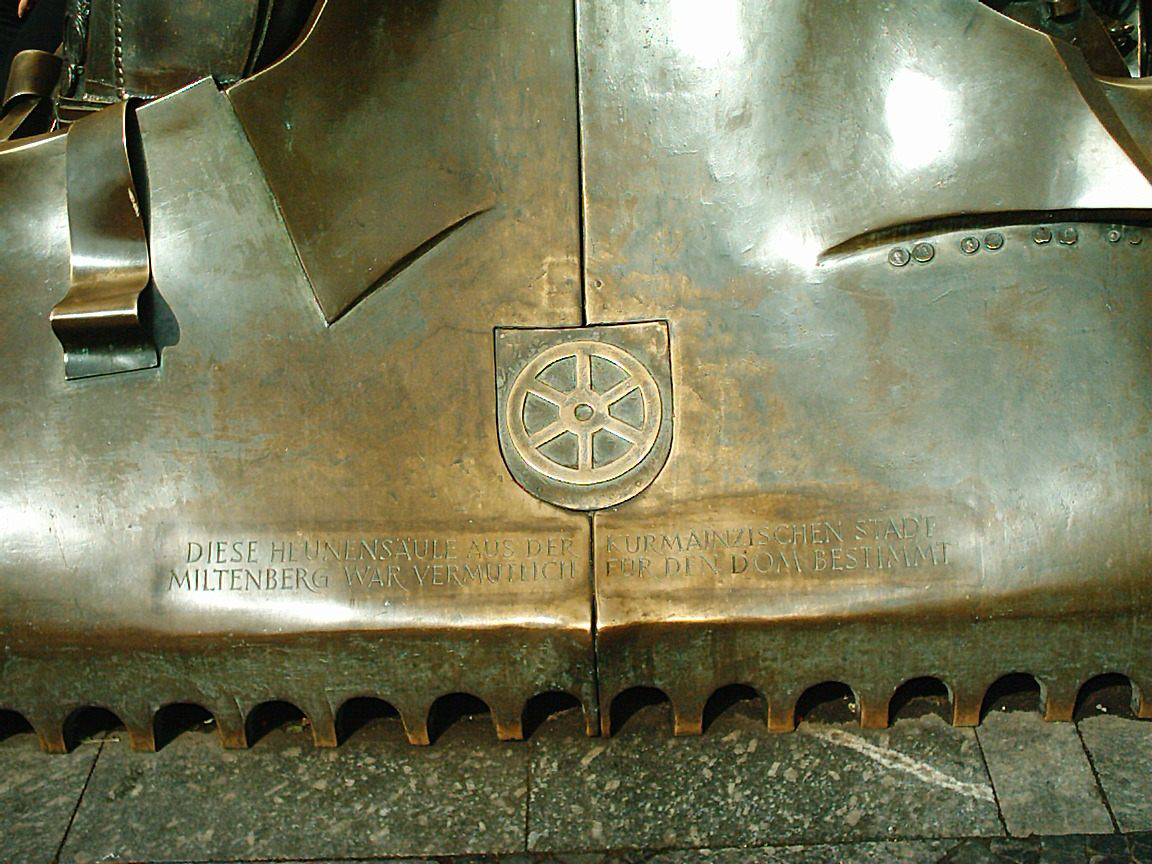
Inscription on the Heunensäule

Already by the early Middle Ages, the area's red buntsandstein was highly sought-after, with products such as grindstones and columns being hewn in the surrounding woods. The so-called Heunensäulen were made near Miltenberg. They are special bunter columns likely intended for Mainz Cathedral when it was built around the year 1000. The master builder, however, apparently decided that they were not needed, so they never became part of the cathedral. One of the monoliths now stands in Mainz’ cathedral square, a gift to the city on the occasion of the cathedral's 1,000th anniversary in 1975. Other columns are at Munich (Bayerisches Nationalmuseum) and Nuremberg (Germanisches Nationalmuseum).

Miltenberg/Miltinburc grew around a Mainz toll station built on the river bank in the 13th century, protected by the Mildenburg (castle). The castle itself dates from the 12th century. In 1237, the village was awarded the status of town. It profited from the Stapelrecht which forced passing merchants to store their wares locally and offer them for sale for some days. This boosted construction of inns and warehouses. For protection, walls from the castle were extended around the town. This oldest part of the town was just 100 meters east to west, extending west from today's Schnatterloch. The first expansion of the settlement stretched east to the Mittelturm and west to the Schwertfegerturm (both later demolished). By the 14th century, the town had expanded to the limits which roughly endured until the 19th century: from Würzburger Tor (east) to Spitzenturm/Mainzer Tor (west).

During its financial heyday, Miltenberg also saw considerable construction activity: of the many secular and non-Christian Gothic structures today only the winery, a warehouse and the former synagogue remain. Gothic churches included the Stadtkirche (St Jakobus) but it mostly lost its original exterior character when it was rebuilt in the 1830s. The nearby Wallfahrtskapelle Maria ad gradus (built circa 1400) was demolished in 1825. Close to the Spital zum heiligen Petrus, a hospital dedicated to St. Peter and founded circa 1310 by Peter of Aspelt, Archbishop of Mainz, the Spitalkirche was constructed (demolished 1846).

Its strategic position on the bend of the navigable river and on the important trade route Nuremberg-Frankfurt made Miltenberg a politically influential member of the nine town league (Neun-Städte-Bund) of Mainz. This state of affairs lasted until the German Peasants' War in 1525, when the local representative, Friedrich Weygand, sided with the peasants and was executed. He had also favoured the Reformation and after 1522, when Miltenberg finally became independent of the Bürgstadt parish, had helped Johann Draconites, a supporter of Martin Luther, to head the new parish.

=== Modern ===
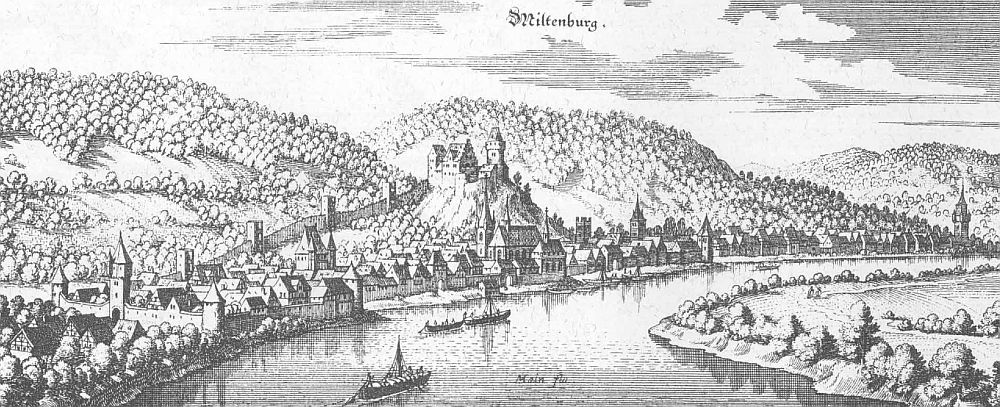
Miltenberg – excerpt from the Topographia Hassiae by Matthäus Merian the Younger, 1655

From 1667 the Franziskanerkirche was built by de:Antonio Petrini. Most of the half-timbered houses dominating the appearance of the old town today date from the 15th to 18th centuries. The inn Zum Riesen, originally a Gothic house from circa 1400 was replaced in 1590 by the current building.

Until 1803, Miltenberg belonged to Electoral Mainz. After securalization and the Reichsdeputationshauptschluss, Miltenberg passed to the Principality of Leiningen, with which it was incorporated into the Grand Duchy of Baden in 1806. After having become part of the Grand Duchy of Hesse-Darmstadt in 1810, the town finally became part of the Kingdom of Bavaria in 1816.

In 1912 and 1951, Miltenberg acquired lands on the Main’s right bank to expand the town.

In 2006, the town made national headlines when parish priest Ulrich Boom rang the bells for 20 minutes during a rally of the far-right National Democratic Party of Germany, thereby disrupting the event. Ulrich Boom later became Auxiliary Bishop.

=== Amalgamations ===
The following villages were amalgamated into Miltenberg:

- 1 January 1971: Breitendiel
- 1 January 1976: Mainbullau
- 1 January 1976: Schippach (with Berndiel)
- 1 January 1976: Wenschdorf (with Monbrunn)

== Economy ==
Tourism is very important for the economy of Miltenberg. Visitors are mainly day trippers from the urban agglomerations in Hesse (Hanau, Offenbach am Main, Darmstadt, Frankfurt), but bunter sandstone, some small and medium enterprises and crafts and trade are also important.

== Governance ==
=== Mayors ===
- 1870-1905: Jakob Josef Schirmer
- 1906-1924: Franz Breitenbach
- 1925-1930: Roland Schmid
- 1930-1933: Wilhelm Schwesinger
- 1933-1935: Josef Funk
- 1935-1945: Anton Burkart
- 1945-1951: Oskar Sermersheim
- 1952-1966: Anton Blatz
- 1966-1978: Ludwig Büttner
- 1978-1990: Anton Vogel
- 1990-2014: Joachim Bieber
- 2014-2020: Helmut Demel
- since 2020: Bernd Kahlert

=== Town council ===
The council is made up of 20 council members with seats apportioned thus:

- CSU: 5 seats
- Liberale Miltenberger: 4 seats
- SPD: 3 seats
- B.90/Die Grünen: 2 seats
- ÖDP: 2 seats
- Miltenberger Wahlgemeinschaft e.V. MWG: 2 seats
- Bürgerliste Miltenberg: 1 seat
- FW: 1 seat

(as of the municipal election held in March 2020)

=== Town twinning ===
Miltenberg currently has two twin towns:

- Arnouville-lès-Gonesse, Val-d'Oise, France since June 1982
- Duchcov, Czech Republic since 2005

=== Sponsorship ===
In 1960, the sponsorship for the Sudeten Germans driven out of the town of Duchcov was undertaken, which eventually resulted in the town-twinning.

=== Coat of arms ===
The town’s arms might be described thus: Quartered, first and fourth squares are gules with a wheel of six spokes in argent, second and third squares are argent with the letter M in gules.

Miltenberg belonged from its founding in the 13th century until the Old Empire’s downfall in 1803 to Electoral Mainz which is the origin of the Wheel of Mainz. The M first appeared in a seal from the early 16th century that also included Saint Martin, as had earlier seals. The current arms are based on those that were once seen on the now vanished Schindtor, a town gate.

== Arts and culture ==
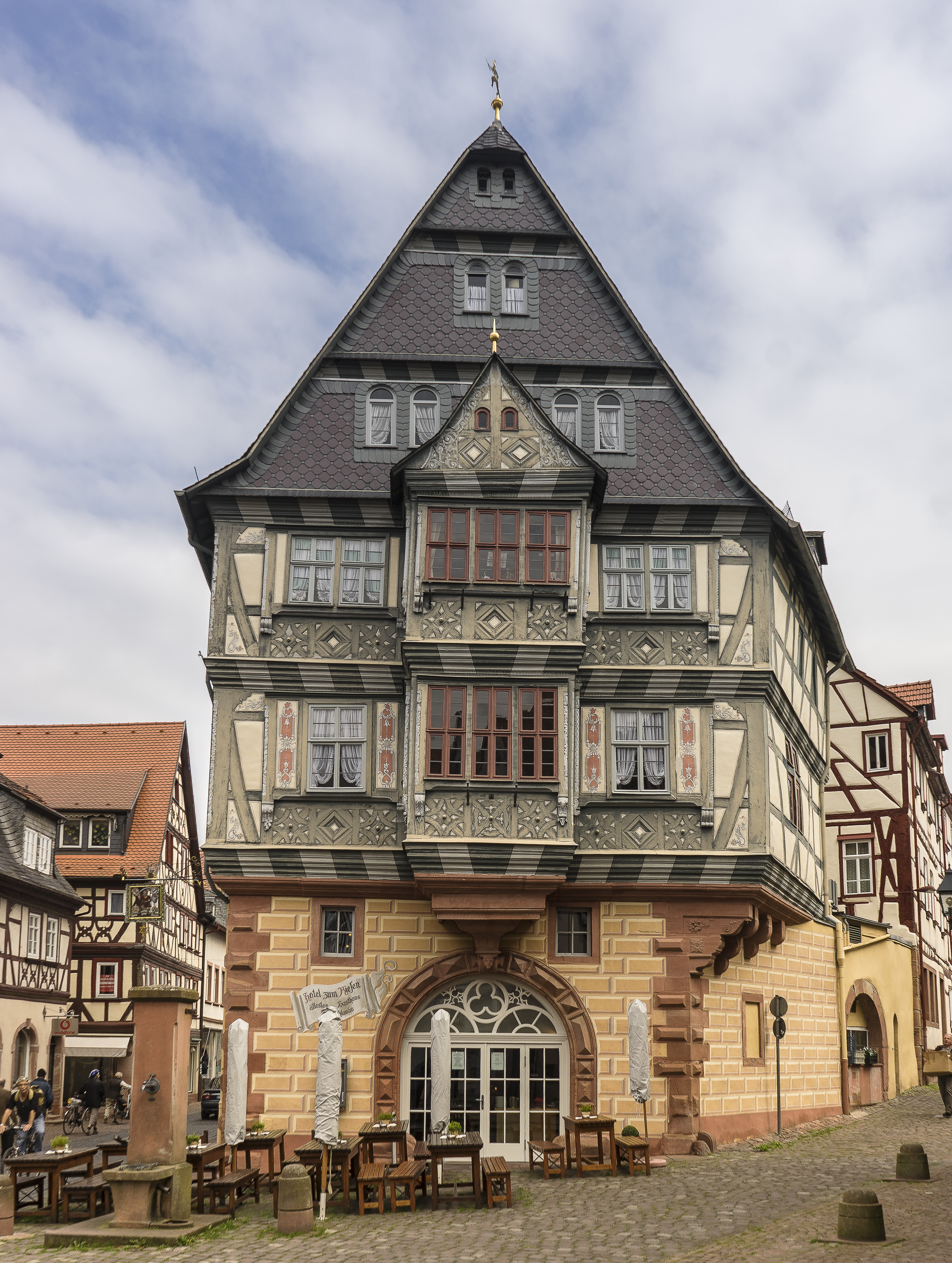
Hotel Zum Riesen

=== Main sights ===
- Historic town centre with the Schnatterloch, the historic market square which served as a location for some scenes of the film The Spessart Inn (1958). Nearby are the Hotel Zum Riesen (one of Germany’s oldest inns, if not the oldest) and the old town hall. Miltenberg still has a total of around 150 half-timbered houses.
- Mildenburg (the local castle). It was the seat of the Oberamtmann, the Archbishop's local administrator until 1803. It then passed to the Princes of Leiningen before Carl Gottlieb Horstig purchased it in 1825. His widow sold it to Friedrich Gustav Habel, who also preserved several other castles on the Rhine and Mosel rivers. He set up a museum of his collection of antiquities in the Mildenburg. His nephew Wilhelm Conrady researched the Limes and discovered the Teutonenstein (see below). Conrady's heirs auctioned off castle and collections. His nephew, August Conrady bought the Marstall (stables) and exhibited his art collection there. The castle has been under the town’s ownership since 1979. In 2010/2011, it was renovated. It now houses a museum of icons and contemporary art (Museum.Burg.Miltenberg). The castle’s inner ward once held the Teutonenstein, a 5 m-tall sandstone column found on Greinberg, the inscription of which is still a puzzle to this day.
- Town museum "Museum.Stadt.Miltenberg", which now contains the Teutonenstein
- Mainz Gate (Mainzer Tor)
- Würzburg Gate (Würzburger Tor)
- The Gothic Laurentiuskapelle ("Saint Lawrence’s chapel") with its abutting graveyard.

=== Tourism ===
Miltenberg lies on the Fränkischer Rotwein Wanderweg ("Franconian Red Wine Hiking Trail"), which was established in 1990, and leads from Großwallstadt through Miltenberg to Bürgstadt.

A new concept was introduced with the Route der Industriekultur Rhein-Main (“Rhine-Main Industrial Culture Route”), which covers the 160 km between Miltenberg and Bingen. Industrial buildings in this area provide the visitors with the opportunity to learn about the industrial heritage in a regional context 700 buildings have already been scientifically catalogued, including Miltenberg’s old railway station.

=== Gallery ===
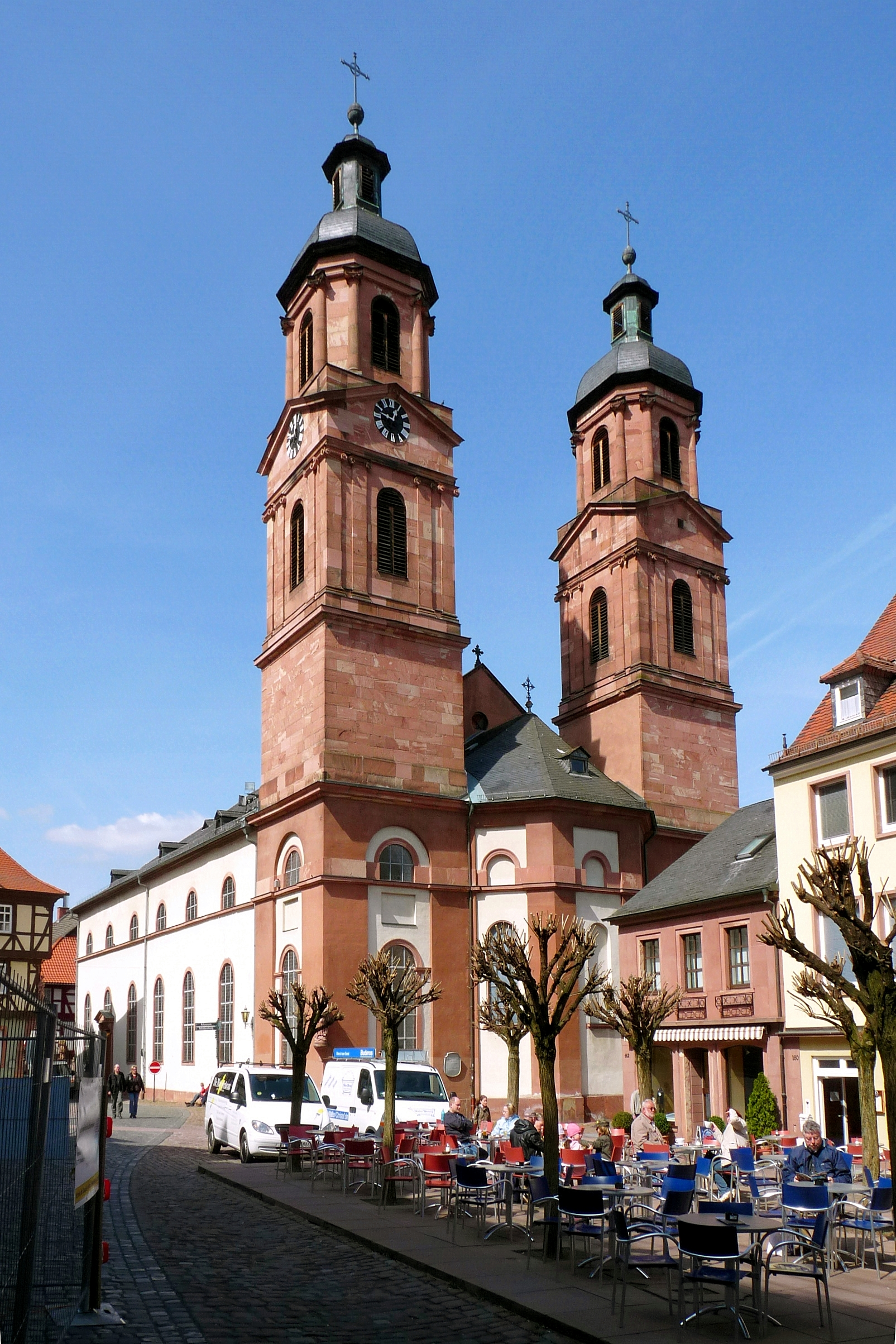
Stadtkirche/Church St. Jakobus

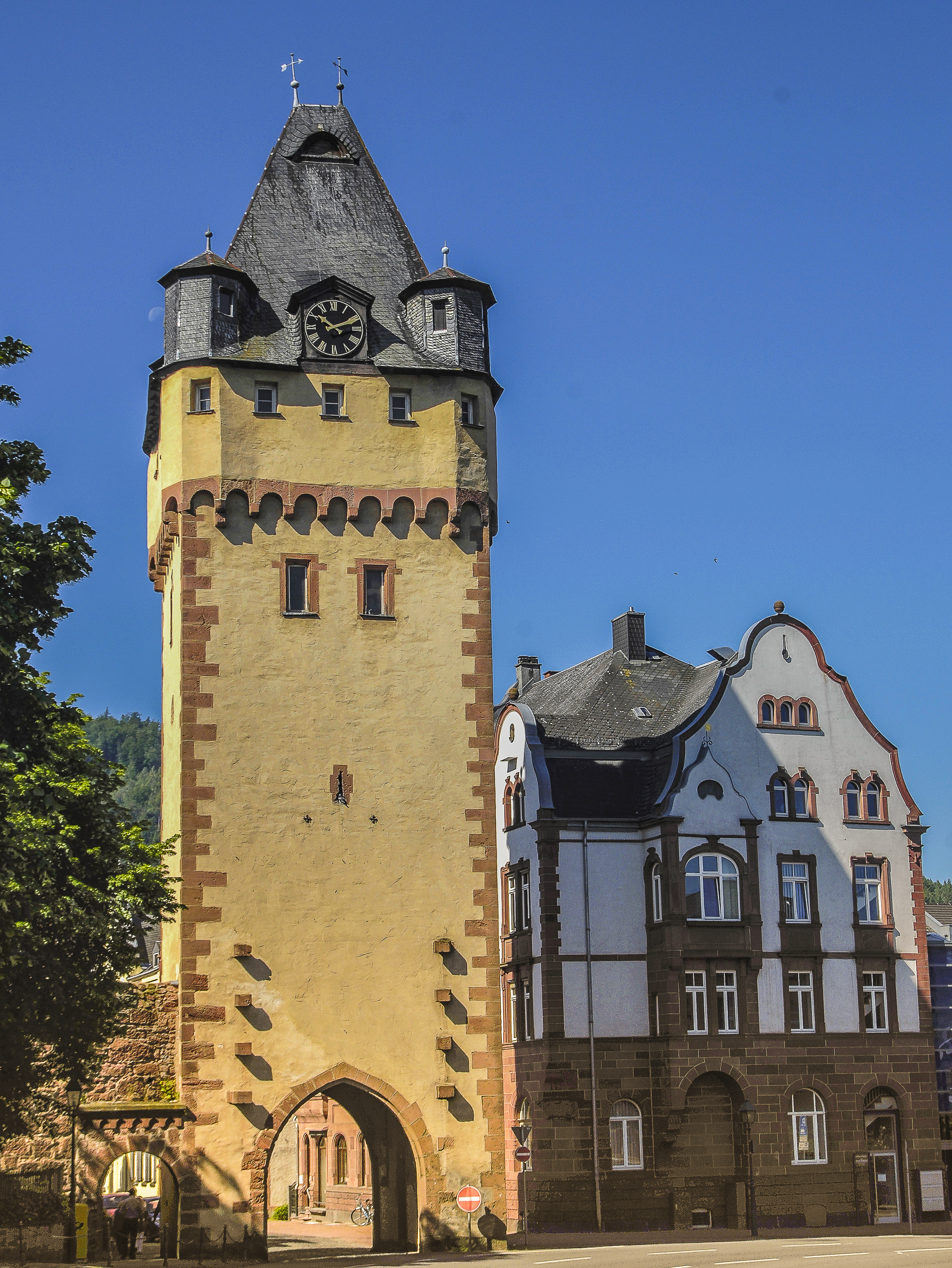
The Würzburg Gate east of the town center

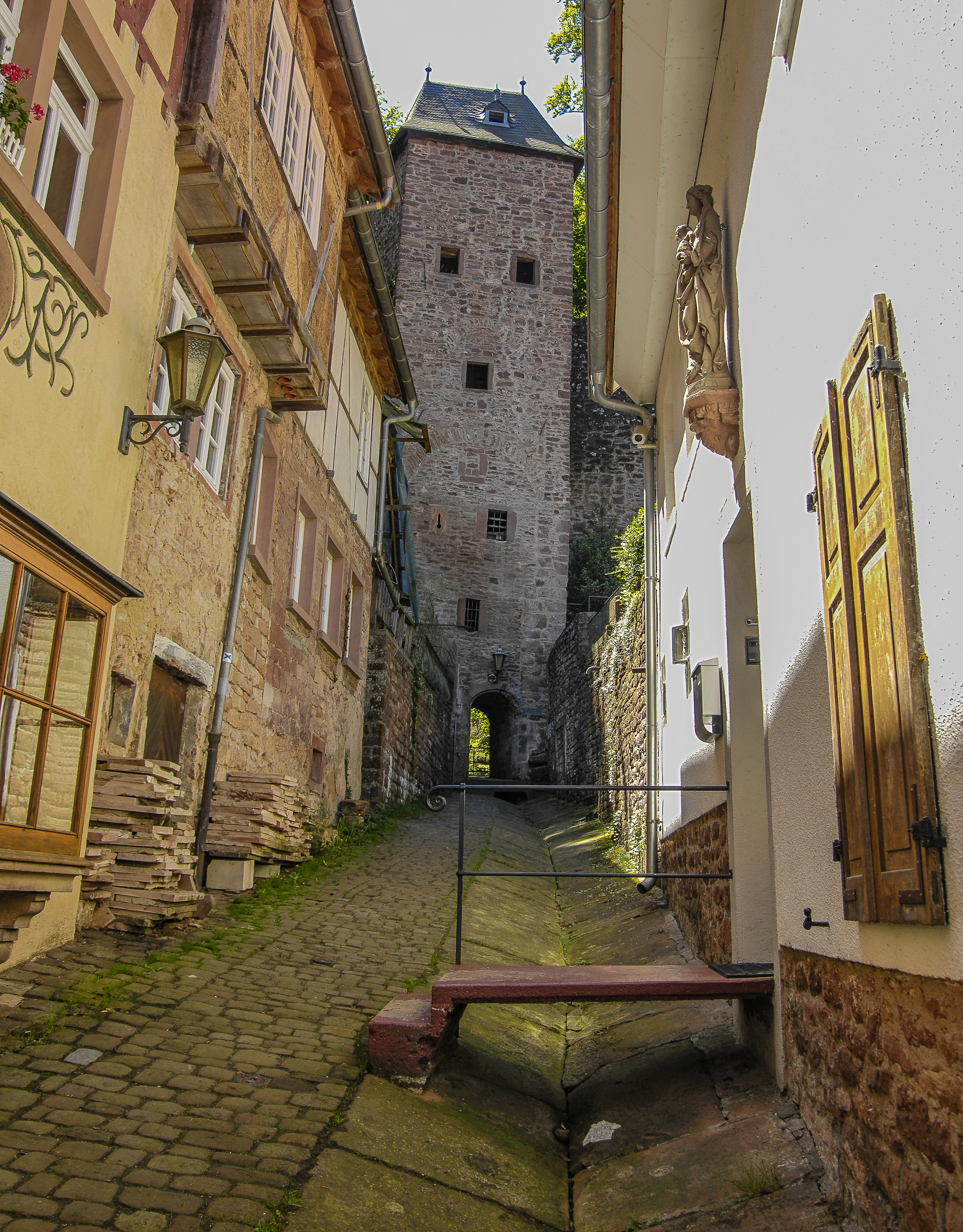
Schnatterlochtor

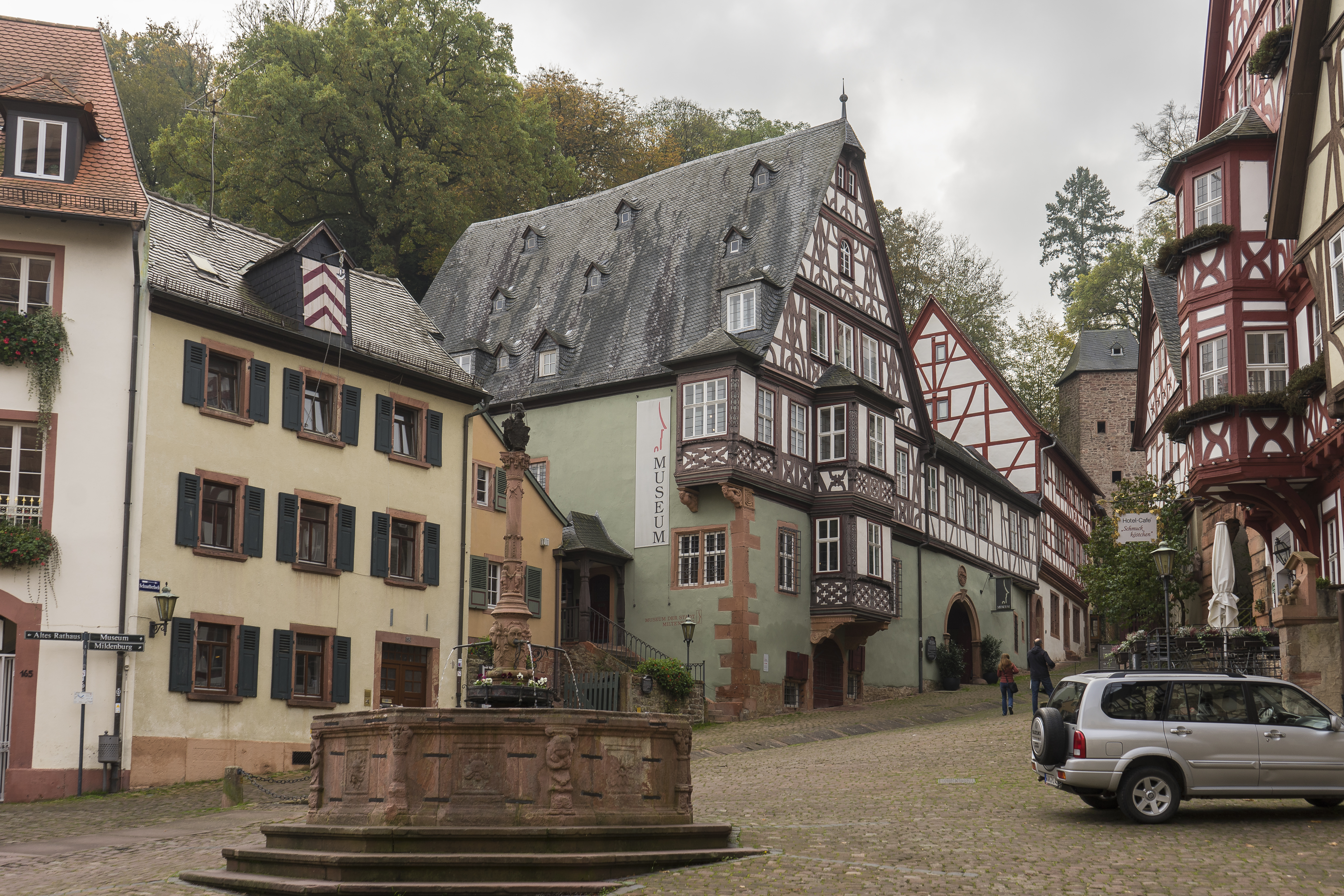
Market square Miltenberg

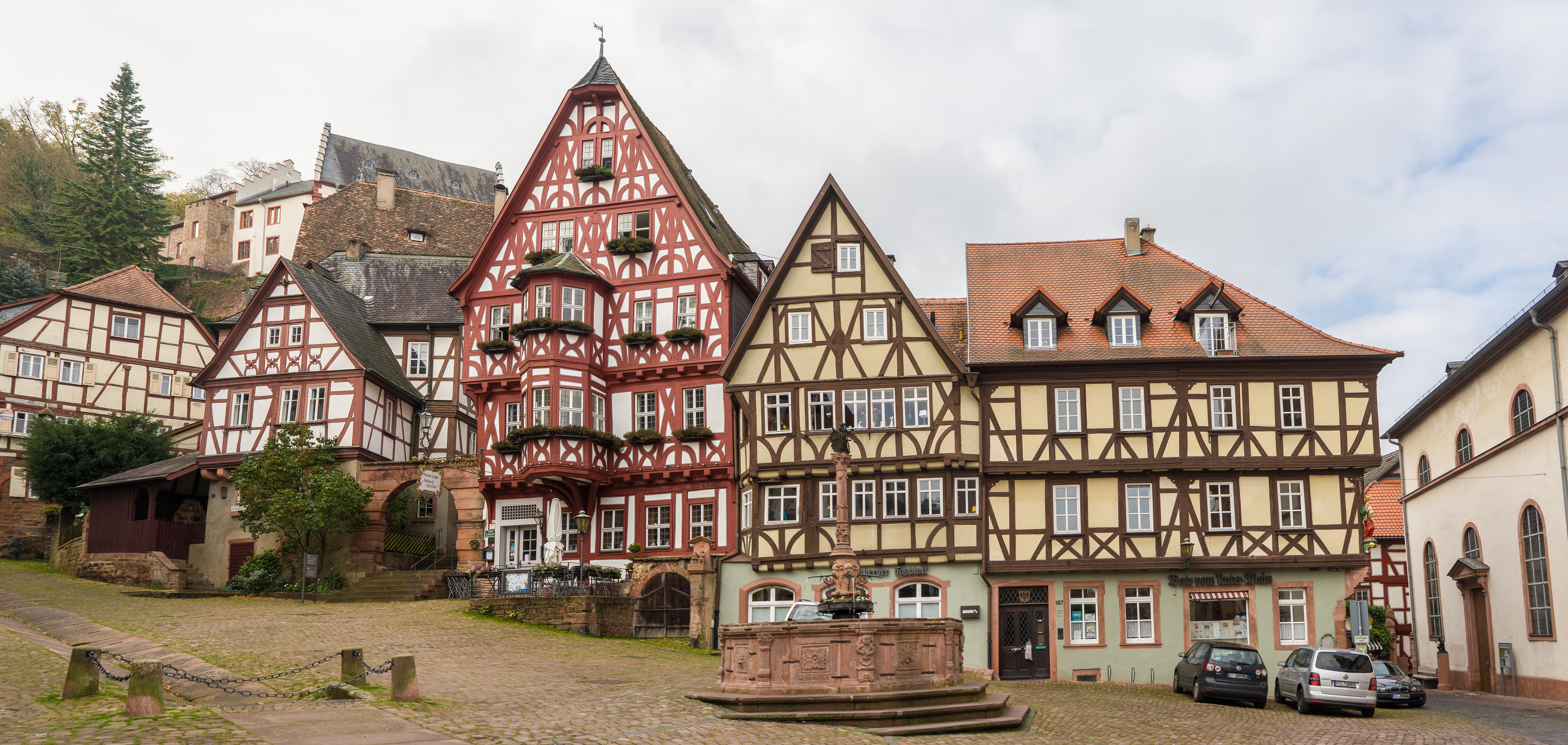
Market square Miltenberg

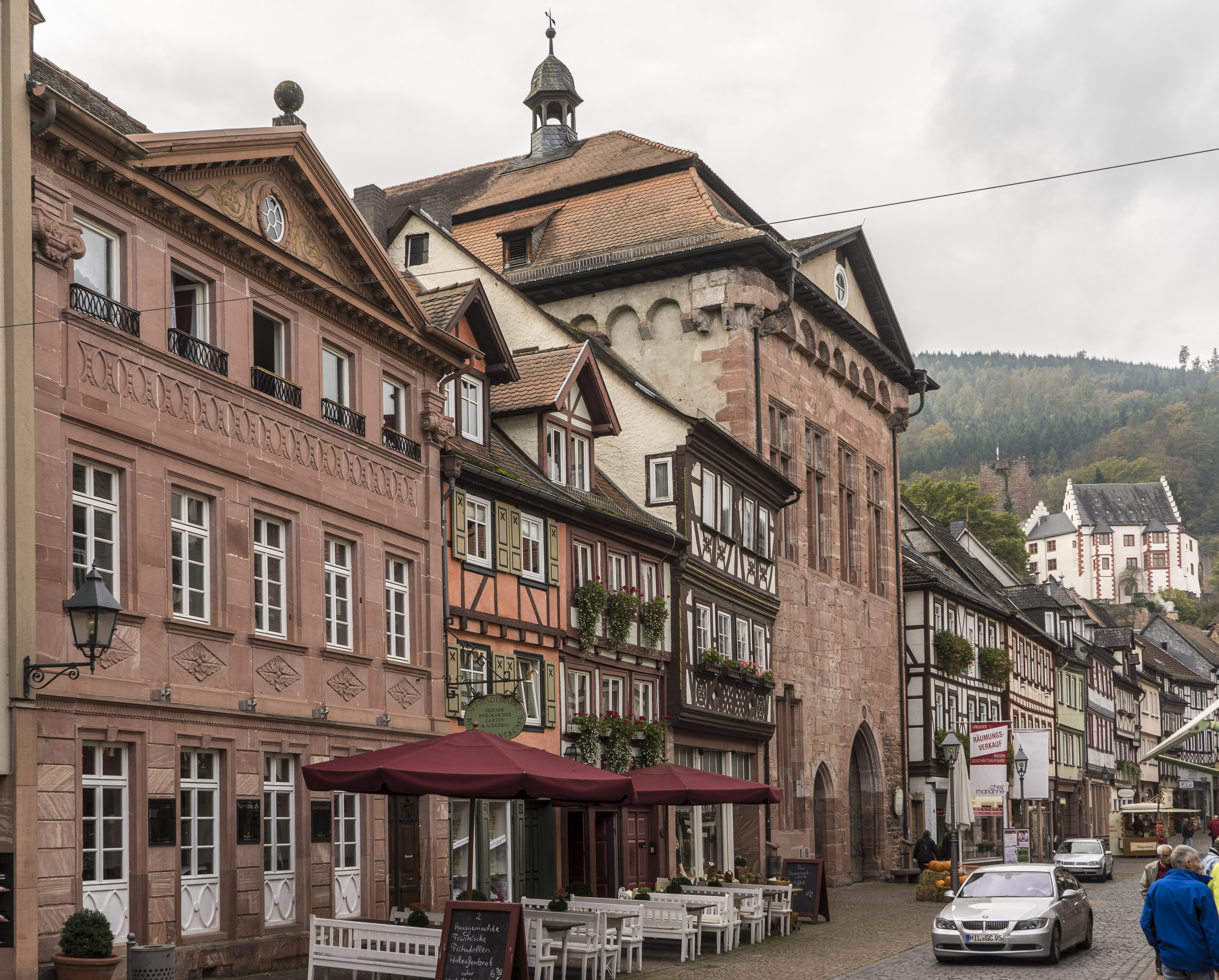
Main street Miltenberg

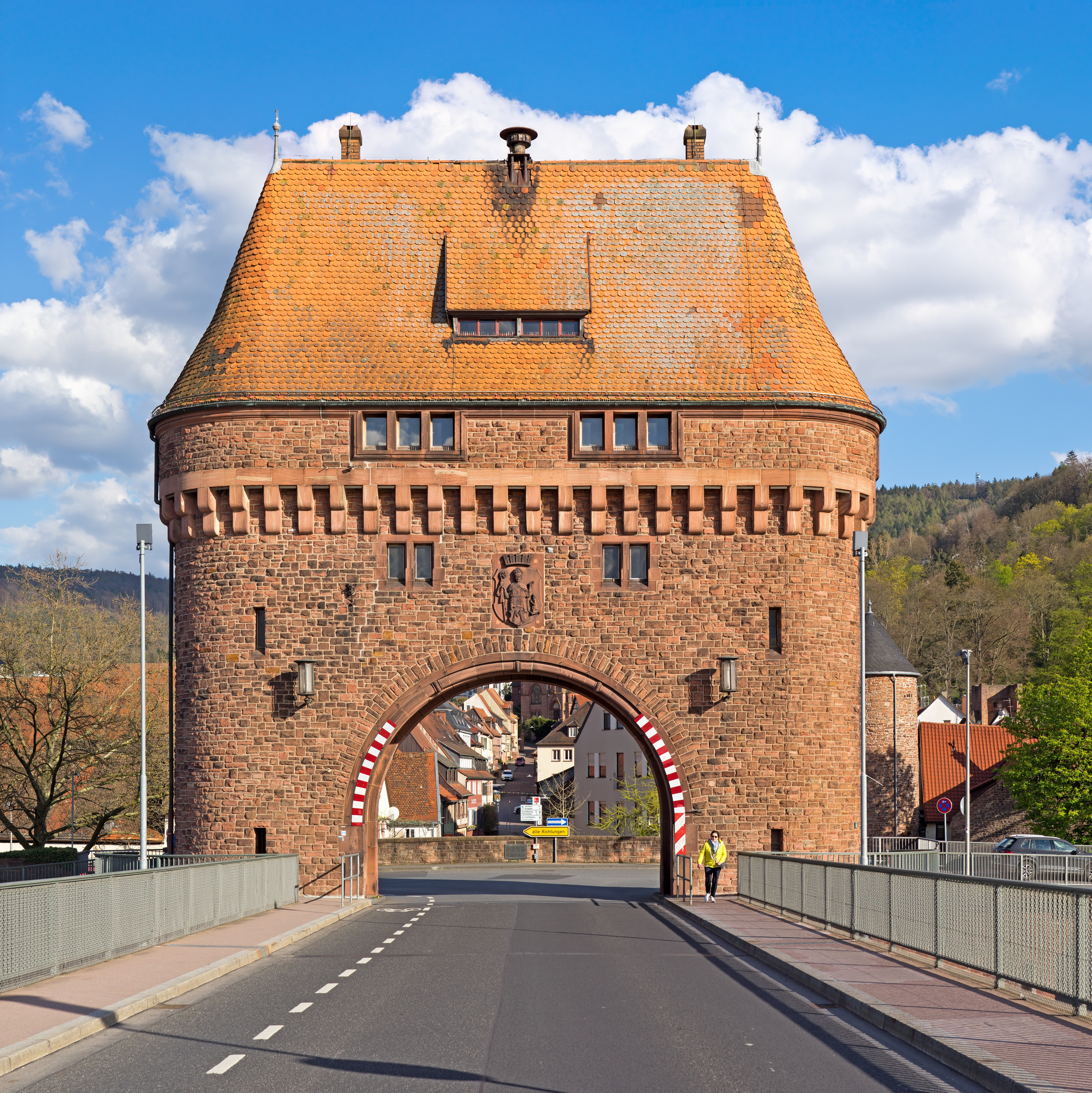
Gatehouse on the bridge over the Main river

=== Regular events ===
- On the first weekend in July, the Town Festival (Stadtfest) is held.
- In late July, the Mildenburger Theatertage (“Theatre Days”) take place.
- Beginning on the last weekend in August and for ten days, the Michaelismesse ("St Michael's Fair"), the biggest fair on the Bavarian Lower Main (Bayerischer Untermain), is held (despite the similarity in names, it is not Michaelmas, which falls on 29 September, a month later).

== Infrastructure ==
=== Transport ===
Miltenberg lies on the railway line from Aschaffenburg to Wertheim (Main Valley Railway). Moreover, the Madonnenlandbahn branches off here towards Seckach. There are hourly connections to Aschaffenburg by day. In 1977, Deutsche Bundesbahn closed the terminus station right near the town (Miltenberg Hauptbahnhof) and replaced it with Bahnhof Miltenberg, a through station on the other side of the river.

Miltenberg is linked to the urban agglomerations in Hesse, where many inhabitants work. In 2008, the town bypass, which had been discussed and planned for more than 25 years was completed. The construction costs, a sum of €55,000,000, were for the first time ever in Bavaria financed by a public-private partnership scheme.

== Education ==
In Miltenberg various kinds of schools are represented:

- Grundschule Miltenberg (primary school)
- Heinrich-Ernst-Stötzner-Schule (special school)
- Mittelschule Miltenberg
- Johannes-Hartung-Realschule
- Johannes-Butzbach-Gymnasium
- Berufsschule Miltenberg-Obernburg (vocational school)

== Notable people ==
=== Honorary citizens ===
- Wolf Klingenstein (b. 24 May 1833; d. 27 February 1916), he later changed his first name to Wilhelm or William, born in Miltenberg, tobacconist and importer of tobacco products in London, conferred 3 April 1911: Klingenstein's substantial donations enabled among others the funding of the new synagoge in Miltenberg
- Johann Jakob von Hauck (b. 22 December 1861; d. 23 January 1943), Archbishop of Bamberg, conferred 2 May 1921: His birth town recognized von Hauck’s services to the Diocese of Würzburg, in which Miltenberg lies, by making him an honorary citizen.
- Matthias Ehrenfried (b. 3 August 1871; d. 30 May 1948), Bishop of Würzburg, conferred 19 April 1927: Ehrenfried was honoured for building an episcopal boys’ seminary, “Kilianeum” in Miltenberg.

=== Sons and daughters of the town ===
- Johannes Butzbach (1477 Miltenberg–1516 Maria Laach), humanist
- Johannes Hartung (1505 Miltenberg–1579 Freiburg im Breisgau), Greek scholar and Hebraist
- Christoph Wamser (1580 presumably in Miltenberg–1649 presumably in Cologne), Baroque architect
- Joseph Martin Kraus (1756 Miltenberg–1792 Stockholm), composer
- Philipp Wirth (1808 Miltenberg–1878 Miltenberg), painter
- Carl Gerster (1813 Miltenberg–1891 Regensburg), physician and founder of the Franconian Singing Association (Fränkischer Sängerbund)
- Valentin Blatz (1825 Miltenberg–1894 Milwaukee), brewer and banker
- Prince Miguel Januário (1853 Miltenberg-1927 Seebenstein), Duke of Bragança
- Hermann Graml (b. 1928), historian and publicist
- Ernst Volland (b. 1946), artist
- Heiko Michael Hartmann (b. 1957), jurist and writer
- Björn Hertl (b. 1976), professional football player with Wacker Burghausen
- Heiko Grimm (b. 1977), handball player with HSV Hamburg

=== People linked with the town ===
- Matthias von Buchegg, Archbishop of Mainz and Imperial Archchancellor of the Holy Roman Empire, d. 9 September 1328 in Miltenberg
- Johann Draconites, also known as Johannes Drach or Trach(e), theologian and reformer, (1522 - 1523 clergyman in Miltenberg), d. 18 April 1566 in Wittenberg
- Rudolf Hirth du Frênes, painter, b. 24 July 1846 in Gräfentonna near Gotha; d. 1 May 1916 in Miltenberg
- Jakob Fischer-Rhein, painter, b. 28 January 1888 in Düsseldorf; d. 28 October 1976 in Miltenberg
- Petrus Karl Mangold, Franciscan, (1920 - 1931 minister and people’s missionary at the Miltenberg Monastery), d. 18 July 1942 at Dachau concentration camp
- Paul Briscoe, British child stranded there during the Second World War, b. 12 July 1930 in London, England; d. 12 August 2010
- Werner Beierwaltes, philosophy professor, b. 8 May 1931 in Klingenberg am Main
- Anton Schlembach, Bishop Emeritus of Speyer, b. 7 February 1932 in Großwenkheim
