= Jean Leguay =

Vichy France official and Holocaust perpetrator

- Born: 9 November 1909; Chevreuse, France
- Died: 2 July 1989 (aged 79); Paris, France
- Known for: Organisation of the Vel' d'Hiv Roundup
- Conviction: Crimes against humanity (1979)

Jean Leguay (29 November 1909 – 2 July 1989) was the second-in-command of the French National Police during the Nazi Occupation of France. He was complicit in the 1942 roundup of Jews in Paris and their deportation from France to Nazi extermination camps, which resulted in the murders of thousands of people, both adults and children.

== World War II ==
During Vichy France, Leguay was second-in-command to René Bousquet, the general secretary of the National Police in Paris. Leguay participated in organising the Vel' d'Hiv Roundup (Rafle du Vel' d'Hiv), the mass arrest of more than 13,000 Jews on 16 and 17 July 1942 in Paris. They were deported to extermination camps in Eastern Europe, where most were killed.

== Postwar ==
After the war, Leguay became president of Warner-Lambert, Inc. of London, which is now merged with Pfizer. Later, he became president of Substantia Laboratories in Paris.

In 1979, Leguay was charged with crimes against humanity for his role in the organisation of the Vel' d'Hiv Roundup, the mass arrest of more than 13,000 Jews on 16 and 17 July 1942 in Paris.

== Death ==
Leguay died of cancer in 1989, aged 79. The French judiciary officially stated after his death that Leguay's involvement in crimes against humanity had been ascertained beyond doubt.
