= Beaune-la-Rolande internment camp =

WWII internment camp in Nazi-occupied France

Beaune-la-Rolande
- Transit camp
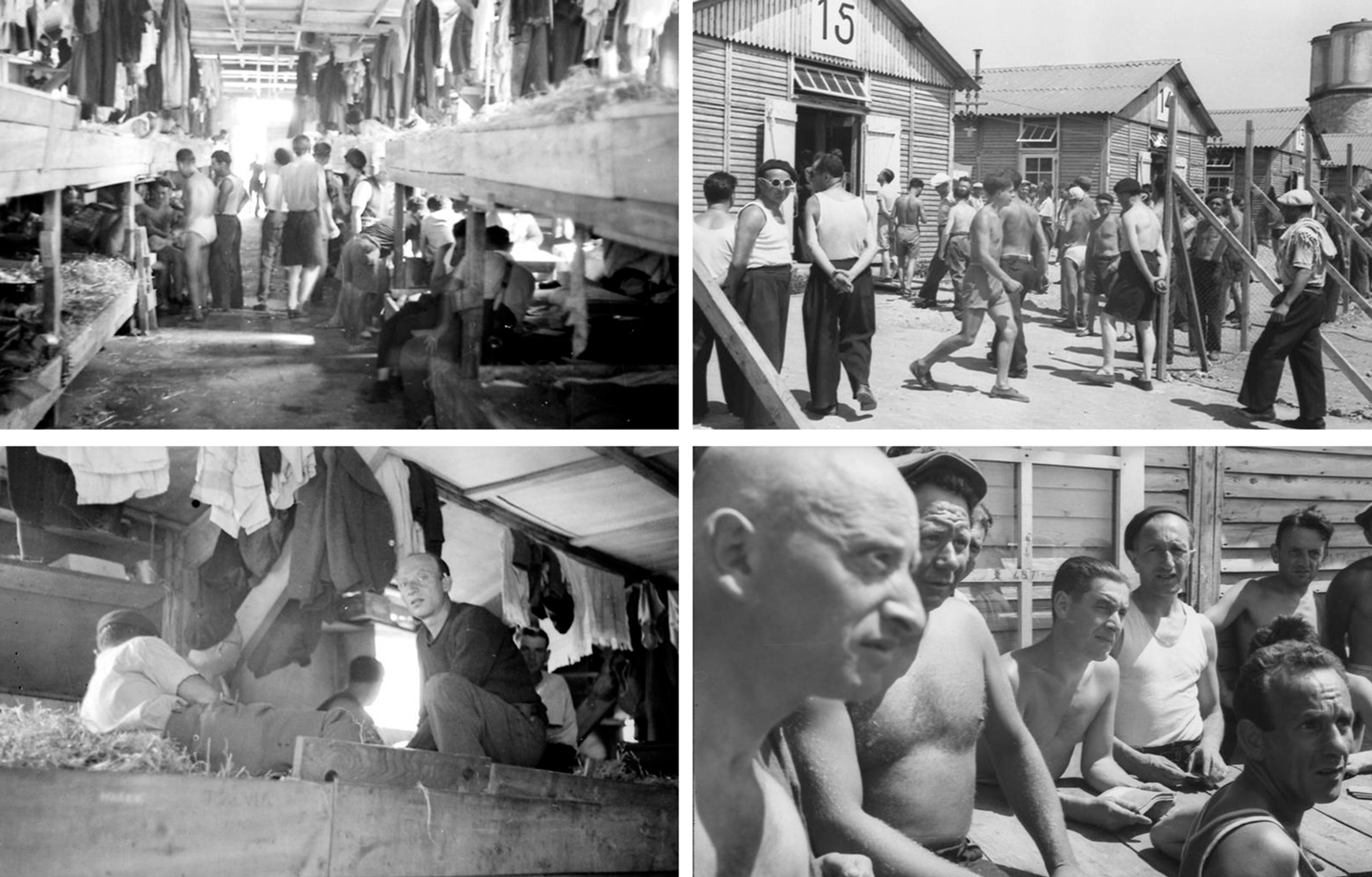
- Prisoners outside the barracks at Beaune-la-Rolande (Note: Most photographs in this article were taken by members of the German Propaganda Kompanie (PK), a Wehrmacht unit under the authority of Joseph Goebbels' Ministry of Propaganda. Following the 1940 Armistice, all press photography in occupied France was subject to strict German censorship. These images, though valuable as historical documents, were originally intended as propaganda and should be viewed in that context. Source: Mémorial de la Shoah (2021). "La rafle du Billet Vert" (PDF). Archived (PDF) from the original on 7 May 2025.)

- Location of Beaune-la-Rolande in France
- Coordinates: 48.0715°N 2.4348°E
- Location: Beaune-la-Rolande, Loiret, German-occupied France
- Operated by: French authorities (under German supervision); Nazi Germany
- Commandant: Commandant de Taddey (1941); Commandant Lombart (1943 (Note: Lombart is documented as camp head in March 1943, though he may have served before or after this date.))
- Original use: Prisoner-of-war camp
- Operational: 14 May 1941 – 12 July 1943 (Note: The camp officially ceased operation on 12 July 1943; final closure was completed on 4 August 1943.)
- Inmates: Foreign-born Jews from the Paris region (primarily Polish, Czech, Austrian and German)
- Number of inmates: 6,800 (Note: Figure reflects Jewish detainees held between 14 May 1941 and 12 July 1943.)
- Killed: 6,400 deported to Auschwitz
- Notable inmates: René Blum, Zber, Ralph Erwin, Adélaïde Hautval, Joseph Weismann

The Beaune-la-Rolande internment camp was a transit and detention facility (Note: Transit camps briefly held prisoners before deportation to other Nazi camps.) operated by French and German authorities in Nazi-occupied France during the Second World War. Built in 1939 in the Beaune-la-Rolande commune, Loiret, to house German prisoners of war, it was repurposed after France's defeat in 1940 to detain French POWs. From 1941, it was used to intern foreign-born Jews living in the Paris region. In May 1942, following the establishment of direct German control, mass deportations to extermination camps, primarily Auschwitz, began. Among the victims were more than 1,500 children arrested during the Vel' d'Hiv Roundup and deported via Beaune-la-Rolande to Auschwitz, where most were murdered.

After returning to French control in September 1942, the camp was used to hold political prisoners and individuals considered "non-deportable" before its closure in August 1943. Alongside Drancy and Pithiviers, Beaune-la-Rolande formed part of the core internment and deportation infrastructure in the northern zone. An estimated 6,800 Jews passed through the camp; most were deported to Auschwitz and killed. Notable detainees included the impresario René Blum and physician Adélaïde Hautval. The camp remains a focus of Holocaust memory, education and historical research in France.

== Background ==
Following the defeat of France in June 1940 and the signing of the Armistice, Marshal Philippe Pétain was granted full powers by the French Parliament on 10 July 1940, marking the end of the Third Republic and inaugurating an authoritarian collaborationist government. The country was divided into two zones: the Occupied Zone under direct German military control, and the so-called Free Zone administered by the Vichy regime. The Vichy regime rapidly enacted antisemitic laws and cooperated with German authorities in identifying, arresting, and interning Jews, Roma, political opponents, and other targeted groups.

In the Occupied Zone, the Germans operated their own facilities, including Frontstalag (camps for prisoners of war) and labour camps under the Organisation Todt. They also exercised control over internment camps formally administered by French prefectures. From 1941, foreign-born Jews were interned in a network of these camps, which, although nominally under French jurisdiction, functioned under close German supervision.

Beaune-la-Rolande, together with Pithiviers, Drancy and Compiègne, was among the most important internment camps in the occupied northern zone of France. Beaune-la-Rolande and Pithiviers were the first camps in the occupied zone to be opened specifically to Jewish detainees. Transfers between these camps were frequent and dictated by German authorities; detainees were deported in successive convoys to Auschwitz.

== History ==
=== Establishment as a prisoner-of-war camp (1939–1941) ===
Situated in the Loiret Département, approximately 90 kilometres (55 miles) south of Paris, Beaune-la-Rolande was originally built in 1939 to detain German prisoners of war. Following the Fall of France in June 1940, it was repurposed to hold French prisoners of war awaiting transfer to camps in Germany. The facility, spanning around three hectares, was secured by 14 barbed wire fences Beaune-la-Rolande was grouped administratively with the nearby Pithiviers camp under the designation Frontstalag 152, established by the Wehrmacht on 20 July 1940.

By mid-1940, conditions at Beaune-la-Rolande had deteriorated severely. Overcrowding became acute, with up to 14,000 prisoners confined at one point. French Red Cross reports documented widespread malnutrition, poor sanitation, and frequent disease outbreaks, particularly dysentery. Mortality rates were especially high among North African colonial troops. The Frontstalag 152 complex was ultimately dissolved on 21 March 1941.

=== Internment of foreign-born Jews (1941–1942) ===
Beaune-la-Rolande was repurposed as an internment and deportation centre for foreign-born Jews. The camp commandant was de Taddey, a French officer acting under German supervision. It was designated as a "1st category" internment facility, used primarily for detainees arrested at the demand of the German occupation authorities rather than through independent French police action. Beaune-la-Rolande and its twin site at Pithiviers were the first internment camps for Jews in the occupied zone. Both began receiving Jewish detainees on 14 May 1941, following a Vichy law issued on 4 October 1940, which authorised prefects to intern foreign Jews or assign them to forced residence without judicial oversight.

The first group of internees, primarily Polish Jews, arrived in May 1941 following the Green ticket roundup. French police had issued 6,500 summonses to Jewish men aged 18 to 60 without French citizenship. Around 3,700 responded and were immediately taken to the camps at Pithiviers and Beaune-la-Rolande. By October 1941, the camp held over 1,500 individuals of various nationalities, including Poles, Czechs, Austrians, Lithuanians and a small number of French. Prisoners were housed in 19 wooden barracks, surrounded by barbed wire and guarded by French gendarmes and auxiliary personnel. Initially, limited contact with the outside world was permitted, including visits and parcels. The barracks were unfurnished except for straw bedding, and living conditions were poor.

In the weeks following the Green Ticket roundup, families appealed to French authorities for the release of detained relatives. Between mid-May and late June 1941, around 200 men were freed from Beaune-la-Rolande, primarily those who were seriously ill, under 18, over 55, or recognised war veterans. (Note: Between June and September 1941, a total of 232 men were released from Beaune-la-Rolande) After 27 June, releases were suspended on German orders pending a review of medical procedures. After that, only 23 further releases were authorised, despite a camp population of nearly 2,000.

Over the summer, daily life settled into a regimented routine. Some internees worked as cooks, barbers, gardeners, or tailors; others laboured on nearby farms, drained swampland or took jobs in sugar and molasses factories. Proximity to the Pithiviers camp, located 18 kilometres (11 miles) away, reinforced their joint function as primary detention sites for Jews in the northern zone.

Escape attempts were frequent, especially during work assignments outside the camp. Between July and August 1941, an estimated 313 prisoners escaped, out of a total camp population of approximately 2,000. Some gendarmes covertly aided internees, facilitated by the fact that many worked outside the camp. From autumn 1941, surveillance at the camp was tightened under German pressure. According to a 1942 camp report, the camp's security force comprised over 170 personnel, armed with rifles and pistols.

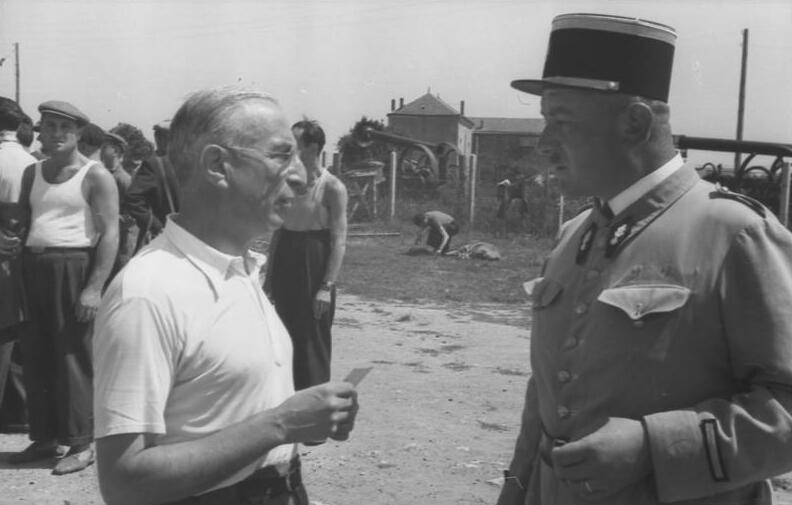
A prisoner in conversation with a French gendarme

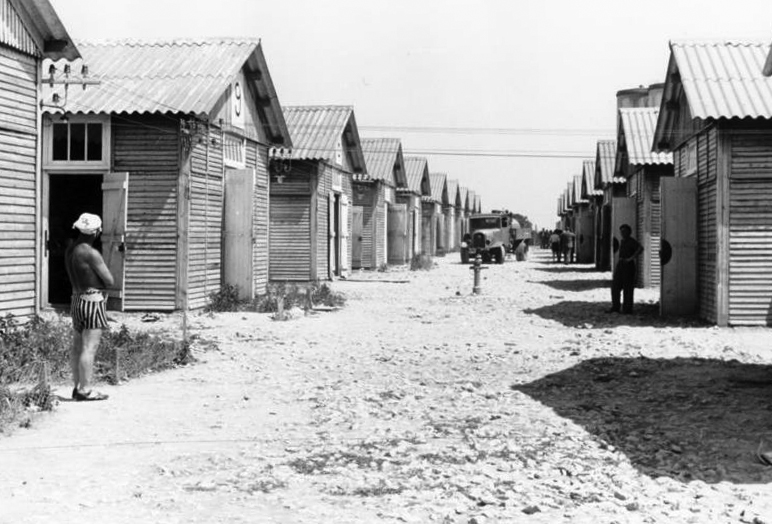
Main street of the camp with barracks and prisoners

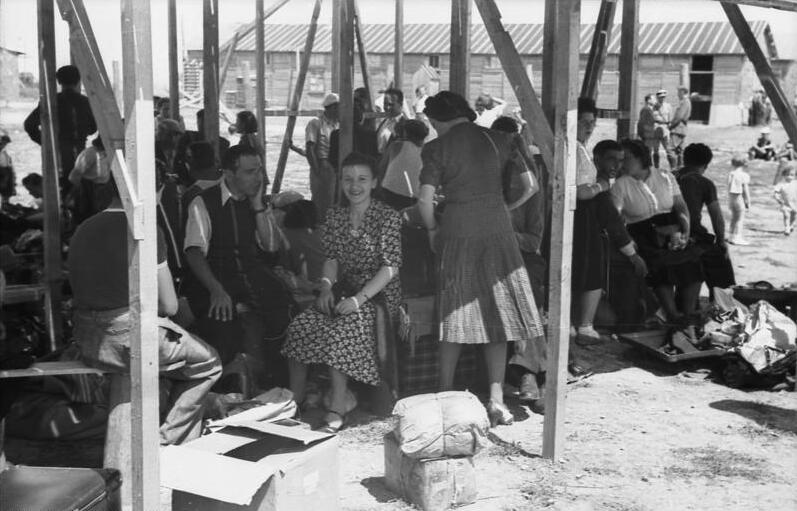
Prisoners with belongings under shelter at Beaune-la-Rolande

=== German takeover and deportations (1942) ===
==== German takeover and first deportations ====
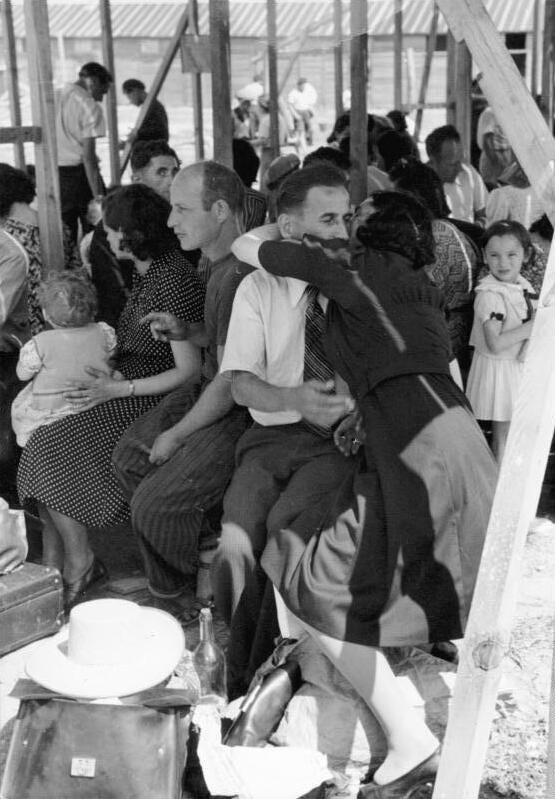
Jewish detainees at Beaune-la-Rolande

In May 1942, German authorities assumed direct control of Beaune-la-Rolande, acting on orders from SS officer Theodor Dannecker. External work assignments were suspended and prisoners were confined within the camp perimeter.

Systematic deportations from Beaune-la-Rolande began in June 1942, with successive convoys sent to Auschwitz in German-occupied Poland. Some deportees were transferred to Drancy internment camp before further deportation. Situated on the northeastern edge of Beaune-la-Rolande, the camp was at the opposite end of town from the railway station. As a result, each convoy's arrival or departure required internees to march through the town centre.

Convoy 5 departed on 28 June 1942 with 1,038 deportees: 1,004 men and 34 women. Most were foreign-born Jews arrested in previous roundups; an additional 108 were added from the Orléans region. Of the 965 individuals whose nationality was recorded, the majority were Polish, with others listed as Czech, Russian, Austrian, Romanian, and stateless. Convoy 5 departed Beaune-la-Rolande at 5:20 am on 28 June 1942 and continued to Auschwitz, where most deportees were murdered shortly after arrival. Only 55 survivors were recorded. On 17 July 55 more detainees were transferred from Beaune-la-Rolande to Pithiviers to complete a transport of 928 individuals, which departed two days later.

==== Vel' d'Hiv Roundup and families ====
These early deportations were followed by the Vel' d'Hiv Roundup, one of the most extensive mass arrests of Jews in France. According to Michael Dickerman and Paul Bartrop, between 16 and 17 July 1942, French police arrested 13,152 Jews, men, women and children, confining them in the Vélodrome d'Hiver, a cycling stadium in Paris. From 19 to 22 July, families with children were transferred to the internment camps at Pithiviers and Beaune-la-Rolande, to await deportation. All the other adults with no children were transferred to Drancy and from there deported to Auschwitz. Beaune-la-Rolande was unprepared for the arrival. On 19 July, the police intendant reported multiple problems to the regional prefect, including inadequate food supplies and a lack of plates and cups. Medical staff were also lacking and the few Red Cross nurses were unable to provide adequate care. All contact with the outside world was cut off. Children aged two to thirteen were separated from their mothers. Overcrowding, food shortages, and outbreaks of measles and diphtheria led to several child deaths.

==== Convoy 15 and separation of children ====
Convoy 15 departed on 5 August 1942, carrying about 1,000 deportees. (Note: Rutkowski gives 1,014 deportees (589 women and 425 men), while Klarsfeld reports 1,013 (588 women and 425 men).) A large proportion of the women were aged between 34 and 50, and many of the men were between 39 and 49. The group included 176 girls aged 13 to 21 and 93 boys aged 13 to 19, some of whom were deported alongside their mothers. Although German authorities had stated that children under 16 were not to be deported at that stage, approximately 160 children aged 12 to 15 had been included in the transport list. On the orders of the German authorities, the children were forcibly separated from their mothers and removed from the convoy to comply with the restriction. (Note: Among those removed was Joseph Weismann, later one of the few children to escape deportation from Beaune-la-Rolande. He was separated from his parents and sister, who were deported and murdered.) The train departed Beaune-la-Rolande under escort by French gendarmes. Of the recorded nationalities, 672 were Polish, 86 Russian, 16 German, five French, two Czech, two Turkish, two Romanian, one Austrian, and 108 were undetermined. On arrival at Auschwitz on 7 August 214 men and 96 women were selected for forced labour; the remaining deportees were killed. Only six survivors were known by 1945. On the same day, another 423 internees were transferred from Beaune to Pithiviers to fill transport quotas.

By 8 August 1942, approximately 1,500 children remained at Beaune-la-Rolande, overseen by a small number of interned social workers and doctors. Their deportation, proposed by Vichy prime minister Pierre Laval, was awaiting a final decision from Berlin. Many of the children were under twelve and held in increasingly overcrowded and precarious conditions. In early August, permission for the deportation of children came from Berlin.

==== Deportation of children, August 1942 ====
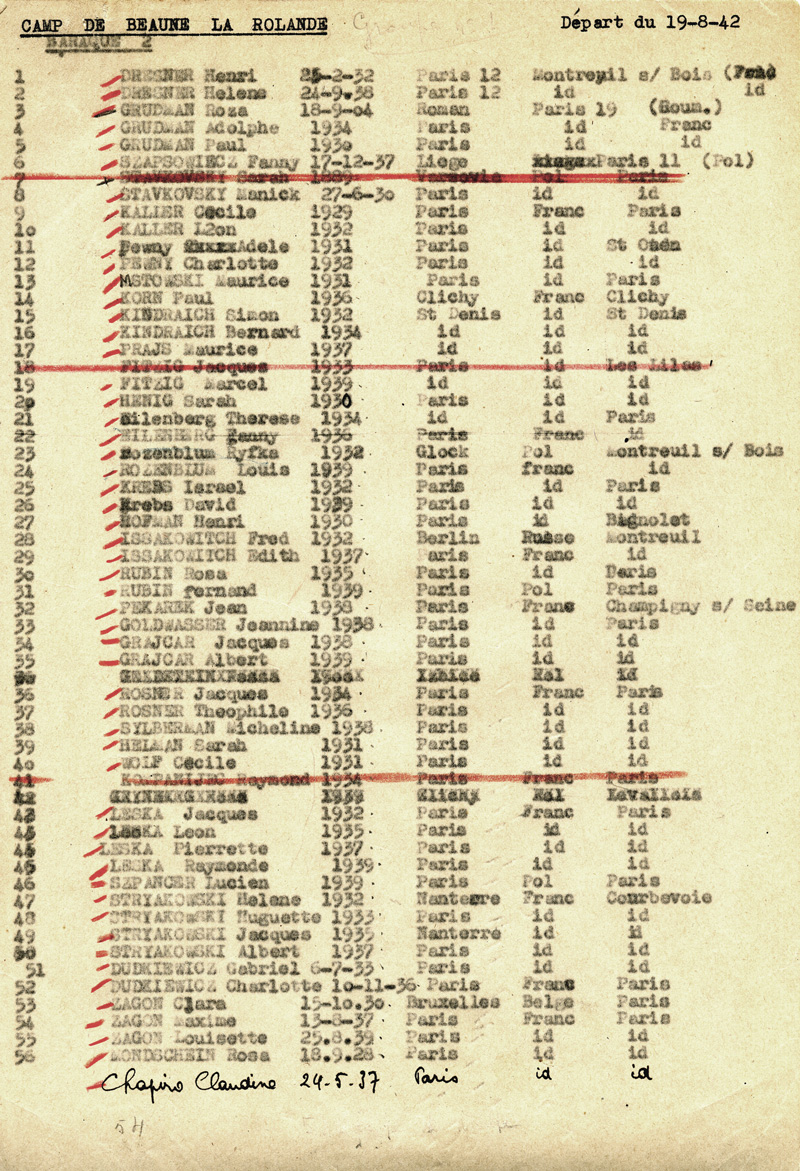
Excerpt from the official transfer list of internees, primarily children, transferred from Beaune-la-Rolande to Drancy on 19 August 1942, before being deported to Auschwitz

Convoy of 19 August 1942 departed with 1,199 Jews, consisting almost entirely of women and young children. Many of the children had already been separated from their parents, who had been deported in earlier convoys. They were taken from the camp to the railway station and packed into SNCF freight wagons, around fifty per car. Each child wore a metal tag for identification. The train, escorted by 22 French gendarmes, reached Drancy the same day. Within days, they were deported to Auschwitz in two groups, on 21 and 24 August, and murdered upon arrival. A further transfer of 377 detainees to Drancy took place on 25 August; most were later deported to Auschwitz. (Note: Although Berlin approved the deportation of children to Auschwitz, they could not be sent directly from the Loiret camps. Adolf Eichmann had explicitly forbidden transports made up solely of children. Instead, they had to be transferred to Drancy and integrated into mixed convoys with adults, mainly from the southern zone, likely to create the impression that they were being deported alongside their parents.)

=== Final phase and closure (1942–1943) ===
In September 1942, the administration of Beaune-la-Rolande reverted to French control. The camp was repurposed primarily to hold political prisoners, especially communists, and individuals considered "non-deportable" including women and children of POWs, spouses of non-Jews and those classified as "friends of Jews". Although large-scale Jewish deportations had ceased, the camp remained integrated within the internment system, functioning as an overflow site for detainees from Drancy.

Following a major deportation from Pithiviers to Auschwitz on 21 September 1942, the remaining Jewish internees at Pithiviers were moved to Beaune-la-Rolande on 1 October. The camp continued functioning as a secondary holding site for Jews caught while attempting to cross the demarcation line or transferred from Drancy because they were not eligible for deportation.

By 1943, command had passed to Lombart, who is documented as camp head in March 1943. (Note: According to contemporary accounts, Lombart was publicly denounced during a broadcast of the Free French radio programme Les Français parlent aux Français, in which the announcer warned that his treatment of internees was known and that he had been "sentenced to death".) On 9 March 1943, approximately 1,200 individuals classified as non-deportable were transferred to Beaune-la-Rolande. Two weeks later, on 23 March, around 700 French nationals were returned to Drancy. A further transfer of 105 detainees to Drancy took place on 19 June.

Following a visit to Beaune-la-Rolande on 10 July 1943, SS officer Alois Brunner, commandant of Drancy, ordered the closure of the camp. The remaining internees were divided between transfer to Drancy and assignment to forced labour under Organisation Todt. Acting in his capacity as deputy head of the RSHA IV B4 (Jewish Affairs), Brunner ordered the liquidation of the camp beginning on 12 July 1943. He directed that all remaining deportable internees, including those hospitalised, be transferred to Drancy, while non-deportable prisoners, primarily half-Jews and spouses of non-Jews, were sent west to Cherbourg for forced labour. Owing to technical difficulties, the closure process was completed on 4 August 1943. The final group of 59 internees, previously assigned to agricultural labour, left on 5 August for transfer to Drancy.

Documented transfers and deportations from Beaune-la-Rolande (1942–1943)
Date	Route	Number	Notes
8 May 1942	To Compiègne internment camp	136	
28 June 1942	To Auschwitz extermination camp (Convoy 5)	1,038	
17 July 1942	To Pithiviers internment camp	55	
5 August 1942	To Auschwitz extermination camp (Convoy 15)	~1,000	
7 August 1942	To Pithiviers	423	
19 August 1942	To Drancy internment camp	1,196	(Note: Yad Vashem gives 1,199)
25 August 1942	To Drancy	377	
15 September 1942	Unknown	45	
21 September 1942	To Pithiviers	324	
30 January 1943	To Drancy	74	
23 March 1943	To Drancy	~700	
2 April 1943	To Drancy	10	
19 June 1943	To Drancy	105	
12 July 1943	To Drancy	Unknown	
16 July 1943	To Cherbourg	~300	
5 August 1943	To Drancy	59	

In 1948, the wooden barracks were sold as surplus. Over the following years, all visible traces of the site were erased. In 1963, a vocational agricultural college, the Lycée Professionnel Agricole de Beaune-la-Rolande, was built on the former camp grounds.

== Memory and commemoration ==
=== Notable detainees ===
Several prominent individuals were imprisoned at Beaune-la-Rolande prior to their deportation or release, including artists, intellectuals, and cultural figures:

- René Blum, French Jewish theatre producer and founder of the Ballet de l'Opéra in Monte Carlo. He was transferred to Beaune-la-Rolande on 20 September 1942, then to Drancy several days later from where he was deported.
- Ralph Erwin, Austrian-born composer, best known for the song "Ich küsse Ihre Hand, Madame". He died while imprisoned at Beaune-la-Rolande.
- Adélaïde Hautval, French physician and psychiatrist, later recognised as one of the Righteous Among the Nations. She provided clandestine medical care while imprisoned at Ravensbrück and Auschwitz after her deportation.
- Joseph Weismann, child survivor who escaped from Beaune-la-Rolande. His testimony later inspired the film La Rafle (The Roundup) and the memoir After the Roundup.
- Zber, Polish Jewish painter who created artworks during his internment. He was later deported to Auschwitz and killed.

=== Memorials ===
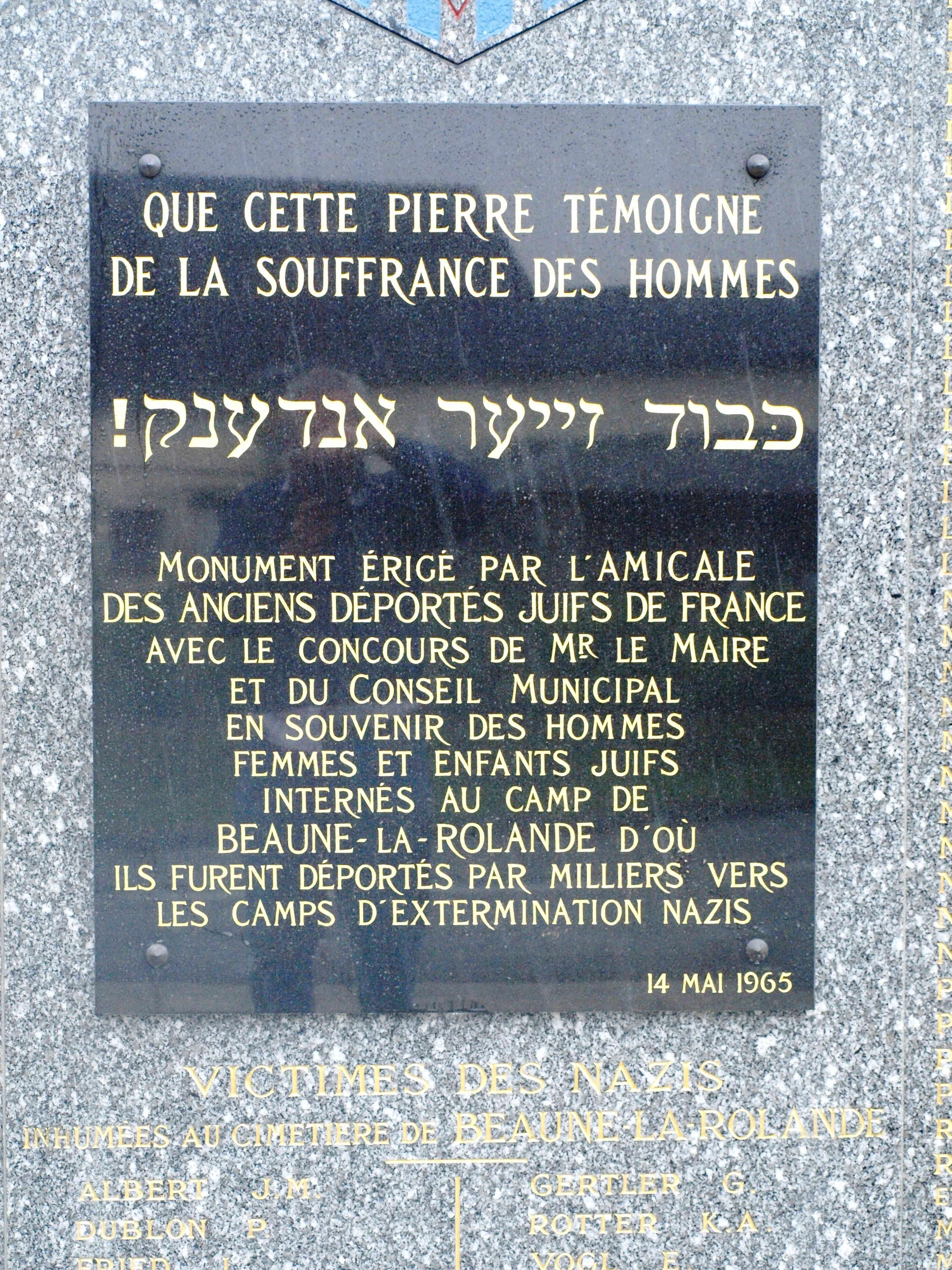
Commemorative stele (1965)

In the decades following the war, formal commemorations were established at the site of Beaune-la-Rolande. A commemorative stele was installed in 1965, bearing a bilingual inscription:

Que cette pierre témoigne de la souffrance des hommes

[May this stone bear witness to the suffering of men]

A larger memorial, built from black marble and inscribed with a gold Star of David, was inaugurated on 14 May 1989. It lists the names of 310 deported families identified through archival research.

In 1994, a plaque was placed on the façade of the former railway station used for deportations, installed by the Association des Fils et Filles des Déportés Juifs de France. In 2008, remnants of Barrack No. 4, one of the camp's original wooden buildings, were recovered and reconstructed at the Musée-Mémorial des Enfants du Vel' d'Hiv in Orléans. That same year, the Mémorial de la Shoah in Paris organised the exhibition Derniers Souvenirs ("Last Memories"), featuring objects created by prisoners at Beaune-la-Rolande and Pithiviers during the early months of internment.

In 2013, a second camp barrack was discovered in a private garden, where it had stood since being sold in 1948. Donated to the Cercil museum, it was found to contain detainees' graffiti, names, and a message dated 6 August 1942: "En souvenir pour ceux qui passeront ici" ("In memory for those who will pass through here"). The inscription was authenticated in October 2013 by a graphologist as the handwriting of Emma Korenbajzer, a Jewish mother later deported and murdered at Auschwitz, together with her daughter Aline. The structure was dismantled and preserved for study.

Today, all visible traces of the camp have disappeared. Only the street name rue des Déportés and the commemorative stele remain. Since 1991, the Musée Mémorial des enfants du Vel' d'Hiv in Orléans has been responsible for preserving and transmitting the history of the Beaune-la-Rolande camp. Each year, a commemorative ceremony is held by local associations on the second Sunday of May.

=== Representation in media and literature ===
Beaune-la-Rolande has been depicted in several works of literature, film, and documentary focusing on the Holocaust in France:

- Sarah's Key (2010), a film adaptation of Tatiana de Rosnay's novel, includes scenes set at Beaune-la-Rolande.
- The Round Up (2010), a French historical drama, portrays the Vel' d'Hiv Roundup and the internment of Jewish families at the camp.
- Illusions perdues 1941–1942. Fragments d'une vie en sursis (2011), a documentary film, explores Jewish internment at Beaune-la-Rolande.
- Beaune-la-Rolande (2003), a novel by Cécile Wajsbrot, examines memory and trauma linked to the camp.
- After the Roundup: Escape and Survival in Hitler's France (2017), a memoir by Joseph Weismann, recounts his experiences as a child survivor who escaped from the camp.
- La petite fille du Vel' d'Hiv (1991), a memoir by Annette Muller, describes her arrest and detention at Beaune-la-Rolande.
- On n'oubliera pas. Beaune-la-Rolande 1942 (2025), a documentary broadcast by France 3, examines the camp's role during the Holocaust.

=== Historical legacy ===
The Beaune-la-Rolande internment camp has become a symbol of French collaboration in the Holocaust. Historians such as Denis Peschanski, Renée Poznanski, and Annette Wieviorka have highlighted the camp's role in the broader system of internment and deportation in Nazi camps in France. The mass deportation and murder of over 1,500 children from Beaune-la-Rolande, following the Vel' d'Hiv Roundup, remains one of the most extensively documented episodes of French complicity. Historian Susan Zuccotti describes it as "the most horrifying, heartrending episode of the Holocaust in France, and the most shameful". Today, the camp is featured in museum exhibitions and memorial initiatives that commemorate the Holocaust in France.

== See also ==
- The Holocaust in France
- Holocaust train
