= Beaune-la-Rolande =

- Commune
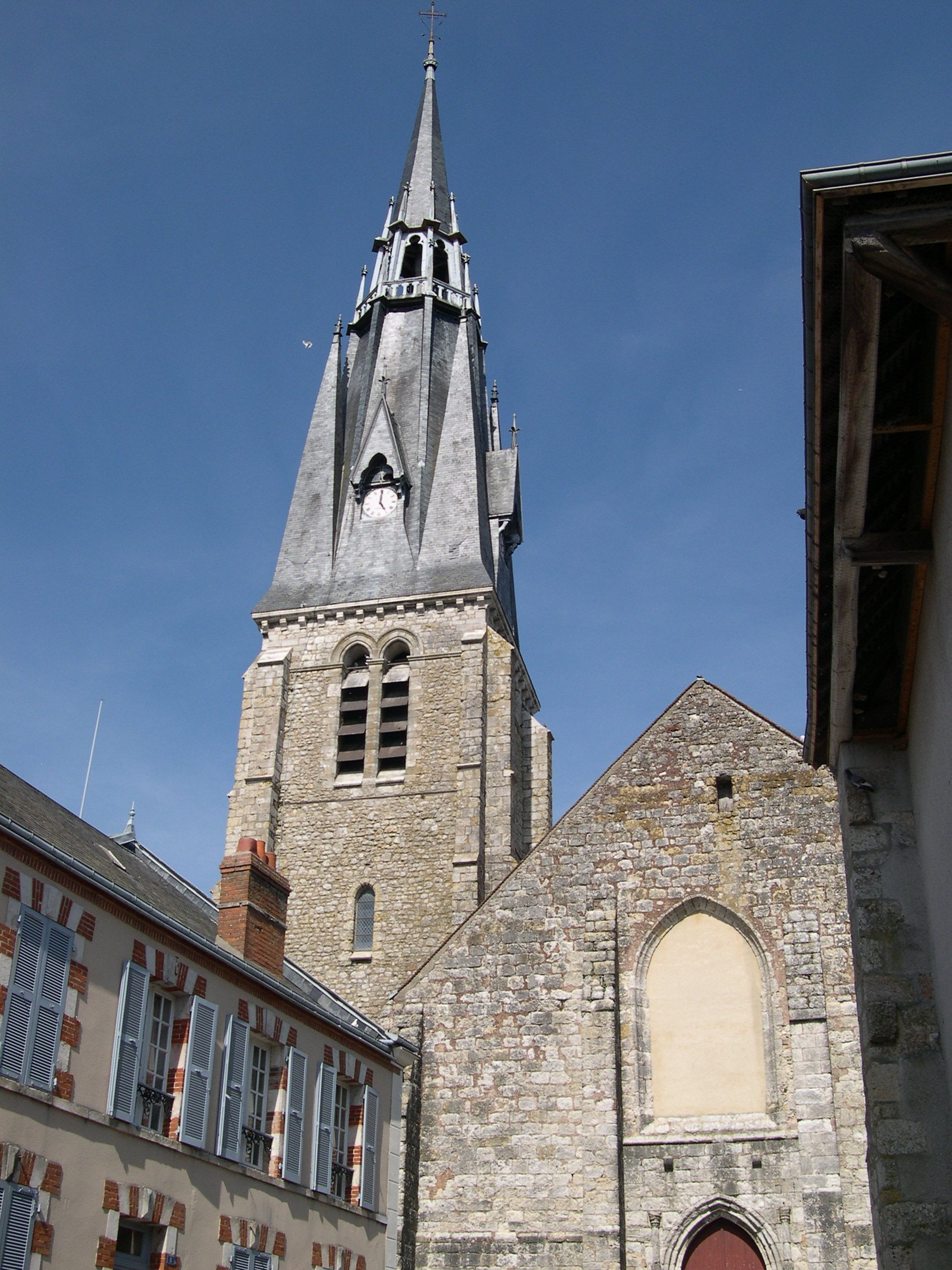
- Church of Saint Martin

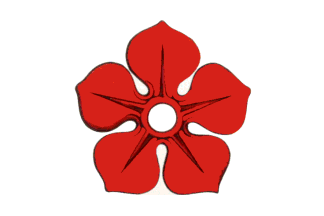
- Flag Coat of arms
- Location of Beaune-la-Rolande
- Location within France Location within Centre-Val de Loire
- Coordinates: 48°04′14″N 2°25′48″E
- Country: France
- Region: Centre-Val de Loire
- Department: Loiret
- Arrondissement: Pithiviers
- Canton: Le Malesherbois
- Intercommunality: Pithiverais-Gâtinais

Government
  - Mayor (2026–32): Michel Masson
- Area^{1}: 20.55 km^{2} (7.93 sq mi)
- Highest elevation: 119 m (390 ft)
- Lowest elevation: 91 m (299 ft)
- Population (2023): 1,992
  - Density: 96.93/km^{2} (251.1/sq mi)
- Time zone: UTC+01:00 (CET)
  - Summer (DST): UTC+02:00 (CEST)
- INSEE/Postal code: 45030 /45340
- ^{1} French Land Register data, which excludes lakes, ponds, glaciers > 1 km^{2} (0.386 sq mi or 247 acres) and river estuaries.

Beaune-la-Rolande (French pronunciation: [bon la ʁɔlɑ̃d]) is a commune in the Loiret department in north-central France.

== History ==
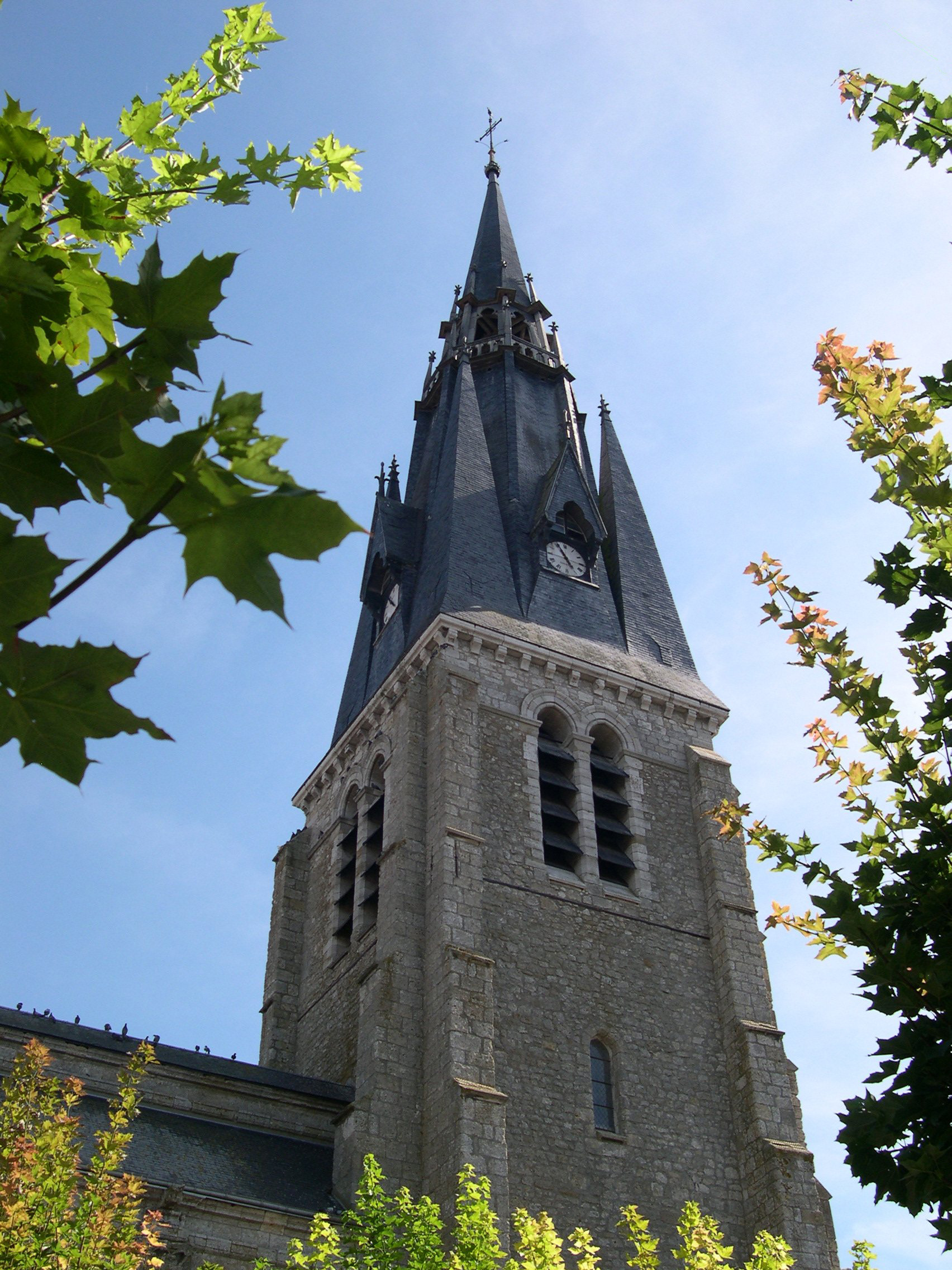
Belltower of Saint-Martin church

On 28 November 1870 it was the site of a battle during the Franco-Prussian War, in which French impressionist painter Frédéric Bazille was killed.

During World War II, it was the site of the Nazi Beaune-la-Rolande internment camp, a transit and deportation center for Jews closely associated with the Pithiviers internment camp. Eighteen thousand Jews were held at Beaune-la-Rolande; most of them were transported to Auschwitz where they were murdered.

The Polish artist Zber was imprisoned there from 1941 to 1942, and the composer Ralph Erwin died there.

== Population ==
Historical population

Year	Pop.	±% p.a.
1793	2,028	—
1821	2,169	+0.24%
1846	2,174	+0.01%
1872	1,818	−0.69%
1901	1,860	+0.08%
1926	1,695	−0.37%
1946	1,765	+0.20%
1962	1,758	−0.02%
1968	1,792	+0.32%

Year	Pop.	±% p.a.
1975	1,929	+1.06%
1982	1,928	−0.01%
1990	1,877	−0.33%
1999	2,102	+1.27%
2007	2,062	−0.24%
2012	1,988	−0.73%
2017	2,008	+0.20%
2023	1,992	−0.13%

Source: EHESS and INSEE (1968–2023)

== See also ==
- Communes of the Loiret department
