= Escapees' Medal =

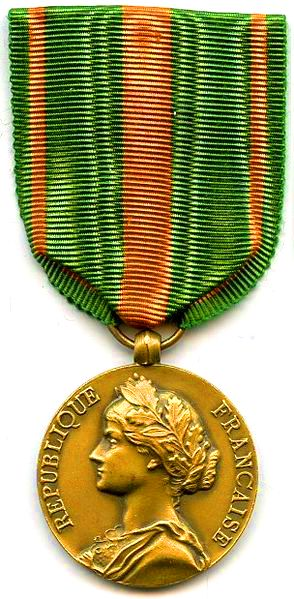
- Escapees' Medal (obverse)
- Type: Military medal
- Awarded for: Successful escape from internment
- Presented by: France
- Status: Active
- Established: 20 August 1926
- Ribbon for the Escapees' Medal

Precedence
- Next (higher): Ordre des Arts et des Lettres
- Next (lower): Croix du combattant volontaire 1914-1918

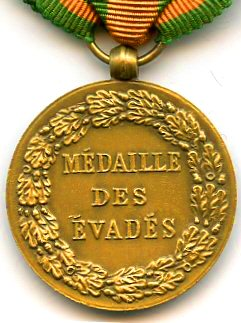
Reverse of the Escapees' Medal

The Escapees' Medal (French: Médaille des Évadés) is a military award bestowed by the government of France to individuals who were prisoners of war and who successfully escaped internment or died as a result of their escape attempt. The "Escapees' Medal" was established by a 1926 law, intended to honour combatants not only of the First World War, but also of the Franco-Prussian War of 1870. Its statute was later amended to include combatants of the Second World War and later conflicts.

== Award statute ==
The award criteria for the Franco-Prussian War was established by law on 2 October 1926 and read as follows:

- To French soldiers serving during the Franco-Prussian War, who successfully escaped their internment in Germany.

The award criteria for the First World War were established by decree on 7 April 1927 and read as follows:

- To French soldiers serving during the First World War, who were taken prisoner during combat either in Europe or in an external theatre of operations, and who successfully escaped, regardless of the length of their internment;
- To citizens of Alsace-Lorraine, who, between 2 August 1914 and 1 November 1918, deserted from the German army.
- To civilians interned in Germany, or living in territories occupied by the enemy, who crossed enemy lines with the intent of making themselves available to the French military authority.

The award criteria for the Second World War were long in coming. A decree of 7 February 1959 allowed for award of the medal, followed by an Order on 20 May 1959 and detailed instructions on 10 July 1959. The medal was bestowed to persons able to prove a successful escape:

- From a prisoner of war camp;
- From a place of internment where they were being held for acts related to the resistance;
- From enemy held or controlled territory, an escape including the clandestine crossing of a front line or customs checkpoint;

To persons able to prove:

- Two escape attempts followed by disciplinary measures;
- A single escape attempt resulting in a transfer to a punitive establishment or by deportation measures recognised for the award of the Croix du combattant volontaire de la Résistance;
- To citizens of Alsace-Lorraine forcibly incorporated into the German armed forces, who deserted in order to serve in the resistance or in the allied armies;
- To citizens of Alsace-Lorraine who escaped from their provinces in order to fight the enemy;

These actions are only considered for bestowal of the medal if they occurred between 2 September 1939 and 15 August 1945.

The medal can be awarded to both French citizens and foreign nationals serving in the ranks of the French armed forces. Civilians and members of the military killed, or who have died as a result of wounds received during an escape attempt, are automatically awarded the medal.

A decree of 28 December 1981 states that "any person eligible for the "Escapees' Medal" is asked to put forward a request".

There is only one military unit that has been awarded the medal, the 2nd Dragoon Regiment, which received it in 1945, after the entire regiment decided to escape the German occupation of Vichy France (Case Anton) in November 1942. Some members of the regiment went into the resistance, and others joined the Free French in Africa; one officer eventually reached Algiers still carrying the regimental standard.

A survivor of the Vel' d'Hiv Roundup, Joseph Weismann, was awarded the Escapees' Medal in 2014 even though he did not meet the criteria set out in the 1959 decree. At the age of 11, Weismann had escaped from Beaune-la-Rolande transit camp, where the French authorities interned Jews who were to be sent to Auschwitz concentration camp. Weismann had been applying for the Escapees' Medal over a period of about 15 years before the French government finally awarded it to him.

== Award description ==
The Escapees' Medal is a 30 mm in diameter circular medal struck from bronze. Its design is from the French engraver A. Dubois. Its obverse bears the relief left profile bust of Marianne (representing the French Republic) crowned with branches of oak, along the outer circumference, the relief inscription (French: REPUBLIQUE FRANCAISE) "FRENCH REPUBLIC". On its reverse, at center, the relief inscription on three rows (French: MÉDAILLE DES ÉVADÉS) (ESCAPEES' MEDAL) surrounded by a wreath of oak branches.

The medal is suspended by a ring through the suspension loop to a 36 mm wide green silk moiré ribbon with a 7 mm wide central orange stripe and 2 mm wide longitudinal orange stripes located 2 mm from the ribbon's outer edges.

== Notable recipients (partial list) ==
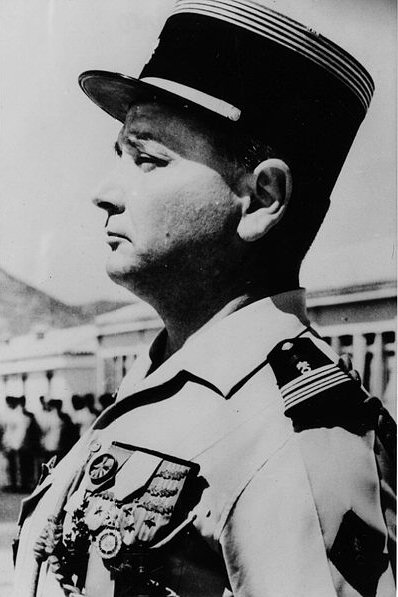
Colonel Paul Arnaud de Foïard, a recipient of the Escapees' Medal

- General Charles de Gaulle
- General Philippe Leclerc de Hauteclocque
- General Marie-Pierre Kœnig
- Lieutenant General Marcel Bigeard
- Lieutenant-Colonel Dimitri Amilakhvari
- Journalist Michel Moine
- Foreign Legion Sergeant Peter J. Ortiz
- General Edgard de Larminat
- General Paul Arnaud de Foïard
- General Raoul Magrin-Vernerey
- Warrant Officer Raymond Duc
- Resistance leader Rene-Georges Laurin
- General Pierre Billotte
- General Jean de Lattre de Tassigny
- Resistance fighter Émile Allegret
- René Joyeuse
- Yves Congar, later Cardinal

== See also ==
- Prisoner of war
- Prisoner-of-war camp
- List of prisoners of war
