= Zberg =

Zberg is a surname. Notable people with the surname include:

- Beat Zberg (born 1971), Swiss cyclist
- Luzia Zberg (born 1970), Swiss cyclist
- Markus Zberg (born 1974), Swiss cyclist, brother of Beat

== See also ==
- Berg (surname)
- Zber (1909–1942), Jewish artist
