= Annette Muller =

French writer and Holocaust survivor (1933–2021)

- Born: 15 March 1933; Paris, France
- Died: 9 August 2021 (aged 88); Le Blanc-Mesnil, France
- Occupation: Writer

Annette Muller (15 March 1933 – 9 August 2021) was a French writer and Holocaust survivor. She was an escapee of the Vel' d'Hiv Roundup. Her autobiography, La petite fille du Vel' d'Hiv, published in 1991, gives rare accounts of the roundup and the destiny of her fellow prisoners.

== Biography ==
Muller was born in Paris on 15 March 1933 to a family of Polish Jews from Tarnów who emigrated to France in 1929. Her mother, Rachel Muller, was born on 16 October 1908 in Wojnicz, and her father, Manek, was a communist militant and tailor. She grew up poor with three siblings: Henri, Jean, and Michel. Her father was a member of the Main-d'œuvre immigrée and the General Confederation of Labour.

Following anti-Semitic discrimination, Muller's father was laid off. Days before the roundup, he was warned and managed to hide in Creil. At the start of the roundup, her older brothers, Henri and Jean, escaped to the Daughters of Charity of Saint Vincent de Paul orphanage in Neuilly-sur-Seine. However, Annette, her mother, and her brother, Michel, were arrested and held at the Vélodrome d'Hiver, where the siblings were separated from their mother and subject to neglect and abuse from guards.

Muller's mother managed to bribe a guard and send a letter to her husband, and was later sent to Auschwitz. Later that year, she was murdered in the camp at the age of 33. Muller and her brother were sent to Drancy internment camp before escaping with the help of the other two brothers and the Union générale des israélites de France. They stayed at the Catholic orphanage before moving to another in Le Mans, where they stayed until 1947.

Following the Liberation of Paris, Muller married Daniel Bessmann, a former resistant in Basses-Alpes and later worked various jobs.

Muller published her autobiography in 1991, titled La petite fille du Vel d'Hiv : Du camp d'internement de Beaune-la-Rolande (1942) à la maison d'enfants du Mans (1947) and published by Éditions Denoël. The story was made up of three parts: her childhood, the early stages of World War II, and the Vel' d'Hiv Roundup. Throughout her later life, she was adamant about maintaining the memory of the Holocaust so that it can never be repeated.

Annette Muller died in Le Blanc-Mesnil on 9 August 2021 at the age of 88.

== Publications ==
- La petite fille du Vel d'Hiv : Du camp d'internement de Beaune-la-Rolande (1942) à la maison d'enfants du Mans (1947) (1991)

== Filmography ==
- Les Enfants du Vel d'Hiv (1992)
- The Round Up (2010)
- Un voyage pas comme les autres (2011)
