= René-Georges Laurin =

French politician

René-Georges Laurin (Paris, 2 May 1921 - Saint-Raphaël (Var), 29 April 2006) was a French politician.

He was born in the 10th arrondissement of Paris and raised in a very modest environment. He became a highly respected appraiser, a militant of the French Resistance, mayor of Saint-Raphael, and senator of the Var. His political affiliation was the right-wing party Rally for the Republic (RPR) which merged to Union for a Popular Movement (UMP) in 2002.

== Involvement in the French Resistance ==
He began his activist involvement with the Young Christian Workers (Jeunesse Ouvrière Chrétien) in 1936. He became a militant of the French Resistance in 1940 and was one of the founders of the Movement of Young Christian Fighters (Mouvement des Jenues Chretiens Combattants) in 1943. The movement was later fused with the Movement of the United Resistants (Mouvement des Unies Résistents) to become the New French Youth (Nouvelle Jeunesse Francaise) of which he was the secretary-general. This movement was one of many underground networks under the organization the United Forces of the Patriotic Youth (Forces Unies de la Jeunesse Patriotique) that organized actions to inform the population, espionage to retrieve information, and sabotage or organization of military operations against the Axis powers. In 1944 he was captured and imprisoned in Fresnes by the Gestapo but escaped from the train transferring him to Mauthausen. He returned to Paris under a fake identity and became a militant activist participant in the Liberation of Paris of 1944.

== Political mandates ==
He was first named Youth Delegate (Delegue des Jeunes) of the Provisional Consultative Assembly from 1944 to 1945 and then was appointment press attaché to the cabinet of General Charles de Gaulle from 1946 to 1947 where he began his political career. His was elected as deputy to represent the Var Union for the New Republic at the National Assembly in 1958, and reelected in 1962 under UNR-UDT until 1967. He was Mayor of Saint-Raphael from 1961 to 1965 and then from 1977 to 1992 after which he had reached the quota of mandates allowed by the law of cumulative quotas. He was elected General Council of the Var from 1973 to 1989. He was elected Senator of the Var on 28 September 1986, reelected on 24 September 1995, and then chose not to participate in the senatorial elections of 2004.

Mr. Laurin was fast to respond to his country's state; he left his university life to lead the life of a Resistant followed by a life of politics, though he remained above all a man passionate of his profession of appraiser. His career as an appraiser began in 1952 at Hotel Drouot, in collaboration with Maurice Rheims, where he forged his reputation as an expert in antique furniture. He continued to pursue his career as an appraiser throughout the years reconciling and harmonizing it with his political mandates and his family life.

== Family life ==
Mr. Laurin had two sons, Hervé and Thierry Laurin, from his first marriage to Viviane Mason De Tourbet. M Laurin remarried and shared his life with Danielle Couderc until his death in Saint-Raphael on 29 April 2006 after spending over sixty years of his life proudly devoted to the country he loved and respected above all.

== Medals received ==
Chevalier de la Légion d’Honneur, Médaille de la Résistance, Médaille des Évadés, Croix du combattant volontaire de la Résistance, and Commandeur de la Légion d’Honneur
