= I Kiss Your Hand, Madame =

1929 film

- Directed by: Robert Land
- Written by: Rolf E. Vanloo
- Produced by: Julius Haimann; Robert Land
- Starring: Harry Liedtke; Marlene Dietrich
- Cinematography: Carl Drews; Gotthardt Wolf
- Music by: Pasquale Perris
- Production company: Super-Film
- Distributed by: Deutsche Lichtspiel-Syndikat
- Release dates: 17 January 1929 (Germany); 17 August 1932 (U.S.)
- Running time: 70 minutes
- Country: Germany
- Languages: Sound; (Synchronized) German Intertitles

I Kiss Your Hand, Madame (German: Ich küsse Ihre Hand, Madame) is a 1929 sound German drama film directed by Robert Land starring Harry Liedtke and Marlene Dietrich. While the film has no audible dialog, it was released with a synchronized musical score with sound effects using both the sound-on-disc and sound-on-film process. It was released in the United States in 1932. It was produced by Super-Film.

The film's sets were designed by the art director Robert Neppach.

== Plot ==
Madame Gerard is a divorcee living the high life in Paris. Her current lover is the overweight Percy Talandier but then she meets Count Lerski and sets her sights on him. Then she hears from her ex-husband Adolphe that Lerski is not a count, but works as a waiter.

== Cast ==
- Harry Liedtke as Jacques/Count Lerski
- Marlene Dietrich as Laurence Gerard
- Pierre de Guingand as Adolphe Gerard
- Charles Puffy as Percy Talandier
- Richard Tauber as Vocalist

== Music ==
The theme song was entitled "Ich Küsse Ihre Hand Madame" with music by Ralph Erwin and lyrics by Fritz Rotter. The tenor Richard Tauber is heard on the soundtrack singing the theme song. The song became a world-wide hit for that year and was translated and recorded in dozens of languages. The English version was known as "I Kiss Your Hand, Madame."

== See also ==
- List of early sound feature films (1926–1929)

== Bibliography ==
- Chandler, Charlotte (2011). Marlene: Marlene Dietrich, a Personal Biography. New York: Simon & Schuster. ISBN 978-1-4391-8844-6.
