= Joseph Weismann =

French holocaust survivor and author

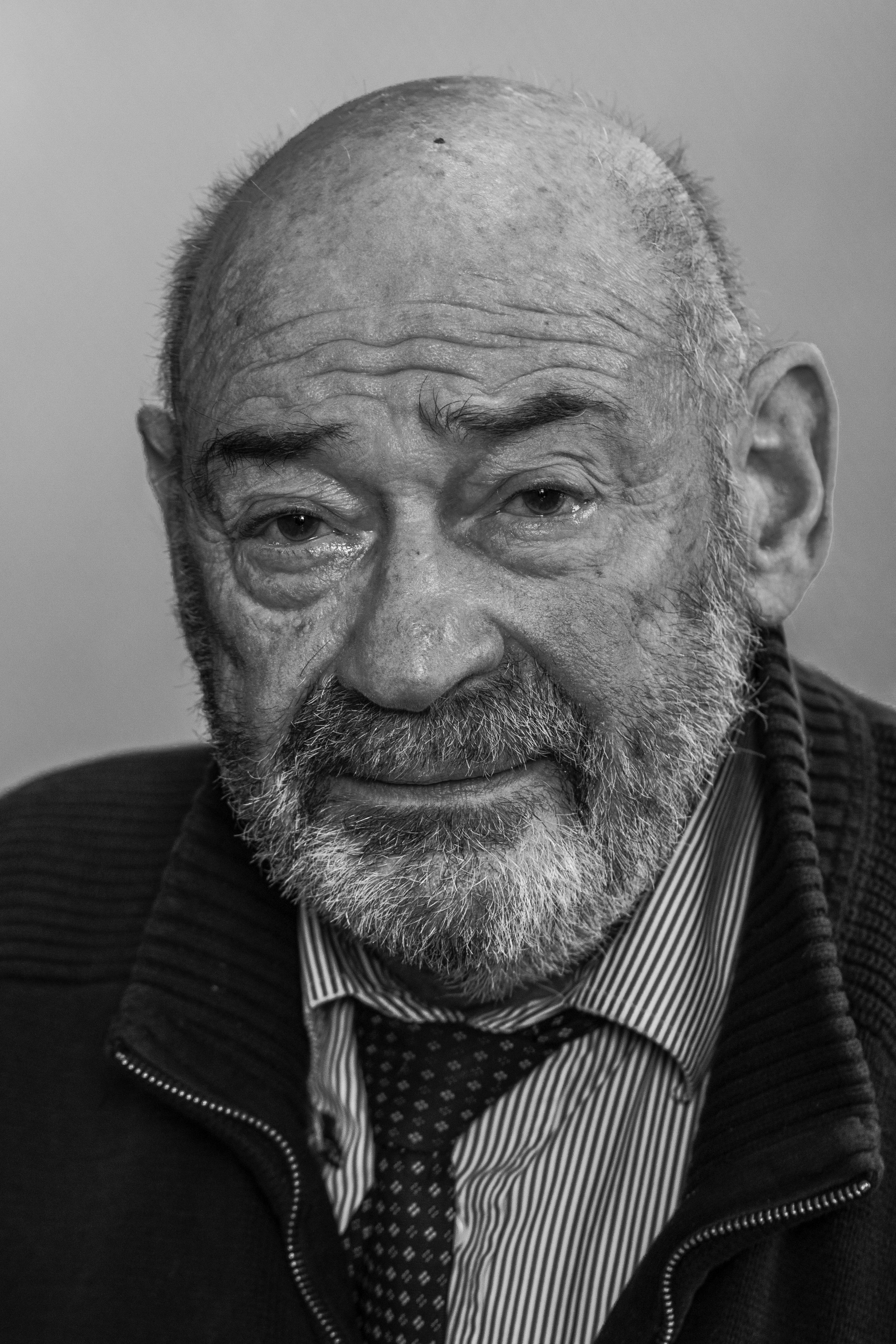
- Known for: Surviving the Holocaust

Joseph Weismann (born 19 June 1931 in Paris), is a French Shoah survivor. He was arrested during the Vel' d'Hiv Roundup and is one of the few children to survive.

His story inspired Roselyne Bosch's film La Rafle (The Roundup). Asked many times what happened to him after the end of the film, he wrote his biography Après la rafle, translated into English by Richard Kutner under the title After the Roundup.

== Awards ==
- Legion of Honour (2004)
- Escapees' Medal (2014)
- Order of Academic Palms (2014)
- Political deportation and internment medal
