= Ralph Erwin =

Austrian composer

- Born: 31 October 1896; Bielitz, Austrian Silesia, Austria-Hungary
- Died: 15 May 1943 (aged 46); Beaune-la-Rolande internment camp, Loiret, France
- Occupation: Composer

Ralph Erwin (31 October 1896 – 15 May 1943), originally Erwin Vogl, was the Austrian-born French composer of a number of film scores.

== Career ==
Erwin Vogl was born in Bielitz, in the part of Silesia which was then part of the Austro-Hungarian Empire. He served in the Austrian Army during the First World War.

After the war, Erwin established himself as a leading German songwriter. He had a great success with I Kiss Your Hand, Madame (German: Ich küsse Ihre Hand, Madame), which featured in the film of the same title of 1929. The song became the signature tune of Richard Tauber. It was prominently used in the 1933 film Baby Face and Bing Crosby also later sang an English version, in The Emperor Waltz (1948)

Erwin was a Jew and, following the Nazi rise to power in 1933, he went into exile in France. There, he continued to work on film scores.

Erwin was still in the country during Nazi Occupation of France and was eventually arrested. He died in the Beaune-la-Rolande internment camp.

== Selected filmography ==
- I Kiss Your Hand, Madame (1929)
- Le Roi des resquilleurs (1930)
- The Little Escapade (1931)
- Checkmate (1931)
- When Love Is Over (1931)
- Amourous Adventure (1932)
- The Importance of Being Earnest (1932)
- Madame Makes Her Exit (1932)
- The Beautiful Adventure (1932)
- You Don't Forget Such a Girl (1932)
- Baby Face (1933)
- Employees Entrance (1933)
- Dinner At Eight (1933)
- A Weak Woman (1933)
- Let's Touch Wood (1933)
- Monsieur Sans-Gêne (1935)
- Widow's Island (1937)
- The Lady from Vittel (1937)
- Storm Over Asia (1938)

== Bibliography ==
- Symonette, Lys & Kowalke, Kim H. Speak Low (When You Speak Love): The Letters of Kurt Weill and Lotte Lenya. University of California Press, 1997.
