= The Round Up (2010 film) =

- French poster
- Directed by: Roselyne Bosch
- Written by: Roselyne Bosch
- Produced by: Alain Goldman
- Starring: Mélanie Laurent; Jean Reno; Sylvie Testud; Gad Elmaleh; Raphaëlle Agogué
- Cinematography: David Ungaro
- Edited by: Plantin Alice
- Music by: Christian Henson
- Distributed by: Gaumont
- Release date: 10 March 2010
- Running time: 115 minutes
- Country: France
- Language: French
- Budget: $21.8 million
- Box office: $25.6 million

The Round Up (French: La Rafle) is a 2010 French historical war drama film written and directed by Roselyne Bosch and produced by Alain Goldman. The film stars Mélanie Laurent, Jean Reno, Sylvie Testud and Gad Elmaleh. Based on the true story of a young Jewish boy, the film depicts the Vel' d'Hiv Roundup (Rafle du Vel' d'Hiv), the mass arrest of Jews by French police who were accomplices of Nazi Germans in Paris in July 1942.

== Plot ==
During the summer of 1942 France is under German occupation, the Jews are obliged to wear the yellow star; In the Butte Montmartre district, two Jewish families live like the other inhabitants of this district, with the exception that, being Jews, they fear the arrival of the Gestapo. In Paris, opinions are divided, some want to protect the Jews by hiding them while others like the baker prefer to insult them, and belittle them.

On the night of July 16 to 17, their destiny changed following an agreement between the Nazis and the French authorities on the arrest and deportation of numerous Jews, an agreement which led to the roundup of the Vélodrome d'Hiver. The Butte Montmartre district will not escape it, indeed the family of Joseph Weismann, a Jew, and their neighbors are arrested after having tried by several means to escape. Joseph's father could have escaped this arrest if Joseph had not inadvertently denounced him when his mother had pretended to be a widow to the militiamen.

Following this raid, they are taken to the Vélodrome d'Hiver, where Joseph and Noé, his best friend's little brother, meet a nurse, Annette Monod, who will do her best to help them and the other Jews. In this velodrome, the conditions are precarious and unsanitary: they have no water, they are crowded and they have to relieve themselves where there is space. The meager food they have taken must be shared so that each of them can eat. One early morning when the prisoners are thirsty, the firefighters burst in and open the valves to give the prisoners something to drink. They also agree to “pass on” the letters entrusted to them. Captain Pierret, of the Paris firefighters, even uses his rank (the highest among all the soldiers present at the Vél' d'Hiv': National Gendarmerie and firefighters of Paris) to take command of the Vél' d'Hiv' in order to impose silence on the gendarmes dissatisfied with his attitude and that of his colleagues.

After two days, those rounded up are deported to a transit camp in Beaune-la-Rolande, in Loiret, where the living conditions are unbearable: bad food and in meager quantities, illnesses, not to mention the psychological despair of the deported. Hungry and weakened, the Jews face hunger and thirst. A few days later, the parents and their children are deported to an extermination camp, in Auschwitz, only the little ones have to stay, hoping for their return, which will not take place. The latter have been torn from their mothers' arms and Annette redoubles her efforts, despite her fatigue, to take care of them.

Following his mother's last words telling him to survive, Joseph and one of his comrades flee with the complicity of others and money their parents hid in the latrines before they were deported. Joseph cannot take his best friend with him because he is ill and has a bad hernia, which prevents him from walking. When a doctor tells Annette about the extermination camps she goes after the train deporting the little ones, but she arrives too late. Finally, Joseph survives thanks to his escape, as well as Nono, who escaped from the train and was taken in by a couple of people. In 1945, at the end of the war, they both find Annette at the Lutetia, a Parisian hotel where survivors of the camps are welcomed.

== Cast ==
- Mélanie Laurent as Protestant nurse Annette Monod (d. 1995)
- Gad Elmaleh as Schmuel Weismann
- Jean Reno as Dr. David Sheinbaum
- Raphaëlle Agogué as Sura Weismann
- Rebecca Marder as Rachel Weismann
- Denis Menochet as Corot
- Sylvie Testud as Bella Zygler
- Adèle Exarchopoulos as Anna Traube (aged 20)
- Catherine Allegret as the concierge Tati
- Isabelle Gélinas as Hélène Timonier
- Hugo Leverdez as young Jo Weismann (aged 11)
- the real Joseph Weismann (then aged 80) as the old man
- Oliver Cywie as Simon Zygler
- Mathieu and Romain Di Concetto as Noé Zygler
- Anne Brochet as Dina Traube
- Barnabás Réti as Monsieur Goldstein
- Thierry Frémont as Capitaine Pierret, fire chief
- Catherine Hosmalin as The baker
- Anne Benoît as Matthey Jouanis
- Iván Fenyő as Gradé allemand Müller
- Armelle as School Nurses's Director
- Udo Schenk as Adolf Hitler
- Thomas Darchinger as Heinrich Himmler
- Holger Daemgen as Helmut Knochen
- Roland Copé as Marshal Philippe Pétain
- Jean-Michel Noirey as Prime Minister Pierre Laval
- Frederic Moulin as Laval's deputy, René Bousquet
- Patrick Courtois as Emile Hennequin, Paris chief of police
- Christelle Cornil as Jacqueline
- Swann Arlaud as Weismann

== Music ==
- "Clair de lune" from Claude Debussy.
- "Valse N°17" from Frédéric Chopin.
- "Paris" from Edith Piaf.
- "Tombé du ciel" from Charles Trénet.
- "Insensiblement", and "Quand un Vicomte", from Ray Ventura.
- "Tout en flanant" from André Claveau.
- "La Savane" from Louis Moreau Gottschalk.
- "Concerto de L'adieu" from Georges Delerue.
- "Concerto pour Violon", from Philip Glass.

== Production ==
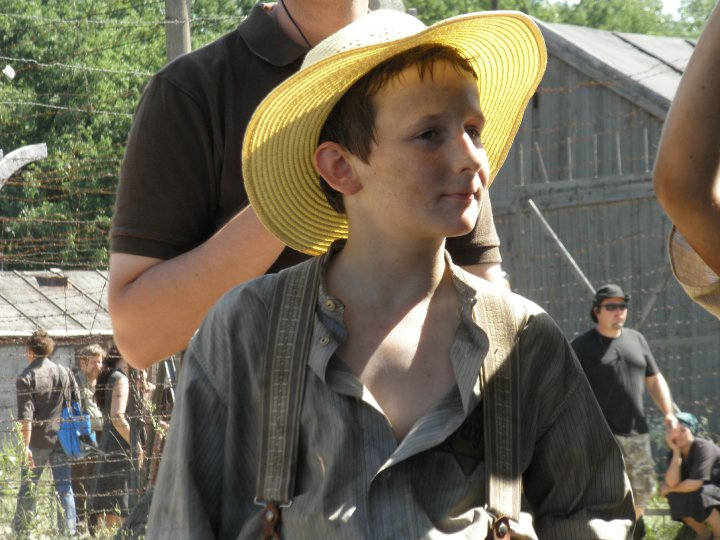
Oliver Cywie on the set of The Round Up

Roselyne Bosch first decided to make a film of the events surrounding the rafle du Vel' d'Hiv because she felt sympathy with the victims. Her husband's family is Jewish and lived in Montmartre near where the Weismann family lived. Her father had been detained in one of Francisco Franco's internment camps, so she felt a connection with the subject matter. She began extensively researching the events surrounding the round up and discovered survivor Joseph Weismann and Annette Monod whose memories would eventually form the base of the script. Bosch decided to portray only real life characters in the film and cast Gad Elmaleh in the role of Joseph's father, Schmuel Weismann. Initially, Elmaleh was hesitant to accept a serious dramatic role, but after reading the script he agreed to play the role. Actress Mélanie Laurent was cast in the role of the Red Cross worker Annette Monod, whose actions were noble and undisputed, before, during, and after the round up. Bosch's husband Alain Goldman produced the film.

Shooting began in May 2009 and lasted for 13 weeks. 9,000 extras were used and facsimiles of the Vélodrome d'hiver and a concentration camp were reconstructed in Hungary for the film.

== Release ==
The French premiere took place on 10 March 2010. The film also opened in Belgium, Luxembourg and Switzerland on the same day.

=== Box office ===
The Round Up opened in first place in its opening weekend, ranking ahead of Shutter Island at the French box office. In France, it did three million admissions, topping other films on the Holocaust, such as "The Pianist" and "Schindler's List". It then gathered another 7 million viewers on free TV for its first run, becoming the number one French film of the year and appearing in the TF1 polls as the "favorite" film of the audience that year. The DVD remained three weeks in a row at the top of the box office in 2011.

=== Home media ===
The DVD of The Round Up was released in France on 7 September 2010. It was released on the American iTunes Store on May 14, 2013.

== Critical reception ==
The film received positive reviews from critics.

- Weekly magazine Nouvel Observateur (François Forestier, « La Rafle » [archive], Nouvelobs.com, 2011) says The Round Up is "a courageous film (...), with an extraordinary emotional quality: it is impossible to remain insensitive watching this shameful story. This film honors the French cinema".
- Figaroscope (Le Figaro, Top 10 du cinéma, 19 March 2010): 'The director films through the children's eyes ( ... ). Her delicate and meticulous fresco is moving without excess".
- Journal du Dimanche (Carlos Gomez): "The emotion goes crescendo, without ostentation and steadily, with dignity".
- Paris Match (Alain Spira): "The stars in the film are the children, in all their overwhelming authenticity. To film this tragedy, Rose Bosch is both at a reasonable distance, but gives to her film incredible intensity".
- Ouest France: "Impressive, spectacular and gripping." Jean Reno, Sylvie Testud and Melanie Laurent give performances with a sincerity dictated by the subject itself".
- L'Express (Emmanuelle Cirodde): "Both 'Schindler's List' and 'The Pianist' were describing lonesome characters. Rose Bosch chooses to describe ordinary people, particularly children".

Other media are less enthusiastic, such as:

- Telerama, addressing the question: "Can horror be described?"
- On the first French Cinema website, "Allo Ciné" analyzes critics this way: 36% give "5 stars out of 5", 28% allow 4/5 and 7% give no star at all.
- In the U.S., Variety ([archive], variety.com, 11 March 2010), says "With impeccable production values and all-around stirring performances, pic emphasizes the unbearable emotions caused by "events, even the most extreme, that actually happened, though it often oversimplifies them into a framework of good vs. evil". Following wide local release March 10, this €20 million ($27 million) co-production should round up ample worldwide biz."
- In England, The Guardian (Peter Bradshaw, 2010) says the film is "A straightforward, heartfelt drama about the occupation of France by Nazi Germany".

== Controversy ==
In an interview for the French magazine Les années laser in September 2010, Roselyne Bosch compared people who do not cry at the film to "spoiled children", or cynics who "consider human emotions as an abomination or a weakness", just "like Hitler did". Her remarks were strongly criticized by several French media, and by the cinema website Selenie who accused her of "saying one of the silliest thing[s] of the last few years". Roselyne Bosch sued the website for publicly insulting her, but her case was dismissed in April 2013, the Paris Court judging that the critic did not exceed the boundaries of freedom of expression.
