= Zber =

Polish Jewish artist (1909–1942)

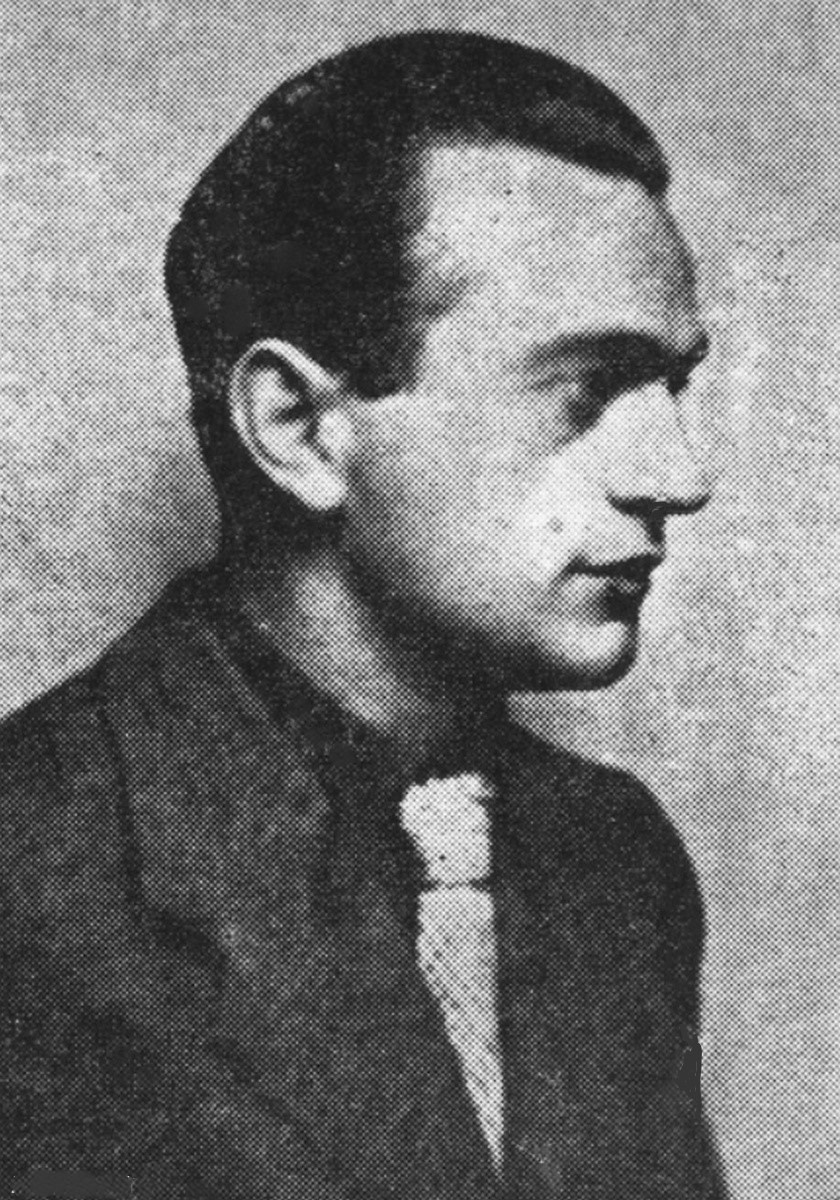
- Zber
- Born: Fiszel Zylberberg; 23 June 1909; Płock, Congress Poland, Russian Empire
- Died: 26 October 1942 (aged 33); Auschwitz-Birkenau, German-occupied Poland
- Education: Warsaw Academy of Arts, Wladyslaw Skoczylas
- Known for: Xylography, painting, drawing, sculpting, graphic arts
- Spouse: Stenia Bonder

Fiszel Zylberberg, most commonly known as Zber (23 June 1909 – 26 October 1942) was a Jewish artist, best known for his work in wood-engraving. Zber was said to be a young artist who was a genius of the graphic arts, his style was described as having a "lyricism drawn from life itself." His pieces are now held in the Israel Museum in Jerusalem, the Tel-Aviv Museum, the Museum of Modern art in Haifa, the Bibliothèque Nationale in Paris, and in many other art museums.

Described as a ‘poet of his generation’, Zber's artwork included nature, and workers doing their trade. His artwork was viewed as authentic and true to reality.

Zber's career was quickly accelerating and he was becoming increasingly renowned as a young protégée, when the Nazis invaded France in 1940. Zber was captured while working in Paris and was sent to the Auschwitz extermination camp, where he was murdered. Although his career was short-lived, Zber's artwork left an indelible mark that speaks to the life and conditions of early 20th-century Europe, with great historical relevance.

Although most of his creations were destroyed by the Nazis, 39 of his woodcuts (plates) were found after the liberation of Paris, and are now housed in the Safed Museum of the Printing Art in Israel. An album of Zber's surviving woodcuts was published in 1971. In 2007, the Musée d'Art et d'Histoire du Judaïsme in Paris exhibited a collection of Zber's oil paintings that he completed while in the French internment camp Beaune-la-Rolande.

== Early life ==
Zber was born in Płock (Plotzk), a small town in Poland, on June 23, 1909. He grew up in a traditional Jewish home with three siblings - two brothers and a sister - and his two parents. Zber's mother, Hina, was a homemaker who focused on raising her children. They owned a small local grocery store, which was the source of their income. Wolf, Zber's father, was elected parnas (religious and civic leader) for the community of Płock.

Zber's childhood was spent at the village Jewish elementary school and at Heder (school). During his time at Heder, Zber learned religious studies and he became more attuned to his Jewish identity. His creative talents surfaced as a young boy while he was in elementary school, where he enjoyed drawing in pencil and crayon. In school, Zber's first sculptural exhibit was a Greek head that he sculpted from a picture. Zber's teacher was the first to discover his artistic brilliance and the school principal, who was an artist herself, encouraged him to hone his natural talent and make an effort to continue in the artistic field. At school painting competitions, Zber was rewarded with the first prize, and his displays received much praise.

At the age of 16, Zber moved to Warsaw with the intention of actively pursuing his artistic career. This was made possible by the financial support Zber received from the Jewish intellectuals in his hometown who believed in his artistic endeavors. There, as a way of earning income, Zber worked during the day at a picture postcard factory, and took private drawing lessons during his free time at night. This period of his life lasted for five years as preparation for attending the Warsaw Academy of Arts, where he was finally admitted in 1930. Zber studied drawing, painting and the techniques of printed graphic art. During this period of study, Zber discovered his love for wood engraving, and he entered the graphic arts studio under Wladyslaw Skoczylas. Skoczylas was a Polish artist born in Warsaw, who won the bronze medal for his series of artwork in the Olympic Games art competitions.

== Career ==
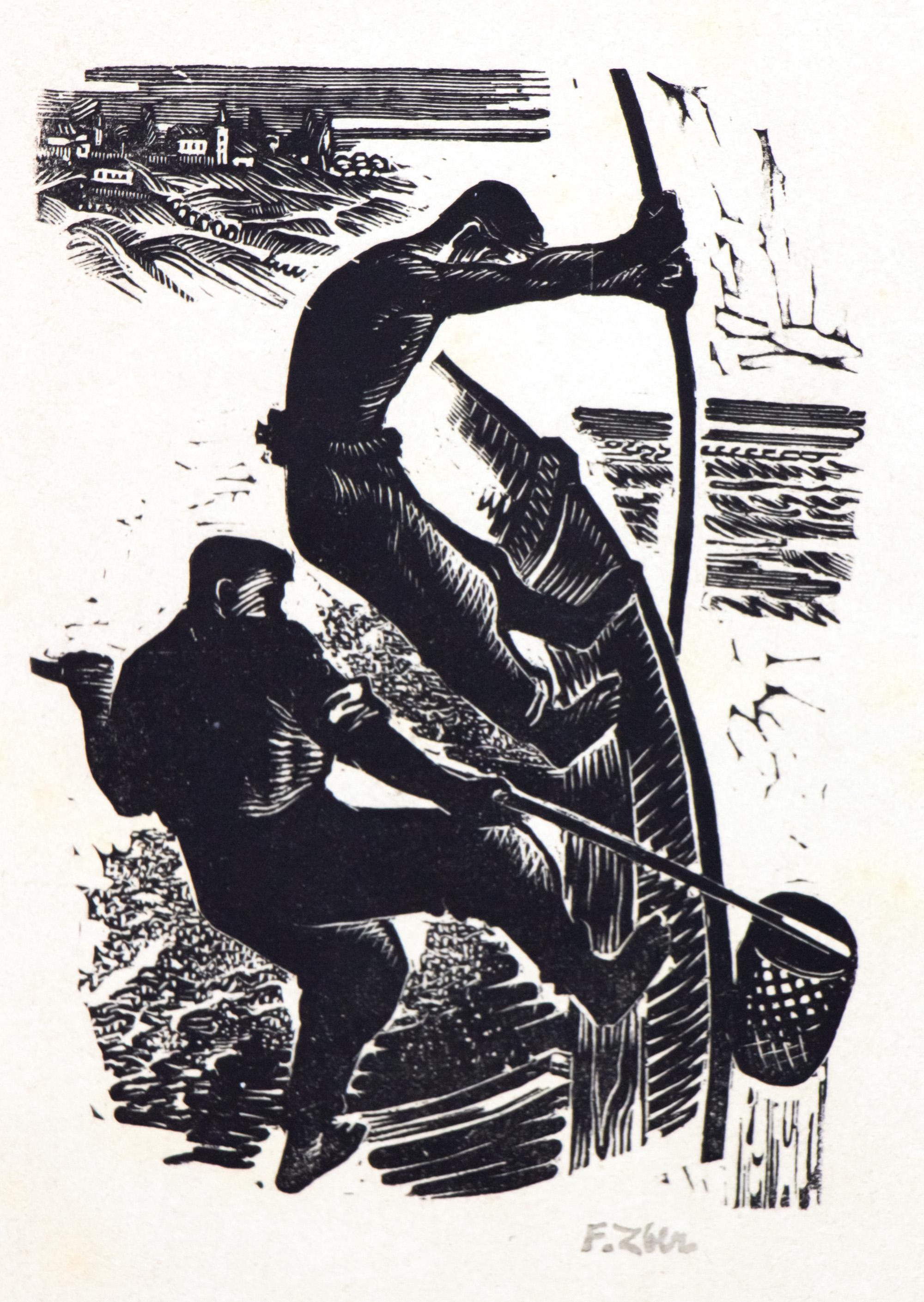
Woodcut of fishermen by Zber

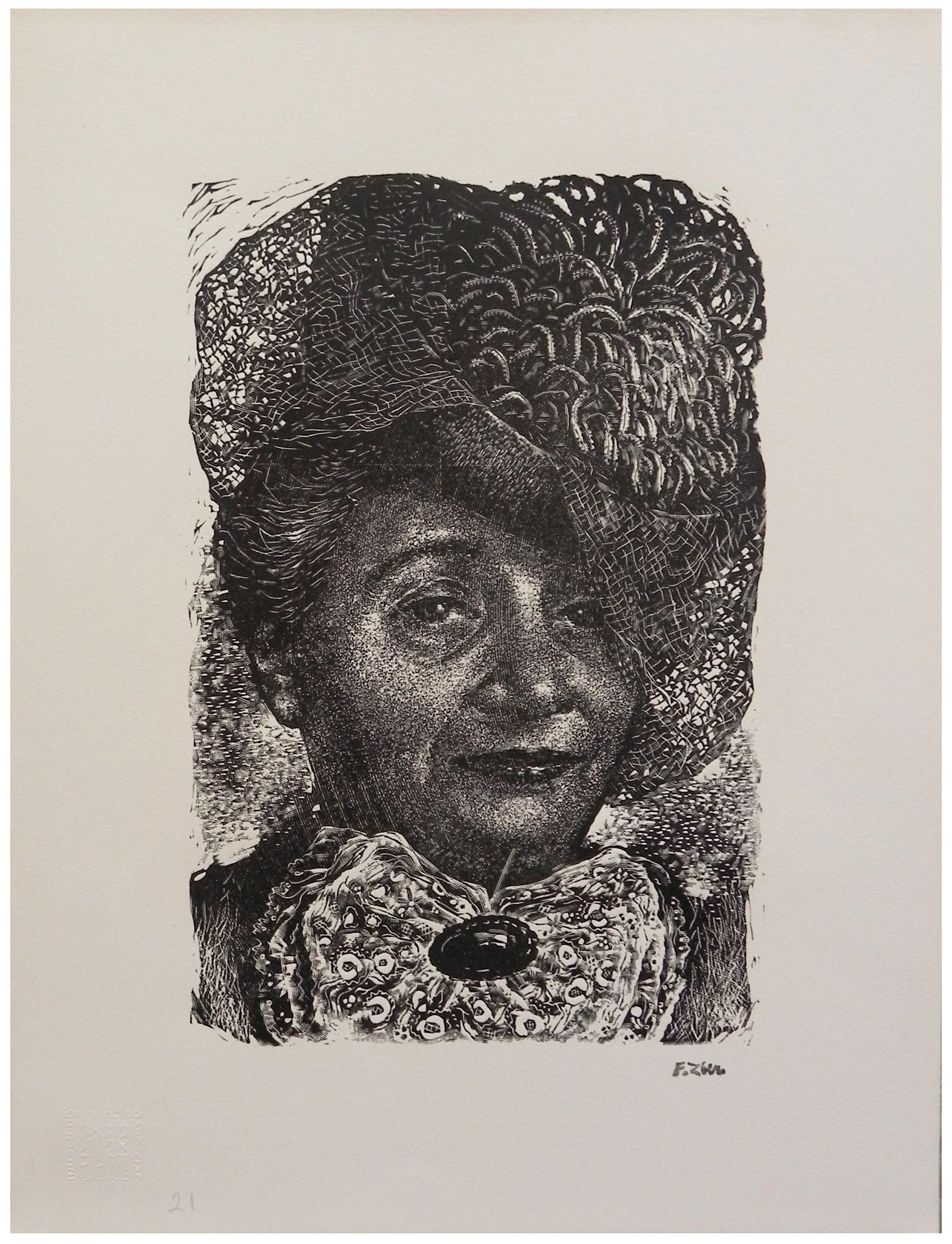
Woodcut of a lady by Zber, 1930s

Zber's professional career beyond his studies began in 1936, at the age of 27, where his art was first exhibited at the ‘Black and White’ exhibition displayed in the ‘Zachenta’ Polish Artists’ Gallery in Warsaw. Twenty-two of the exhibits in this exhibition were Zber's pieces. The public's response to his work was tremendous and the Polish government awarded him an eight-month scholarship to study in Paris. In the same year, Zber created his own portfolio of artwork and presented himself to the well-known Jewish art critic, Chil Aronson. The critic was impressed with Zber's work and gave him much praise as a xylography protégée. Despite the difficult conditions in Paris, Zber continued living there, working for French journals. A year after his debut in Warsaw, Zber displayed his engravings of Jewish figures from his hometown, Płock, at the Paris World's Fair in 1937. From that year on, his work was regularly displayed around Paris, in salons and large annual art exhibitions. He was praised by high-ranking Parisian critics, and graphic arts experts wrote admiringly of him as a masterly young artist with a genius for wood engraving.

The extent to which Zber embraced Paris as his new home is evident through the artwork that emerged from this period of his life. He was deeply inspired by the scenes and environments he was exposed to. In 1938, after coming into contact with the enlightened Jewry of the Baltic countries, thirty-five of his pieces were exhibited in an exhibition entitled ‘Jewish Graphic Art’. The exhibition was received by the principal towns of all the Baltic countries as well as Eastern Europe. The last exhibition of his career was the display of his prints by the publishing firm of the Rue des Beaux Arts, followed by having his work published in a limited edition album, submitted to the Bibliothèque Nationale.

== Holocaust ==
Zber's successful but short career was to put to a halt in 1940 when Nazi Germany overtook Paris. Zber fled Paris in late May 1940 with a group of about ten Polish friends including his fellow artists and art school friends Ilya Schor and Resia Schor but then decided to return to be with Stenia Bonder. Of that group, only the Schors survived the Shoah. Zber married Stenia Bonder, who fought in the anti-Nazi underground movement in France. On May 14, 1941, Zber was arrested and sent, with 5,000 other Jews, to the French internment concentration camp of Beaune-La-Rolande. Even under these conditions he continued to pursue his artwork, such that, a recent exhibition in the Musee d’Art et d’Histoire du Judaisme included portraits painted by Zber while he was imprisoned there. He was in this concentration camp for over a year, until the 16th of July 1942, when he was transferred to the Pithiviers camp, and the next day to the Auschwitz extermination camp.
