= Vel' d'Hiv roundup =

1942 mass arrest and deportation of Jews in Paris

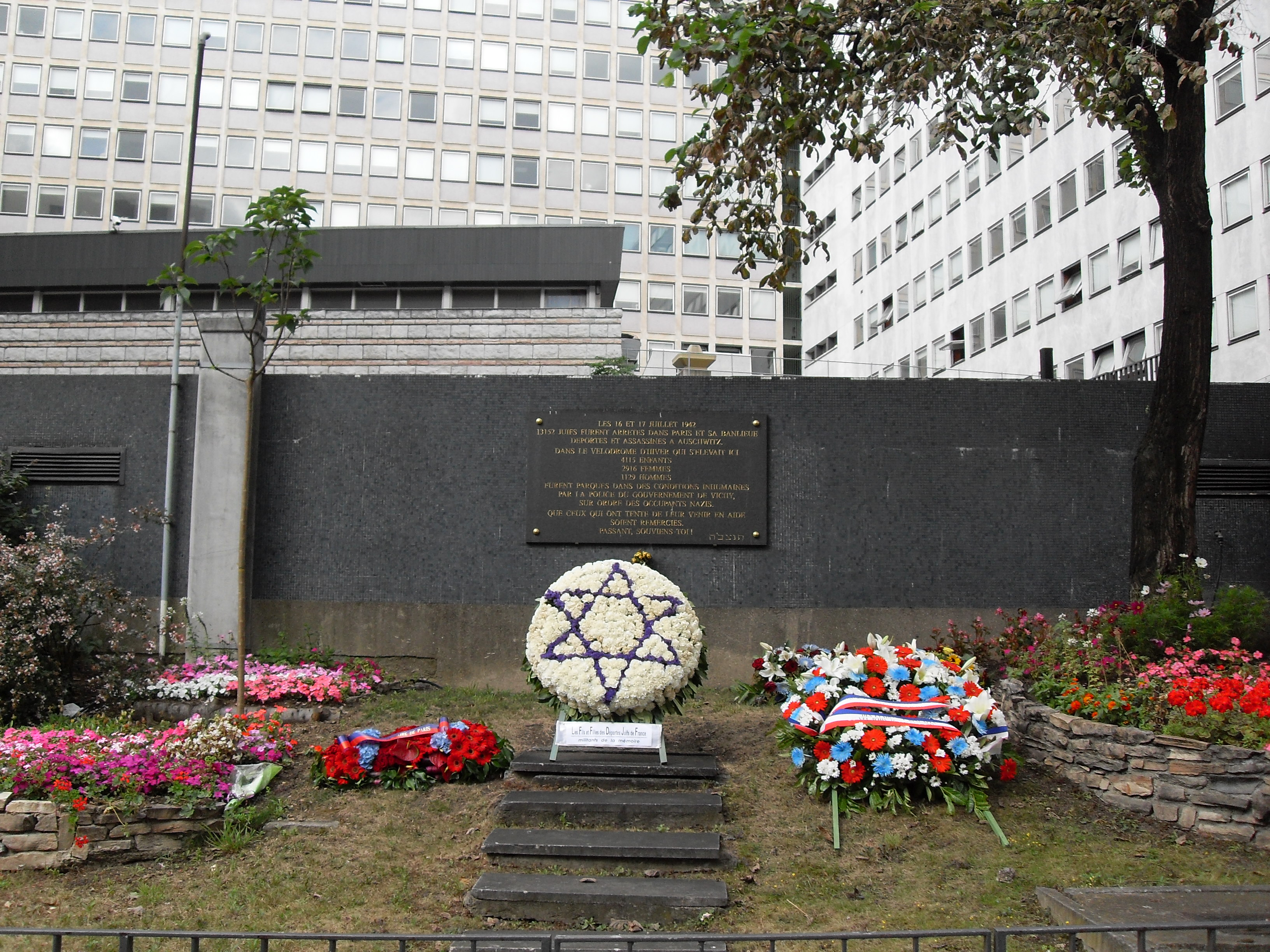
- Memorial garden at the former Vel d'Hiv location
- Native name: Rafle du Vélodrome d'Hiver
- English name: Vel' d'Hiv' Roundup
- Date: 16–17 July 1942
- Location: Paris
- Organised by: Nazi Germany; Vichy France
- Participants: 7,000–9,000 French police and Gendarmerie
- Arrests: 13,152 people: 4,115 children; 5,919 women; 3,118 men

The Vel' d'Hiv' roundup ( [vel ˈdiv] vell-DEEV; from French: la rafle du Vel' d'Hiv', an abbreviation of la rafle du Vélodrome d'Hiver) was a mass arrest of Jews in Paris on 16–17 July 1942 by Vichy French police at the behest of the German occupational authorities. Occurring during World War II, Jews arrested during the roundup were deported to Nazi Germany and targeted for extermination as part of the Holocaust. It was one of several measures aimed at eradicating French Jews in both the area of France under direct German occupation and the so-called "zone libre" that took place in 1942 as part of Opération Vent printanier (Operation Spring Wind). Planned by René Bousquet, Louis Darquier de Pellepoix, Theodor Dannecker and Helmut Knochen, the roundup was the largest deportation of Jews from France.

According to Paris Police Prefecture records, 13,152 Jews were arrested, including 4,115 children. They were confined in the Vélodrome d'Hiver, an indoor sports arena, in extremely crowded conditions without any arrangements made for food, water or sanitary facilities. In the week following the arrests, arrested Jews were taken to the Drancy, Pithiviers and Beaune-la-Rolande internment camps before being deported in cattle cars to Nazi concentration camps, primarily Auschwitz.

In the view of President Charles de Gaulle's administration and the successive French governments, France could not be held accountable for the roundup since the Vichy state was "both illegal and illegitimate". President François Mitterrand refused to acknowledge the responsibility of the French state, stating that "Vichy was not the Republic". Only in 1995, in contrast with the silence of his predecessors, did President Jacques Chirac apologise for the role of French police and civil servants in the roundup, calling it "the darkest hours that will forever tarnish our history". In 2017, President Emmanuel Macron more specifically admitted the responsibility of the French state in the roundup and hence in the Holocaust in France.

== Background ==
The Vélodrome d'Hiver was a large indoor sports arena at the corner of the boulevard de Grenelle and rue Nélaton in the 15th arrondissement of Paris, not far from the Eiffel Tower. It was built by Henri Desgrange, editor of L'Auto, who later organised the Tour de France, as a velodrome (cycle track) when his original track in the nearby Salle des Machines was listed for demolition in 1909 to improve the view of the Eiffel Tower. As well as track cycling, the new building was used for ice hockey, wrestling, boxing, roller-skating, circuses, spectacles and demonstrations. In the 1924 Summer Olympics, several events were held there, including foil fencing, boxing, cycling (track), weightlifting, and wrestling.

The Vel d'Hiv was also the site of political rallies and demonstrations, including a large event attended by Xavier Vallat, Philippe Henriot, Leon Daudet and other notable antisemites when Charles Maurras was released from prison. In 1939 Jewish refugees were interned there before being sent to camps in the Paris region and in 1940 it was used as an internment center for foreign women, an event that served as a precedent for its selection as internment location.

The "Vel' d'Hiv' Roundup" was not the first roundup of this sort in France during World War II. In what is known as the green ticket roundup (French: rafle du billet vert), 3,747 Jewish men were arrested on 14 May 1941, after 6,694 foreign Jews living in France received a summons in the mail (delivered on a green ticket) to a status review (French: examen de situation). The summons was a trap: those who honoured their summons were arrested and taken by bus the same day to the Gare d'Austerlitz, then shipped in four special trains to two camps at Pithiviers and Beaune-La-Rolande in the Loiret department. Women, children, and more men followed in July 1942.

The Vel' d'Hiv' Roundup, as part of the "Final Solution", was a continent-wide plan to intern and exterminate Europe's Jewish population. It was a joint operation between German and collaborating French administrators. The first anti-Jewish ordinance of 27 September 1940, promulgated by the German authorities, forced Jewish people in the Occupied Zone, including foreigners, to register at police stations or at sous-préfectures ("sub-prefectures"). Nearly 150,000 people registered in the department of the Seine that encompasses Paris and its immediate suburbs. Their names and addresses were kept by the French police in the fichier Tulard, a file named after its creator, André Tulard. Theodor Dannecker, the SS captain who headed the German police in France, said: "This filing system subdivided into files sorted alphabetically; Jews with French nationality and foreign Jews had files of different colors, and the files were also sorted, according to profession, nationality and street." These files were then given to the Gestapo, in charge of the "Jewish problem." At the request of the German authorities, the Vichy government created in March 1941 the Commissariat Général aux Questions Juives or CGQJ (Commissariat-General for Jewish Affairs) with the task of implementing antisemitic policies.

On 4 July 1942 René Bousquet, secretary-general of the national police, and Louis Darquier de Pellepoix, who had replaced Xavier Vallat in May 1942 as head of the CGQJ, travelled to Gestapo headquarters at 93 rue Lauriston in the 16th arrondissement of Paris to meet Dannecker and Helmut Knochen of the SS. The previous roundups had come short of the 32,000 Jews promised by the French authorities to the Germans. Darquier proposed the arrest of stateless Jews in the Southern Zone and the denaturalization of all Jews who acquired French citizenship since 1927. A further meeting took place in Dannecker's office on the avenue Foch on 7 July. Also present were Jean Leguay, Bousquet's deputy, Jean François, who was director of the police administration at the Paris prefecture, Émile Hennequin, head of Paris police, and André Tulard.

Dannecker met Adolf Eichmann on 10 July 1942. Another meeting took place the same day at the CGQJ, attended by Dannecker, Heinz Röthke, Ernst Heinrichsohn, Jean Leguay, Gallien, deputy to Darquier de Pellepoix, several police officials and representatives of the French railway service, the SNCF. The roundup was delayed until after Bastille Day on 14 July at the request of the French. This national holiday was not celebrated in the occupied zone, and they wished to avoid civil uprisings. Dannecker declared: "The French police, despite a few considerations of pure form, have only to carry out orders!"

The roundup was aimed at Jews from Germany, Austria, Poland, Czechoslovakia, the Soviet Union and the apatrides ("stateless"), whose origin couldn't be determined, aged from 16 to 50. There were to be exceptions for women "in advanced state of pregnancy" or who were breast-feeding, but "to save time, the sorting will be made not at home but at the first assembly centre".

The Germans planned for the French police to arrest 22,000 Jews in Greater Paris. They would then be taken to internment camps at Drancy, Compiègne, Pithiviers and Beaune-la-Rolande. André Tulard "will obtain from the head of the municipal police the files of Jews to be arrested. Children of less than 15 or 16 years will be sent to the Union générale des israélites de France (UGIF, General Union of French Jews), which will place them in foundations. The sorting of children will be done in the first assembly centres."

== Police complicity ==
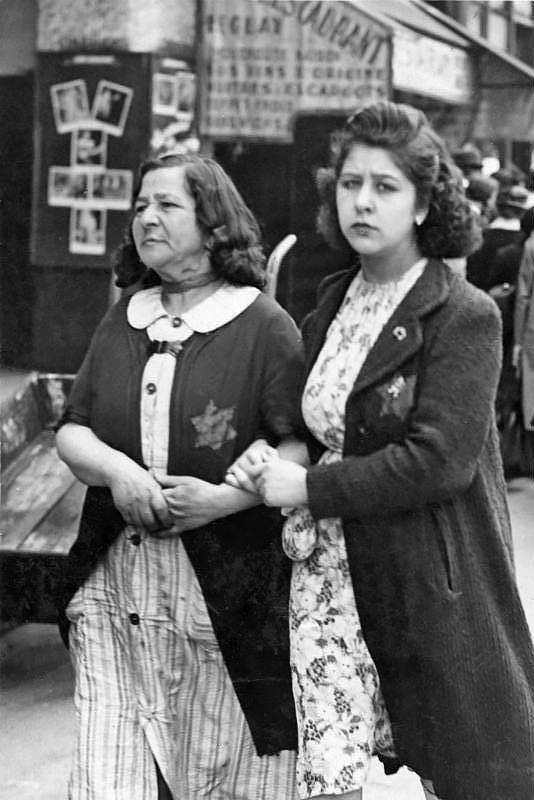
Two Jewish women in occupied Paris wearing the yellow Star of David badge in June 1942, a few weeks before the mass arrest

The position of the French police was complicated by the sovereignty of the Vichy government, which nominally administered France while accepting occupation of the north. Although in practice the Germans ran the north, the formal position was that France and the Germans were separate. The position of Vichy and its leader, Marshal Henri Philippe Pétain, was recognised throughout the war by many foreign governments.

This independence had to be preserved. German interference in internal policing, says the historian Julian T. Jackson, "would further erode that sovereignty which Vichy was so committed to preserving. This could only be avoided by reassuring Germany that the French would carry out the necessary measures." Jackson adds that the decision to arrest Jews and Communists and Gaullists was "an autonomous policy, with its own indigenous roots." In other words, the decision to do so was not forced upon the Vichy regime by the Germans. Jackson also explains that the roundup of Jews must have been run by the French, since the Germans would not have had the necessary information or manpower to find and arrest as many as 13,000 people.

On 2 July 1942, René Bousquet attended a planning meeting in which he raised no objection to the arrests, and worried only about the gênant ("embarrassing") fact that the French police would carry them out. Bousquet succeeded in reaching a compromise – that the police would round up only foreign Jews. Vichy ratified that agreement the following day.

Although the police have been blamed for rounding up children younger than 16—the age was set to preserve a fiction that workers were needed in the east—the order to do so was given by Vichy's Prime Minister, Pierre Laval, supposedly as a "humanitarian" measure to keep families together. This too was a fiction, given that the parents of these children had already been deported; documents of the period have revealed that the anti-Semitic Laval's principal concern was what to do with Jewish children once their parents had been deported. The youngest child sent to Auschwitz under Laval's orders was 18 months old.

Three former SS officers testified in 1980 that Vichy officials had been enthusiastic about deportation of Jews from France. Investigator Serge Klarsfeld found minutes in German archives of meetings with senior Vichy officials and Bousquet's proposal that the roundup should cover non-French Jews throughout the country. In 1990, charges of crimes against humanity were laid against Bousquet in relation to his role in the Vel' d'Hiv' roundup of Jews, based on complaints filed by Klarsfeld.

The historians Antony Beevor and Artemis Cooper record:

Klarsfeld also revealed the telegrams Bousquet had sent to Prefects of départements in the occupied zone, ordering them to deport not only Jewish adults but children whose deportation had not even been requested by the Nazis.

== Roundup ==
Émile Hennequin, director of the city police, ordered on 12 July 1942 that "the operations must be effected with the maximum speed, without pointless speaking and without comment."

Beginning at 4:00 a.m. on 16 July 1942, French police numbering 9,000 started the manhunt. The Police force included gendarmes, gardes mobiles, detectives, patrolmen and cadets; they were divided into arresting teams of three or four men each, fanning across the city. A few hundred followers of Jacques Doriot volunteered to help, wearing armband with the colours of the fascist French Popular Party (PPF).

In total 13,152 Jews were arrested. According to records of the Paris Préfecture de police, 5,802 (44%) of these were women and 4,051 (31%) were children. An unknown number of people managed to escape, warned by a clandestine Jewish newspaper or the French Resistance, hidden by neighbors or benefiting from the lack of zeal or thoroughness of some policemen. Baggage restrictions for the arrested were harsh: they could take only a blanket, a sweater, a pair of shoes and two shirts. Most families were split up and never reunited.

Some of those captured were taken by bus to an internment camp in an unfinished complex of apartments and apartment towers in the northern suburb of Drancy, the rest were taken to the Vélodrome d'Hiver which had already been used as an internment center in the summer of 1941.

== Vel' d'Hiv' ==
The Vel' d'Hiv' was available for hire to whoever wanted it. Among those who had booked it was Jacques Doriot, who led France's largest fascist party, the Parti Populaire Français (PPF). It was at the Vel' d'Hiv' among other venues that Doriot, with his Hitler-like salute, roused crowds to join his cause. Among those who helped in the Rafle du Vel' d'hiv' were 3,400 young members of Doriot's PPF.

The Germans demanded the keys of the Vel' d'Hiv' from its owner, Jacques Goddet, who had taken over from his father Victor and Henri Desgrange. The circumstances in which Goddet surrendered the keys remain a mystery and the episode is given only a few lines in his autobiography.

The Vel' d'Hiv' had a glass roof, which had been painted dark blue to avoid attracting bomber navigators. The dark glass increased the heat, as did the fact that windows were screwed shut for security. The numbers held there vary from one account to another, but one established figure is 7,500 of a final figure of 13,152. There were no lavatories: of the 10 available, five were sealed because their windows offered a way out, and the others were blocked. The arrested Jews were kept there with only food and water brought by Quakers. The Red Cross and a few doctors and nurses were allowed to enter. There was only one water faucet. Those who tried to escape were shot on the spot. Some took their own lives.

After five days, the prisoners were taken to the internment camps of Drancy, Beaune-la-Rolande and Pithiviers, and later to the extermination camps.

== After the roundup ==
Roundups were conducted in both the northern and southern zones of France, but public outrage was greatest in Paris because of the numbers involved in a concentrated area. The Vel' d'Hiv' was a landmark in the city centre. The Roman Catholic church was among the protesters. Public reaction obliged Laval to ask the Germans on 2 September not to demand more Jews. Handing them over, he said, was not like buying items in a discount store. Laval managed to limit deportations mainly to foreign Jews; he and his defenders argued after the war that allowing the French police to conduct the roundup had been a bargain to ensure the life of Jews of French nationality.

In reality, "Vichy shed no tears over the fate of the foreign Jews in France, who were seen as a nuisance, 'déchets' ("garbage") in Laval's words. Laval told an American diplomat that he was "happy" to get rid of them.

When a Protestant leader accused Laval of murdering Jews, Laval insisted they had been sent to build an agricultural colony in the East. "I talked to him about murder, he answered me with gardening."

== Drancy camp and deportation ==
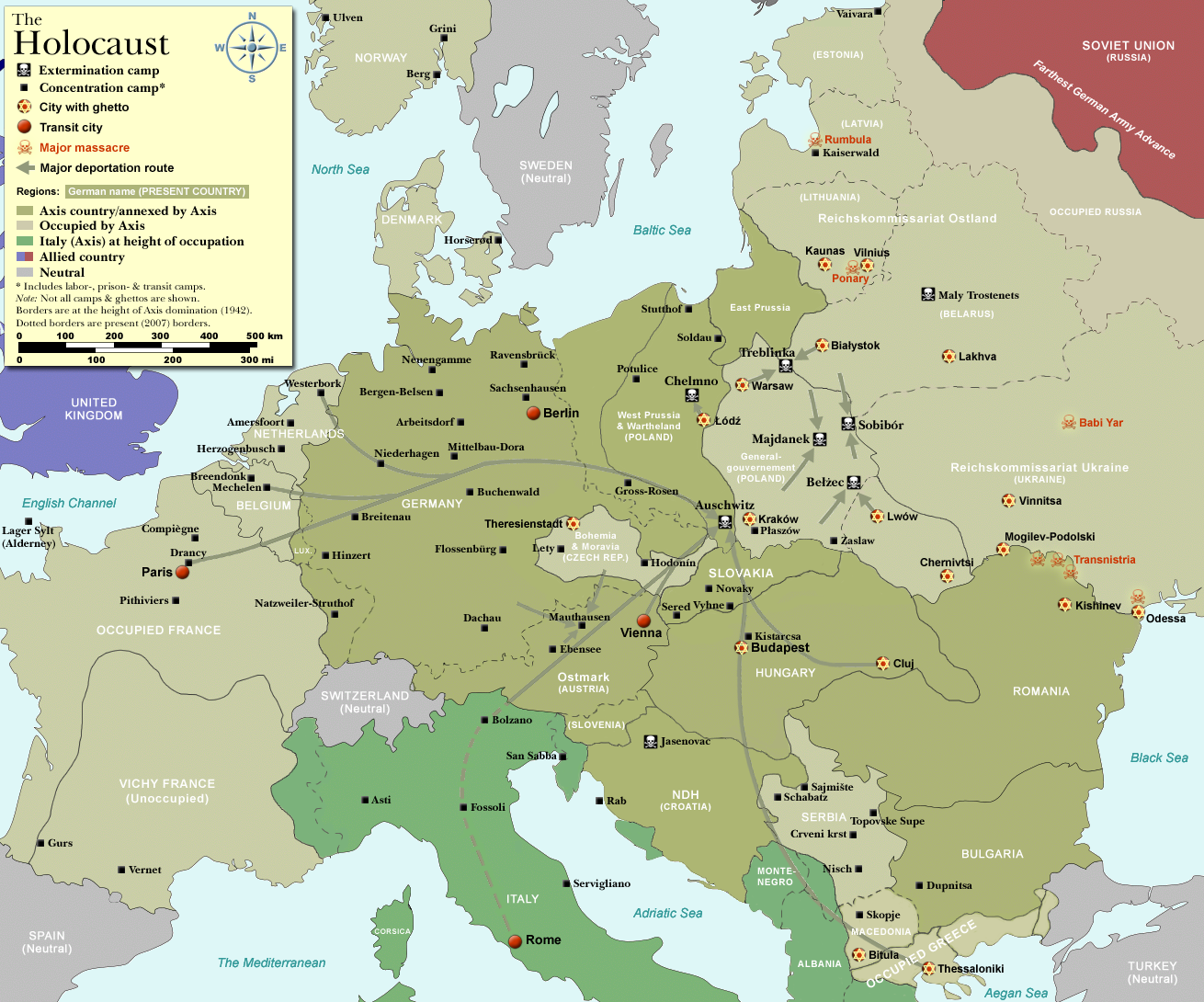
The deportation route from Paris to Auschwitz

The internment camp at Drancy was easily defended because it was built of tower blocks in the shape of a horseshoe. It was guarded by French gendarmes. The camp's operation was under the Gestapo's section of Jewish affairs. Theodor Dannecker, a key figure both in the roundup and in the operation of Drancy, was described by Maurice Rajsfus in his history of the camp as "a violent psychopath. ... It was he who ordered the internees to starve, who banned them from moving about within the camp, to smoke, to play cards, etc."

In December 1941, forty prisoners from Drancy were murdered in retaliation for a French attack on German police officers.

Immediate control of the camp was under Heinz Röthke. It was under his direction from August 1942 to June 1943 that almost two thirds of those deported in SNCF box car transports requisitioned by the Nazis from Drancy were sent to Auschwitz. Drancy is also where the Jewish children captured in a raid of a children's home in Izieu were sent before being shipped to Auschwitz, where they were murdered. Most of the initial victims, including those from the Vel' d'Hiv', were crammed into sealed wagons and died en route from lack of food and water. Those who survived the passage were murdered in the gas chambers.

At the Liberation of Paris in August 1944, the camp was run by the Resistance—"to the frustration of the authorities; the Prefect of Police had no control at all and visitors were not welcome"—who used it to house not Jews, but those it considered collaborators with the Germans. When a pastor was allowed in on 15 September, he discovered cells measuring 3.5 metres (11 ft) by 1.75 metres (5.7 ft) that had held six Jewish internees with two mattresses between them. The prison returned to the conventional prison service on 20 September.

== Aftermath ==
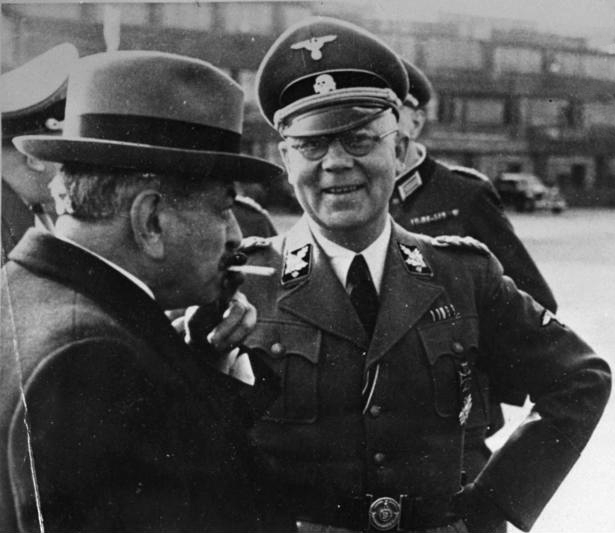
Pierre Laval with the head of German police units in France, Carl Oberg

The roundup accounted for more than a quarter of the 42,000 Jews sent from France to Auschwitz in 1942, of whom only 811 returned to France at the end of the war. With the exception of six adolescents, none of the 3,900 children detained at the Vel d’Hiv and then deported survived.

Pierre Laval's trial opened on 3 October 1945. His first defence was that he had been obliged to sacrifice foreign Jews to save the French. Uproar broke out in the court, with supposedly neutral jurors shouting abuse at Laval, threatening "a dozen bullets in his hide". It was, said historians Antony Beevor and Artemis Cooper, "a cross between an auto-da-fé and a tribunal during the Paris Terror". From 6 October, Laval refused to take part in the proceedings, hoping that the jurors' interventions would lead to a new trial. Laval was sentenced to death, and tried to commit suicide by swallowing a cyanide capsule. Revived by doctors, he was executed by a firing squad at Fresnes Prison on 15 October.

Jean Leguay survived the war and its aftermath and became president of Warner Lambert, Inc. in London (now merged with Pfizer), and later president of Substantia Laboratories in Paris. In 1979, he was charged for his role in the roundup.

Louis Darquier was sentenced to death in absentia in 1947 for collaboration. However, he had fled to Spain, where the Francisco Franco regime protected him. In 1978, after he gave an interview claiming that the gas chambers of Auschwitz were used to kill lice, the French government requested his extradition. Spain refused. He died on 29 August 1980, near Málaga, Spain.

Helmut Knochen was sentenced to death by a British military tribunal in 1946 for the murder of British pilots. The sentence was never carried out. He was extradited to France in 1954 and again sentenced to death. The sentence was later commuted to life imprisonment. In 1962, French president Charles de Gaulle pardoned him and he was sent back to Germany, where he retired in Baden-Baden and died in 2003.

Émile Hennequin, head of Paris police, was sentenced to eight years' penal labour in June 1947.

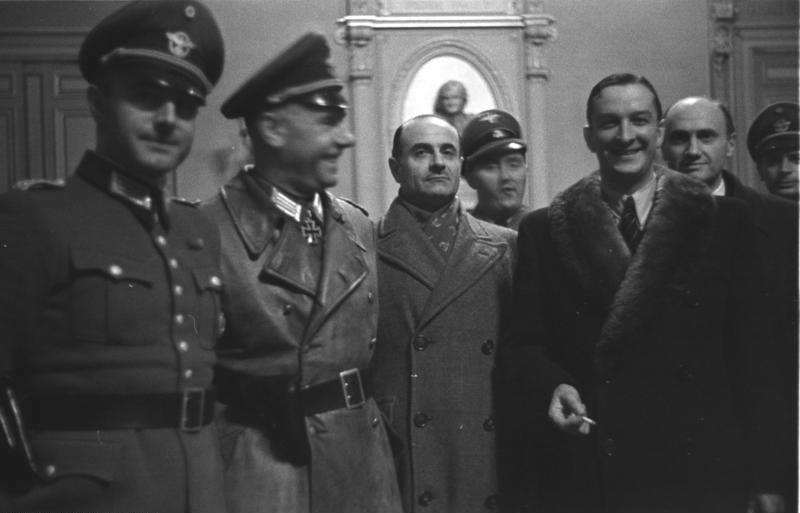
23 January 1943: German-Vichy French meeting in Marseille. SS-Sturmbannführer Bernhard Griese, Antoine Lemoine (regional préfet for Marseille), Rolf Mühler, (Commander of Marseille's Sicherheitspolizei), -laughing- René Bousquet (General Secretary of the French National Police created in 1941) creator of the GMRs, -behind- Louis Darquier de Pellepoix (Commissioner for Jewish Affairs).

René Bousquet was last to be tried, in 1949. He was acquitted of "compromising the interests of the national defence", but declared guilty of Indignité nationale for involvement in the Vichy government. He was given five years of dégradation nationale, a measure immediately lifted for "having actively and sustainably participated in the resistance against the occupier". Bousquet's position was always ambiguous; there were times he worked with the Germans and others when he worked against them. After the war he worked at the Banque d'Indochine and in newspapers. In 1957, the Conseil d'État gave back his Légion d'honneur, and he was given an amnesty on 17 January 1958. He stood for election that year as a candidate for the Marne. He was supported by the Democratic and Socialist Union of the Resistance; his second was Hector Bouilly, a radical-socialist general councillor. In 1974, Bousquet helped finance François Mitterrand's presidential campaign against Valéry Giscard d'Estaing. In 1986, as accusations cast on Bousquet grew more credible, particularly after he was named by Louis Darquier, he and Mitterrand stopped seeing each other. The parquet général de Paris closed the case by sending it to a court that no longer existed. Lawyers for the International Federation of Human Rights spoke of a "political decision at the highest levels to prevent the Bousquet affair from developing". In 1989, Serge Klarsfeld and his association des Fils et Filles des déportés juifs de France, the National Federation of deportees and internees, Resistants and Patriots and the Ligue des droits de l'homme filed a complaint against Bousquet for crimes against humanity for the deportation of 194 children. Bousquet was committed to trial but on 8 June 1993 a 55-year-old mental patient named Christian Didier entered his flat and shot him dead.

Theodor Dannecker was interned by the United States Army in December 1945 and a few days later committed suicide.

Jacques Doriot, whose French right-wing followers helped in the round-up, fled to the Sigmaringen enclave in Germany and became a member of the exile Vichy government there. He died in February 1945 when his car was strafed by Allied fighters while he was travelling from Mainau to Sigmaringen. He was buried in Mengen.

== Action against the police ==
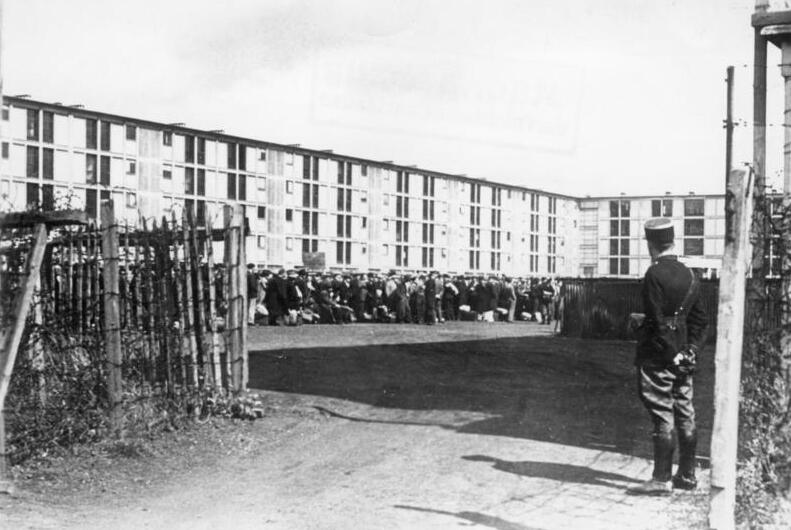
A French gendarme guarding Jews held at the Drancy internment camp

After the Liberation, survivors of the internment camp at Drancy began legal proceedings against gendarmes accused of being accomplices of the Nazis. An investigation began into 15 gendarmes, of whom 10 were accused at the Cour de justice of the Seine of conduct threatening the safety of the state. Three fled before the trial began. The other seven said they were only obeying orders, despite numerous witnesses and accounts by survivors of their brutality.

The court ruled on 22 March 1947 that the seven were guilty but that most had rehabilitated themselves "by active participation, useful and sustained, offered to the Resistance against the enemy." Two others were jailed for two years and condemned to dégradation nationale for five years. A year later they were reprieved.

== Government admission ==
For decades the French government declined to apologize for the role of French policemen in the roundup or for state complicity. De Gaulle and others argued that the French Republic had been dismantled when Philippe Pétain instituted a new French State during the war and that the Republic had been re-established after the Liberation. It was not for the Republic, therefore, to apologise for events caused by a state which France did not recognise. President François Mitterrand reiterated this position in a September 1994 speech.

They want the Republic, they want France to fall to her knees, to apologize for Vichy's crime. Well, that,... I will never accept it because historically it is not right. The truth is that on 10 July 1940, the Republic handed Marshal Pétain a blank check, without knowing what he would do with the unlimited power he was receiving. And on 11 July, he did away with all republican forms of power. The Republic therefore has nothing to do with what happened from 11 July to the Liberation. Vichy was an accidental regime that existed only because of the enemy occupation.

— François Mitterrand

On 16 July 1995, the newly elected Gaullist President, Jacques Chirac, reversed that position, stating that it was time that France faced up to its past. He acknowledged the role that "the French State" played in the persecution of Jews and others during the War.

Il est difficile de les évoquer, aussi, parce que ces heures noires souillent à jamais notre histoire, et sont une injure à notre passé et à nos traditions. Oui, la folie criminelle de l'occupant a été secondée par des Français, par l'Etat français. Il y a cinquante-trois ans, le 16 juillet 1942, 450 policiers et gendarmes français, sous l'autorité de leurs chefs, répondaient aux exigences des nazis. Ce jour-là, dans la capitale et en région parisienne, près de dix mille hommes, femmes et enfants juifs furent arrêtés à leur domicile, au petit matin, et rassemblés dans les commissariats de police. ... La France, patrie des Lumières et des Droits de l'Homme, terre d'accueil et d'asile, la France, ce jour-là, accomplissait l'irréparable. Manquant à sa parole, elle livrait ses protégés à leurs bourreaux. ("These black hours will stain our history forever and are an injury to our past and our traditions. Yes, the criminal madness of the occupier was assisted by the French, by the French state. Fifty-three years ago, on 16 July 1942, 450 French policemen and gendarmes, under the authority of their leaders, obeyed the demands of the Nazis. That day, in the capital and the Paris region, nearly 10,000 Jewish men, women and children were arrested at home, in the early hours of the morning, and assembled at police stations... France, home of the Enlightenment and the Rights of Man, land of welcome and asylum, France committed on that day the irreparable. Breaking its word, it delivered those it protected to their executioners.")

To mark the 70th anniversary of the Vél d'Hiv' roundup, President François Hollande gave a speech at the monument on 22 July 2012. The president recognized that this event was a crime committed "in France, by France," and emphasized that the deportations in which French police participated were offences committed against French values, principles, and ideals.

The earlier claim that the Government of France during World War II was some illegitimate group was again advanced by Marine Le Pen, leader of the National Front Party, during the 2017 election campaign. In speeches, she claimed that the Vichy government was "not France".

On 16 July 2017, also in commemoration of the victims of the roundup, President Emmanuel Macron denounced his country's role in the Holocaust and the historical revisionism that denied France's responsibility for 1942 roundup and subsequent deportation of 13,000 Jews. "It was indeed France that organised this [roundup]", he said, French police collaborating with the Nazis. "Not a single German took part," he added. Chirac had already stated that the government during the War represented the French state. Macron was even more specific in this respect: "It is convenient to see the Vichy regime as born of nothingness, returned to nothingness. Yes, it's convenient, but it is false. We cannot build pride upon a lie."

Macron made a subtle reference to Chirac's 1995 apology when he added, "I say it again here. It was indeed France that organized the roundup, the deportation, and thus, for almost all, death."

== Memorials and monuments ==
=== Paris ===
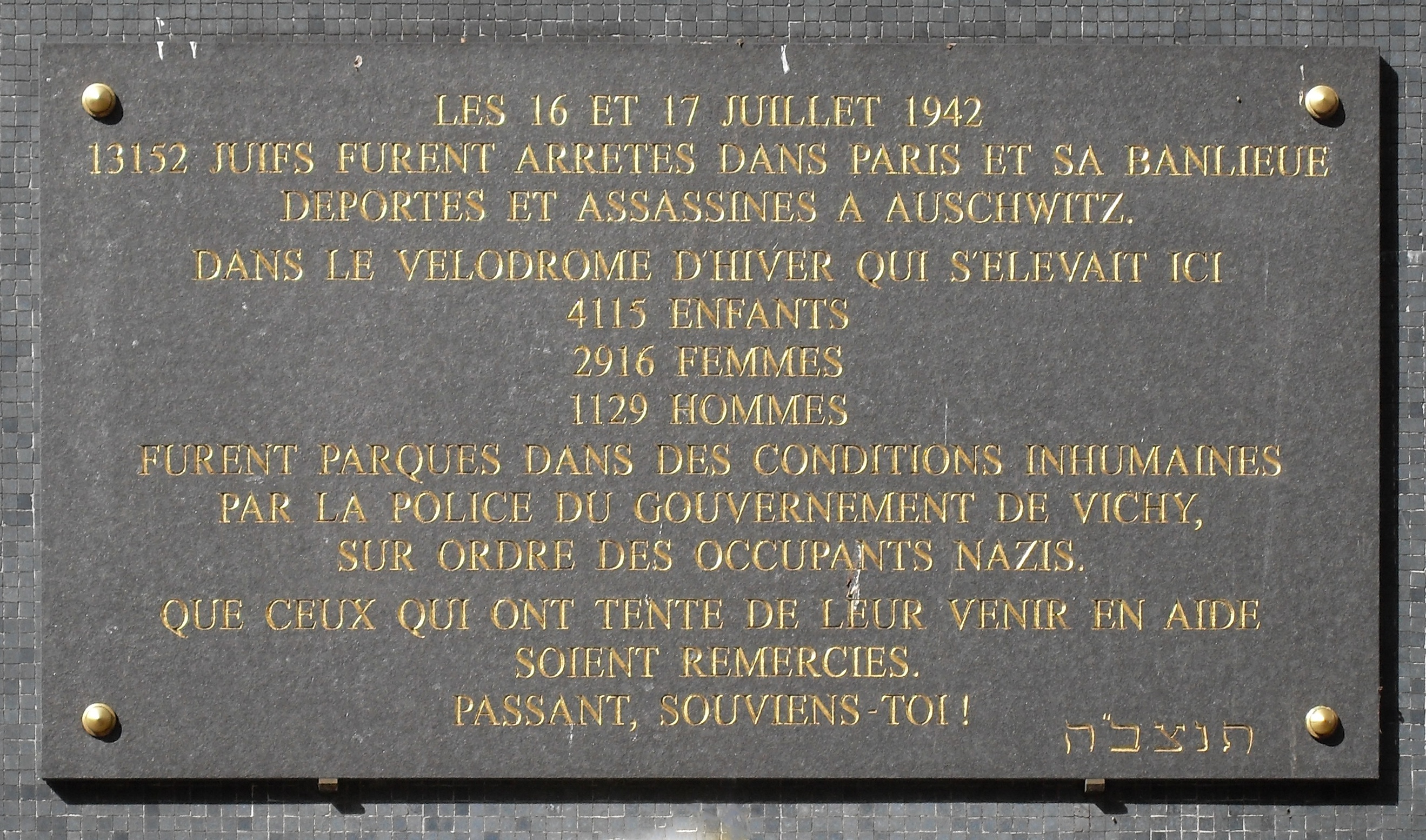
Commemorative plaque to the 8,160 victims held in the Vel' d'Hiv after the 16–17 July 1942 roundup of Jews in Paris. Inaugurated on 20 July 2008, the plaque is facing the Bir-Hakeim metro station on the Boulevard de Grenelle in the (15th arrondissement of Paris), a few meters from the site of the former Vel d'Hiv

A fire destroyed part of the Vélodrome d'Hiver in 1959 and the rest of the structure was demolished. A block of flats and a building belonging to the Ministry of the Interior now stand on the site. A plaque marking the Vel' d'Hiv' Roundup was placed on the track building after the War and moved to 8 boulevard de Grenelle in 1959.

On 3 February 1993, President François Mitterrand commissioned a monument to be erected on the site. It stands now on a curved base, to represent the cycle track, on the edge of the quai de Grenelle. It is the work of the Polish sculptor Walter Spitzer and the architect Mario Azagury. Spitzer's family were survivors of deportation to Auschwitz. The statue represents all deportees but especially those of the Vel' d'Hiv'. The sculptures include children, a pregnant woman and a sick man. The words on the Mitterrand-era monument still differentiate between the French Republic and the Vichy Government that ruled during WW II, so they do not accept State responsibility for the roundup of the Jews. The words are in French: "La République française en hommage aux victimes des persécutions racistes et antisémites et des crimes contre l’humanité commis sous l’autorité de fait dite ‘gouvernement de l’État français’ (1940–1944) N’oublions jamais", which translate as follows: "The French Republic pays homage to the victims of racist and anti-Semitic persecutions and crimes against humanity committed under the de facto authority called the 'Government of the French State' 1940–1944. Let us never forget." The monument was inaugurated on 17 July 1994. A commemorative ceremony is held here every year in July.

A memorial plaque in memory of victims of the Vel' d'Hiv' raid was placed at the Bir-Hakeim station of the Paris Métro on 20 July 2008. The ceremony was led by Jean-Marie Bockel, Secretary of Defense and Veterans Affairs, and was attended by Simone Veil, a deportee and former minister, anti-Nazi activist Beate Klarsfeld, and numerous dignitaries.

=== Drancy ===
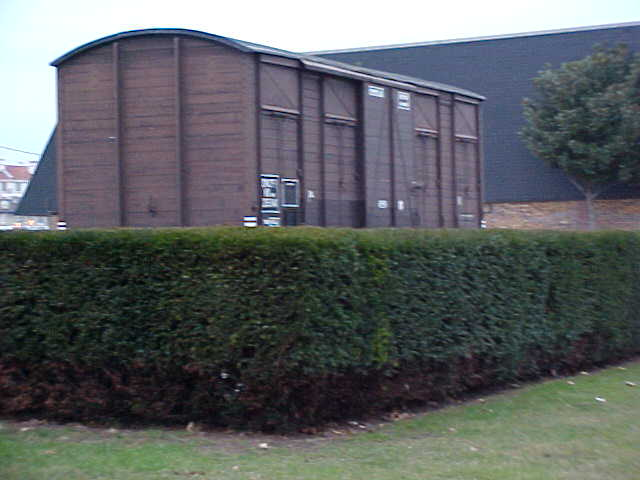
A railway wagon used to carry internees to Auschwitz and now displayed at Drancy

A memorial was also constructed in 1976 at Drancy internment camp, after a design competition won by Shelomo Selinger. It stands beside a rail wagon of the sort used to take prisoners to the death camps. It is three blocks forming the Hebrew letter Shin, traditionally written on the Mezuzah at the door of houses occupied by Jews. Two other blocks represent the gates of death. Shelomo Selinger said of his work: "The central block is composed of 10 figures, the number needed for collective prayer (Minyan). The two Hebrew letters Lamed and Vav are formed by the hair, the arm and the beard of two people at the top of the sculpture. These letters have the numeric 36, the number of Righteous thanks to whom the world exists according to Jewish tradition."

On 25 May 2001, the cité de la Muette—formal name of the Drancy apartment blocks—was declared a national monument by the culture minister, Catherine Tasca.

A new Shoah memorial museum was opened in 2012 just opposite the sculpture memorial and railway wagon by President François Hollande. It provides details of the persecution of the Jews in France and many personal mementos of inmates before their deportation to Auschwitz and their death. They include messages written on the walls, graffiti, drinking mugs and other personal belongings left by the prisoners, some of which are inscribed with the names of the owners. The ground floor also shows a changing exhibit of prisoner faces and names, as a memorial to their imprisonment and then murder by the Germans, assisted by the French gendarmerie.

The Holocaust researcher Serge Klarsfeld said in 2004: "Drancy is the best known place for everyone of the memory of the Shoah in France; in the crypt of Yad Vashem (Jérusalem), where stones are engraved with the names of the most notorious Jewish concentration and extermination camps, Drancy is the only place of memory in France to feature."

== Film documentaries and books ==
- André Bossuroy, 2011. ICH BIN with the support from the Fondation Hippocrène and from the EACEA Agency of the European Commission (Programme Europe for citizens – An active European remembrance), RTBF, VRT.
- William Karel, 1992. La Rafle du Vel-d'Hiv, La Marche du siècle, France 3.
- Annette Muller, La petite fille du Vel' d'Hiv, Publisher Denoël, Paris, 1991. New edition by Annette et Manek Muller, La petite fille du Vel' d'Hiv, Publisher Cercil, Orléans, 2009, preface by Serge Klarsfeld, prize Lutèce (Témoignage).
- Tatiana de Rosnay, Sarah's Key (novel), book: St. Martin's Press, 2007, ISBN 978-0-312-37083-1 (also 2010 film)

The events form the framework of:

- Les Guichets du Louvre, 1974. French film directed by Michel Mitrani.
- Monsieur Klein, 1976. French film directed by Joseph Losey, much of which was shot on location. The film won the 1977 César Awards in the categories of Best Film, Best Director, and Best Production Design.
- Velódromo del invierno, 2001. Novel by Juana Salabert which won the 2001 Premio Biblioteca Breve.
- The Round Up (La Rafle), 2010. French film directed by Roselyne Bosch and produced by Alain Goldman.
- Sarah's Key, 2010. French film directed by Gilles Paquet-Brenner and produced by Stéphane Marsil.

== See also ==
- Reparations (transitional justice)
- The Holocaust in France
- Timeline of deportations of French Jews to death camps
- Union générale des israélites de France
- Vichy France
