= Châteauvallon =

1985 French TV series

- Genre: Drama
- Created by: Georges Conchon; Jean-Pierre Petrolacci
- Starring: Chantal Nobel; Raymond Pellegrin; Luc Merenda; Georges Marchal; Jean Davy; Barbara Cupisti; Denis Savignat; Pierre Hatet; Philippe Rouleau; Claude-Oliver Rudolph; Ugo Pagliai
- Music by: Vladimir Cosma
- Opening theme: Puissance et gloire
- Country of origin: France; Italy; Luxembourg; Switzerland; United Kingdom
- No. of series: 1
- No. of episodes: 26

Production
- Executive producers: Claude Matalou; Jacques Dercourt
- Producer: Roland Gritti
- Running time: 52 minutes
- Production companies: Antenne 2 Maintenon Films; RAI Radiotelevisione Italiana; RTL; S4C; Telfrance; Télécip; Télévision Suisse Romande (TSR )
- Budget: 55 million francs (€8.5 million)

Original release
- Network: Antenne 2
- Release: January 4 – June 28, 1985

Châteauvallon is a soap opera consisting of 26 episodes, each lasting around 52 minutes, created by Georges Conchon and Jean-Pierre Petrolacci. It was broadcast in France between 4 January 1985 and 28 June 1985 on Antenne 2, and saw subsequent reruns on Antenne 2, TMC, RTL9 and NT1. It was a Franco-Swiss-British-Italian-Luxembourgish co-production.

== Synopsis ==
On the banks of the Loire, in Châteauvallon, lives the rich and powerful Berg family. At their chateau, La Commanderie, a double celebration is underway: the patriarch Antonin (Jean Davy) is celebrating his birthday, as well as the anniversary of his newspaper La Dépêche républicaine (The republican Telegram). Florence (Chantal Nobel), the 'cursed' daughter, is also set to return during the party, and her father would like to see her take up his torch.

The very next day, the body of journalist Paul Bossis (Yann Dedet) is found in the park. He was investigating the dubious real estate transaction of the Sablons, and André Travers (Luc Merenda), a friend of Paul's and also a journalist decides to carry out his own investigation. Secrets, lies and betrayals soon emerge. At the same time, the Kovalic clan, Yugoslav emigrants led by Gregor (Alexandre Rignault) and Albertas (Catherine Alcover), are trying to take over the city and aspire to dethrone the Bergs, with whom they have serious grievances.

== Cast ==
=== Main cast ===
- Chantal Nobel: Florence Berg, lawyer and daughter of Antonin
- Raymond Pellegrin: Albertas Kovalic
- Luc Merenda: André Travers, journalist and lover of Florence
- Georges Marchal: Gilbert Bossis, lover of Gabrielle Berg
- Jean Davy: Antonin Berg, father of Florence and boss of the newspaper La Dépêche
- Barbara Cupisti: Alexandra Wilson-Berg, daughter of Florence
- Denis Savignat: Armand Berg, surgeon and Florence's favorite brother
- Pierre Hatet: Jean-Jacques Berg, editor-in-chief of La Dépêche and brother of Florence
- Philippe Rouleau: Philippe Berg, nephew of the Berg family
- Claude-Oliver Rudolph: Bernard Kovalic
- Ugo Pagliai: Artus Balestra, lover of Florence

=== Supporting cast ===
- Evelyne Dandry: Maryse, friend of André Travers
- Sylvie Fennec: Thérèse Berg, wife of Julien
- Marie Keime: Marie-Louise “Marie-Lou” Berg, wife of Jean-Jacques
- Malka Ribowska: Mathilde, governess of the Berg family
- François Perrot: Georges Quentin, lover of Florence
- Sylvia Zerbib: Catherine Kovalic, companion of Paul Bossis
- Vincent Gauthier: Julien Berg, younger brother of Florence
- Nadine Alari: Mme Quentin, wife of Georges
- Gérard Buhr: Adrien Jérôme
- Alexandre Rignault: Gregor Kovalic
- Jacques Morel: Chambonas, campaign advisor to Armand Berg.
- François Maistre: the minister
- Jean Carmet: the forger
- Emilie Benoît: Émilie Berg, wife of Philippe
- Muriel Montossé: Gabrielle Berg, wife of Antonin
- Paul Blain: Teddy Kovalic, son of Albertas
- Catherine Alcover: Mrs. Kovalic
- Christine Fabréga: Zoé Kovalic
- Patrick Burgel: Commissioner Nicolo
- Serge Sauvion: Inspector Germain
- François-Éric Gendron: the airplane pilot, lover of Thérèse Berg
- Jean-Pierre Bernard: Philippe Berg's lawyer
- Julie Arnold: Julie, switchboard operator
- Philippe Lavot
- Jean-Michel Molé: Melchior
- Mathé Souverbie: a guest
- Jacqueline Noëlle: Ms. Frochot
- Kriss Alluin: Anne Vernier, young drug addict and partner of Armand Berg
- Yann Dedet: Paul Bossis, son of Gilbert Bossis and Gabrielle Berg
- Evelyne Dress: Arlette Mouly
- Isabelle Linnartz: Chantal
- Patricia Malvoisin: Sophia
- Marie-Thérèse Orain: Colette
- Colette Teissèdre: Fernandez
- André Cellier: Boulard
- André Penvern: Condroyer
- Claude Title: Maurice
- Jean-Pierre Leclerc: Jeanou
- Henri Poirier: the prefect
- Bernard Rapp: himself, television journalist
- Christine Ockrent: herself, television journalist

== Production ==
=== Genesis and development ===
At the beginning of the 1980s, Pierre Desgraupes, then president and CEO of Antenne 2, wanted a French-style Dallas series to compete with broadcasts of the American soap on TF1, and entrusted it to Georges Conchon for development. The latter, writing the first six episodes, brought together around fifteen screenwriters, including Jean-Pierre Petrolacci who would write the following 20 episodes.

The production was entrusted to Paul Planchon and Serge Friedman.

The budget for the series was 55 million francs (€8.5 million).

=== Filming ===
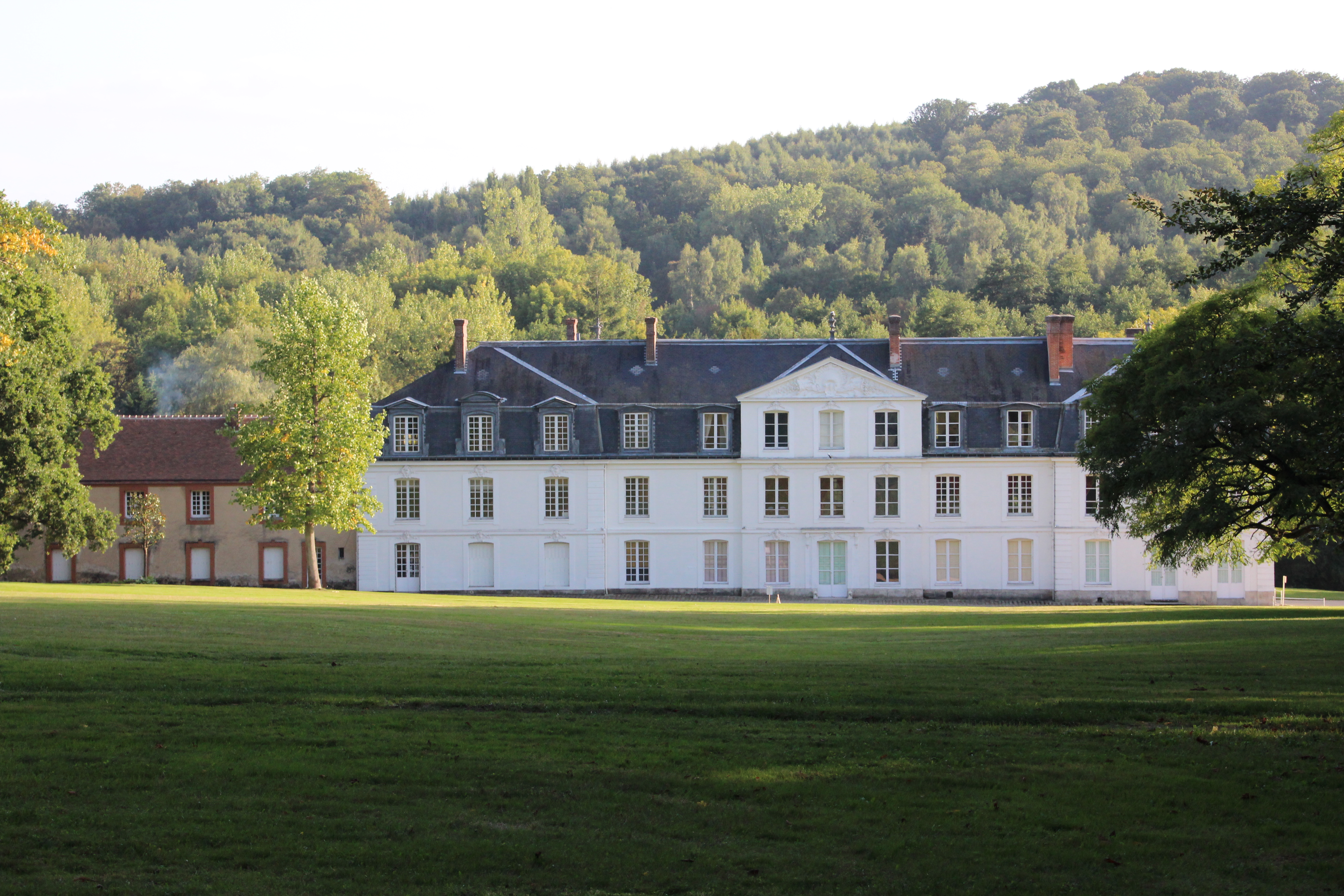
The Château de Mauvières - “La Commanderie” in the series.

Filming took place between November 28, 1983, and October 18, 1984, in the town of Rambouillet, Yvelines and the chateau of Mauvières, in Saint-Forget, which was transformed into the Berg family residence “La Commanderie”.

=== Music ===
The series music was composed by Vladimir Cosma, whose original soundtrack was released in 1985 by Carrere Records.

The theme song, Puissance et Gloire (Power and Glory), was performed by Herbert Léonard, using lyrics written by Vline Buggy and a music composed by Vladimir Cosma.

Track listing

1. Power and glory (3:16)
2. The Kovalic (2:27)
3. Commissioner Nicolo (2:27)
4. The death of Antoninus (3:10)
5. La Dépêche (1:47)
6. Suspense at the sablons (1:35)
7. The streets of Châteauvallon (2:27)
8. Theme of the Bergs (3:19)
9. Châteauvallon (3:26)
10. Paul and Catherine (2:56)
11. Florence's Theme (2:51)
12. Shady dealings (3:29)
13. Bernard and Albertas (2:13)
14. Blackmail (2:57)
15. The Commanderie (2:40)

== Reception ==
=== Audiences ===
Châteauvallon was a huge success during its first broadcast, on January 4, 1985. The first episode brought together nearly 14 million viewers and the second 17 million, which constitutes a record in the history of television, making the soap opera a social phenomenon.

=== Reviews ===
Télé 7 jours wrote that:

the French “Dallas” is more demure than its American model. Less sex, no alcohol. But political-financial shenanigans and rivalries within a large provincial family. A homogeneous distribution featuring Jean Davy, superb as an authoritarian patriarch

=== Setting ===
Although filmed in 1984 and broadcast in 1985, the action of the series actually takes place from 1978 to 1980, as indicated by the dialogues in the last two episodes. The official portrait of the President of the Republic visible at the town hall is that of Valéry Giscard d'Estaing. The context of Georges Quentin's suicide is also a fairly transparent allusion to the Robert Boulin affair, just as the Boulard press group evokes the Hersant group.

=== Tragic fate ===
More than the story, the credits of the soap opera and the tragic fate of Chantal Nobel are what viewers have kept in their memory. The song Puissance et gloire (Power and glory), performed by Herbert Léonard, is today one of the cult TV theme tunes. Châteauvallon never saw the follow-up that was to be given to the first season.

On April 28, 1985, at 3:20 a.m., Chantal Nobel's career came to an abrupt end after a recording of the show Champs-Élysées. She was the victim of serious car accident in a Porsche 924 Carrera GT driven by the singer Sacha Distel, whilst driving past Maltaverne, a small village near Tracy-sur-Loire.

After twenty-one days spent in a coma at the Pitié-Salpêtrière Hospital, with serious facial injuries and 80% disabled for life, Chantal Nobel withdrew from public life to the South of France, immediately putting an end to the Châteauvallon series. She later filed a lawsuit against Sacha Distel.

=== Production values ===
Each episode of Châteauvallon cost nearly 2 million francs, but the production resources were not always up to par. Thus, Chantal Nobel often dressed in her own clothes, the costume budget being insufficient for the luxury outfits that Florence had to wear.

=== Exporting abroad ===
In the United Kingdom, the series was broadcast on Channel 4 twice a week (once dubbed into English, once with subtitles).

=== Cameos ===
Antenne 2 News presenters Bernard Rapp and Christine Ockrent appeared in the series, in their own roles. Bernard Rapp appeared in episodes 16 and 17 and Christine Ockrent in episode 22.

The head decorator was Michel Decaix (1934-1987), painter and theater man, founder of the theater troupe from Trappes in Yvelines Les Coquillards.

Châteauvallon is supposed to be located in Loir-et-Cher, but the exterior shots showing the town were filmed in Tours.

=== Repeats ===
It was rebroadcast in France several times: from 1988 to 1992 on La Cinq, from 1992 to 1993 on France 3, from 1993 to 1996 on TMC, from 1996 to 1999 on TF1. From 1999 to 2000 on La Cinquième, from 2001 to 2004 on RTL9 and from 2005 to 2008 on NT1.

In Québec, the series was broadcast from 12 January 1988 on Télévision de Radio-Canada.

== Assumed similarities with the real-life situation in Toulouse ==
The story recalls the situation in Toulouse which for years had pitted the Baylet family, owner of the newspaper La Dépêche du Midi, against the Baudis, father to son mayors of the city for thirty years.

On one side, the Baylet family:

- Jean Baylet: the patriarch, historical owner of the newspaper. He died in the 1950s, during a car accident that was widely discussed at the time. He has his street in Toulouse, where the newspaper's headquarters are located;
- Évelyne Baylet: the mother, who took the reins of the newspaper on the death of her husband to reign there as mistress wife for a few decades and beyond, since she then appeared in the organization chart as president of 'honor;
- Jean-Michel Baylet: the son, becomes CEO of the group La Dépêche du Midi, head of the editorial staff, president of the Radical Left Party, senator and president of the general council of Tarn-et-Garonne;
- the girls: Martine, interested in the newspaper by her shares in the capital and Danièle, the black sheep of the clan, the one who betrayed to rally the enemy family, that of the Baudis.

On the other side, the Baudis:

- Pierre Baudis: mayor of Toulouse for 12 years, who will pass on the office to his son;
- Dominique Baudis: the son, mayor of Toulouse for 18 years, then president of the Superior Audiovisual Council from 2001 to 2007.

The resemblance with the soap opera was such that Évelyne-Jean Baylet tried in vain to have its broadcast banned, except for the infamous disclaimer in the credits: “The name of the daily newspaper owned by the Berg family was chosen because of its banality. It cannot therefore be confused with that of an existing daily newspaper.”
