= René Bousquet =

French police chief (1942–1943)

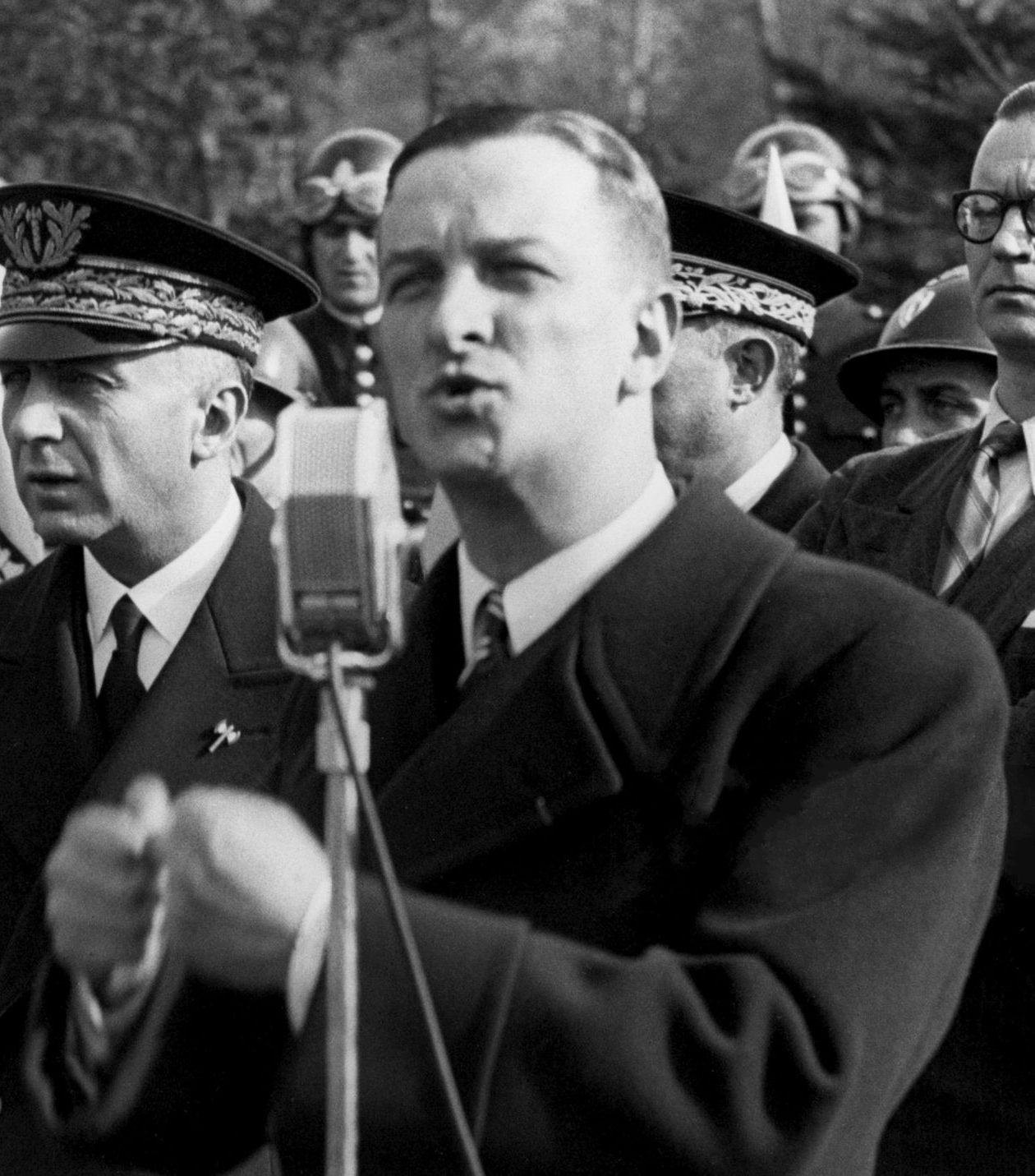
- Bousquet in 1943
- Born: 11 May 1909; Montauban, France
- Died: 8 June 1993 (aged 84); 16th arrondissement of Paris, Paris, France
- Cause of death: Assassination by gunshot
- Education: University of Toulouse
- Occupation: Civil servant

Signature
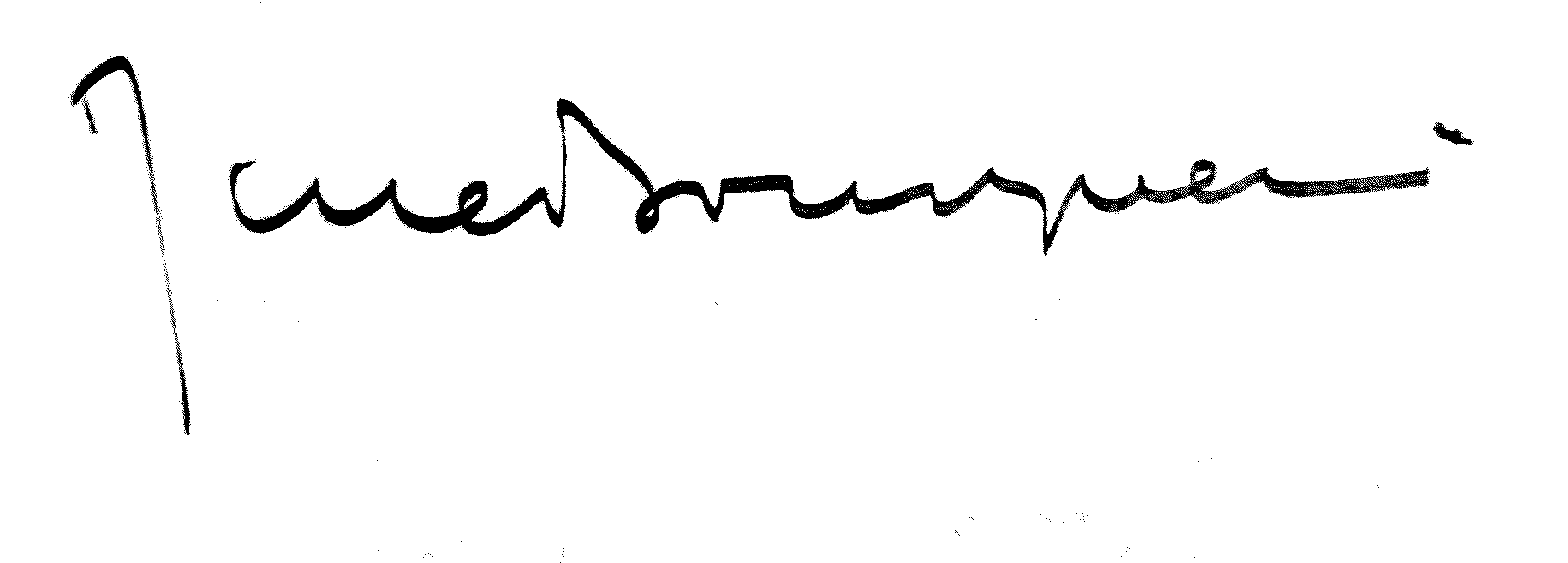

René Bousquet (French: [ʁəne buskɛ]; 11 May 1909 – 8 June 1993) was a high-ranking French political appointee who served as secretary general to the Vichy French police from May 1942 to 31 December 1943. For personal heroism, he had become a protégé of prominent officials before the war and had risen rapidly in the government.

In 1949, Bousquet was automatically convicted as a Vichy official and sentenced to five years of dégradation nationale, but his sentence was reduced due to beliefs that he also aided the French Resistance and attempted to preserve some autonomy for French police during the German occupation. Excluded from the government, he went into business. After receiving amnesty in 1959, Bousquet became active again in politics by supporting left-wing politicians through the 1970s and becoming a regular visitor in the 1980s of François Mitterrand after his election as president.

In 1989, after years of increasing accusations about his activities during the war, Bousquet was accused by three groups of crimes against humanity. He was ultimately indicted by the French Ministry of Justice in 1991 for his decisions during the Vel' d'Hiv roundup in 1942, which led to Jewish children being deported and killed in German extermination camps in Eastern Europe. Bousquet was assassinated in 1993 by Christian Didier shortly before his trial was set to begin.

== Early life and career ==
René Bousquet was born to a radical socialist notary in Montauban, Tarn-et-Garonne. After his law studies, he began his career as chief of the cabinet of the préfet for Tarn-et-Garonne.

In March 1930, he and a friend, the latter dying during the episode, became national heroes after they had personally saved dozens of people from drowning during floods in southwestern France. He was awarded the Legion of Honour and the Médaille d'or des belles actions ("Golden medal for fine deeds"). Maurice Sarraut, the Radical Socialist senator and CEO of La Dépêche du Midi, and Albert Sarraut, deputy, president of the Council and minister, took on Bousquet as their protégé. Bousquet was detached to the Presidency of the Council to head the technical service in charge of the reconstruction of the flooded southern regions. He had a rapid rise within the government and gained increasingly-responsible appointments.

At the age of 22, he became second of the cabinet of Interior Minister Pierre Cathala. In 1933, Bousquet was promoted to sous-préfet, and in 1935, he was appointed as general director of the national cabinet of the Minister for Agriculture. The next year, Bousquet was given responsibility for the central files of the National Security.

In April 1938, Interior Minister Sarraut named Bousquet sous-préfet for Vitry-le-François (Marne). In 1939, he became general secretary of the préfecture for Châlons-sur-Marne (now Châlons-en-Champagne).

== World War II ==
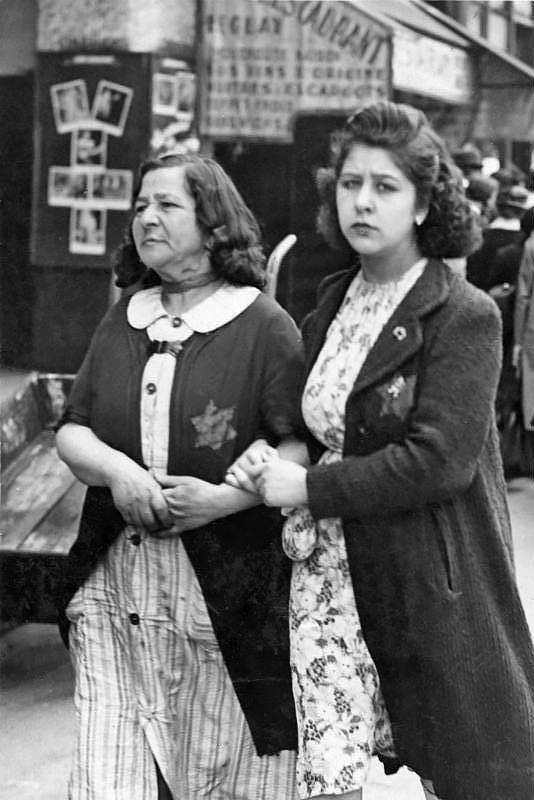
Two Jewish women in occupied Paris wearing the Yellow Star of David badge in June 1942, a few weeks before the mass arrest

In 1940, Bousquet was appointed as préfet after the Armistice with Germany.

In September 1941, he was appointed as the youngest regional préfet. Because of his Radical Socialist background, he was frequently attacked by the collaborationist newspaper Je suis partout. He helped some prisoners-of-war to escape and worked to lighten the economic toll of the Nazi occupation on the Marne department.

In 1942, Admiral François Darlan offered him the Ministry of Agriculture, which Bousquet twice refused.

In April 1942, as the Schutzstaffel (SS) was taking over security duties in the Occupied Zone, Pierre Laval appointed Bousquet general secretary to the police. Bousquet was given permanent credentials to sign on behalf of the head of state. On 6 May or 7 May 1942, Bousquet sought and obtained consent from the SS to transfer another 5000 Jews from Drancy internment camp to the concentration camps in the East.

Higher SS and Police Leader Carl Oberg was in charge of the German police in France. Bousquet worked with him and obtained some autonomy for the French police by promising to collaborate with the Germans. Bousquet concentrated all police services under his personal authority and suppressed the branch led by Darquier de Pellepoix, general commissary of Jewish affairs.

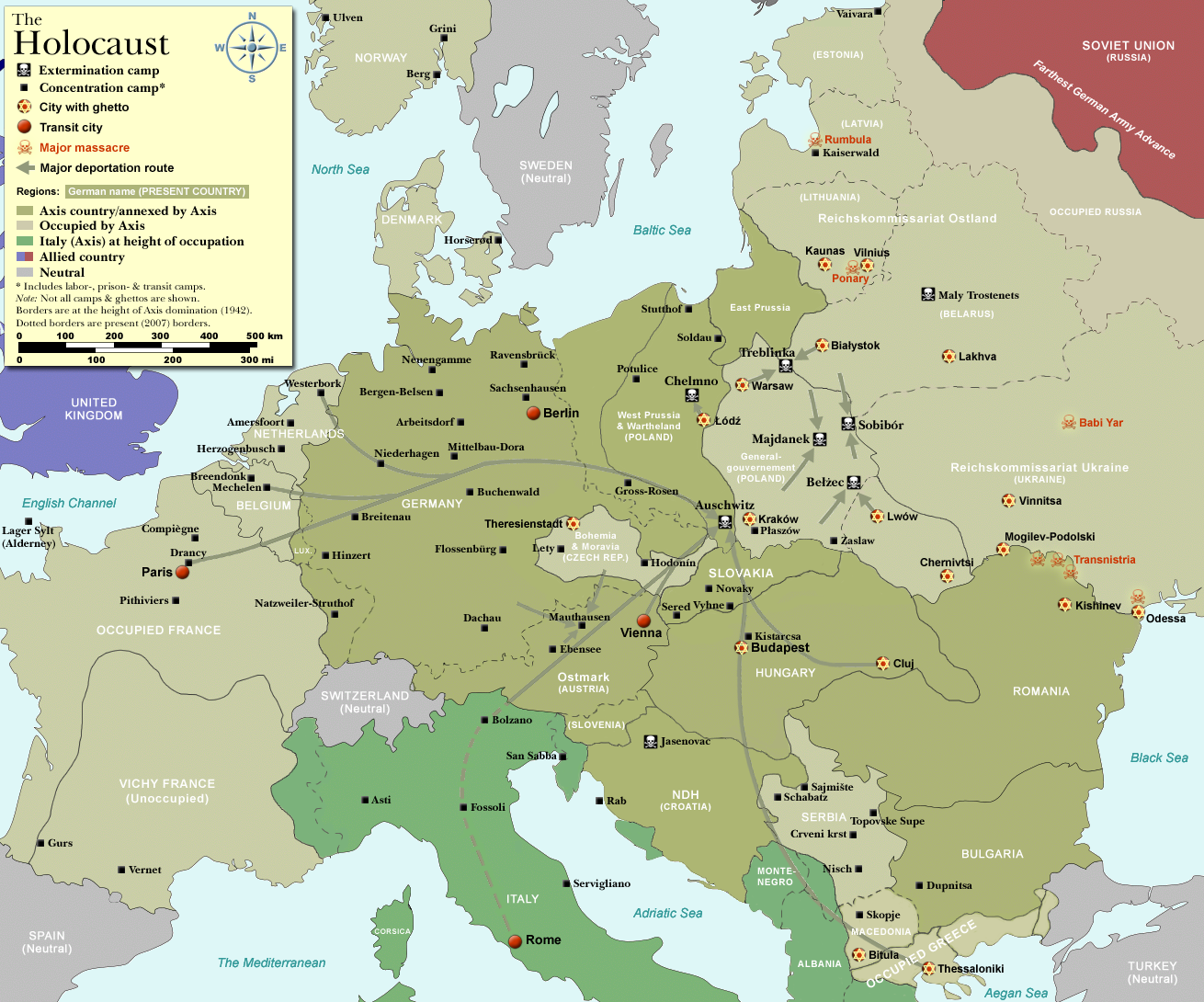
The deportation route from Paris to Auschwitz

On 2 July 1942, Bousquet and Oberg prepared the arrests known as the Vel' d'Hiv roundup (rafle du Vel' d'Hiv), which rounded up foreign and stateless Jews for deportation. Bousquet personally cancelled orders protecting some categories of people from arrests, notably children under 18 and parents with children under 5. After the arrests, some Catholic bishops and cardinals protested, and Bousquet threatened to cancel tax privileges for Catholic schools.

Under the pretext of not separating families, Prime Minister Pierre Laval ordered that Jewish children under 16 be included in deportation convoys, which exceeded the Nazis' requirements. Bousquet obliged and expanded the deportation to parents and their children under 2. In the event, children were separated from their parents and deported in different groups. Nonetheless, some scholarly sources insist that the Vichy government was unaware of the purpose of the deportation and believed that the Jews were being taken to provide a labour force in the East.

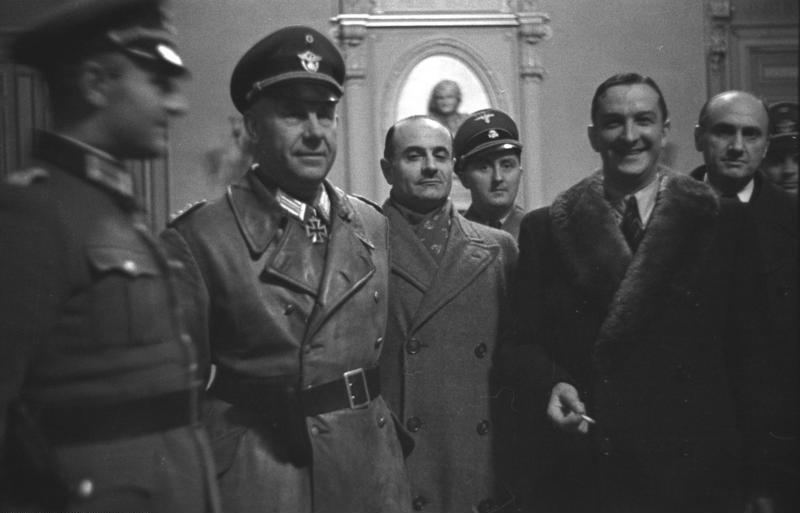
René Bousquet, in fur-trimmed coat, posing with Nazi German officials in 1943.

Bousquet negotiated the "Oberg-Bousquet" deal, which was presented to all regional préfets on 8 August 1942. It formally recognised the autonomy of the French police and Gendarmerie and said that the French police would not be compelled to provide hostages or to hand their prisoners over to German services. However, three days later, the Germans demanded the French provide 70 hostages in retaliation for the murder of eight Germans.

In January 1943, Bousquet aided Oberg in the organization and execution of a massive raid in Marseille, known as the Round up of Marseille. The French police assisted the German police in expelling 30,000 people from the city's Old Port. They later destroyed the neighbourhood, which the German police considered a "terrorist nest" because of its many narrow and winding streets. Bousquet offered his services for that operation. As the French police controlled the identity documents of 40,000 people, their assistance allowed the operation to send 2,000 Jews living in the city to concentration camps. That occasion was supervised by Oberg, who had come from Paris. He gave Bousquet orders that had been directly received from Heinrich Himmler. It is a notable case of the French police willingly collaborating with the Germans.

In April 1943, Bousquet met with Himmler, who declared himself "impressed by Bousquet's personality" and mentioned him as a "precious collaborator in the framework of police collaboration".

Bousquet was then also an advisor to Pierre Laval, along with Jean Jardin and Charles Rochat. Bousquet was controversial and became resented by his fellow collaborationists and competitors for power, such as Justice Minister Joseph Barthélémy.

On 2 December 1943, men of the Milice, the French collaborationist paramilitary organisation, assassinated Maurice Sarraut. Bousquet was set to arrest those responsible, and the Milice asked Berlin to have Bousquet removed. After ordering releases and destroying his archives, Bousquet resigned on 31 December 1943 and was replaced by Joseph Darnand, the head of the Milice.

Put in the reserve of the civil corps, Bousquet was under surveillance for nearly two weeks in a villa in Neuilly-sur-Seine. He then drove to Germany in a car that had been lent by Oberg.

In early 1944, the collaborationist press, including Je suis partout, attacked Bousquet and accused him of having served in the Vichy administration only to favour the Resistance. His cabinet director,(and fellow Vichy collaborationist) Jean-Paul Martin,[b.Dec 31,1913-Dec 12,1986] was reported to have also helped some Resistance networks.

Bousquet was in Bavaria during the German surrender. He returned to France with the status of a "deported person". He met with Laval to help the latter prepare for his trial. Convicted of collaboration, Laval was sentenced to death. Bousquet spent part of the night with Laval before the execution.

== Trial ==
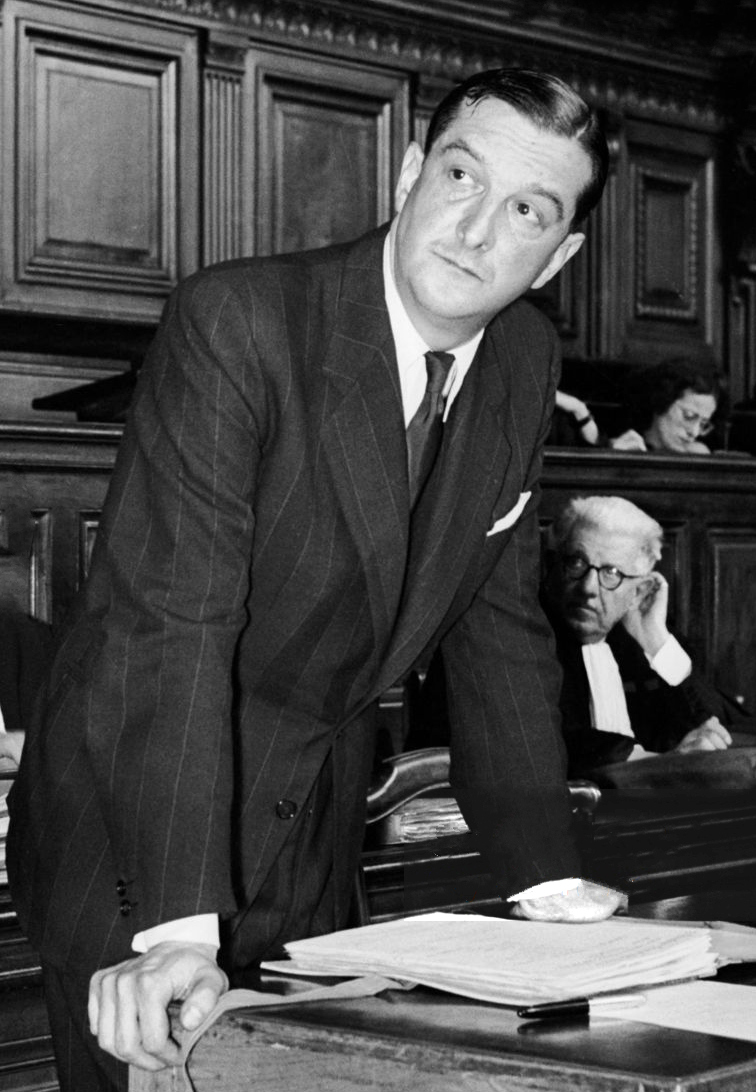
Bousquet at his trial in June 1948

In 1949, Bousquet was the last Frenchman to be tried by the Haute Cour de Justice, which had been created on 18 November 1944. He was acquitted of the charge of "compromising the interests of the national defence" but was automatically declared guilty of indignité nationale for his involvement in the Vichy government. He was given the minimum sentence of five years on dégradation nationale, a measure that was immediately lifted for "having actively and sustainably participated in the Resistance against the occupier".

As with other Vichy officials, Bousquet was excluded from the French public service. He made a career at the Banque de l'Indochine and in newspapers. He met François Mitterrand through Jean-Paul Martin, Bousquet's former collaborator in Vichy. Martin was then minister of oversea territories and the director of Mitterrand's cabinet.

In 1957, the Conseil d'État returned Bousquet's Legion of Honour. He was granted amnesty on 17 January 1958.

== Renewal of political career ==
In the legislative elections of 1958, Bousquet ran as a candidate for the 3rd circonscription of the Marne. He was supported by the Democratic and Socialist Union of the Resistance; his second was Hector Bouilly, a radical-socialist general councillor. Bousquet earned less than 10% of the votes.

After Jean Baylet's death in 1959, Bousquet was appointed to the Council of administration of the newspaper La Dépêche du Midi. He supported Mitterrand's candidacy in 1965 and observed an anti-Gaullist editorial line. After Bousquet quit in 1971, the tone of the newspaper softened.

In 1974, Bousquet supported and helped finance Mitterrand in the presidential election against Valéry Giscard d'Estaing. Bousquet was acquainted with numerous other political and cultural figures, such as Antoine Pinay, Bernard Cornut-Gentille, Jacques Chaban-Delmas, Edgar Faure and Maurice Faure. He was part of the administration council of Union de Transports Aériens.

After Mitterrand's election in the 1981 presidential election, Bousquet occasionally met him at the Élysée to "talk about politics". In 1986, Mitterrand distanced himself from Bousquet when opposition groups accused Bousquet of crimes against humanity during World War II. Mitterrand said he had ended the relationship after Bousquet was charged with crimes against humanity for organising mass deportations of Jews.

The parquet général de Paris closed Bousquet's case by sending it to a court that no longer existed, which stirred outrage.

== Trial and murder ==
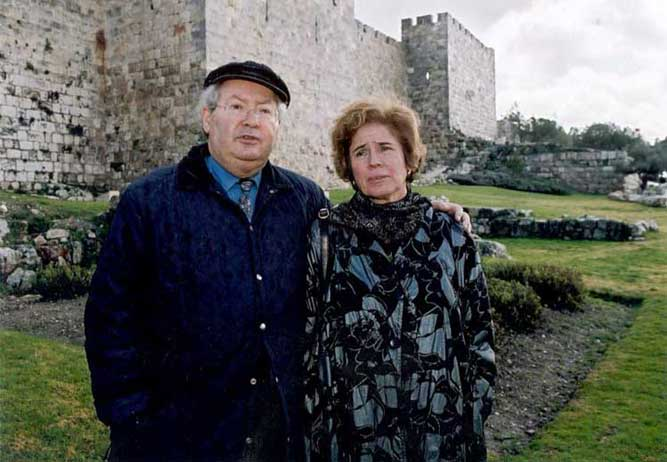
Serge and Beate Klarsfeld visiting Jerusalem

In 1989, Serge Klarsfeld and his Association des fils et filles des déportés juifs de France (Sons and daughters of Jewish Deportees from France), the National Federation of deportees and internees, Resistants and Patriots and the Ligue des droits de l'homme filed a complaint against Bousquet for crimes against humanity for the deportation of 194 children from six departments of southern France. After eight years of investigation and numerous delay tactics, Bousquet was indicted by the national government in 1991. In August 1992, Bousquet wrote a 60 page letter in his defence to the Paris Court of Appeals that made a number of false claims that have been refuted by historians. By 1995, only four senior French Vichy officials had been indicted for war crimes, and, only Paul Touvier had yet stood trial. The former Vichy official Maurice Papon was convicted of war crimes in 1998.

On 8 June 1993, a few weeks before his trial was scheduled to open, Bousquet was shot dead at his apartment at 34 Avenue Raphaël in Paris by the 49-year-old Christian Didier, who was accused of murder and pleaded not guilty, as he claimed the killing was justified by Bousquet's wartime crimes. With a history of pursuing former Vichy officials, Didier held a press conference to announce his killing of a "monster". He was defended by Thierry Lévy and Arnaud Montebourg. Didier was ruled sane although the court heard testimony about his mental problems and was convicted and sentenced to ten years in prison. Had the trial against Bousquet proceeded, it would have been the first against a French citizen for crimes against humanity, and it would also have served as a "trial of the Vichy regime", according to The Independent.

== See also ==
- Round up of Marseille (22–24 January 1943)

== Bibliography ==
- Mark Celinscak, "René Bousquet" in Atrocities, Massacres, and War Crimes: An Encyclopedia. Edited by A. Mikaberidze (Santa Barbara: ABC-CLIO, 2013), pp. 72–73.
- Pascale Froment, René Bousquet, Fayard, 2001
- Simon Kitson, 'The Marseille Police in their context from Popular Front to Liberation', D Phil thesis, University of Sussex, 1995
- Max Lagarrigue, 99 questions sur...les Français pendant l'Occupation, Montpellier, CNDP, 2006. see also Irénée Bonnafous and Revue Arkheia
