= Évelyne Baylet =

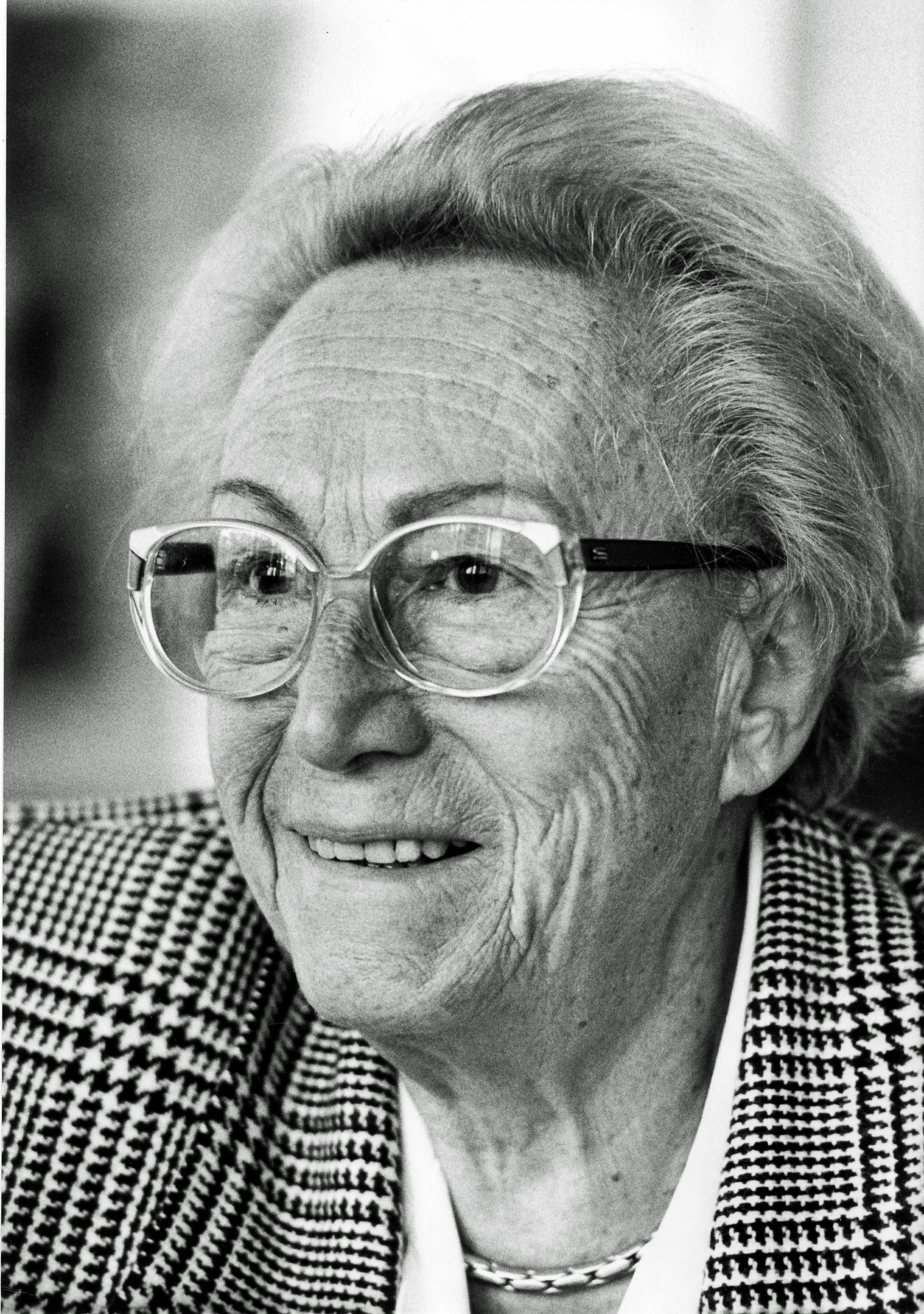

President of the General Council of Tarn-et-Garonne
- In office 1970–1982

Mayor of Valence-d'Agen
- In office 1959–1977
- Preceded by: Jean Baylet
- Succeeded by: Jean-Michel Baylet

Personal details
- Born: Évelyne Isaac; 14 June 1913 Batna, Algeria
- Died: 6 November 2014 (aged 101) Toulouse, France
- Party: Radical Party of the Left
- Spouse: Jean Baylet
- Children: Jean-Michel Baylet
- Education: University of Algiers

Évelyne Baylet (born Évelyne Isaac: 14 June 1913 - 6 November 2014) was a French company director. She served between 1959 and 1995 as president of the La Dépêche du Midi newspaper group, while pursuing a parallel career as a regional politician.

In 1970 she became president of the departmental council for Tarn-et-Garonne, which is a department in the southwest of France. Membership of departmental councils had been based on universal male suffrage since 1848, and on universal adult suffrage since 1944, but it was only in 1970 that Évelyne Baylet became the first president of any departmental council in France who was also a woman.

== Life ==
=== Provenance and early years ===
Évelyne Isaac and her twin brother were born into a Jewish family in Batna, a substantial inland city in northeastern Algeria. Her grandparents had moved across from Alsace after 1871. Maurice Simon Isaac (1882-), her father, was a Corps des mines member. Her mother was a school teacher. She pursued her studies at the girl's lycée at Constantine, and then at the University of Algiers from which she successfully graduated (with so-called "Khâgne" and "Hypokhâgne" pre-university degree qualifications). Between 1937 and 1940 she taught French, Latin and Greek at a girls' school in Bône.

=== Marriage and war years ===
On 30 December 1940 Évelyne Isaac married Jean Baylet (1904-1959), a Radical Party politician and director of the Dépêche de Toulouse (regional newspaper). They had met while Évelyne was accompanying her mother who was undergoing a cure at Ax-les-Thermes. The ceremony took place in Jean Baylet's home town, Valence-d'Agen. The marriage would produce three recorded children including the politician-journalist Jean-Michel Baylet. By 2014 there were also seven grandchildren and six great grandchildren.

In September 1939 Germany and the Soviet Union invaded Poland. France reacted (along with Britain) by declaring war on Germany. Eight months later, in May 1940, Germany invaded France: by the end of July 1940 a puppet government, based in Vichy, was administering approximately the southern half of France (including Toulouse). In 1943 Joseph Lécussan, a senior Vichy official, launched an enquiry in the region on behalf of the "Commissariat général" into the "Jewish question". Évelyne Baylet hastened to disappear, changing her name to Eliane Bories.

Liberation came in June 1944 and ushered in a period of fevered recrimination. The Dépêche de Toulouse faced a ban and its premises were sequestrated because, during the German occupation, the newspaper had been taken over by "collaborateurs" and published. Jean Baylet had been elected as mayor of Valence-d'Agen in 1930 and remained in office throughout (and long after) the Vichy years, but he had taken care, if quietly, to distance himself from the collaborationist authorities, refusing to hang the portrait of Marshal Pétain on his office wall at the town hall. Any residual suspicions that he was too close to the Germans were helpfully undermined on 9 June 1944, very shortly before liberation, by the Gestapo who suspected him of helping the Résistance and arrested him.

=== Aftermath of Vichy ===
Starting in 1944, Jean and Évelyne Baylet spent two years assembling evidence of their "Résistance credentials" and submitting applications to have the newspaper business returned to the family. With the need for secrecy gone, there was abundance evidence available from numerous well placed witnesses of the extent of the practical help Jean Baylet had given to those opposing the German occupation. In 1946 they obtained the necessary "ordonnance de non-lieu", confirming that they were not to be pursued as suspected "Vichy collaborators". The times were uncertain and lawless, however, and the Bayets were still prevented from returning to the newspaper offices. On 24 October 1947 Jean Baylet turned up at the newspaper's Toulouse offices accompanied by the rugby team from nearby Valence-d'Agen. By this time it was six months since a court had formally restored the newspaper to him, but the individuals occupying the offices had turned a deaf ear to the court. Now, however, they were persuaded to depart. At the same time, the newspaper's Paris office was recovered. Évelyne Baylet had already spent a considerable amount of time in Paris, pleading with officials at all the government ministries that might be persuaded to show support, but this had failed to achieve a result. She therefore turned up early at the newspaper's offices in the prestigious Rue du Faubourg-Montmartre, accompanied by Maurice Bourgès-Maunoury. Later, in 1957, Bourgès-Maunoury would serve (briefly) as Prime Minister of France, but in 1947 he was merely an ambitious young opposition politician and, importantly, a witness of what happened next. The two of them installed themselves in the best arm chairs, to await the arrival of the "new master" of the place. When he arrived and asked what they were doing there, they explained they were doing the same as he was: "occupying the place". The ensuing conversation, as reported, was brief and to the point. The Paris offices were recovered. The newspaper returned to the streets in its southwest heartland on 22 November 1947, now renamed La Dépêche du Midi. During the next twelve years the newspaper recovered its authority and its political "king-maker" status in the region defined approximately by a circle with a radius of approximately 100 kilometers surrounding Toulouse.

=== The young widow ===
Jean Baylet died relatively young, in a motor accident: he collided at high speed with a tree after a motor cyclist cut across his path, on 29 May 1959, The next day his widow appeared at the printing plant and told the assembled employees "I am going to take over the direction of this newspaper" ("Je vais assumer la direction de ce journal"). She had little obvious relevant experience, while legally 76% of the ownership of the business passed directly to her teenage children. But, as she later explained, she thought she was "best places to look after the interests of the newspaper", and over the next forty years that is what she did. In order to anticipate any who doubted her intentions, she joined her late husband's name to her own. Mme Évelyne Baylet became Mme Évelyne-Jean Baylet.

=== Politics ===
She also assumed her husband's political mantle. Jean Baylet had served as mayor of Valence-d'Agen since 1930. Évelyne-Jean Baylet succeeded him between 1959 and 1977, after which the position passed to the couple's son, Jean-Michel Baylet. There was nothing seamless about that succession, however. It involved a fierce contest that ended up in a court case. Jean-Michel Baylet's rival for the mayoral office in 1977 was Danièle Malet-Baylet, his elder sister. As mayor from 1959 Évelyne-Jean Baylet also followed her late husband in representing Valence-d'Agen as conseiller général at the departmental level. She sat as a member of the Radical Party, switching after 1973 to the newly relaunched Radical Party of the Left ("Mouvement des Radicaux de Gauche" / MRG). Ten years after taking over her husband's place on the Departmental council for Tarn-et-Garonne, in 1970 Évelyne-Jean Baylet took over as council president, the first woman to take on such a position anywhere in France.

=== Final years ===
In 2012, now aged 99, Évelyne-Jean Baylet retired from her most enduring position, being her directorship of the La Dépêche du Midi newspaper group. Her place was taken by Jean-Nicolas Baylet, her grandson. She died just over two years later.

== Awards and honours ==
- Commander of the Legion of Honour
- Officer of the National Order of Merite
- Commander of the Order of Academic Palms
- Chevalier of the Order of Agricultural Merit
