= Christian Didier =

Killer of René Bousquet

- Born: 11 February 1944; Saint-Dié-des-Vosges, Occupied France
- Died: 14 May 2015 (aged 71); Saint-Dié-des-Vosges, France
- Motive: Vigilantism
- Conviction: Murder
- Penalty: 10 years imprisonment

Details
- Victims: René Bousquet, 84
- Date: 8 June 1993

Christian Didier (French pronunciation: [kʁistjɑ̃ didje]; 11 February 1944 – 14 May 2015) came to public attention after 8 June 1993 as the assassin of René Bousquet, who had served as a senior police official under Vichy France, which administered the southern half of France during the German occupation. Directly after the killing, Didier telephoned a succession of newspaper editors in order to organise an ad hoc press conference, meaning that the police had no difficulty in locating him.

In 2013, Didier unsuccessfully sued Alain Minc for defamation after the author, in a biographical book on Bousquet, described Didier as fou ("crazy", "mad").

== Biography ==
=== Provenance and early years ===
Christian Didier was born at Saint Dié, then a small and relatively isolated industrial town in the Vosges foothills to the south-east of Nancy. His father is described in sources as an "artisan hairdresser", with whom he was frequently involved in violent conflict. Despite more than one attempt, he never passed his school final exams. Later, testifying at his trial in 1995, Marie-Thérèse Didier, his mother, described a troubled childhood and youth, characterised by failure at school, rejection by girls and possible employers, and suicidal concerns. But there was also a determination to reject what he perceived as wrong-doing: "Il ne supportait pas le mal, tout ça le bouleversait" (loosely, "He couldn't stand wrong-doing: all that stuff upset him").

After leaving school, a succession of brief stints at several jobs followed, including as a metallurgist, internships supervisor, locksmith, archivist and delivery driver. He spent some time outside France, traveling to Norway, Sweden, Australia and even, during the "beat generation years", California. He was committed to psychiatric hospitals, due to his mental health issues.

=== Chauffeur to the stars ===
Between 1974 and 1983 he held a driving job, working as a chauffeur for a number of high-profile celebrities. Based in Paris, he rubbed shoulders with stars such as Salvador Dalí, Charlie Chaplin, Richard Burton, David Bowie, Catherine Deneuve and Romy Schneider. He then had to give up the job for health reasons. He developed serious bladder problems and was obliged to undergo several serious operations. In 1983, Didier returned to live with his mother in Saint-Dié.

=== Author ===
Back home, he read a lot. By this time, Didier had also embarked on a career of sorts as an author. However, he was for a long time unable to find a publisher for any of the three books that he had written. One of his manuscripts found its way to the desk of Simone de Beauvoir who wrote back a note, "I don't like your book at all: metaphysical jargon" ("Je n’aime pas du tout votre livre, du jargon métaphysique"). In May 1985, he nevertheless published one of his books, "La Balade d'Early Bird", at his own expense.

=== Publicity ===
An early publicity stunt involved walking the 300 miles from Paris to Strasbourg in 1980 with an unpublished book of memoires concerning his travels in Australia under one arm. Still keen to promote his book, during the later 1980s he made several bizarre television appearances, drawing attention to himself in studio chat shows by bursting in front of the cameras and making one of his increasingly familiar "Achetez mon livre!" ("Buy my book") announcements, before being bundled out by security officials. On one occasion, he inserted himself into a broadcast of the "César Awards", and on another interrupted the transmission of an international football match by displaying a banner. His media appearances tended to end in visits to a police station and, increasingly, assessment visits to psychiatric clinics. Nevertheless, in 1989, he was rewarded with an invitation to appear on TF1, France's leading television channel, in a programme devoted to "those whom the telly makes mad" ("... ceux que la télé rend fous").

Eventually, however, Didier began to appreciate that he was not being taken seriously. He even doubted his own talent as an author. The conviction that success equated with fame remained undimmed, however, and he became increasingly attracted by the role of "universal citizen and justice giver for moral order" ("citoyen universel, justicier de l'ordre moral"). Another term that comes up in connection with Didier's self-appointed mission around this time is "avenger of the Jews" ("vengeur de juifs").

=== Klaus Barbie ===
On 19 May 1987, Christian Didier was arrested while trying to gain admission to the Prison Saint-Paul in Lyon: he was in possession of a revolver and had prepared false papers identifying him as a qualified doctor, to persuade the prison authorities to give him access to Barbie. His intention was to confront Klaus Barbie, the city's reviled wartime Gestapo boss. Barbie was much in the news at the time because his trial, for an exceptional range of alleged wartime atrocities, was due to start the next week. Didier was arrested after the revolver in his bag set off an alarm at the prison entrance. Didier was tried, found guilty and sentenced, for illegal possession of a firearm, to four months in prison, after which he was referred for further psychiatric treatment, then returned to his mother's modest apartment in Saint-Dié. Didier explained that he had never wanted to kill Barbie: "I just wanted to shoot him in the legs while calling out, 'that's your greeting from Jean Moulin!'" ("Je ne voulais pas le tuer, simplement lui tirer dans les jambes en lui criant: 't’as le bonjour de Jean Moulin!'"). (Jean Moulin was a high-profile résistance hero for whose torture and death – officially a suicide – Klaus Barbie was widely blamed.) Subsequent commentators – albeit in most cases only after the killing of René Bousquet six years later – have said the court should have taken Didier's actions at the Prison Saint-Paul much more seriously.

In September 1989, Didier broke in to gardens at the Élysée Palace. Security personnel overpowered him. He explained the action by saying that he had wanted to deliver a dossier concerning the wartime hero Raoul Wallenberg to President Mitterrand. This time he was automatically transferred to a psychiatric hospital where he spent six weeks and received a diagnosis – subsequently questioned – of "sensitive paranoid psychosis" ("psychose paranoïaque sensitive"). After his discharge, he conceived a project to assassinate Paul Touvier, another suspected (and subsequently convicted) Nazi war criminal who had served as an intelligence chief during the war and was in the headlines during 1989, having recently been located and arrested by the police. Didier's plan could not be implemented, however, since he was unable to find out where Touvier was being held.

=== René Bousquet ===
It was now that Didier selected a new target: René Bousquet, the collaborationist police chief in the Pétain government. Bousquet was (and despite never having been tried and convicted, still is) widely thought to have been the principal organiser of the "Vel' d'Hiv Roundup", the "26 August 1942 Roundup" six weeks later, the "Marseilles Roundup" of January 1943 and of other actions supporting the elimination of Jews in occupied Europe. On the morning of 8 June 1993, Cristian Didier lit a candle to Saint Joan of Arc. He then made his way to the apartment bloc in which Bousquet had his Paris home on the Avenue Raphaël in the 16th arrondissement. Bousquet at this time was under criminal investigation in connection with his wartime activities: according to at least one source he faced "imminent trial for crimes against humanity". Didier explained that he was a document courier with papers from the Interior Ministry that urgently needed to be delivered to Bousquet, thereby gaining admittance to the building. He now continued up to Bousquet's apartment on the sixth floor. Bousquet opened the door himself and Didier repeated his explanation that he had documents that needed to be delivered urgently, while reaching into his bag, supposedly for the documents. However, instead of documents, Didier took out a revolver, with which he shot Bousquet with four or five bullets (sources differ), killing him. He later explained that he had to use four bullets because the first couple of shots did nothing to stop Bousquet, who was now advancing on him, trying to hit him, and swearing at him. He had been afraid that Bousquet's German Shepherd would attack him, but the dog fled after the first shot.

The deed having been done, he walked to the nearest Metro station and made his way across the city to Les Lilas, where he had booked a room in the Hotel Paul-de-Koch, a small and somewhat run down establishment. Now he started telephoning the media. "I'm the one who's killed this piece of shit. I have a message for you" (" C'est moi qui ai tué cette ordure, j'ai un message à vous délivrer.") Journalists from Le Monde and Le Parisien were among the first to arrive, followed by representatives from Libération, Television France 1 and Radio Monte Carlo. He also called Television France 2, but the secretaries taking his call decided he was a fantasist and refused to connect him to the news desk. Wearing worn jeans and a polo shirt, Didier addressed the assembled journalists for more than an hour. "Eliminating a monster is an honorable thing to do: it's the victory of good over evil" ("... éliminer un monstre est honorable, c'est la victoire du bien sur le mal."). He went on to provide an eerily detailed and factual account of the killing he had committed a couple of hours earlier. After preparing a report for the midday news, a television reporter called the police in order to try and corroborate Didier's story. When they arrived, one of them observed that Didier seemed angry. Didier told the police (with journalists still present) that his health and intellectual faculties had recently deteriorated, and that he had thought the time had come to deliver a spiritual message to the western world, in order to give a sense of purpose to his life.

Between 7 and 13 November 1995, he was tried by the Court of Assizes in Paris. He was defended by Thierry Lévy and Arnaud Montebourg, two politically committed lawyers with a passionate awareness of the broader historical background of the case, though after sentence was passed, Lévy volunteered that the two of them had, perhaps, not been the best team to defend their client. Didier was sentenced to ten years of criminal detention. The court heard Didier's defence lawyers arguing that the killing of René Bousquet by Christian Didier represented a response to the failings of the French justice system. There were times when the trial seemed to be turning into a trial not of Didier but of Bousquet. Didier's own testimony alternated between cool lucidity and a series of repetitive and barely coherent mystical allusions to a "divine mission", "visions in the forest" and "voices". There were also times when he appeared deeply and genuinely contrite.

=== Final years ===
After six years and eight months behind bars, Didier was released early, "for good conduct", on 24 February 2000 from the detention centre at Toul where he had spent much of his sentence. Back in 1993, Didier's trial had attracted extensive press coverage, and following his sentencing a support committee was set up, comprising various "patriots" and those representing wartime deportees to the death camps. The trial of Maurice Papon in 1997/98 generated a renewed media focus on Didier and an intensified campaign for his release. The council of Saint-Dié, his home town, submitted a request for clemency to the Court of Assizes in Paris on his behalf.

Even when he testified at his trial in 1995, Didier had, at times, provided assurances that two years in pre-trial detention had given him time to think and he was "vaccinated for ever against all forms of future crime". He asked God for pardon and God had told him "you shall not kill". He asked forgiveness of the Jews whom he had deprived of a trial [for Bousquet]. After his release he restated his contrition in a newspaper interview. "At that time I was going through deep depression. I thought I was on a divine mission ... to kill René Bousquet and that if I did not do it I would have no right to eternal grace". But now, he said, he was just a "normal bloke" ("un simple quidam"). His media profile could not be completely shaken off, however.

In his well received 2010 debut novel HHhH, Laurent Binet mentioned Didier, identifying him as the "spectaculaire abruti" (loosely, "eye-watering cretin") who had deprived France of the "trial of the century".

In 2013, Christian Didier launched a defamation case against the author Alain Minc. In a biographical book on René Bousquet published the previous year, Minc had described Didier as "fou" (loosely, "crazy", "mad"). Didier claimed €10,000 in damages. He said he would donate the money to supporters of Roger McGowen, a death row inmate in Texas. However, Didier had addressed his claim to Etienne Manteaux in Épinal: Manteaux was the public prosecutor for the département. Didier had thereby invoked the criminal law rather than launching a civil claim, and under these circumstances the defendant in the case was the book's publisher, Éditions Grasset. The author was merely an accomplice in respect of any criminal defamation. The court in Épinal nevertheless agreed to hear the case, which it did during the first week of August 2013. In the end Minc was discharged in respect of the defamation allegation. (In respect of a slightly earlier legal case triggered by the same book, the author Alain Minc fared less well: when the plagiarism case launched by the Paris author Pascale Froment came to trial it was determined that Minc should pay Froment damages of €5,000, along with a contribution to court costs of €6,000.)

Didier's final written piece, a short autobiographical volume entitled Fugaces traits de plume… en roue libre! was completed in 2014. It appears never to have been published, albeit there are mentions of it having at one stage been accessible online. He gave his final press interview in April 2015, still concerned to obtain some form of public rehabilitation.

Christian Didier died at Saint-Dié on 14 May 2015.
