= Chantal Nobel =

French actress (1948–2026)

- Born: Chantal Bonneau; 23 November 1948; Rouen, Seine-Maritime, France
- Died: 30 April 2026 (aged 77); Ramatuelle, France
- Occupation: Actress
- Years active: 1969–1985
- Notable credit: Châteauvallon

Chantal Nobel (born Chantal Bonneau, 23 November 1948 – 30 April 2026) was a French actress.

== Early life and career ==
Nobel was mostly known for having played the lead female role of Florence Berg in the successful French television series Châteauvallon. After having participated at the Dakar Rally with Georges Groine, her career ended suddenly on 28 April 1985. After the broadcast of an episode of the television program Champs-Élysées, she was victim of a serious automobile accident involving a car driven by the singer Sacha Distel, during a trip to the village of Maltaverne, a small village outside Tracy-sur-Loire.

After six weeks in a coma, with severe facial injuries and disabled for life, she left the media to go to the South of France, the series Châteauvallon ending at the same time. She filed a lawsuit against Sacha Distel, who was then sentenced to one year in prison for involuntary injuries. During her hospitalization in 1985, three paparazzi entered her hospital room to take pictures of her against her will. The affair was followed with a condemnation of the paparazzi. The jurisprudence of the Court of Appeal of Paris on 17 March 1986, expanded the notion of domicile respect, indicating that the hospital room was considered as the private domicile of the patient during the recovery.

== Personal life and death ==
Chantal Bonneau was born in Rouen in the department of Seine-Maritime, and had an older brother named Jacky. She was married to Jean-Louis Julian, a jeweller at Saint-Tropez and Courchevel, with whom she had one daughter named Anne-Charlotte. She also had from a previous relationship with producer Jacques-Henri Marin another daughter named Alexandra, born in 1971.

Nobel died in Ramatuelle on 30 April 2026, at the age of 77.

== Filmography ==
=== Film ===
- The Black Hand (1968) ... Éléonore
- La Honte de la famille (1969) ... Valérie Maspi
- La Grande Maffia... (1971) ... Mademoiselle Ducœurjoli
- L'Odeur des fauves (1972) ... Marie Fulton
- Le Permis de conduire (1974) ... the bank employee
- Les murs ont des oreilles (1974) ... Claudine
- Opération Lady Marlène (1975) ... Madame de Pharmacy
- L'Année sainte (1976) ... a stewardess
- Le Jour de gloire (1976) ... Mademoiselle Verger
- Te marre pas ... c'est pour rire ! (1982) ... Janine Royer, Marcello's assistant
- Flics de choc (1983) ... Wanda Romanoff
- Les parents ne sont pas simples cette année (1984) ... Alexandra Labruyère

=== Television ===
- Aurore et Victorien (1974) ... Aurore's older sister
- La Lumière des justes (1979) ... Sophie de Champlitte / Sophie de Lambrefoux / Sophie Ozareff
- Salut champion (1981) ... Juliette Majoureau
- Châteauvallon (1985) ... Florence Berg
