= Colette Régis =

French actress (1893–1978)

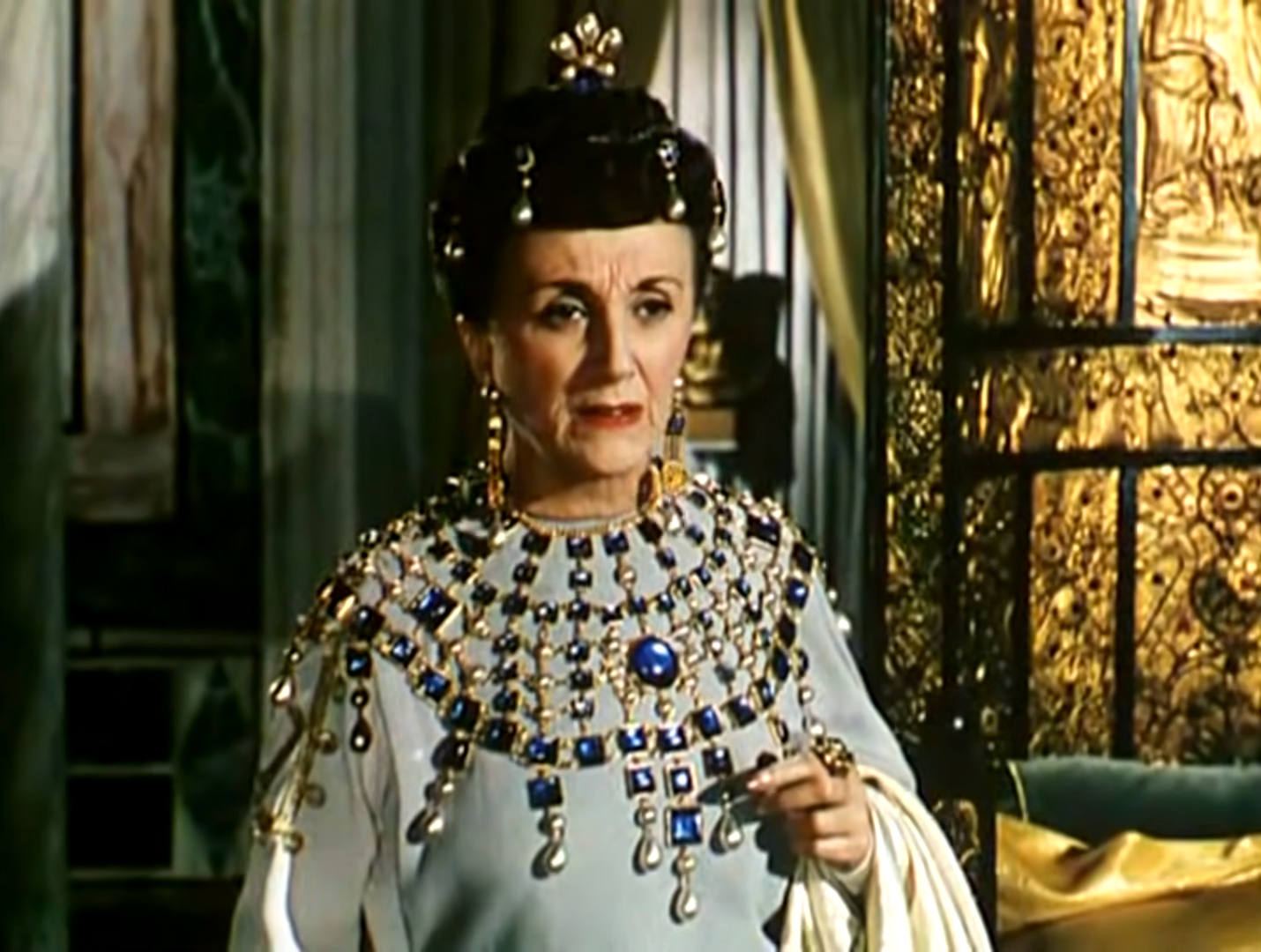
- Régis as Galla Placidia in Attila
- Born: 23 October 1893; Brive-la-Gaillarde, Corrèze, France
- Died: 23 October 1978 (aged 85); Paris, France
- Other name: Yvonne Artigues
- Occupation: Actress
- Years active: 1938-1974 (film)

Colette Régis (1893–1978) was a French film actress.

== Selected filmography ==
- Rasputin (1938) - Une religieuse (uncredited)
- Three Waltzes (1938) - Sarah Bernhardt
- La Bête Humaine (1938) - Victoire Pecqueux
- Three from St Cyr (1939) - Mme Mercier
- Sarajevo (1940) - L'archiduchesse Isabelle
- Volpone (1941) - La marquise
- Ne bougez plus (1941) - Une cliente de la photo
- The Chain Breaker (1941) - Mme Ferdinand
- Caprices (1942) - La vieille dame
- Mademoiselle Swing (1942) - La dame de l'association
- Eight Men in a Castle (1942) - La comtesse de Chanceau
- Picpus (1943) - Madame Le Cloaguen
- La Main du diable (1943) - Madame Duval (uncredited)
- Le secret de Madame Clapain (1943) - Une dame
- Le val d'enfer (1943) - La religieuse
- Martin Roumagnac (1946) - Madame Rimbaut - la femme de l'adjoint au maire
- La kermesse rouge (1947) - La duchesse d'Alençon
- Mirror (1947) - La marquise
- The Great Maguet (1947) - Béatrice Arnold
- Tous les deux (1949)
- Scandal on the Champs-Élysées (1949) - Suzanne
- Rendezvous in July (1949)
- Mademoiselle de la Ferté (1949) - Madame de Saint-Selve
- Monseigneur (1949) - La comtesse (uncredited)
- Justice Is Done (1950) - Hortense - la mère de Lucie
- The Glass Castle (1950) - La tenancière de l'hôtel
- Without Leaving an Address (1951) - La cliente en bagarre
- Darling Caroline (1951) - La marquise de Bièvre
- Under the Sky of Paris (1951) - L'infirmière-chef
- Sweet Madness (1951)
- The Night Is My Kingdom (1951) - Mme Turgot
- The Prettiest Sin in the World (1951) - Mme Lebreton
- Une histoire d'amour (1951) - Une invitée (uncredited)
- Trois vieilles filles en folie (1952) - Amélie
- Adorable Creatures (1952) - The Marquise (uncredited)
- Drôle de noce (1952)
- Buridan, héros de la tour de Nesle (1952) - Mabelle
- Imperial Violets (1952) - Mme de Montijo
- When You Read This Letter (1953) - La supérieure
- The Earrings of Madame de… (1953) - Vendeuse de cierges (uncredited)
- Le Guérisseur (1953) - Louise Mériadec
- It's the Paris Life (1954) - La comtesse
- The Congress of Mother-in-Laws (1954)
- Attila (1954) - Galla Placidia
- Le secret de soeur Angèle (1956) - La mère
- The Bride Is Much Too Beautiful (1956) - Aunt Yvonne
- I'll Get Back to Kandara (1956) - Madame Bergamier - la belle-mère
- Ramuntcho (1959) - La supériere
- La bête à l'affût (1959) - Une amie d'Elisabeth
- Seven Days... Seven Nights (1960) - Miss Giraud
- The Night of Suspects (1960) - Mammy
- Tomorrow Is My Turn (1960) - La mère d'Alice / Baker's Wife
- The Gigolo (1960) - L'infirmière
- The Truth (1960) - La logeuse de Gilbert
- Par-dessus le mur (1961)
- L'assassin est dans l'annuaire (1961) - (uncredited)
- Les Abysses (1963) - Mme. Lapeyre
- Three Girls in Paris (1963)
- La bonne soupe (1964) - La dame de la Croix-rouge (uncredited)
- Dandelions by the Roots (1964) - Christine
- Les amitiés particulières (1964) - La religieuse (uncredited)
- The Vampire of Düsseldorf (1965) - La patronne du cabaret
- Pas de caviar pour tante Olga (1965)
- Five Wild Kids (1966) - Tante Marthe
- Salut Berthe! (1968) - Une cliente de l'hôtel (uncredited)
- The Black Hand (1968) - La gouvernante
- Goto, Island of Love (1969) - La directrice
- Ballade pour un chien (1969)
- The Mad Heart (1970)
- Le petit matin (1971) - La grand-mère
- Faire l'amour : De la pilule à l'ordinateur (1971)

== Bibliography ==
- Hayward, Susan. French Costume Drama of the 1950s: Fashioning Politics in Film. Intellect Books, 2010.
