= Jean Davy =

- Born: 15 October 1911; Puteaux, Île-de-France, France
- Died: 5 February 2001 (aged 89); Paris, Île-de-France, France
- Occupation: Actor
- Spouse: Odile Mallet

Jean Davy (15 October 1911 – 5 February 2001) was a French film, stage voice actor.

== Career ==
He was a Sociétaire of the Comédie-Française.

In the premiere production of Antigone in Paris, 1944, Davy created the role of Créon.

He was a French voice of Charlton Heston (The Ten Commandments, The Three Musketeers, The Four Musketeers...), Errol Flynn, Orson Welles and Robert Taylor.

== Filmography ==
- The Crew (1935)
- Mayerling (1936)
- Sirocco (1938)
- Remontons les Champs-Élysées (1938)
- The Man Who Played with Fire (1942)
- Le Destin fabuleux de Désirée Clary (1942)
- Une étoile au soleil (1943)
- La Main du diable (1943)
- Mon amour est près de toi (1943)
- First on the Rope (1944)
- Farandole (1945)
- Le mystère Saint-Val (1945)
- The Last Judgment (1945)
- Alone in the Night (1945)
- Special Mission (1946)
- Criminal Brigade (1947)
- Vertigo (1947)
- The Great Maguet (1947)
- Une mort sans importance (1948)
- Judicial Error (1948)
- Le Destin exécrable de Guillemette Babin (1948)
- La louve (1949)
- The Nude Woman (1949)
- The Sinners (1949)
- On ne triche pas avec la vie (1949)
- Cartouche, roi de Paris (1950)
- Souvenirs perdus (1950)
- The Real Culprit (1951)
- Sainte Jeanne (1956) (TV)
- C'était un gentleman (1957) (TV)
- Christine (1958)
- Drôles de phénomènes (1959)
- Le juge de Malte (1959) (TV)
- Le Masque de fer (1962)
- La princesse du rail (1967) (TV series)
- La bouquetière des innocents (1967) (TV)
- Le profanateur (1969) (TV)
- Tête d'horloge (1970) (TV)
- Noëlle aux quatre vents (TV series)
- La Polonaise (1971)
- Le complot (1973)
- Eugène Sue (1974) (TV)
- Stavisky (1974)
- Julie Charles (1974)
- Un jeune homme seul (1974)
- L'homme au contrat (1974) (TV series)
- Ces grappes de ma vigne (1975) (miniseries)
- Faux et usage de faux (1976) (TV series)
- Les jeunes filles (1977) (TV)
- Le diable dans la boîte (1977)
- Foch pour vaincre (1977) (TV)
- La lettre écarlate (1977) (TV)
- Il était un musicien (1978) (TV series)
- Zigzags (1978) (TV)
- Othello (1979) (TV)
- Le destin de Priscilla Davies (1979) (TV)
- La lumière des justes (1979) (miniseries)
- Les yeux bleus (1979) (miniseries)
- Bernard Quesnay (1979) (TV)
- Le mandarin (1980) (TV)
- La fraîcheur de l'aube (1980) (TV)
- L'inconnue d'Arras (1980) (TV)
- La provinciale (1981)
- Anthelme Collet ou Le brigand gentillhomme (1981) (miniseries)
- Histoire contemporaine (1981) (miniseries)
- Ursule Mirouët (1981) (TV)
- Le procès de Shamgorod (1982) (TV)
- Deux amies d'enfance (1983) (miniseries)
- Dessin sur un trottoir (1983) (TV)
- L'homme de Suez (1983) (miniseries)
- Les maîtres du soleil (1984)
- Au théâtre ce soir (1984) (TV)
- Châteauvallon (1985) (TV)
