= Jean Topart =

French actor (1922-2012)

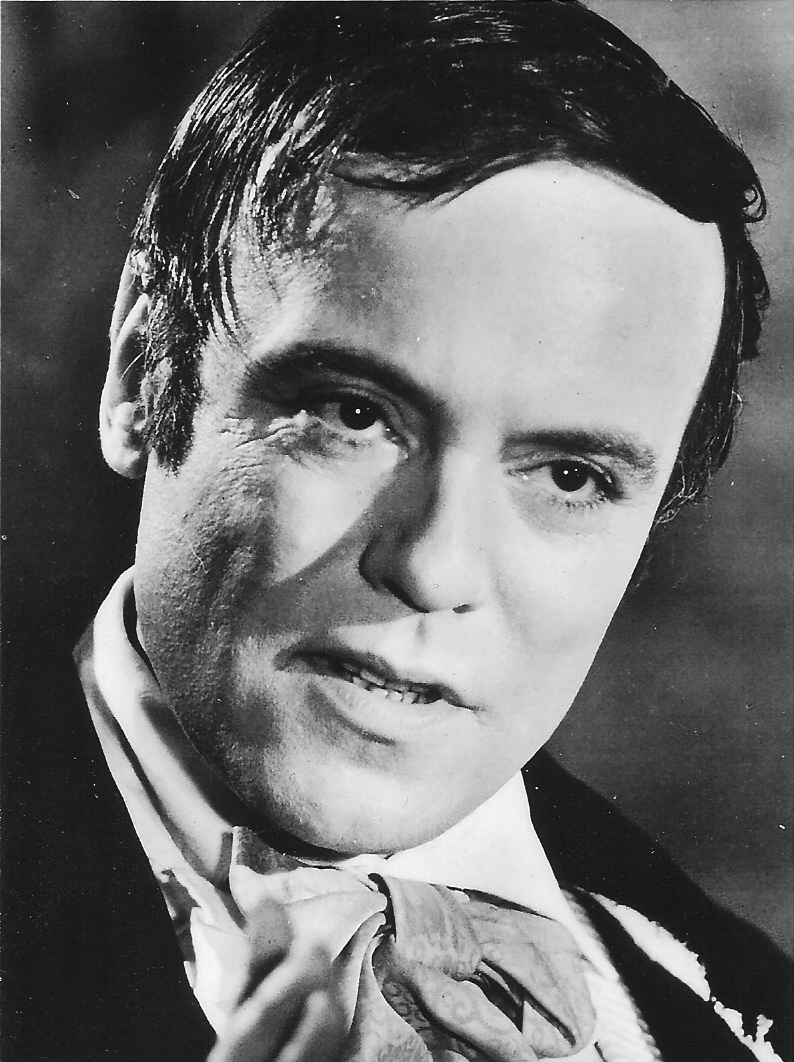
Jean Topart.

Jean Topart (13 April 1922 – 29 December 2012) was a French actor. He was considered one of the best known voices on French television for decades. In addition to providing the voices and narration for television series and animated films, Topart often dubbed American and other foreign films into French.

Topart was born in Paris, on 13 April 1922. His sister, actress Lise Topart, died in a plane crash in Nice, France, on 3 March 1952.

In 1973, Topart starred in the French science fiction animated film, Fantastic Planet, which was directed by René Laloux. Best known for his voice work, Topart co-starred in the 1981 Franco-Japanese animated television series, Ulysses 31, and The Mysterious Cities of Gold in 1982. He narrated the 2000 French animated series, Argai: The Prophecy.

Topart was cast in the French version of numerous foreign language films, including DuckTales the Movie: Treasure of the Lost Lamp for Disney in 1990. He was cast as narrator for the French-language release of the 2002 Walt Disney Animation Studios film, Treasure Planet, known as La Planète au trésor, un nouvel univers in French. Topart also dubbed the French-language voices for many foreign live-action films, including The Elephant Man in 1980, Birdy in 1984, and Amadeus in 1984.

Outside of animation, Topart was a member of the Théâtre national populaire (TNP), a French theater troupe, from 1950 to 1960 before entering film and television. His live-action film credits included Angélique, Marquise des Anges by Bernard Borderie in 1964 and Claude Chabrol's Chicken with Vinegar in 1985. His last on-screen film was the 2000 comedy, Les Acteurs, directed by Bertrand Blier.

Topart died in Le Port-Marly, Yvelines department, France, on 29 December 2012, at the age of 90. He was survived by his two daughters and five grandchildren. French Minister of Culture Aurélie Filippetti released a statement following Topart's death calling him, "one of the inimitable voices of French cinema."

== Filmography ==
Year	Title	Role	Notes
1949	Le Sorcier du ciel	Paul Malray adulte	
1958	Les Misérables	Récitant / Narrator	Voice
1962	Le Combat dans l'île	Récitant	Voice, Uncredited
1962	Le Chevalier de Pardaillan	Le duc Henri de Guise	
1964	Hardi Pardaillan!	Le duc Henri de Guise	
1964	Angélique, Marquise des Anges	Maître Bourié - le chef de l'accusation	
1966	Trap for the Assassin	Luversan	
1966	Black Sun	Bayard	
1967	Action Man	Monsieur Henri	
1968	Coplan Saves His Skin	Lieutenant Sakki	
1968	The Black Hand	Zanror	
1969	Maldonne	Frank Herman	
1970	Cold Sweat	Katanga	
1972	Justine de Sade	Récitant / Narrator	Voice
1972	Bonaparte et la révolution	Récitant / Narrator	Voice
1973	Fantastic Planet	Master Sinh	Voice
1974	Dis-moi que tu m'aimes		
1975	Speak to Me of Love	Le quinquagénaire	
1976	Monsieur Klein	La voix du speaker	Voice, Uncredited
1981	La puce et le privé	Nicolas Octave Marcellin, le pharmacien	
1985	Chicken with Vinegar	Docteur Philippe Morasseau	
2000	Actors	Le cinéaste manière 'Jean-Pierre Melville'	
2006	The Serpent	Récitant du documentaire animalier à la télévision	Uncredited, (final film role)
