= Marseille roundup =

Systematic deportation of the Jews of Marseille in 1943

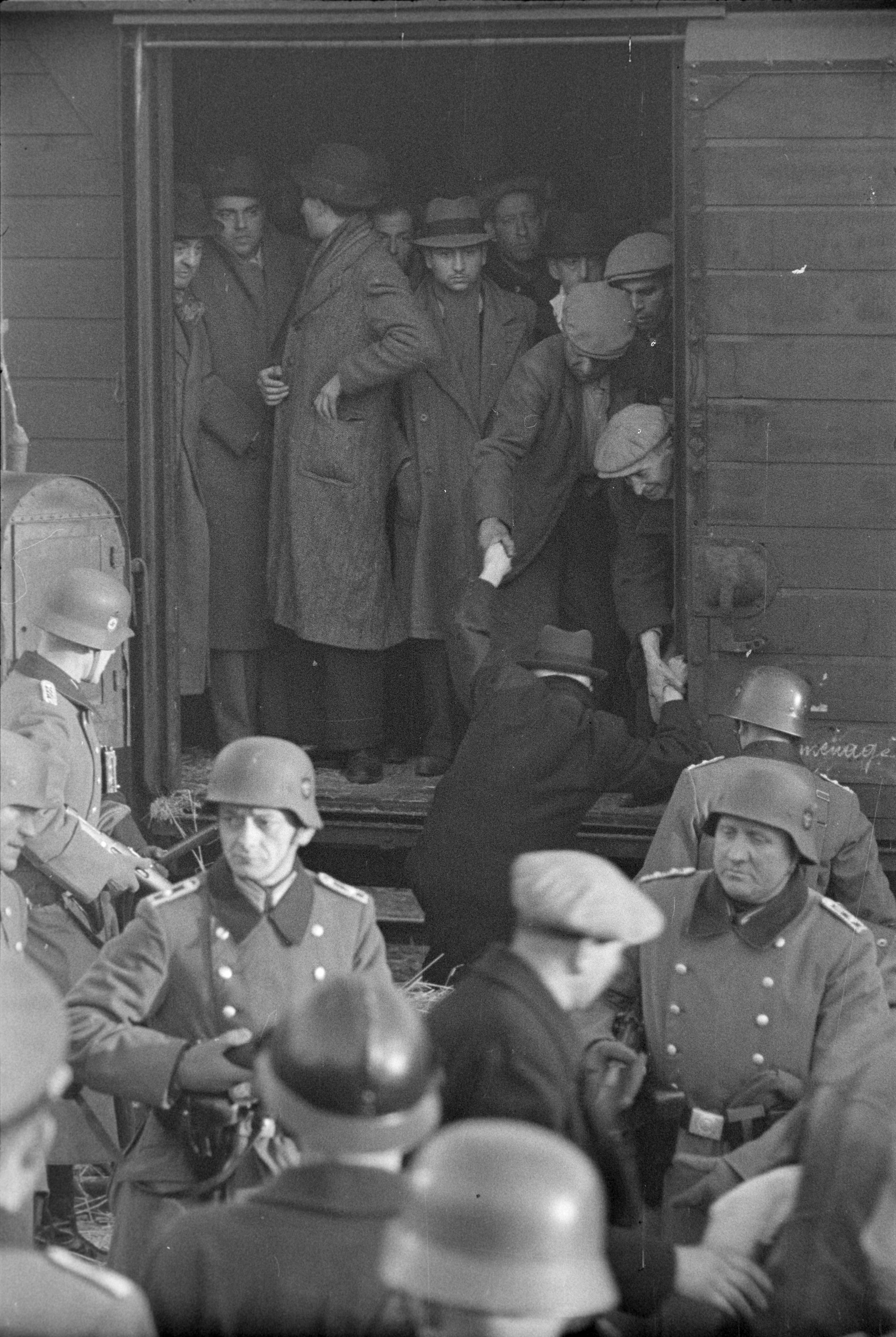
- Jews boarding the Holocaust train for deportation during the roundup
- Native name: Rafle de Marseille
- English name: Marseille roundup
- Date: January 22–24, 1943
- Venue: Old Port of Marseille
- Location: Marseille
- Also known as: Rafle du Vieux-Port
- Organised by: Nazi Germany; Vichy France
- Participants: 30,000 Gestapo and French police
- Outcome: 1,642 deported
- Displaced: 20,000
- Arrests: 6,000

The Marseille roundup (French: Rafle de Marseille) was the systematic deportation of the Jews of Marseille in the Old Port between 22 and 24 January 1943 under the Vichy regime during the German occupation of France. Assisted by the French police, directed by René Bousquet, the Germans organized a raid to arrest Jews. The police checked the identity documents of 40,000 people, and the operation sent 2,000 Jews first to Fréjus, then to the camp of Royallieu near Compiègne, in the Northern Zone of France, and then to Drancy internment camp, last stop before the extermination camps. The operation also encompassed the expulsion of an entire neighborhood (30,000 persons) before its destruction. Located in the Old Port, the 1st arrondissement was considered by the Germans to be a "terrorist nest" because of its small, windy and curvy streets For this occasion, SS leader Carl Oberg, in charge of the German Police in France, made the trip from Paris, and transmitted to Bousquet orders directly received from Himmler. It is a notable case of the French police's collaboration with the German occupiers.

In 2026, a French court officially declared the Marseille roundup a crime against humanity at the request of the descendants of survivors.

== Destruction of the Old Port ==
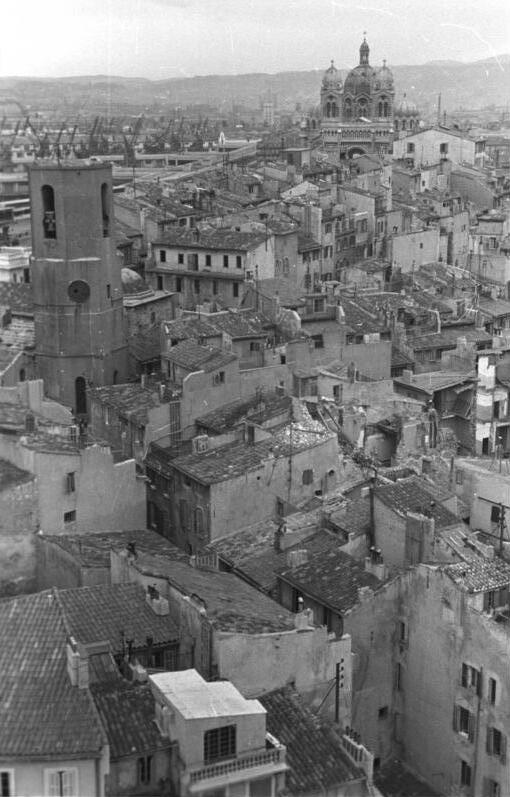
The old neighborhood, seen from the transporter bridge

The operation was intended to reshape the area of the Old Port, a popular neighborhood whose small, curved and winding streets were considered dangerous by the German authorities. The Germans used for this an urbanist plan prepared by French architects who supported the Vichy ideology of "National Revolution" (Révolution nationale). They decided to almost totally destroy the 1st arrondissement of Marseille. At Himmler's order, the population was evacuated to concentration camps in the Northern Zone, in particular at Compiègne. The Old Port itself was searched house by house by the German police, assisted by their French counterparts, and then the buildings were dynamited.

Mandated by the head of Vichy, Pierre Laval, Bousquet demanded on 14 January 1943 that the operation be postponed for a week to improve its organization and have police reinforcements. Furthermore, while the Germans were focussed on the 1st arrondissement of Marseille, Bousquet spontaneously extended the operation to the entire city. According to historian Maurice Rajsfus, he also requested complete freedom of action for the French police, which he obtained from SS Karl Oberg.

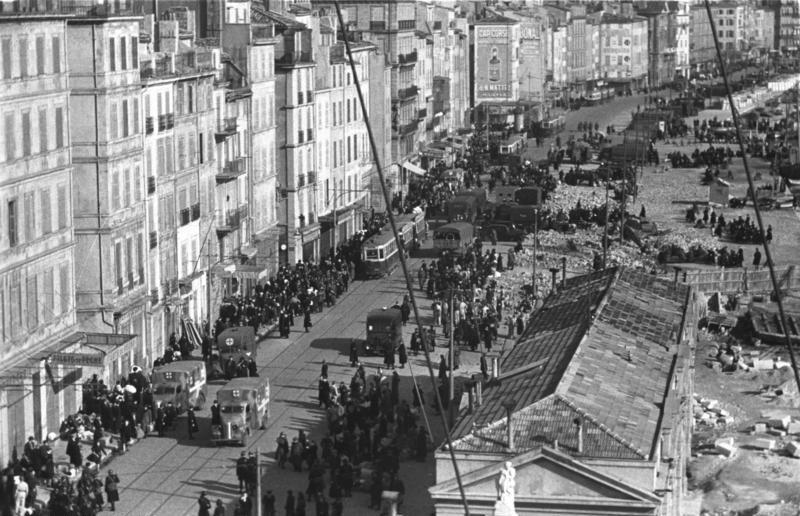
Evacuation of the Old Port

According to historian Jacques Delarue, a witness to the operation, 200 police inspectors from Paris and elsewhere, 15 compagnies of the Groupe mobile de réserve (GMR) and squads of French gendarmes and mobile guards (gardes mobiles) were brought to Marseille for the operation. In total, "approximatively 12,000 police men found themselves concentrated in Marseille.". On 22 January 1943 the Old Port was completely locked down. The city, except for the more wealthy, residential, neighborhoods, was searched house-by-house over a period of 36 hours. "In total, following tens of thousands of checks, nearly 2,000 Marseillese... found themselves in the death trains." wrote historian Maurice Rajsfus. In addition, 1,500 buildings were destroyed.

The Prefecture of the Bouches-du-Rhône published a public statement on 24 January 1943:

For reasons of military order and to guarantee the safety of the population, the German military authorities officially ordered the French administration to proceed immediately with the evacuation of the north end of the Old Port. For its part, the French administration decided on the grounds of internal security to carry out a vast police operation to rid Marseille of certain elements whose activities posed great risks to the population. The French administration worked hard to avoid mixing up the two operations. Sizeable police forces carried out numerous searches in the quarter. Entire neighbourhoods were surrounded and identity checks were made. More than 6,000 individuals were arrested and 40,000 identities were checked.

The newspaper Le Petit Marseillais of 30 January 1943 added:

Let us be clear that the operations for the evacuation of the Old Port were carried out exclusively by the French police and that they did not give rise to any incidents.

German newspapers also acclaimed the operation. Walther Kiaulehn wrote in the German military newspaper Signal:

In the future, when we shall write the history of Marseilles, we will underline this remarkable feat that by having evacuated the old patrician neighborhood, which had been dishonored by the 20th century, the operation had used French and German policemen, as a group of engineers and physicians.

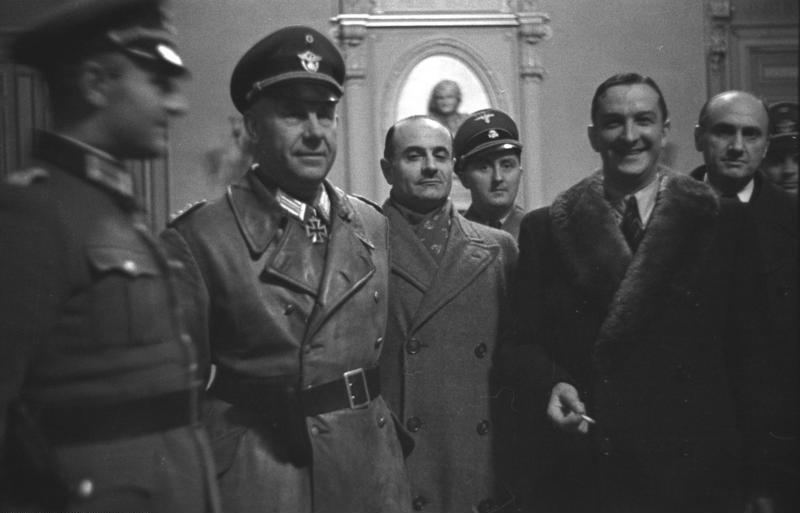
French police head René Bousquet, in fur-trimmed coat, posing with Nazi German officials

A photo taken during this operation, and known since the beginning of the 1980s, shows head of French police René Bousquet posing with regional German police head Bernhard Griese of the SS, a high level officer of Totenkopf, regional prefect Marcel Lemoine, and Pierre Barraud, delegate prefect of Marseille.

While 30,000 were expelled from their neighborhood, people from the criminal underworld, such as Paul Carbone, voluntarily surrendered at the beginning of the week, to be jailed while the "horrible show" took place. Several hundreds of Jews of Marseille, both French and foreign, were first sent to Fréjus, than to the camp of Royallieu near Compiègne, and finally to Drancy internment camp, from where they were sent to the extermination camps. In total, 2,000 Jews were put on the death trains.

== See also ==
- Collaborationism
- Vichy France
- René Bousquet
- Union générale des israélites de France

== Sources ==
- Maurice Rajsfus, La Police de Vichy. Les forces de l’ordre françaises au service de la Gestapo, 1940/44 (Le Cherche Midi éditeur, 1995 - in particular chapter XIV, La Bataille de Marseille, pp. 209–217)
