= The Black Hand (1968 film) =

- Directed by: Max Pécas
- Written by: Jean-Pierre Bastid; Max Pécas
- Produced by: Max Pécas
- Starring: Janine Reynaud; Chantal Nobel; Jean Topart
- Cinematography: Raymond Pierre Lemoigne
- Edited by: Nicole Colombier
- Music by: Derry Hall
- Production companies: Les Films du Griffon; Tigielle 33
- Distributed by: Comptoir Français du Film Production
- Release date: 20 December 1968
- Running time: 86 minutes
- Countries: France; Italy
- Language: French

The Black Hand (French: La main noire, Italian: La mano nera) is a 1968 French-Italian crime thriller film directed by Max Pécas and starring Janine Reynaud, Chantal Nobel and Jean Topart.

== Cast ==
- James Harris as Thomas Varga
- Janine Reynaud as Mafalda
- Anny Nelsen as Albane
- Chantal Nobel as Éléonore
- Jean Topart as Zanror
- Pierre Tissot as Un membre de la Main Noire
- Luigi Cortese as Un homme de main
- Claude Salez as Un membre de la Main Noire
- Michel Charrel as Llasan
- Alfred Baillou as Le nain
- Doris Thomas as Vivian Ray
- Jean Franval as Le garagiste
- Colette Régis as La gouvernante
- Jacques Bernard as Ferenzari
- Rico Lopez as Un homme de main

== Bibliography ==
- Alfred Krawc. International Directory of Cinematographers, Set- and Costume Designers in Film: France (from the beginnings to 1980). Saur, 1983.
