= Thierry Lévy =

French lawyer

- Born: 13 January 1945; Nice, France
- Died: 30 January 2017 (aged 72); Créteil, France
- Education: Lycée Janson-de-Sailly
- Alma mater: Sciences Po, Paris
- Occupations: Lawyer; Defence Attorney; Journalist-Commentator; Campaigner for Criminal Justice Reform; Magazine proprietor
- Parents: Paul Lévy (1876-1960) (father); Rose Salomon Lévy-Nathan (1906-1997) (mother)

Thierry Lévy (French pronunciation: [tjɛʁi levi]; 13 January 1945 – 30 January 2017) was a high-profile French criminal defence lawyer who spent his career in a state of permanent opposition to the French legal establishment. Admitted to the Paris bar in 1969, he went on to appear in a succession of well publicised criminal trials during the ensuing three and a half decades. His father had been a journalist and press proprietor who was not infrequently supportive of nationalist and other right-wing movements. Thierry Lévy's own assessments of the French criminal justice system, which he shared frequently through the print media and, especially during his later years, in television debates, placed him firmly at the liberal-left end of the political spectrum, however. He was a prominent and eloquent backer of the campaign that led to the abolition of the death penalty by Justice Minister Robert Badinter under President Mitterrand in 1981.

== Biography ==
=== Provenance and early years ===
Thierry Lévy was born into a prosperous middle class Jewish family, some five months after the Liberation of Paris. He and his two elder siblings grew up, as one commentator puts it, living in a beautiful house in the [affluent] Bois de Boulogne [quarter of Paris]. Paul Lévy, his father, had been 68 when he was born, and the son, in turn, was just 14 when his father died. Paul Lévy had built his career as a nationalist anti-German and at times polemical journalist during the build up to the First World War, writing for publications such as L'Aurore, Le Journal and L'Intransigeant. He then, in 1918, founded Aux écoutes, a weekly journal which over the next twenty years took a similarly populist line, pursuing a sustained campaign of hostility again Aristide Briand, whom Aux écoutes deplored and despised on account of his "pacifism". Thierry Lévy's mother, born Rose Salomon Nathan (1906-1997), came from eastern France, was a qualified lawyer who later built a career as a respected economist-statistician. Five years before Thierry Lévy's birth France was occupied by German forces. In response to the government antisemitic legislation that followed, Paul Lévy handed over the keys to the office of his political weekly to its former editor-in-chief, Maurice Blanchot, whose journalistic record was similarly nationalistic and anti-German. But Blanchot was not Jewish; and nor was he antisemitic. It was Blanchot who warned his proprietor of the latter's imminent arrest, as a result of which Lévy and his wife escaped to the "forbidden zone" in the south, and successfully hid themselves. Thierry Lévy was accordingly born not in the Paris region but in Nice.

After returning to Paris, Rose Lévy, who was herself a Jewish convert to Catholicism lost little time in arranging for the couple's three children to be received into the Catholic church. The Bishop of Paris performed the baptisms in person. Although admirers thought him a great humanist, there is no reason to think that Thierry Lévy would ever have considered himself a particularly godly man. He was always very conscious of his Jewish provenance however, and in particular sensitive to the ways in which he thought people reacted to him on account of it.

When his father died Thierry Lévy was a pupil at the prestigious Lycée Janson-de-Sailly (secondary school) where he earned his Baccalauréat. Over the next few years he secured his first degree from the Faculty of Law at the Institut d'études politiques de Paris (Sciences Po) in 1967, a University Law qualification (licencié en droit) and a post-graduate degree in Philosophy.

=== Aux écoutes ===
Seven years after his father's death Thierry Lévy took over the reins of Aux écoutes in 1966. The family journal was back in family hands. However, the shrill nationalism that had drawn in readers in the 1930s no longer had so much traction in the 1960s. Aux écoutes had been losing readers for years. Lévy's solution was to transform the publication from its traditional populism into a mouthpiece for ideas coming from intellectual left. However, the market in political opinion magazines was finite, and the readers whom he now hoped to attract already had access to political journals which presumably they mostly knew and trusted. For Aux écoutes, circulation continued to fall away: publication came to an end in 1969. The previous year the owners had been ordered by a Paris court to pay damages of 80,000 francs "plus interest" in respect of a libel claim brought by or on behalf of Jacques Foccart, a government minister. The offending lines in the magazine article had been penned by Lévy himself, and the judgement was given under Article 226 of the French penal code. It was reported that Lévy had been unaware of the existence of Article 226, which was a recent addition to the code. It is not entirely clear from press reports of the case whether the size of the award against the publication was to be seen as a reflection of the court's view of the seriousness of the libel against the government minister, or an expression of displeasure that the article had been seen to "libel", the French justice system by undermining its authority and raising doubts about its independence from the politicians.

=== Defence lawyer ===
==== Claude Buffet ====
His first well-publicised case, following his admission to the bar, came in June 1972 when he found himself appearing with Rémy Crauste to defend Claude Buffet and Roger Bontems who had been charged with murdering a prison guard and a prison nurse after taking them hostage at Clairvaux Prison. Lévy defended Buffet and Crauste defended Bontems. The defence case for Buffet was based, in large part, on the submission that killing the hostages had been the idea of his fellow inmate and co-accused. Buffet himself seems to have been indifferent to his fate, however: both cases were lost. Claude Buffet and Rémy Crauste were executed on the guillotine at La Santé Prison in Paris on 28 November 1972. The two-man prison revolt was presented by Lévy as a predictable human reaction to the conditions under which the accused men had been detained by the French prison system. Continuing media coverage of the verdict and subsequent execution provided a platform that Lévy used to repeat his demands for improvements in French prison conditions.

==== The Halfen brothers and Jean-Louis Bruguière ====
Opposed to the deprivation of liberty, Thierry Lévy on at least one occasion declared himself to be the enemy of all power, all laws and all judges. (Note: "...hostile à tout pouvoir, toute loi, tout juge.") Quite early on, he broke with the justice establishment, refusing to take on any cases in which he might be called upon to demand a prison sentence. He defended the Halfen Brothers, two alleged members of the Action directe (armed terrorist group) after they had been arrested on suspicion of involvement in a serious shooting incident in 1983. He secured an acquittal for Claude Halfen, but Nicolas Halfen was found guilty and sentenced to a ten-year jail term. The case resurfaced in 2009 when Lévy represented Claude Halfen in a defamation action brought against Jean-Louis Bruguière, the investigating magistrate who had earlier been involved in the original case, and the journalist Jean-Marie Pontaut. The case concerned a book of interviews, Ce que je n'ai pas pu dire (loosely, 'Things I could not say [at the time]'), which included the assertion that on 31 May 1983 Claude Halfen had been a member of the Action directe commando team which had killed two policemen and seriously injured a third, as part of what the media were calling by now the "Trudaine Avenue massacre", even though he had not himself fired a shot. This was precisely the charge on which Claude Halfen had been acquitted at his trial on 13 June 1987. The former investigating magistrate Jean-Louis Bruguière was acquitted on the defamation charge by a court of first instance in 2011, but Lévy lodged an appeal on behalf of his client. Later that year the appeal was rejected. Thierry Lévy persisted, however, and according to at least one source the Court of Cassation set aside the acquittal and sent the appeal on the Halfen defamation case for a retrial, to be held before the Court of Appeal at Rennes. The Rennes court again acquitted the defendants. However, in 2015 the Court of Cassation again became involved and set aside the acquittal, citing various statutory violations in the earlier decision.

==== Roger Knobelspiess ====
In 1986 Lévy secured the release of Roger Knobelspiess, already a reformed criminal turned well-known author on account of earlier involvement with the French justice and prisons systems Knobelspiess had received a presidential pardon on account of earlier matters in 1981, and then in 1983 been convicted and imprisoned in connection with an armed robbery which had had always insisted he did not commit. The robbery in question had degenerated into a shoot-out between passengers in a car, and police in pursuit. Knobelspiess, who was driving the car, stated consistently that he never had any homicidal intent, and had been convicted in 1983 purely in account of a long-standing vendetta on the part of certain police officers.

==== Christian Didier ====
Another of Lévy's more widely publicised cases involved Christian Didier, the self-proclaimed killer of René Bousquet. Bousquet was a friend of President Mitterrand: he had served as a senior police official under the Pétain puppet government in the 1940s. Given the agreed facts of his shooting by Didier, a conventional argument for the defence to advance would have involved casting doubt on Didier's mental state. There could be no certainty that Didier would agree to co-operate with such a defence. In the event, however, his own conduct during the trial in 1995 would surely have been enough to persuade the court of, at the very least, his mental instability. Be that as it might, Thierry Lévy and his junior Arnaud Montebourg instead put forward the argument that the killing of René Bousquet by Christian Didier represented a perfectly reasonable response to the failings of the French justice system, given that Bousquet had still been at liberty when he died, despite persisting rumours and allegations of a deeply discreditable wartime record. After the sentence was passed Lévy candidly volunteered that he and Montebourg perhaps had not been the best team to defend their client. Didier was sentenced to ten years of criminal detention.

==== Bernard Lewis ====
Lévy can be said ultimately to have won three of the four cases in which he represented the sometimes combative orientalist historian Bernard Lewis. In respect of the fourth case, which was lost against the Paris-based International League Against Racism and Anti-Semitism (La LICRA), Lewis refused advice that he should appeal the verdict, asserting by way of explanation that he had no confidence in the French justice system.

==== Eva Joly ====
In 2003 he represented Eva Joly, who as an investigating magistrate with a reputation for juridical anti-corruption activism had acquired a certain number of enemies in high places, faced a determined attempt by an alliance of senior lawyers to block the sale and distribution of her book Est-ce dans ce monde-là que nous voulons vivre?(loosely, 'Is this the kind of world we want to live in?'). The very name of the book, in combination with the identity of its author, set off a rattling of skeletons in cupboards, notably among those involved in aspects of the so-called Elf Petroleum scandal and its lengthy investigation. The book was nevertheless published, albeit following a deferral of approximately twelve months.

==== The Clairvaux break-out ====
In another case which hit the headlines in 1999 he appeared - not for the first time - before the Assizes Court at Troyes, on this occasion pleading the case of the so-called Clairvaux escapees. The Advocate General had called for an across the board application of life sentences. Due to security concerns the court was transformed into "a bunker" for the three weeks of the hearing. Following recapture, the men were on trial in connection with their escape from Clairvaux Prison, which they had undertaken in September 1992. The escape had involved the deaths of Marc Dormont, a prison guard, and Rémy Morard, an inmate, both killed in crossfire. The court evidently accepted Lévy's submissions that none of the escapees had killed anyone, either during the escape or while subsequently "on the run". Lévy succeeded in persuading the nine juror-assessors the life sentences would be unprecedented under the circumstances and excessive. The jurors settled for terms of imprisonment for his seven clients of between six and twenty years. It was a victory of sorts, but it triggered a new media outburst in which Thierry Lévy renewed his attack on the justice system.

==== Richard Shirrefs ====
In another defamation matter, Thierry Lévy appeared in 2004 for Eurotunnel Group PDG (Director) Richard Shirrefs. Judgement was obtained against the politician-businessman Nicolas Miguet who was required to pay €10,000 in damages for defamation and insult.

==== Claude Cherki ====
In 2005 he appeared as the lawyer for Claude Cherki, the former head of the Éditions du Seuil publishing business. The case involved a defamation claim against the journalist Jean-Claude Guillebaud. Differences had arisen during acquisition of Seuil by the Martinière Group during 2004: the court was to determine that serious insinuations had been published and Cherki had been forced to resign his directorship. At the conclusion of the trial Cherki, attending the court in person and no longer accompanied by his lawyer, declared his satisfaction that he had regained his honour. Thierry Lévy had won the case for his client, though by some criteria the victory was essentially a moral ones. Damages were set at the "symbolic" quantum of €1. However, Guillebaud was also ordered to pay a fine of €3,000 and to contribute a further €3,000 towards Cherki's legal costs. He was, in addition, ordered to arrange for the publication of the court judgement at his own expense in "Nouvel Observateur" (as "L'Obs" was known before 2014), the news magazine in which the originating libel had appeared in June 2004.

==== Roger Cukierman ====
On 2008 he secured a release from culpability for Roger Cukierman in a tangled "public injury" case brought by Alain Krivine on behalf of the Revolutionary Communist League. The case involved some remarks shared by Cukierman in 2003 at a dinner of the "CRIF", an umbrella body of French Jewish organisations. (Cukierman had served as president of the CRIF between 2001 and 2007.) There were inferences drawn of anti-Zionism aimed at the Revolutionary Communist League. Various prominent members of the Jewish and political communities appeared to testify at the trial, on both sides of the argument.

==== Siné ====
The next year he teamed up with Dominique Tricaud to mount a successful defence of the cartoonist known as Siné in a case launched by "La LICRA". The case involved charges of antisemitism in an article published by Siné in a satirical magazine during the previous summer. (Siné, who relished his reputation as an unapologetic political iconoclast, and "La LICRA" had been at loggerheads for decades.) The LICRA case was rejected by a Lyon court, formally on procedural grounds. A deadline had been missed.

==== Utopia ====
Representing Utopia Cinemas, in 2010 Thierry Lévy secured the rejection of an action launched by the Association culturelle juive des Alpilles. The plaintiffs had identified racism and antisemitism in an edition of the cinema chain's magazine the previous year. Lévy robustly defended the position of the cinema chain and the charge was determined to be "null and inadmissible" by an Avignon court.

=== Beyond the court chamber ===
Between 2000 and 2004, Lévy served as president of the French section of the International Prison Observatory, a non-government organisation promoting the observation of human rights in prisons and campaigning for a reduction in the use of prisons by governments and their agencies, the courts. He campaigned for prison reform till the end of his life.

During the first decade of the twenty-first century Thierry Lévy became a frequent presence in the lengthy television debates between animated intellectuals and showmen that are a feature of French evening television schedules. He could be sharp in his on-screen disagreements with some of the more controversial studio guests including, memorably, Dieudonné M'bala M'bala. A strong believer in free speech, he nevertheless considered that bans on Dieudonné's shows was an error. Other forceful characters with whom Lévy not infrequently clashed in television debates included Jean-Luc Mélenchon, Alain Bauer and Nicolas Sarkozy.

== Publications (selection) ==
In addition to numerous specialist works and articles on legal matters, Thierry Lévy wrote extensively on the art of eloquence and on the professions of legal advocacy. A case in point is the book Convaincre: Dialogue sur l'éloquence (loosely, 'How to convince: a dialogue on eloquence', written jointly with Jean-Denis Bredin. Over the years he also wrote a succession of short snappy essays setting forth his objections to various aspects of the political correctness which, he believed deleterious to modern French society. Some of these are listed below:

- L'Animal judiciaire, Paris, Grasset, 1975
- Le Désir de punir, Fayard, 1979
- Le Crime en toute humanité, Grasset, 1984
- La Société des femmes, Paris, Flammarion, 1987
- Le Droit chemin, Paris, Plon, 1989
- Blessure mortelle (roman), Paris, Flammarion, 1992
- Justice sans Dieu, Odile Jacob, 2000
- Éloge de la barbarie judiciaire, Paris, Odile Jacob, 2004, 187 p. (ISBN 978-2-7381-1554-6)
- L'ouvrage dénonce la « pandémie victimaire » des tribunaux.
- Nos têtes sont plus dures que les murs des prisons, Paris, Grasset, 2006, 83 p. (ISBN 978-2-246-69671-1)
- Lévy oblige, Grasset, 2008
- Rose, Plon, 2015
