= The Great Maguet =

1947 film

- Directed by: Roger Richebé
- Written by: Roger Richebé; Marc-Gilbert Sauvajon
- Based on: La grande Maguet by Catulle Mendès
- Produced by: Roger Richebé
- Starring: Madeleine Robinson; Jean Davy; Colette Régis
- Cinematography: Victor Arménise
- Edited by: Charles Bretoneiche
- Music by: Henri Verdun
- Production company: Films Roger Richebé
- Distributed by: Films Roger Richebé
- Release date: 22 October 1947
- Running time: 90 minutes
- Country: France
- Language: French

The Great Maguet (French: La grande Maguet) is a 1947 French historical drama film directed by Roger Richebé and starring Madeleine Robinson, Jean Davy and Colette Régis. The film's sets were designed by the art director Raymond Gabutti. It was based on the novel of the same title by Catulle Mendès.

== Synopsis ==
Catherine Maguet, an orphan nicknamed "The Great Maguet", is taken in by a kindly chatelaine Suzanne de Norvaisis. Suzanne's husband Edmond falls madly in love with another woman while abroad. In order to marry his new mistress he murders Suzanne with poison and plans his new life. Catherine in loyalty to her former benefactress stabs him dead to avenge the murder.

== Cast ==
- Madeleine Robinson as Catherine Maguet
- Jean Davy as Edmond de Norvaisis
- Michèle Philippe as Suzanne de Norvaisis
- Colette Régis as Béatrice Arnold
- Silvia Monfort as Anaïs Arnold
- Paul Amiot as Le professeur
- Fernand Gilbert as Chambon
- Robert Moor as Le docteur
- Victor Vina as Un paysan
- Marcel Pérès as Un paysan
- Jean-Claude Mathot as Le facteur
- Palmyre Levasseur as La cuisinière
- Jean Relet as Henry
- Béatrice Lulli as Claire

== Bibliography ==
- Goble, Alan. The Complete Index to Literary Sources in Film. Walter de Gruyter, 1999.
- Rège, Philippe. Encyclopedia of French Film Directors, Volume 1. Scarecrow Press, 2009.
