= Pierre Hatet =

French actor (1930–2019)

- Born: Pierre Marius Alfred Hatet; 20 April 1930; Auffay, Seine-Maritime, France
- Died: 24 May 2019 (aged 89); Paris, France
- Occupation: Actor

Pierre Hatet (20 April 1930 – 24 May 2019) was a French actor. In more than 60 years of career, he appeared in several theatre plays, television series and films.

Very active as well in the dubbing field, he was the regular French voice of Christopher Lloyd, including the role of Emmett "Doc" Brown in the Back to the Future trilogy, as well as the Joker in the majority of his appearances in Batman between 1992 and 2015. He also dubbed the character Brain in the animated series Pinky and the Brain, colonel Shikishima in Akira and Nakamura in Ghost in the Shell.

== Life and career ==
Pierre Hatet was born in Auffay in the department of Seine-Maritime (formerly Seine-Inférieure). Interested by theatre, he frequented the classes of the Centre of Dramatic Art located rue Blanche in Paris (in the same promotion as Jean-Paul Roussillon, Annie Girardot and Jacques Ruisseau), before entering the Conservatoire national supérieur d'art dramatique, period during which he was the partner of Annie Girardot. Jean Vilar remarks him and introduces him into the field of classical theatre, where he performs dramatic plays for radio and television before starting dubbing. His friend Jacques Ruisseau, who was the assistant of the artistic director Serge Luguen, encourages him to entrust Pierre Hatet the title role of the series Mannix. He will then voice Gomez in the French version of the animated series The Mysterious Cities of Gold.

But his most well-known role remains without any doubt the French voice of Doc in the Back to the Future trilogy (1985–1990), in which the replica "Nom de Zeus" (French for "Great Scott") has durably marked the spirits. He also became the French voice of the Joker in Batman: The Animated Series (1992–1995), and of many other cartoon characters including the Brain in Pinky and the Brain from The Animaniacs.

In 2002, he participated at an evening at the Grand Rex in Paris, to promote the release on DVD of the Back to the Future trilogy, in which he performed an improvisation. He was also the French voice of the Joker in the video games Batman: Arkham Asylum and Batman: Arkham City.

In 2012, he performed the voice-over in the documentary La Revanche des Geeks, in tribute of his dubbings that have become mythical in the geek culture. The documentary was broadcast on Arte on 28 Avril 2012.

He dubbed once again the Joker in the French version of the video game Batman Arkham Knight (2015) and one last time in the trailer of Batman: Arkham VR that will only be released in English and subtitled.
