= Jean Baylet =

French politician

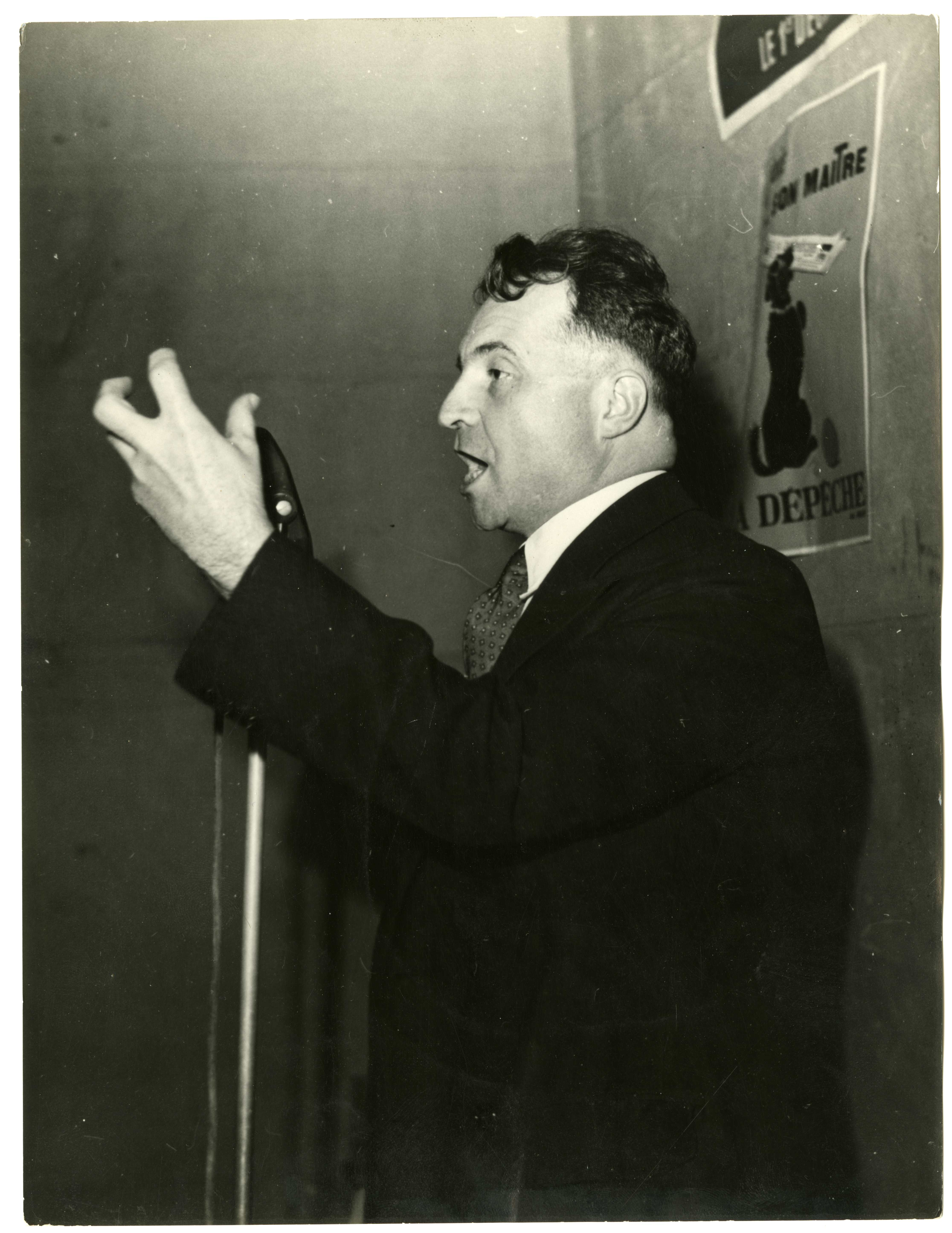

Member of the National Assembly for Tarn-et-Garonne
- In office 1945–1958

Personal details
- Born: 6 April 1904; Valence-d'Agen, France
- Died: 29 May 1959 (aged 55); Montgaillard-Lauragais, France
- Political party: Radical Party
- Spouse: Évelyne Isaac
- Children: Jean-Michel Baylet

Jean Baylet (6 April 1904 – 29 May 1959) was a French politician. He represented the Radical Party in the Constituent Assembly elected in 1945, in the Constituent Assembly elected in 1946 and in the National Assembly from 1946 to 1958.
