= Carl Oberg =

SS and Police leader in occupied France

Carl Albrecht Oberg
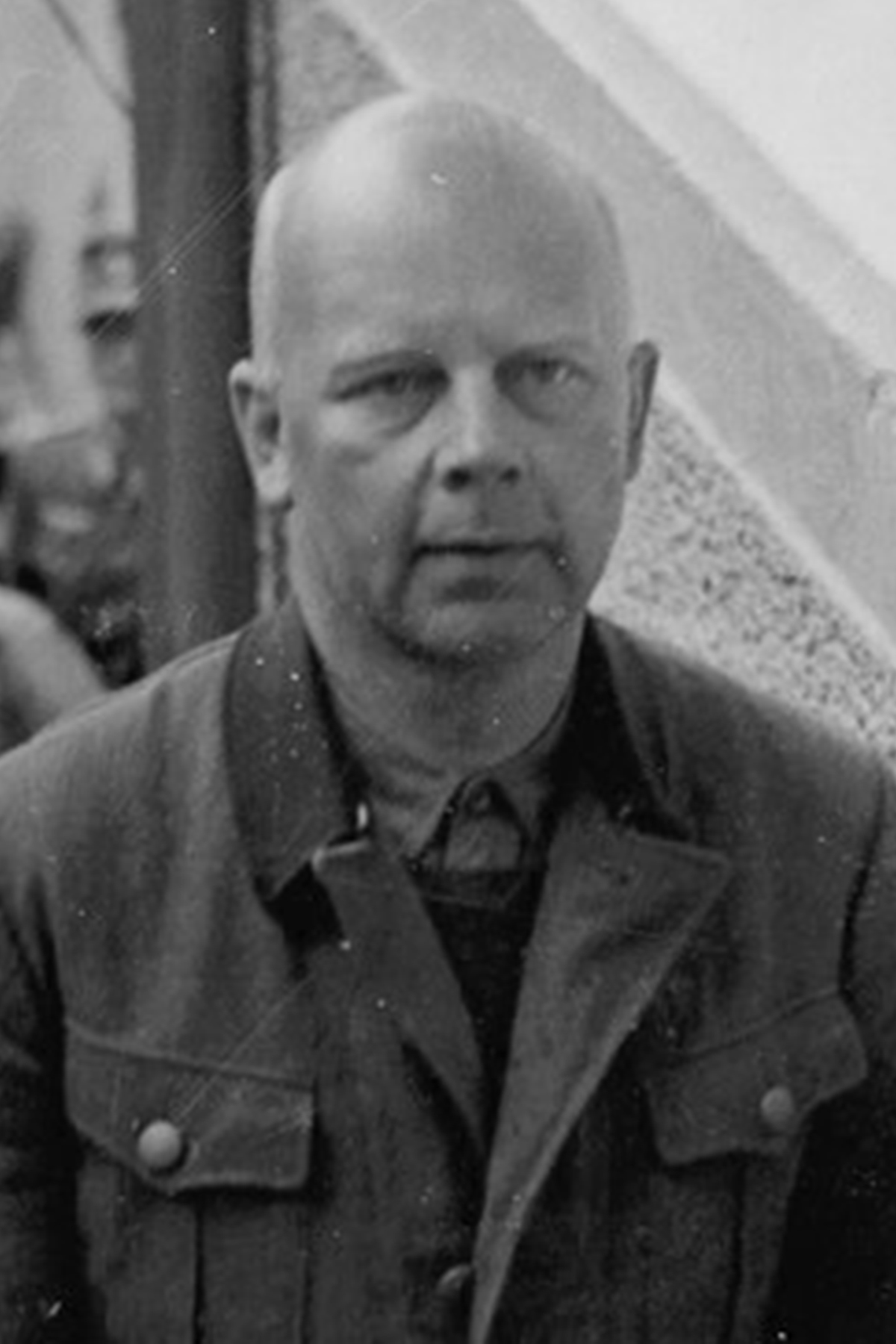
- Oberg in 1945
- Born: 27 January 1897; Hamburg, German Empire
- Died: 3 June 1965 (aged 68); Flensburg, Schleswig-Holstein, West Germany
- Status: Deceased
- Convictions: British Military; War crimes French Military; Crimes against humanity
- Penalty: British Military; Death; commuted to life imprisonment French Military; Death; commuted to life imprisonment; further commuted to 20 years imprisonment with hard labour
- SS service
- Allegiance: Nazi Germany
- Branch: Schutzstaffel
- Service years: 1933–1945
- Rank: SS-Obergruppenführer
- Nickname: The Butcher of Paris
- Commands: SS and Police Leader Radom, General Government, German-occupied Poland (August 1941 – May 1942); Higher SS and Police Leader French State (May 1942 — November 1944)

Carl Albrecht Oberg (27 January 1897 – 3 June 1965) was a German SS functionary during the Nazi era. He served as Senior SS and Police Leader (HSSPF) in occupied France, from May 1942 to November 1944, during the Second World War, Oberg came to be known as the Butcher of Paris. From May 1942, under orders from Reinhard Heydrich, Oberg ordered the execution of hundreds of hostages and the roundup and deportation of over 40,000 Jews from France to extermination camps.

Arrested by American military police in Tyrol in July 1945, Oberg was sentenced to death by both British and French courts, before being handed over to the French. In 1958 his death sentence was commuted to life imprisonment and later reduced to 20 years at hard labour. Oberg was eventually released on 28 November 1962 and pardoned by President Charles de Gaulle. He died in West Germany on 3 June 1965.

== Early life ==
Carl Albrecht Oberg was born in Hamburg on 27 January 1897, the son of a physician and professor of medicine Prof. Dr. Carl Joseph Gustav Alexander Oberg. In August 1914, he volunteered for the army with the Holsteinisches Feld-Artillerie-Regiment Nr. 24. His enlistment was postponed, he then achieved his war Abitur in August 1915 and was subsequently assigned to the artillery, serving as battery officer with Lauenburgisches Feld-Artillerie-Regiment Nr. 45. On 21 September 1916, he was commissioned as a Leutnant fighting on the Western Front and was awarded the Iron Cross in both classes. He worked in manufacturing as a branch manager after the war until he was laid off in 1930.

== Nazi career ==
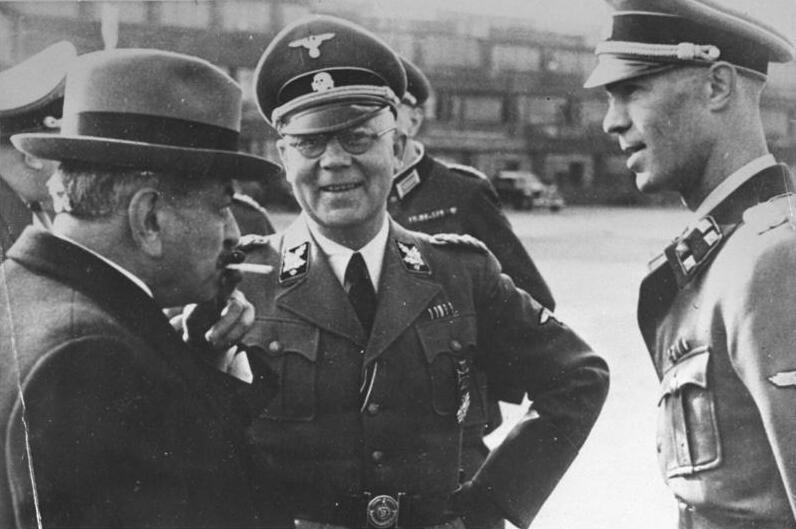
Oberg (centre) with French Prime Minister Pierre Laval and SS-Sturmbannführer Herbert Hagen, German Police Headquarters in Paris, 1 May 1943

Oberg joined the Nazi Party on 1 April 1931 and the Schutzstaffel (SS) on 7 April 1932. After meeting Reinhard Heydrich in May 1933, he asked Heydrich for a job and joined the Sicherheitsdienst (SD). Oberg was later promoted to an SS-Oberführer and made the police administrator for Hanover. He served in that capacity from September 1938 until January 1939, then serving as police president of Zwickau until late 1941. He was SS-und Polizeiführer (SS and Police Leader – SSPF), "Radom" from August 1941 to May 1942. Oberg received a promotion to SS-Brigadeführer on 20 April 1942.

From 5 May 1942 to 28 November 1944, Oberg served as Higher SS and Police Leader (Höherer SS-und Polizeiführer, HSSPF) "Frankreich" (France) over all German police forces in France, including the SD and the Gestapo. He was the supreme authority in France for managing anti-Jewish policy and the battle against the French Resistance. In 1942, shortly after his arrival, he issued the Jewish badge decree for identification, supported the roundup of 13,152 Jews in the Paris Vélodrome d'Hiver (Vel' d'Hiv Roundup), and ordered mass execution of hostages in retribution for acts of the French resistance. He earned condemnation as the "Butcher of Paris". On Heydrich's orders, Oberg deported over 40,000 Jews from the country with the assistance of the Vichy France police force headed by René Bousquet.

On 18 January 1943, Himmler demanded a "cleansing" of Marseille with 100,000 arrests and explosive demolition of the city's crime district. Working with the French police, Oberg supervised a lesser response of 6,000 arrests, 20,000 people displaced, and partial destruction of the harbour area. In 1944, Oberg blocked an attempt to establish an Einsatzkommando of the Waffen-SS in France. On 10 March 1945, he became a General der Waffen-SS.

== Post-war trial, sentence, and reprieve ==
Oberg was captured in June 1945 in the mountains near Kitzbuhel by the U.S. military. He had been disguised as a private in the Austrian Army. He was sentenced to death by a British court before receiving another death sentence from the French in October 1954. On 10 April 1958, the sentence was commuted to life by French President Vincent Auriol, whose successor René Coty then reduced it further to 20 years hard labor in 1959. On 20 November 1962, Oberg was pardoned by President Charles de Gaulle and set free on 28 November 1962. (Note: According to former French Premier Pierre Mendes France the pardon of Oberg (and Helmut Knochen) was a demand of German Chancellor Konrad Adenauer.) Oberg then was repatriated to Flensburg, in the north of the German state of Schleswig-Holstein, at the time, according to Die Zeit, a stronghold of former Nazis and SS cadres.
