= Jean-Michel Baylet =

French politician

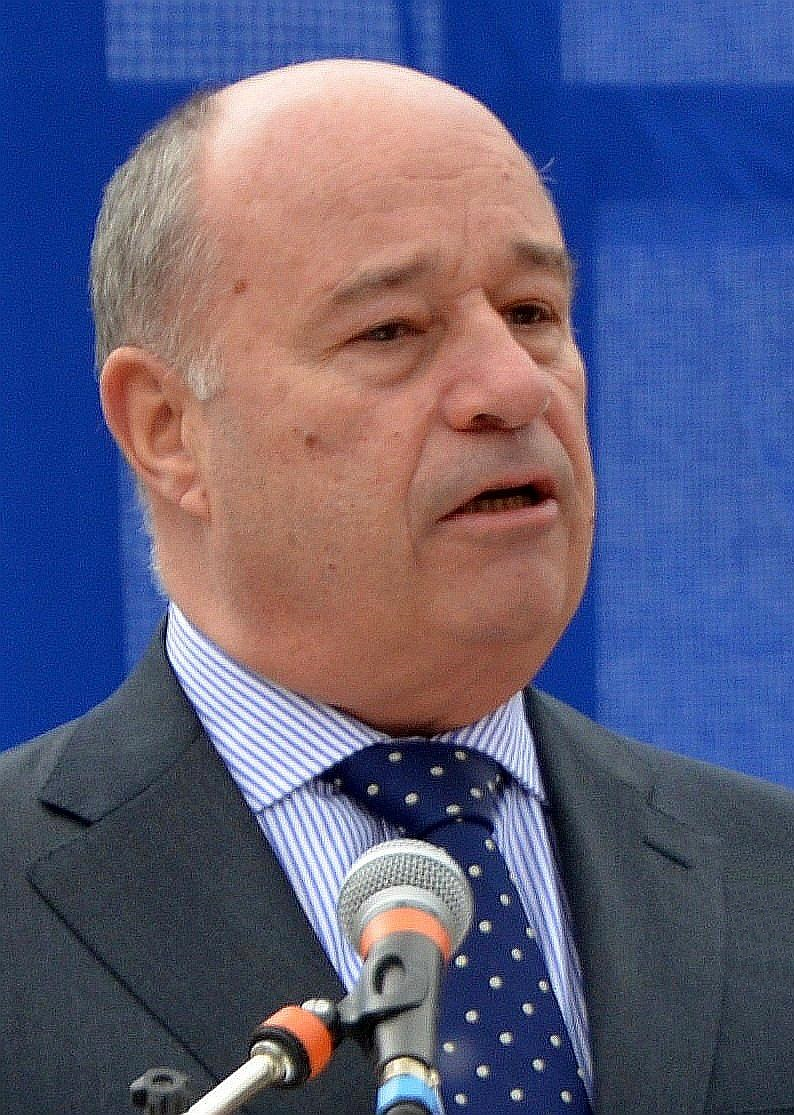

Member of the French Senate for Tarn-et-Garonne
- In office 1995–2014
- Succeeded by: François Bonhomme

Personal details
- Born: 17 November 1946 (age 79) Toulouse, France
- Party: Radical Party of the Left

Jean-Michel Baylet (born 17 November 1946 in Toulouse, Haute-Garonne) is a French politician, Senator, and former leader of the moderate center-left Radical Party of the Left.

He is a RDSE Senator from the Tarn-et-Garonne department. He is also President of the General Council of the Tarn-et-Garonne. He also served as mayor Valence-d'Agen until 2001 and had various roles in the governments of Laurent Fabius, Michel Rocard, Édith Cresson, and Pierre Beregovoy.

In addition to his political career, he was a journalist for the La Dépêche du Midi newspaper, before inheriting that newspaper and other print media from his mother.

Baylet was candidate to the citizens presidential primary of 2011; he lost against Martine Aubry, François Hollande, Ségolène Royal, Arnaud Montebourg and Manuel Valls (all socialists).
