= La Dépêche du Midi =

French regional daily newspaper

- Headquarters: Toulouse
- Country: France
- ISSN: 0181-7981 (print); 2426-6388 (web)
- Website: www.ladepeche.fr

La Dépêche du Midi editing room (top) and printing room (bottom) in Toulouse (1905)
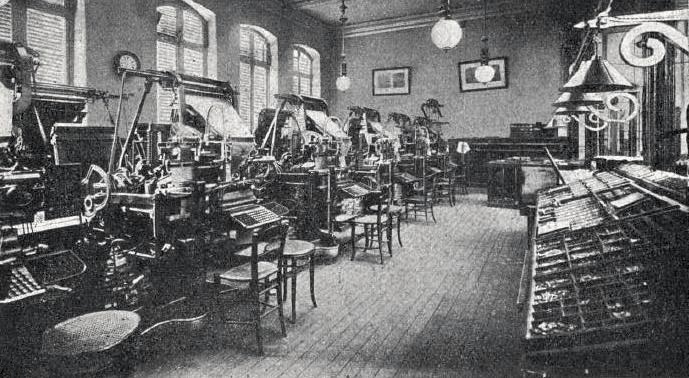
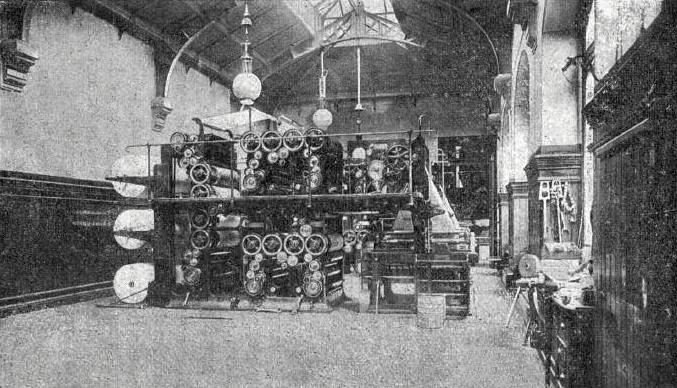

La Dépêche, formally La Dépêche du Midi (French pronunciation: [la depɛʃ dy midi]), is a regional daily newspaper published in Toulouse in Southwestern France, with seventeen editions for different areas of the Midi-Pyrénées region. The main local editions are for Toulouse, Ariège, Aude, Aveyron, Haute-Garonne, Gers, Lot, Lot-et-Garonne, Hautes-Pyrénées, Tarn, and Tarn-et-Garonne.

== History and profile ==
The newspaper first appeared on 2 October 1870 when it was called La Dépêche de Toulouse. Publication was prompted by workers at the Sirven print works in Toulouse, which established the paper's left-leaning political stance. It was at La Dépêche that the Socialist politician Jean Jaurès wrote his first articles. The paper also published the articles by Georges Clemenceau. In the big issue of the day, the Dreyfus affair, the paper first insisted Alfred Dreyfus had given army secrets to the German Empire but then came out in his support.

The paper fell under German control after the Nazi occupation of 1940. Like other newspapers that had collaborated during the war, La Dépêche de Toulouse was closed by the postwar government in 1944. It reappeared under its current name in 1947. Like its predecessor La Dépêche du Midi has a leftist stance.

The newspaper is part of Groupe La Dépêche du Midi. The combined circulation for the 17 regional dailies under La Dépêche du Midi was 200,000 copies in 2006.

Weekly circulation of the newspaper
Year	Weekly circulation
2003	200,000
2004	–
2005	200,090
2006	196,641
2007	197,751
2008	196,749
2009	190,875
2010	186,213
2011	180,969
2012	174,511
2013	166,137
2014	157,215
2015	149,998
2016	144,419
2017	140,097
2018	133,074
2019	127,466
