= Convoy 77 of July 31, 1944 =

Large convoy of Jews deported in 1944

Convoy 77 of July 31, 1944 was the last large convoy of Jews held at the Drancy internment camp, who were transported from Bobigny station to the Auschwitz-Birkenau extermination camp.

This convoy, besides the large number of deportees including very young children, is stamped with the features of the emergency organization triggered by the imminent debacle of the German army: the geographical origins of the deportees were quite diverse (even though over half were born in France), and certain individuals (soldiers’ wives, those married to Aryans, etc.), who had sometimes been interned in Drancy's satellite camps known as "Parisian camps", enjoyed a status that had protected them up to then from being "transported". What characterizes convoy 77, however, is SS officer Alois Brunner's special focus on the deportation of children.

== History ==
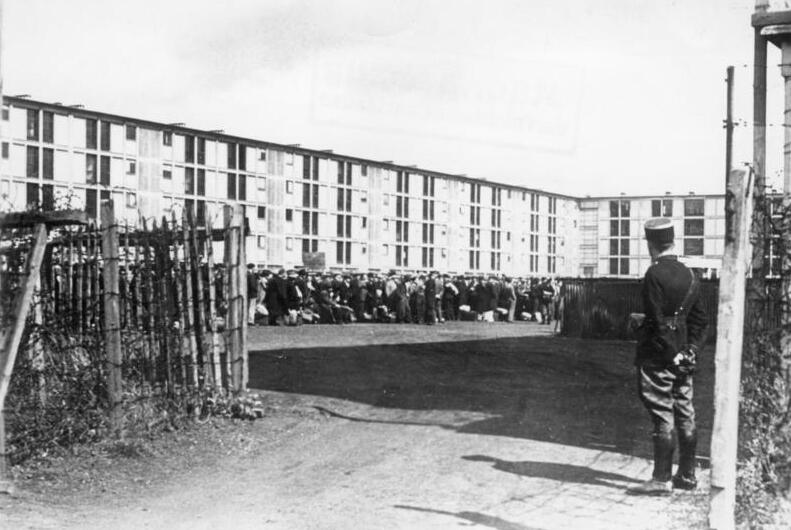
Drancy camp, August 1941

Convoy 77 left from the Drancy camp on July 31, 1944, seventeen days before the liberation of the camp. It contained 1,309 people, 324 of whom were young children and infants, piled into cattle cars.

It arrived during the night of August 3rd, and the "sélection" was immediately carried out. The official date assigned to the death of those deportees who did not actually enter the camp is August 5, 1944.

When the Auschwitz camp was liberated by the Red Army on January 7, 1945, only 250 deportees from this convoy had survived; 847 had been exterminated in the gas chambers upon arrival

=== List of people deported ===
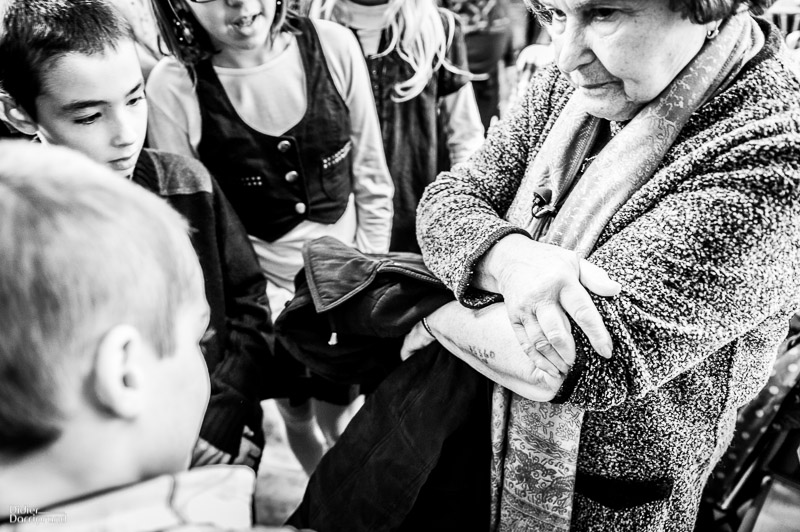
Ida Fensterszab-Grinspan, French woman deported at 14 to Auschwitz in convoy 77 and survived, during a meeting with the pupils of the school which bears her name in Sompt (Deux-Sèvres).

This convoy included Edma, the mother of Éliane Amado Levy-Valensi, the resistance agent; Yvette Lévy, a survivor of the Shoah; Régine Skorka-Jacubert; Jankiel Fensterszab, the father of the resistance fighter, Ida Grinspan, M.O.I.; Golda Klejman, the young resistance fighter; Jean-Guy Bernard (Combat), who was the husband of another member of the Resistance, Yvette Farnoux, deported in convoy 72 (and sole survivor); Gérard Klebinder, the husband of Edith Klebinder, herself deported in convoy 71 and a witness testifying at Klaus Barbie's trial; and 15-year-old Claude Bloch, a witness to the Shoah.

=== Children ===
Alois Brunner, the commandant of the Drancy camp, pressed by the advance of the allied troops after the Normandy landing on June 6, 1944 and helped by the confusion set off by the failed assassination attempt against Hitler on July 20, seized the opportunity to pursue his murderous folly. He was determined to leave no Jewish child alive before he was through, and he ordered roundups where he was certain to find children: the children's centers and orphanages of the Union générale des israélites de France (Union générale des israélites de France) (UGIF) in the Paris area and homes where this organization had placed the isolated children and orphans in its official care instead of dispersing them.

More than 300 children (including 18 infants and 217 children between the age of 1 to 14) were arrested, taken off to Drancy, and deported in convoy 77.

=== Makeup of the convoy ===
Most of the deportees were born in France (55%). Thirty-five nationalities were represented, among whom – other than French (including Algerians) – were Poles, Turks, Soviets (especially Ukrainians) and Germans, to mention the most numerous.

The number of children deported was high (324). 125 were under ten years old.

Most of them were born in France and came from the UGIF centers, sometimes after transiting in provincial camps. (Angoulême, Lyon, Pithiviers or Beaune-la-Rolande), and their parents had already been deported.

=== The UGIF ===
Location of UGIF offices in 1942

The law of November 29, 1941, created the Union générale des israélites de France (UGIF), under the guidance of the Commissariat général aux questions juives (directed by Xavier Vallat) and on the instigation of the Gestapo. It functioned in both the Occupied Zone and in the Free Zone. Its role was to "represent the Jews before the public authorities, notably for issues of insurance and social status". All the Jews of France, whether French or foreign, were compelled to adhere. To cover its operating expenses and pay the billion-franc fine demanded by the Germans, it was given the task of collecting an annual tax on all Jews over 18 years old. Meanwhile, the possessions and businesses of the Jews were seized, and Jews were excluded from many professions (civil service, the press, teaching, etc., by the promulgation of Marshal Pétain's decree of October 3, 1940.

As its official mission was assistance, the Jewish children whose parents had been arrested were entrusted to it. To that end the UGIF opened "children's centers", orphanages and vocational schools, where adolescents were also lodged. Some of these children had been placed there by their families, but most of the boarders in the centers administered by the UGIF were registered with the German authorities at Drancy. They were designated as "blocked children".

=== Responsibility of the UGIF ===
Assigned by the Germans with the responsibility for supplying the camp at Drancy and its satellite camps, the Picpus hospice, etc. with provisions, gear necessary for the journey east, and medical equipment, the UGIF assisted the destitute prisoners and provided blankets for the deportees.

Several survivors, as well as researchers and historians, have wondered about the implication of the UGIF in the deportation of the children, not only in convoy 77, but in others, as well.

Voices were raised at the Liberation to look into the accountability of the surviving members of the UGIF. A panel of citizens was named, which ruled that the organization was not at fault. Certain testimony brought out that the UGIF covered "a vast illegal Resistance network".

=== The fate of the deportees of convoy 77 ===
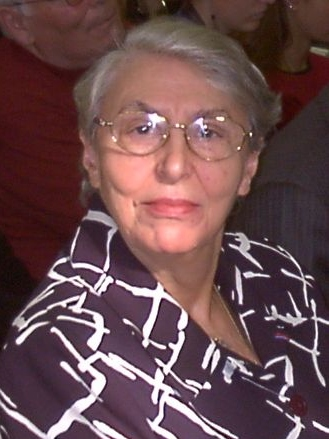
Yvette Lévy, deported at 18 and survivor of convoy 77.

Of the 1,310 deportees who arrived at Auschwitz, over half, including the children, were sent directly to the gas chambers. 291 men and 183 women were selected for work duty.

Among the men selected at least 75 were sent on October 26, 1944, to the Stutthof concentration camp near Gdansk in Poland, and then transferred in November 1944 to the secondary camps of Hailfingen/Tailfingen, Echterdingen, Dautmergen (Schömberg), and Ohrduf in Germany, even to Natzweiler-Struthof in Alsace. From there prisoners were transferred to the camp at Vaihingen sur l'Enz for the sick and dying at. A few were deported to Bergen-Belsen.

When the Auschwitz camp was liberated by the Red Army, on January 27, 1945, only 250 deportees had survived the forced labor, abuse, pseudo-medical experiments, and deprivations: 93 men and 157 women. Recent work by Alexandre Doulut and Sandrine Labeau has yielded these figures. The list of this convoy's deportees is available on the site of the Convoi 77 Association, along with more than two hundred fifty of their biographies (as of February 2022).

==== Chronology of convoy 77 ====
According to the work of the German historian, Volker Mall, the chronology is as follows

- July 31, 1944: departure from Drancy of 1,310 women men and children.
- August 3, 1944:
  - arrival at Auschwitz-Birkenau (Poland).
  - 847 deportees sent to the gas chambers.
  - selection for slave labor: 291 men (I.D. numbers B-3673 to B-3963); 183 women (I.D. numbers A-16652 to A-16834)
- October 26, 1944: at least 75 men sent to the Stutthof concentration camp (I.D. numbers B-3675 to B-3955).
- October 28, 1944: arrival at Stutthof, Poland.
- November 1944:
  - 25 prisoners sent to the secondary camp at Hailfingen/Tailfingen in Germany.
  - 20 prisoners sent to the secondary camp of Echterdingen in Germany.
  - two prisoners probably sent to the Dautmergen camp in Germany.
  - one prisoner sent to the Natzweiler-Struthof concentration camp in Alsace, perhaps to the Offenburg Kommando.
- January 9, 1945, and following: prisoners who were ill at the Echterdingen camp were transferred to the death camp at Vaihingen/Enz-Dachau.
- January 20, 1945: prisoners at Echterdingen were sent to the Ohrdruf camp, and on to Bergen-Belsen in Germany.
- January 27, 1945: liberation of Auschwitz by the Red Army.
- February 13, 1945: several of the convoy's prisoners sent to Vaihingen/Enz.
- February 26 – March 20: prisoners sent to the Ohrdruf camp, then on to Bergen-Belsen.
- April 1, 1945: evacuation of the camp at Vaihingen/Enz to Dachau.
- April 7, 1945: liberation of Vaihingen/Enz by the French Army: two ill prisoners.
- April 29, 1945: liberation of Dachau by the American Army: four prisoners.

== The Convoi 77 Association: for the memory and the history of convoy 77 ==
To perpetuate the memory by digging out and publishing the stories of the children, women, and men who were deported in convoy 77 an association was set up on October 25, 2014 under the impulsion of Georges Mayer, the son of Alex Mayer, one of the survivors of convoy 77.

Secular and non-political, the Association is made up of friends and families of the deportees, and a few of the survivors. Convoi 77 is open to anyone wishing to participate or support its project to recover the history and transmit the memory of the Shoah, in the same vein as the tremendous work done by Serge and Beate Klarsfeld, who are the references in this area.

Convoi 77's project is in keeping with the undertaking to keep alive the memory of the Jewish victims of the Shoah and to restore their status as individual human beings among the multitude. Moreover, the Convoi 77 Association, cognizant of the historical work already accomplished, is also aware of the specific current state of affairs, with the passing of the last eyewitnesses and the reappearance of hate speech spread by new communication networks. It has therefore opted to link the task of gathering the material on the deportees in the archives with an effort to make young Europeans aware of the political and ideological processes that led to the Shoah.

Convoi 77 thus functions on two levels:

- collecting the archives and testimony: This is a truly large-scale project insofar as for more than 900 of the deportees in this convoy there is no direct way to retrieve personal and family documents. Biographies are written and published on the Association's website, illustrated whenever possible with photos and/or documents. Flexibility of tone is encouraged, leaving the writer of each article free to choose the form and style they feel best suited to bring those who vanished back to life. As for any historical work, the information evolves with the availability of the sources and the research accomplished. The biographies therefore reflect what is known at a given moment and are consequently subject to revision in content and sources cited.
- contributing to the research and furthering the teaching of the Shoah to young Europeans: in its ongoing research into the archives and private testimony the "Convoy 77 European Project" associates adolescent students and their teachers in the 35 countries from which the deportees of convoy 77 originated. They are asked to search for the traces of the deceased victims who were born or lived however briefly where these young people are living today. People their grandparents may have lived among or even known personally. Often students in different countries may work on the biography of a given person; in this way, to piece together the life of someone born in Poland and arrested in France, Polish and French students will, as far as possible, pool their research.

This task of seeking and comparing archives is intended to help young people understand the reality of the concentration camps while initiating them at the same time in the complexities and difficulties that historians must confront. It is a way to arouse their critical faculties so as to deal with all kinds of oversimplifications and distortions.

The "Convoy 77 European Project" was officially launched in April 2015 at the Maison de France in Israel, with nineteen ambassadors and representatives of foreign embassies present, and in France on January 27, 2017, by the Minister of Education, Najat Vallaud-Belkacem, who presented it as one of the projects to extend the teaching of the Shoah. The Convoy 77 Project is supported by the European Union, the Fondation pour la mémoire de la Shoah, the Mémorial de la Shoah, the Paris Municipality, the OSE, the Fils et filles de déportés juifs de France [Sons and Daughters of the Jewish deportees of France], and several French ministries and associations.

The teachers and students who are taking part in the project have a dedicated website for communication with the Association and with one another. Classes in France have begun work. In 2017 a 9th-grade class of the Charles Péguy Junior High School in Palaiseau, led by their teacher, Claire Podetti, chose the theater to bring the deportee Jankiel Fensterszab, Ida Grinspan's father, to life. A 10th-grade class of the Simone Dounon High School in Cosne-sur-Loire and their teacher inquired into the deportation of a mother and daughter who lived in Bourges, while students at the La Prat's High School in Cluny, in the framework of the "Matricule" project undertaken by their establishment, are researching the Saône-et-Loire departmental archives on the Handzel family from Luxemburg, who were refugees at Sancé deported in the convoy. The work done by students of the Gustave-Eiffel High School at Rueil-Malmaison under the supervision of their teacher was broadcast on Radio France Culture in June 2017 The Association does systematic documentary research in the French and international archives likely to contain documents (often unknown or unexploited) concerning the deportees of the convoy, with partners such as the Mémorial de la Shoah, the Archives nationales, the ministère des Armées DAVCC (Division of the Archives of Victims of Contemporary Conflicts, Caen and Vincennes) or the archives de la préfecture de police de Paris. Any information on people deported in convoy 77 and any document pertaining to them or their families which happen to have been preserved in family archives are also of interest to the Association, which can be contacted on its website or through its Facebook page.

Finally, Convoy 77 encourages institutions of higher learning to join in the project. In France the Institut d'études politiques de Paris (Sciences Po) and the université de Paris VIII Saint-Denis are partners in the program. A dozen students for a Master of Archival Science degree, under the direction of Professor Marie-Anne Matard Bonucci, carried out research in 2017–2018 on twelve deportees and wrote up their biographies for the site. Another group in 2018–2019 is taking up their work. Two working groups at Sciences Po interface with other educational institutions, one group with French schools, the other with schools in the implicated foreign countries.

Productive exchanges are ongoing with associations whose goals and research interconnect with those of Convoi 77. For example, the Association pour la mémoire des enfants juifs déportés (AMEJD), which repertories the deported children with a view to putting a commemorative plaque on the walls of the schools they attended. Similarly, there is a dynamic relationship with the Mémorial des Judéo-Espagnols déportés de France / Muestros Dezaparesidos, as there were many Spanish Jews in the convoy.

Work in connection with the project has taken off in Algeria, Germany, Belgium, Denmark, Italy and Poland. Both nationally and internationally Convoi 77 organizes and takes part in exhibitions, debates and conferences. The Association contributes to focus groups on the Shoah and fosters the reconstitution of its history and the effort to keep its memory alive.

== Bibliography ==
- Céline Marrot-Fellag Ariouet, "Les enfants cachés pendant la seconde guerre mondiale aux sources d'une histoire clandestine. Part II – Juifs et chrétiens au secours des enfants. 1) Les organisations juives", 2005, site of La Maison de Sèvres
- Alex Mayer, Auschwitz, le 16 mars 1945, Paris, Le Manuscrit, coll. «Témoignages de la Shoah», 2004, 128 p. (ISBN 978-2-7481-3948-8, OCLC 238208148).
- Camille Menager, Le Sauvetage des Juifs à Paris. 1940 -1944, Mairie de Paris, s. d. 2007 (?)
- Maurice Rajsfus, Des Juifs dans la collaboration. L’UGIF 1971-1944, Preface by Pierre Vidal-Naquet, éd. Études et Documentation Internationales, Paris, 1980. ISBN 978-2-85139-057-8
- Vivette Samuel, Sauver les enfants, Éditions Liana Levi, 1995.
- Régine Skorka-Jacubert, Fringale de vie contre usine à mort, Le Manuscrit, 2009, 251 p. ISBN 978-2-304-02558-3.
- Annette Wieviorka et Michel Laffitte, À l'intérieur du camp de Drancy, Paris, Perrin, 2012, 382 p. (ISBN 978-2-262-03423-8, OCLC 955314777)
- Sabine Zeitoun, L’Œuvre de secours aux enfants (O.S.E.) sous l’Occupation en France: du légalisme à la résistance (1940–1944), preface by Serge Klarsfeld, L’Harmattan, 1990. Second edition revised and edited, 2012. It is based on her doctoral dissertation in history under the direction of Rita Thalmann and Michelle Perrot (1986, Université de Paris VII-Jussieu).
- Sabine Zeitoun, Ces enfants qu'il fallait sauver, Paris, Albin Michel, 1989, 287 p. (ISBN 978-2-226-03680-3, OCLC 231137064).

== Filmography ==
- Auschwitz Lutetia, documentary film, Pascal Magontier, 58 min, 2000.

== See also ==
- Drancy Internment Camp
