= Hôtel de Ville, Bobigny =

Town hall in Bobigny, France

Hôtel de Ville
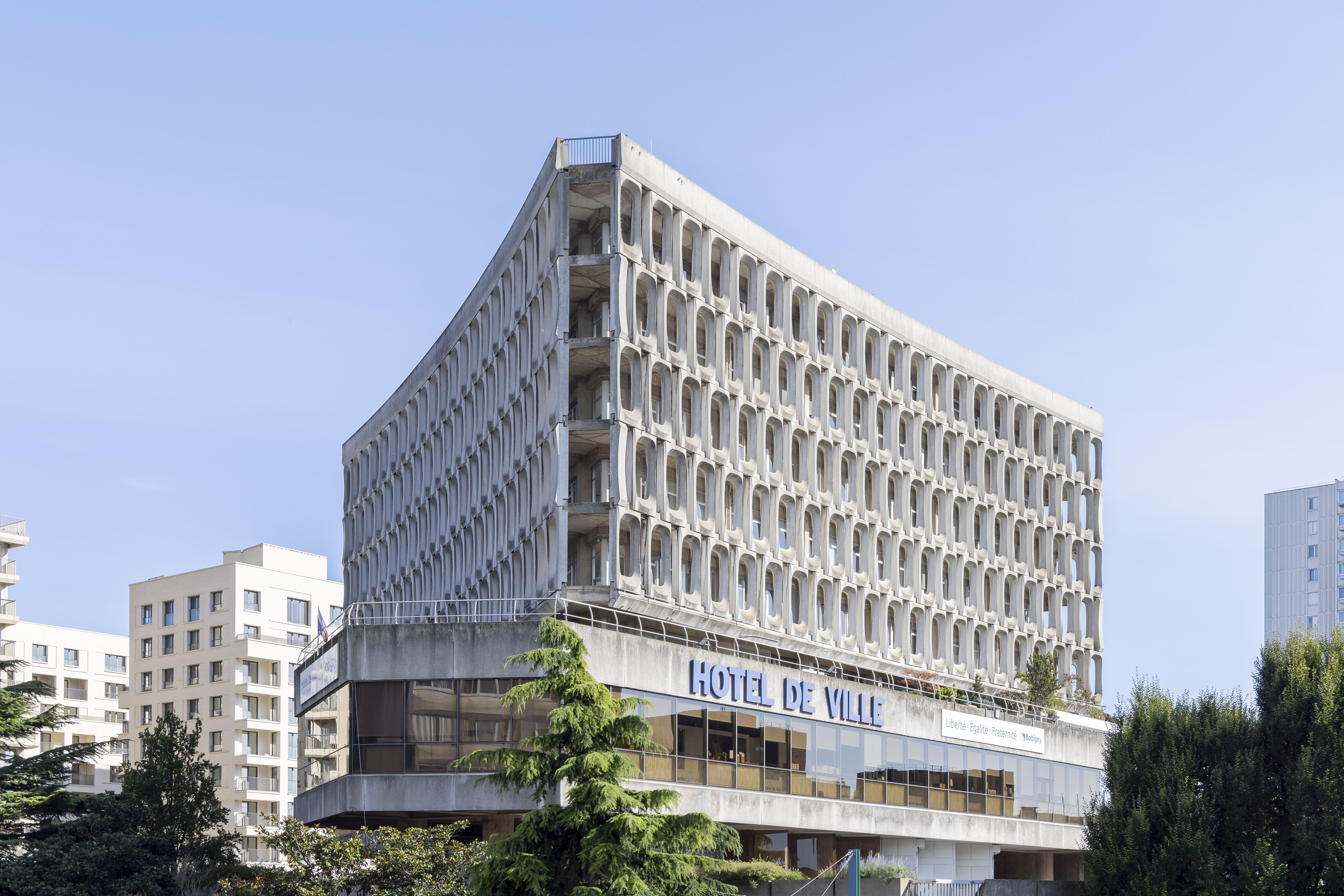
- The main frontage of the Hôtel de Ville in September 2024
- Interactive map of the Hôtel de Ville area

General information
- Type: City hall
- Architectural style: Modern style
- Location: Bobigny, France
- Coordinates: 48.9061°N 2.4451°E
- Completed: 1974

Design and construction
- Architect: Marius Depont

The Hôtel de Ville (French pronunciation: [otɛl də vil], City Hall) is a municipal building in Bobigny, Seine-Saint-Denis in the northeastern suburbs of Paris, standing on Avenue du Président Salvador Allende.

== History ==
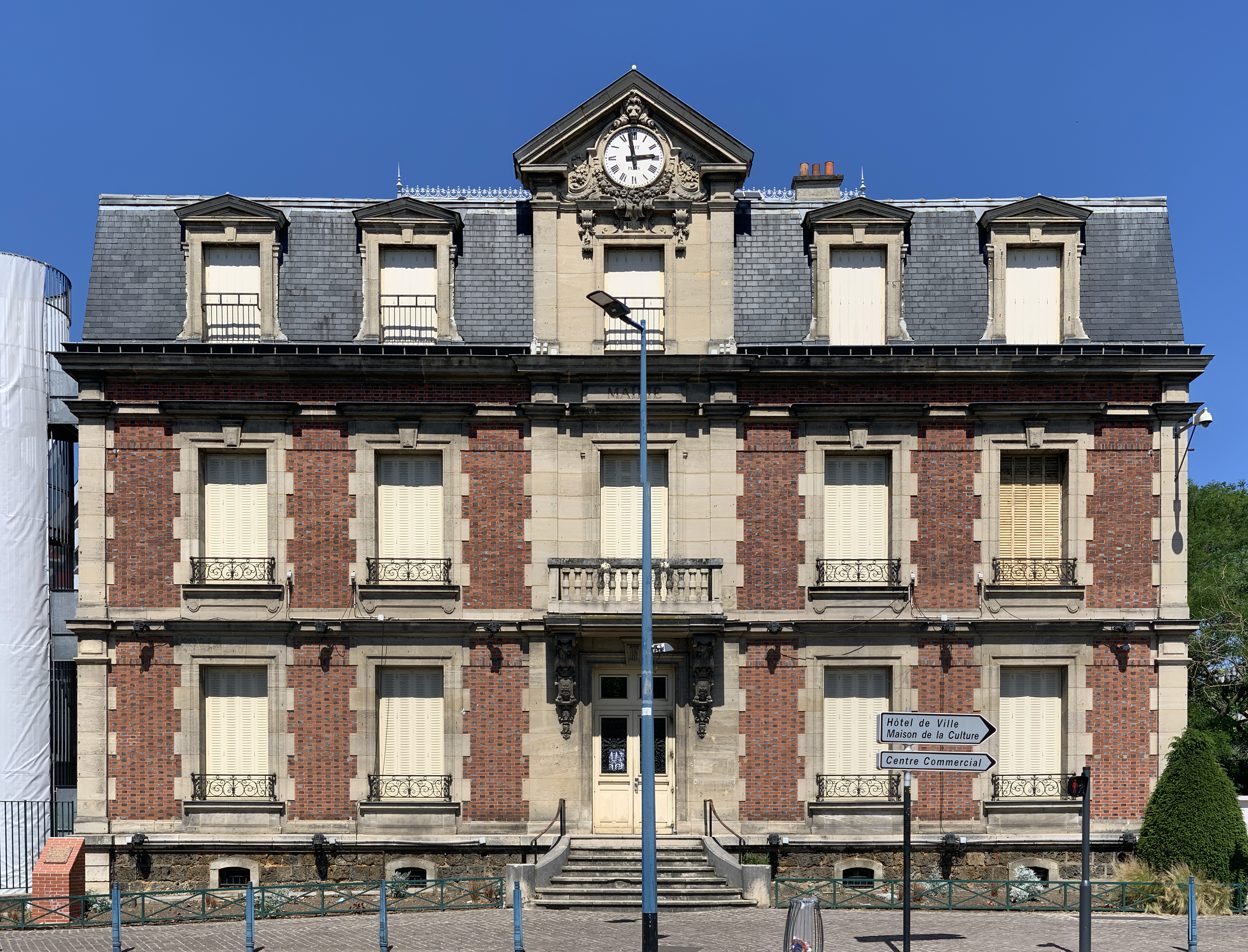
The first town hall

Following the French Revolution, the town council initially met in the Church of Saint Andrew. Later an office was established in a dilapidated building in front of the church. After finding these arrangements unsatisfactory, the town council decided to commission a dedicated town hall in the mid-1870s. The site they selected was on the northeast side of what became the Place de la Mairie (now Place de la Libération).

The building was designed in the neoclassical style, built in red brick with stone dressings and was officially opened by the mayor, Antoine Hippolyte Boyer, in 1886. The design involved a symmetrical main frontage of five bays facing onto the square. The central bay, which was clad in stone, featured a square headed doorway with a moulded surround and a keystone flanked by brackets supporting a balcony. There was a French door on the first floor and a casement window with a cornice at attic level. The attic level window was flanked by pilasters supporting an open pediment with a clock in the tympanum. The outer bays were fenestrated by casement windows with moulded surrounds and cornices on the ground and first floors, and by dormer windows at attic level. The old town hall later became the Jean Wiéner Conservatory.

After the Second World War, a plaque was installed in the town hall to commemorate the lives of two council employees, Marius Barbier et Henri Nozières, who were transported to their deaths in concentration camps. Bobigny station was the main departure point for people from France being transported to Auschwitz concentration camp. A second plaque recorded the names of 19 local people who served in the French Resistance.

In the late 1960s, following significant population growth, the town council led by the mayor, Georges Valbon, decided to commission a modern town hall. The site they selected was on the west side of Avenue du Président Salvador Allende. The new building was designed by Marius Depont in the modern style, built in concrete and glass and was officially opened in 1974. The structure was laid out in two parts: a triangular office block, sitting on a podium to the north, and a circular Salle du Conseil (council chamber) to the south. The upper five floors of the office block were clad with a series of moulded concrete shapes known as "claustras".

A new Salle des Mariages (wedding hall), decorated in vibrant colours to a design by one of the leaders of the "Figuration Libre" movement of French painters, Hervé Di Rosa, was completed in May 2006. A bronze bust depicting an African version of Marianne was created by Di Rosa, cast at a foundry in Cameroon, and installed in the room at around the same time.
