= Cross of the Resistance Volunteer Combatant =

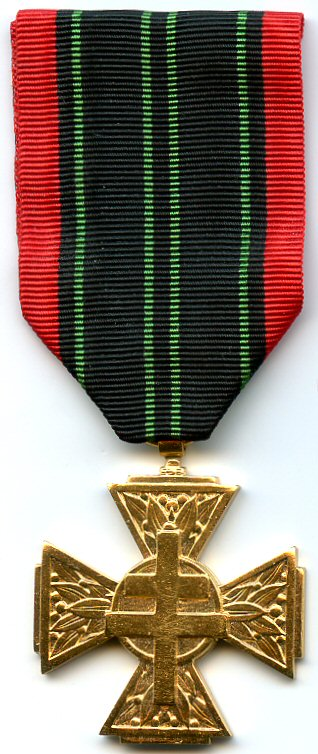
- Obverse of the Cross of the Resistance Volunteer Combatant
- Type: Service cross
- Awarded for: Volunteers for the Resistance during World War II
- Presented by: France
- Status: No longer awarded
- Established: 4 February 1953
- Ribbon of the Cross of the Resistance Volunteer Combatant Infobox

Precedence
- Next (higher): Volunteer combatant's cross
- Next (lower): Aeronautical Medal

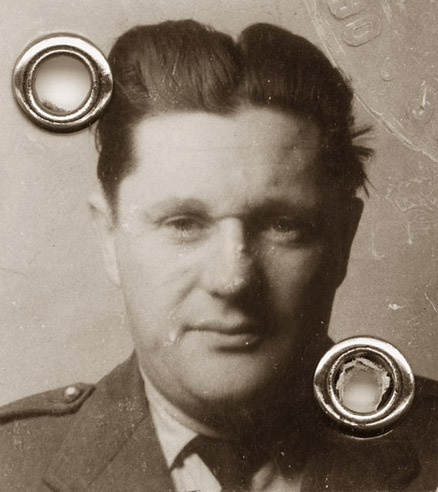
Resistance leader Roger Taillefer, a recipient of the Cross of the Resistance Volunteer Combatant

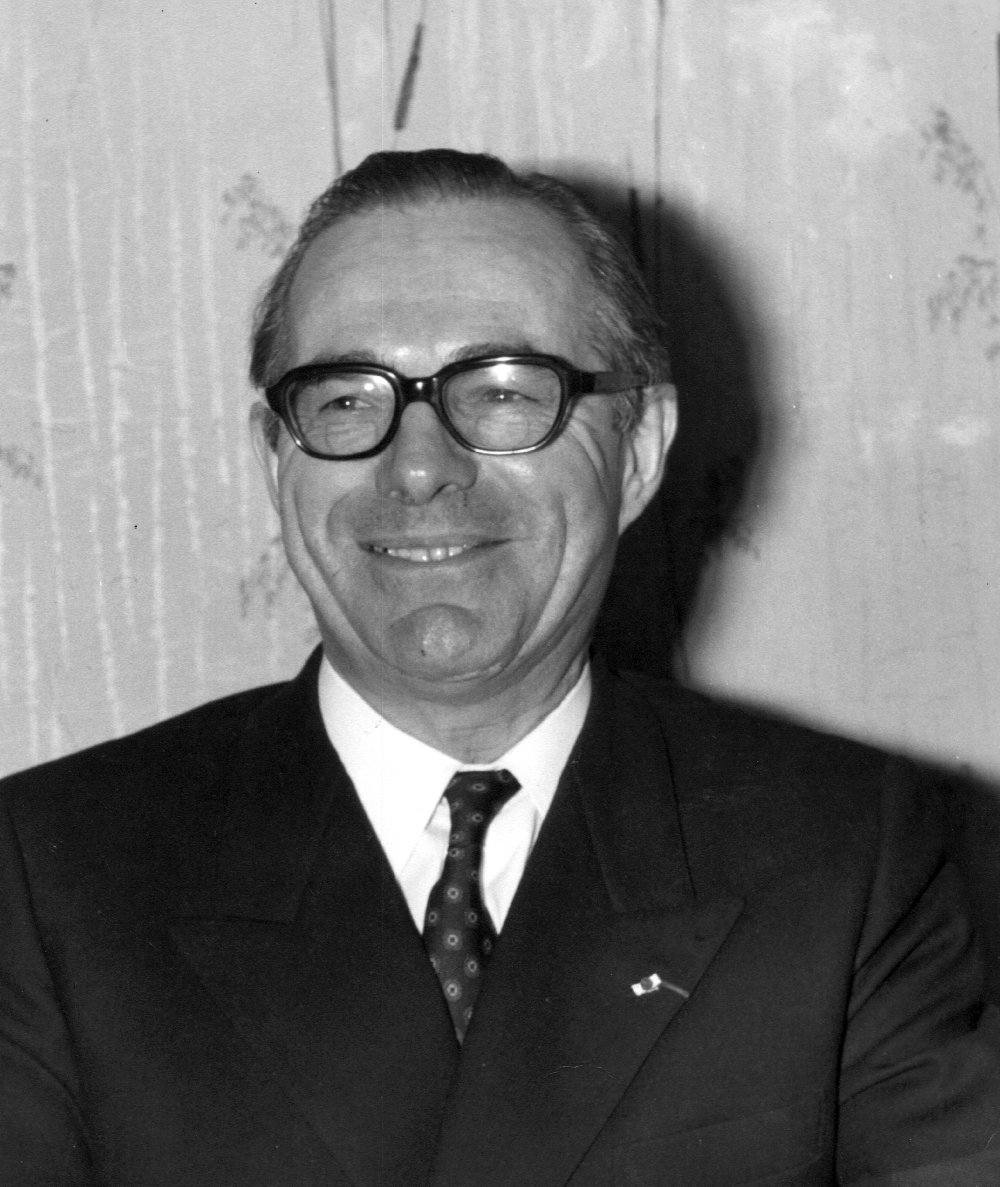
Resistance fighter Paul Rivière, a recipient of the Cross of the Resistance Volunteer Combatant

The Cross of the Resistance Volunteer Combatant (French: "Croix du combattant volontaire de la Résistance") is a French decoration that recognizes, as its name implies, those who fought in one of the resistance groups, or who were deported or interned for acts of resistance, or who were killed or injured while taking parts in acts of resistance against the German occupation forces during World War II. This award was created by a special law in 1954 and awarded to those who had been designated and issued cards certifying them as voluntary resistance fighters.

== Award statute ==
The Croix du combattant volontaire de la Résistance was created to honour those who voluntarily participated in acts of resistance, or by participating with a recognized resistance group, during which they put their lives at risk. It was issued to all cardholders of voluntary resistance fighter created in 1949, which itself is obtained using the following criteria:

- Holders of the a card Resistant-Deported or Interned-Resistant.
- Those executed, killed or injured in an act of resistance.
- Those who were members of a resistance group, recognized as a fighting unit and who actually fought at least 90 days in the French Forces Combattantes (FFC) or French Forces of the Interior ( FFI) or the French Resistance Interior (RFI).
- The people who have belonged for 90 days before June 6, 1944, the FFC, FFI, or RFI in an area occupied by the enemy, and have affidavits from two persons well known for their activity in the French Resistance.

The Croix du Combattant Volontaire de la Résistance is not considered a war decoration, but is taken into account when reviewing applications for, firstly, the Croix du combattant volontaire 1939–1945 and secondly, the rank of Chevalier of the Légion d'honneur (for quotas reserved for former resistance fighters).

A 1989 law removed all previously enacted time constraints for application of the status of resistance volunteer combatant.

== Award description ==
The Cross of the Resistance Volunteer Combatant, a design of engraver Frédéric de Vernon, is a 36 mm wide cross pattée made of gilt bronze. On the obverse, over the central medallion of the cross, a relief Cross of Lorraine overflowing onto the four cross arms which are covered in laurel leaves. On the reverse, the relief inscription on three lines on the central medallion COMBATTANT VOLONTAIRE RÉSISTANCE.

The cross is suspended by a ring through a suspension loop which is an integral part of the top of the upper cross arm. It hangs from a 36 mm wide black silk moiré ribbon with 5 mm wide red vertical edge stripes, it is further divided by four vertical 1 mm wide green stripes, two at centre spaced 2 mm apart and one on each side 2 mm from the red edge stripes.

== Notable recipients (partial list) ==
- Resistance fighter Paul Rivière
- Resistance leader captain André Girard
- Resistance leader Maxime Blocq-Mascart
- Resistance fighter Léon Weil
- Resistance leader Andrée Peel
- Lieutenant-colonel Marius Guyot
- Resistance fighter René Martin
- Master corporal André Verrier
- Resistance fighter Georges Toupet
- Father Maurice Cordier
- Resistance fighter Paul Gosset
- Junior lieutenant Louis Cortot
- Resistance fighter René Renard
- Filmmaker resistance fighter Jean Devaivre
- Jewish resistance fighter Yvette Lévy
- Resistance fighter Henri Gallet
- Resistance fighter Georges Caussanel
- Resistance leader Roger Taillefer
- Resistance fighter Didier Eloy
- Major Yves de Daruvar
- Resistance fighter Hélène Berthaud
- Hilaire du Berrier
- Resistance meeting manager Catherine Dior

== See also ==
- French Resistance
- Battle of France
- Free France
- Liberation of Paris
- Ribbons of the French military and civil awards
