= Bobigny station =

Railway station in Bobigny, France

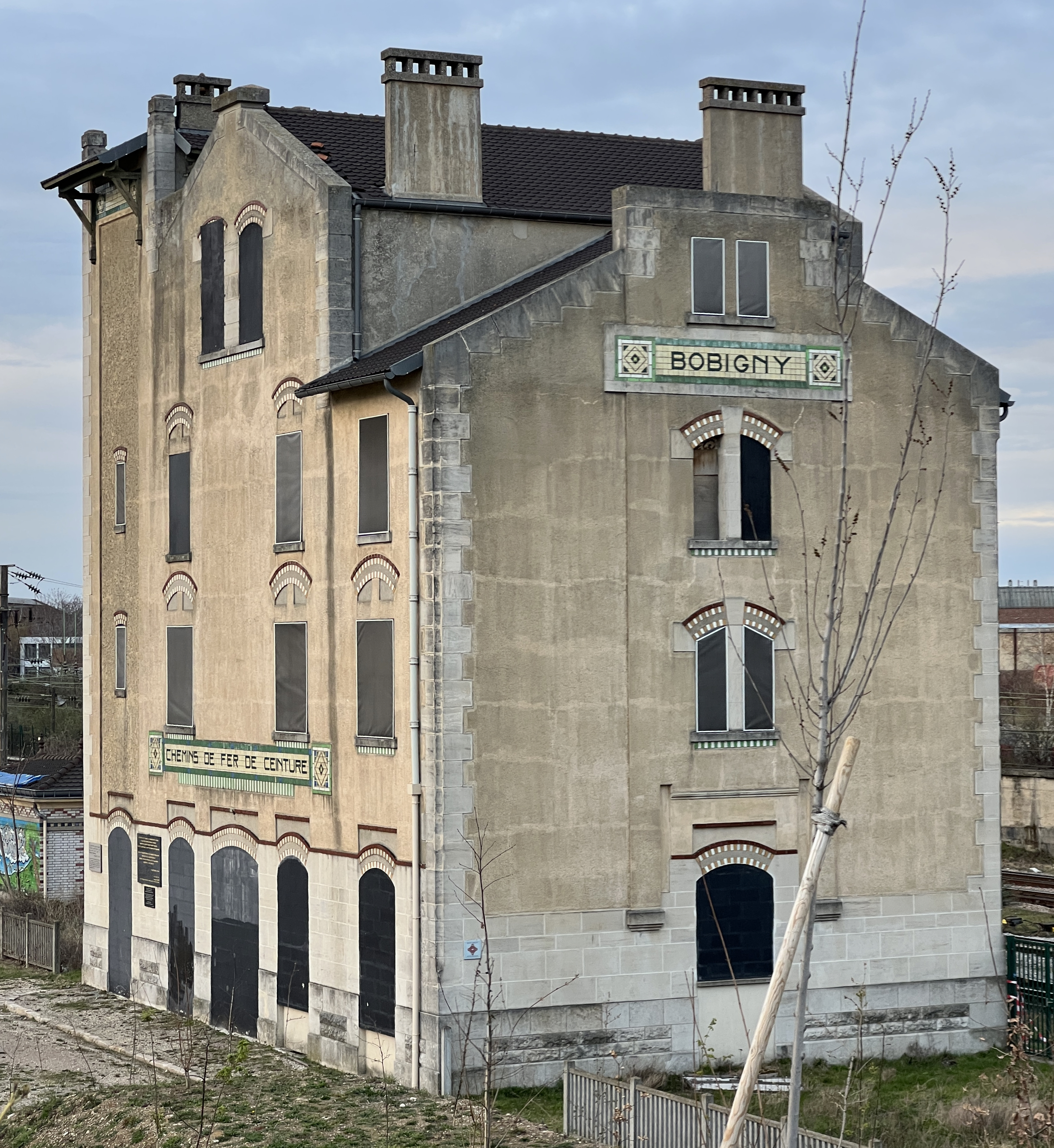
- The main building in March 2023

General information
- Location: Bobigny; Seine-Saint-Denis; France
- Coordinates: 48.9104°N 2.4301°E
- Owner: Town of Bobigny
- Line: Grande Ceinture line

History
- Opened: 1929
- Closed: 1939

Monument historique
- Official name: Ancienne gare SNCF de la Grande Ceinture
- Type: Inscrit
- Designated: 2005
- Reference no.: PA93000018
Location

Bobigny station is a railway station in the French commune of Bobigny in the département of Seine-Saint-Denis, France. Closed to passenger traffic from 1939, it was used as a departure point for people being transported from Drancy internment camp to Auschwitz concentration camp in Poland. It was designated a monument historique by the French government in 2005.

== History ==
The station started as a simple halt on the Grande Ceinture line between Achères et Noisy-le-Sec on 2 January 1882. It opened to freight traffic on 7 September 1928 and, after a proper station building had been constructed by contractors, Morosini, in 1929, it opened to passengers on 1 March 1932. The ground floor of the building accommodated the ticket office and waiting room, while the upper levels accommodated the living quarters of the railway staff. Passenger services ceased on 15 May 1939.

During the Second World War, between March 1942 and July 1943, Le Bourget station was used as the main departure point for people from France being transported from Drancy internment camp to Auschwitz concentration camp in Poland. However, from July 1943, the German authorities led by Alois Brunner, decided that Bobigny station would be more discreet and logistically better and therefore Bobigny station became the main departure point. Some 22,453 people were transported in 21 convoys from Bogigny station to the death camps. The last convoy was Convoy no. 77, which left on 31 July 1944, shortly before the liberation of Paris in August 1944.

For much of the post-war period the site was used as a metal scrapyard. However, in 2005, the town council of Bobigny acquired the site from SNCF for a nominal sum. Following the completion of extensive landscaping works, to a design by OKRA architects, the site re-opened in July 2023, as a memorial to the people who had been transported from the station to their deaths. The actor, Thierry Lhermitte, and two people who had survived the concentration camps were in attendance. The memorial incorporated 75 steles, symbolizing the 75,000 people transported from France, sculpted to a design by the historian, Thomas Fontaine.

== Sources ==
- Carrière, Bruno; Collardey, Bernard (2002). L'Aventure de la grande ceinture. La Vie du Rail. ISBN 978-2902808052.
