= Stephen Trombley =

American author, filmmaker and musician (born 1954)

- Born: December 8, 1954 (age 71); Star Lake, New York, U.S.
- Occupations: Author, filmmaker, musician
- Website: www.stephentrombleyproductions.com

Stephen Trombley (born December 8, 1954) is an American author, filmmaker and musician. He took British citizenship in 2003 and is a dual national. He is president of the independent film and television production company Worldview Pictures.

== Early life ==
Stephen Marshall Trombley was born in Star Lake, New York in 1954. He was raised in Ballston Spa, NY and graduated from the State University of New York at Plattsburgh in 1975 with a BA in English. He spent his junior year abroad at the University of Nottingham and returned there in 1975 to begin work on a PhD with Roger Poole. His thesis Virginia Woolf and her doctors was published in 1981 as 'All That Summer She Was Mad': Virginia Woolf and Her Doctors. He was tutor in English at Nottingham before moving to London in 1977, where he co-founded the literary review Books & Issues with Aidan Coen. He was deputy editor of the Royal Institute of British Architects Journal from 1980-1985 and launched the quarterly journal Architectural Education (now incorporated in RIBA Transactions). In 1985 he joined John Slater and David Starkey as a director of the independent television production company Mirageland.

== Filmmaker and producer ==
At Mirageland Trombley produced The Prince of Wales' ITV television special on community architecture, The Pride Factor. In addition to producing several documentaries at Mirageland, he also devised and wrote the young people's ITV network series Professor Lobster, and two seasons of Erasmus Microman. Naomie Harris, whom he cast in Erasmus Microman, went on to play Tia Dalma in two of the Pirates of the Caribbean films. Trombley's first international effort as a director was Caffe Lena, a film celebrating the life and coffeehouse of Lena Spencer who died in 1989. The film was broadcast on the BBC and as a PBS special. It starred Spalding Gray, Arlo Guthrie, Kate & Anna McGarrigle, David Bromberg, Utah Phillips, Rosalie Sorrels, Dave van Ronk, Rory Block, and David Amram.

In 1989 Trombley founded Worldview Pictures Ltd., an independent film and television production company in London. With Bruce Eadie as producer and co-writer, and Peter Miller as film editor, Trombley directed many documentary films of note including The Execution Protocol (1992), of which Vincent Canby of The New York Times said it "is not easy to sit through, but it touches nerves that force a rethinking of essential values. It is exceptionally well done." The Execution Protocol was the first of a trilogy that followed the story of condemned Missouri inmate A. J. Bannister, tracing his childhood, fall into crime, his conviction for a murder he claimed was self-defense, and his execution in 1997. The other films in the series are Raising Hell: The Life of A. J. Bannister (1995) and a death in the family (1999). Another trilogy explored aspects of the Holocaust, including its roots in eugenics. The Lynchburg Story (1993) looked at the sterilization of 8,000 young people in Virginia state institution. Drancy: A Concentration Camp in Paris 1941-1944 (1994) explored the mechanisms of French collaboration in the Holocaust; Le Monde wrote "the striking clarity of tone and hard-hitting evidence are blood chilling." Nuremberg (1996) told the story of the creation of the military tribunal that tried the Nazi war criminals. It won an Emmy Award in 1997 for Outstanding Historical Programming. In 1997 Worldview produced the eight-part television series War & Civilization based on the lifetime's work of military historian John Keegan, and narrated by Walter Cronkite. The New York Times called it "one of the most ambitious documentaries of recent years". In 1997 the Museum of Fine Arts, Boston honored Trombley with a month-long retrospective of five films, 'An Eye For Justice: Films by Stephen Trombley'. He then worked behind the fence at Los Alamos Nuclear Laboratory and on location at Arzamas-16, the secret Russian nuclear weapons center, to make the 2000 documentary Stockpile: The New Nuclear Menace, narrated by Martin Sheen. In 2003 Worldview Pictures moved to New York, becoming Worldview Pictures Corp. In 2010 he released Spitzer Uncut, a two-hour interview with former New York Governor Eliot Spitzer.

== Author ==
Trombley's first book was 'All That Summer She Was Mad': Virginia Woolf and Her Doctors (1981). It examined the work of eminent physicians who treated her and thought she was mad, contrasting their view with evidence from Woolf's fiction, letters, and diaries suggesting that what the doctors regarded as mad was her very self. While working as deputy editor of the RIBA Journal he edited, with Peter Murray, the guidebook Modern British Architecture since 1945 (1984). In 1988 Trombley published The Right to Reproduce: A History of Coercive Sterlization. In 1988 he also published the second edition of the Fontana Dictionary of Modern thought which he edited with Alan Bullock; a third, wholly revised edition appeared in 1999. The Guardian newspaper said that "For more than 20 years this book has been a bible for those struggling to remember the meaning of everything from Marxism to the Mormons." In 1989 Trombley published Sir Frederick Treves: The Extraordinary Edwardian (1989), and in 1992, The Execution Protocol: Inside America's Execution Industry. In 2012 Atlantic Books published Fifty Thinkers Who Shaped the Modern World, and A Short History of Western Thought.

== Musician and songwriter ==
Trombley worked as a singer/songwriter throughout the 1970s, but music took a back seat during the 1980s and 1990s. In 2006 he founded the rock band Psychoneedles with Chris Sauer. The band played regularly in upstate New York and New York City for two years. They released an eponymous CD in 2007 with songs written by Trombley and Sauer. In 2008 Trombley and Jay Kerr cowrote the musical entertainment "Adirondack Awakening", to celebrate the 400th anniversary of Henry Hudson's and Samuel de Champlain's exploration of that region. It was funded by the NYS Council on the Arts and premiered at the Fort Salem Theater in Salem, New York. In 2012, Trombley moved to Nashville, Tennessee after co-writing several songs with Angela Kaset, whom he met while she was staying in Vermont in 2011. Upon moving to Nashville he became a regular co-writer with Fred Koller, with whom he penned three of the tracks on his 2014 CD, Tea For Three. These include "Suzy Says", "Whaddya Know" and "I Know It's Summer". The title track, "Tea For Three", was written with Oliver Ray, formerly of Patti Smith's band. "One of These Days" and "Man Of The World" were written with Kaset. In 2013, Trombley and Koller composed the musical 1961, which looks at peace and prosperity in the fictional town of Pleasantville, US, in the years between the Korean and Vietnam wars.

== Stroke ==
In 2016, he moved to Brossac in southwestern France. In 2017 he suffered a series of heart attacks and strokes and was hospitalized in Angoulême. His right arm was paralyzed and he developed ataxia. He lost his physical and intellectual ability to write. He spent eight weeks in a stroke rehabilitation centre. He recounted the story of his stroke and its mental and physical effects in his memoir At a Stroke: Diary of a Recovery. His experience of stroke also informs his forthcoming trilogy of novels introducing Detective Inspector Bernard Rousseau. The novels are set in Paris during World War II.

== Honours and awards ==
In 2013, Trombley was elected a Fellow of the Royal Society of Arts.

== Filmography ==
- The Pride Factor (1985)
- Professor Lobster 6 x 30' (1987)
- Ermasmus Microman season one 6 x 30' (1988)
- The Battle For Stone Bassett (1988)
- Erasmus Microman season two 6 x 30' (1989)
- The Case of 'F' (1989)
- Caffe Lena (1991)
- The Execution Protocol (1992)
- The Lynchburg Story (1993)
- Drancy: A Concentration Camp in Paris 1941-1944 (1995)
- Raising Hell: The Life of A. J. Bannister (1995)
- Nuremberg (1996)
- Project X: The Castration Experiment (1998)
- War & Civilization 8 x 60' (1998)
- a death in the family (1999)
- 99% Woman (2000)
- Stockpile: The New Nuclear Menace (2001)
- Spitzer Uncut (2010)

== Bibliography ==
- Trombley, Stephen (October 1980). Virginia Woolf and her doctors (PDF) (PhD thesis). University of Nottingham.
- Trombley, Stephen (1981). All that Summer She was Mad: Virginia Woolf and Her Doctors. London: Junction Books. ISBN 978-0-86245-039-7.
- Modern British Architecture since 1945 ed. with Peter Murray (London 1984) (ISBN 978-0584400069)
- The Fontana Dictionary of Modern Thought, 2nd. ed. with Alan Bullock (1988) (ISBN 978-0006861294)
- Sir Frederick Treves: The Extraordinary Edwardian (London 1989) (ISBN 978-0415034234)
- The Right To Reproduce: A History of Coercive Sterilization (London 1989) (ISBN 978-0297792253)
- The Execution Protocol (London/New York 1992) (ISBN 978-0517591130)
- The New Fontana Dictionary of Modern Thought ed. with Alan Bullock (London 2000) (ISBN 978-0006863830)
- A Short History of Western Thought (London 2012)
- Fifty Thinkers Who Shaped the Modern World (London 2013)
- Wise Words: The Philosophy of Everyday Life (London 2016)
- At a Stroke: Diary of a Recovery (Brossac 2018)
