= Yvette Lévy =

French educator and survivor of the Holocaust (born 1926)

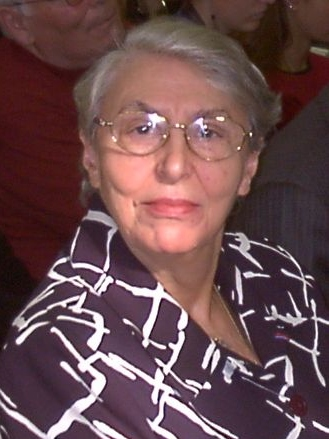
- Lévy in 2009
- Born: Yvette Henriette Dreyfuss; 21 June 1926 (age 100); Paris, France
- Occupation: Educator
- Awards: National Order of Merit; Legion of Honour

Yvette Henriette Lévy (née Dreyfuss; born 21 June 1926) is a French educator and survivor of the Holocaust. In July 1944, she was arrested by the Gestapo and was eventually sent to Auschwitz concentration camp. She survived and now educates youths about her experiences. Lévy is a Commander of the National Order of Merit and Officer of the Legion of Honour.

== Early life ==
Yvette Henriette Dreyfuss was born on 21 June 1926 in the 11th arrondissement of Paris to Jewish parents. She grew up with her two brothers in Noisy-le-Sec. At a young age, Lévy participated as a scout in the Eclaireuses et Eclaireurs israélites de France (EIF). Following the German bombing of Noisy-le-Sec, the family moved back to Paris, where Lévy stayed at an orphanage. At 16 years old, she worked for the Union générale des israélites de France (UGIF, General Organization of Jews in France), where she took in Jewish children whose parents were deported as a result of the German invasion of France and the subsequent Vel' d'Hiv Roundup.

== Arrest ==
On the night of 21 July 1944, Lévy was arrested by the Gestapo for her involvement with the UGIF. She and 33 other girls were sent to Drancy internment camp. Ten days later, Lévy, along with 1321 other prisoners, was sent from Drancy to Auschwitz-Birkenau concentration camp on convoy 77.

From Auschwitz, she was sent to work at the Kratzau ammunition factory in modern-day Chrastava, Czech Republic.

== Post-war ==
After her liberation in May 1945, Lévy returned to her parents and two brothers in Noisy-le-Sec, who had managed to survive the Nazi occupation in hiding because she had explicitly told the Gestapo that they had died in a bombing. She then married Robert Lévy, a Jewish publisher, and had a daughter named Martine.

In 2009, Lévy signed a petition in support of film director Roman Polanski, calling for his release after Polanski was arrested in Switzerland in relation to his 1977 charge for drugging and raping a 13-year-old girl.

Lévy spends her time going to schools and events to educate students about the Holocaust. Since her release, she has returned to Auschwitz over two hundred times with students, teaching them about her experiences at the camp. Lévy spoke at the ceremony remembering the 70th anniversary of the Vel' d'Hiv Roundup.

She is a member of the Fédération nationale des déportés et internés résistants et patriotes (FNDIRP).

== Awards ==
On 10 May 1995, Lévy was named a Knight of the National Order of Merit. Her rank was upgraded to that of an Officer on 14 November 2005. Lévy became a Commander on 15 November 2018, and received her insignia at a ceremony on 30 April 2019, from Minister of National Education Jean-Michel Blanquer.

Lévy is also a recipient of the Legion of Honour; receiving the honour on 2 April 1999, and becoming an Officer on 31 December 2010.

She has also been awarded the Médailles des Anciens Combattants, Medal of the Nation's Gratitude, and Cross of the resistance volunteer combatant.
