= Bobigny =

- Prefecture and commune
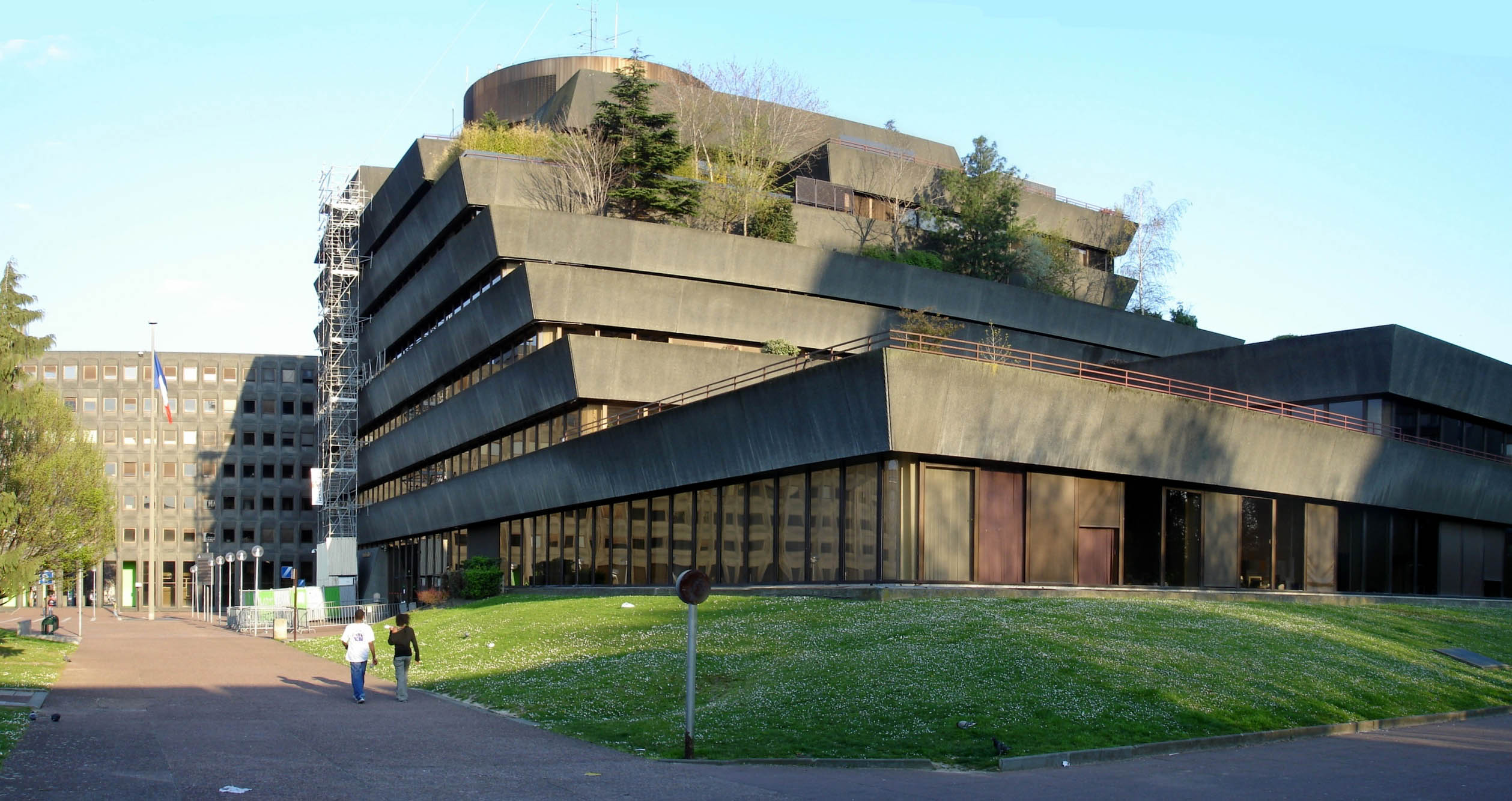
- Prefecture building

- Coat of arms

- Location (in red) within Paris inner suburbs
- Location of Bobigny
- Location within France Location within Île-de-France (region)
- Coordinates: 48°54′38″N 2°26′23″E
- Country: France
- Region: Île-de-France
- Department: Seine-Saint-Denis
- Arrondissement: Bobigny
- Canton: Bobigny and Bondy
- Intercommunality: Grand Paris

Government
  - Mayor (2026–32): Abdel Sadi
- Area^{1}: 6.77 km^{2} (2.61 sq mi)
- Elevation: 45 m (148 ft)
- Highest elevation: 57 m (187 ft)
- Lowest elevation: 39 m (128 ft)
- Population (2023): 56,927
  - Density: 8,410/km^{2} (21,800/sq mi)
- Demonym: Balbyniens
- Time zone: UTC+01:00 (CET)
  - Summer (DST): UTC+02:00 (CEST)
- INSEE/Postal code: 93008 /93000
- ^{1} French Land Register data, which excludes lakes, ponds, glaciers > 1 km^{2} (0.386 sq mi or 247 acres) and river estuaries.

Bobigny (French pronunciation: [bɔbiɲi]) is a commune, or town, in the northeastern suburbs of Paris, Île-de-France, France. It is located 9.1 km (5.7 mi) from the centre of Paris. Bobigny is the prefecture (capital city) of the Seine-Saint-Denis department, as well as the seat of the Arrondissement of Bobigny. It is the 9th most populous commune in Seine-Saint-Denis (2023).

Inhabitants are called Balbyniens in French. The first IKEA store in France was located in this commune.

== Urbanism ==
=== Typology ===
Bobigny is an urban commune, as it is one of the dense or intermediate density communes, as defined by the Insee communal density grid. (Note: According to the zoning of rural and urban municipalities published in November 2020, in application of the new definition of rurality validated on November 14, 2020 by the Interministerial Committee for Rural Areas.) It belongs to the urban unit of Paris, an inter-departmental conurbation comprising 407 communes and 10,785,092 inhabitants in 2017, of which it is a suburban commune.

The commune is also part of the functional area of Paris (Note: In October 2020, the concept of functional area replaced that of urban area in order to enable consistent comparisons with other European Union countries) where it is located in the main population and employment centre of the functional area. This area comprises 1,929 communes.

=== Transport ===
Bobigny is served by two stations on Paris Métro Line 5: Bobigny – Pantin – Raymond Queneau and Bobigny – Pablo Picasso. It can also be reached from the outer terminus of Paris Métro Line 7 at La Courneuve.

== Economy ==
Valeo has management branches (Valeo Transmissions group and Valeo Friction Materials group) here. It was also the manufacturing base used by Meccano for French Dinky Toys from 1933 until 1970, when the factory was closed and later demolished. Production of Dinky Toys was then transferred to the Meccano factory in Calais until 1972, when the last new model, a Renault 4 la poste, was produced.

== Toponymy ==
Its name is derived from Roman-period Balbiniacum, "the place of Balbo or Balbinus or Balbinius"; or "of the dumb or silent man/men" (Gaulish: Irish Gaelic balbh = "dumb, silent").

== History ==
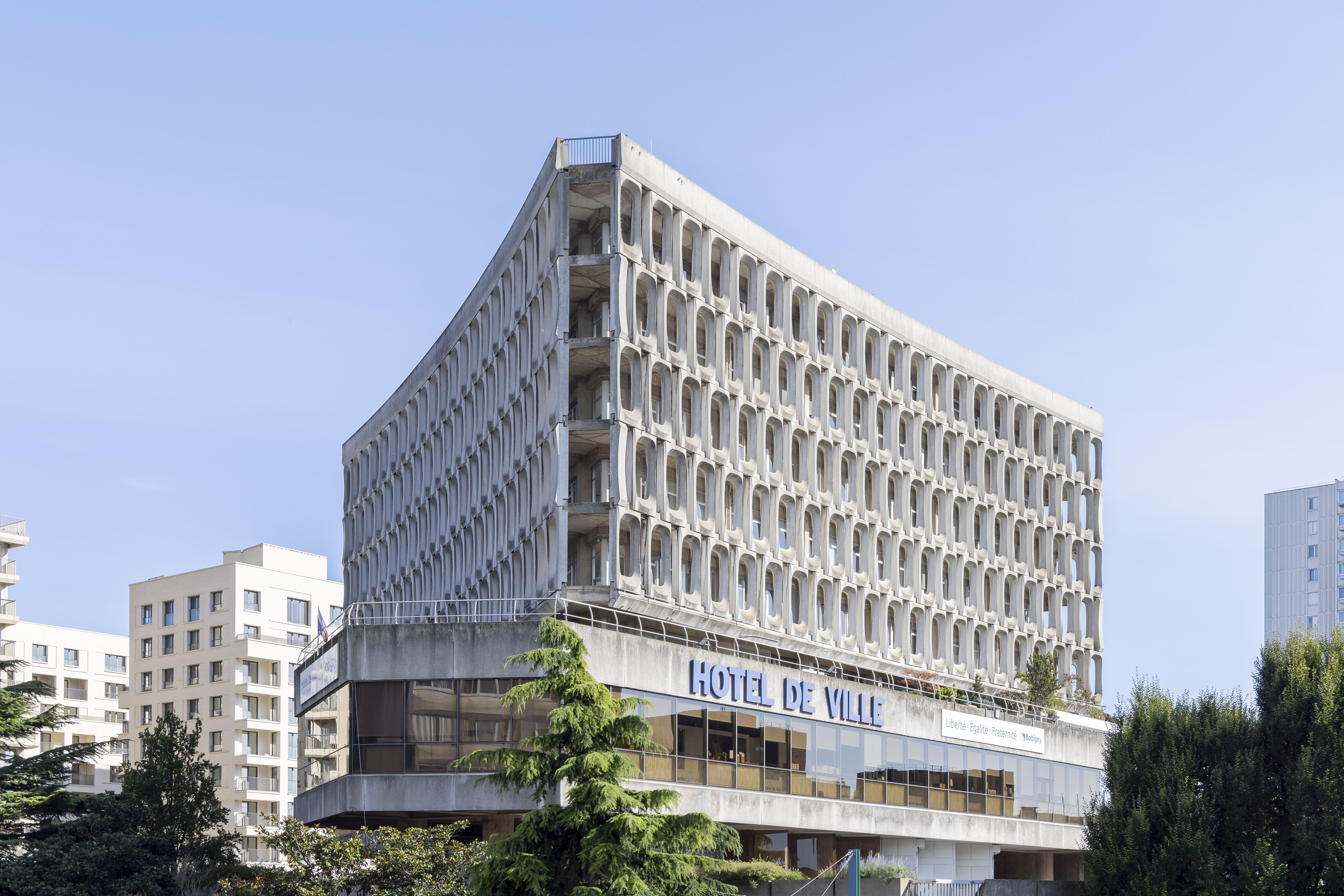
The Hôtel de Ville

During the Second World War, approximately 20,000 jews were transported from Bobigny station to their deaths in Nazi concentration camps.

The Hôtel de Ville was completed in 1974.

== Population ==
Historical population

Year	Pop.	±% p.a.
1793	260	—
1821	231	−0.42%
1846	353	+1.71%
1856	363	+0.28%
1861	561	+9.10%
1866	910	+10.16%
1872	889	−0.39%
1876	972	+2.26%
1881	1,173	+3.83%
1886	1,335	+2.62%
1891	1,540	+2.90%
1896	1,678	+1.73%
1901	1,946	+3.01%
1906	2,438	+4.61%
1911	3,660	+8.46%
1921	6,757	+6.32%

Year	Pop.	±% p.a.
1926	11,412	+11.05%
1931	17,370	+8.76%
1936	17,676	+0.35%
1946	16,547	−0.66%
1954	18,521	+1.42%
1962	37,010	+9.04%
1968	39,453	+1.07%
1975	43,125	+1.28%
1982	42,723	−0.13%
1990	44,659	+0.56%
1999	44,079	−0.15%
2007	48,196	+1.12%
2012	48,496	+0.12%
2017	53,640	+2.04%
2023	56,927	+1.00%

Source: EHESS and INSEE (1968-2023)

== List of mayors ==
Start	End	Name	Party
1944	1955	Léon Pesch	PCF
1955	1965	René Guesnier	PCF
1965	1995	Georges Valbon	PCF
1995	2006	Bernard Birsinger	PCF
2006	2014	Catherine Peyge	PCF
2014	2020	Stéphane de Paoli	UDI
2020	2032	Abdel Sadi	PCF

== Education ==
The commune has 14 public preschools (écoles maternelles), 15 public elementary schools, four public junior high schools, three public senior high schools/sixth-form colleges, and one private school.

- Junior high schools: Collège Auguste Delaune, Collège Jean-Pierre Timbaud, Collège Pierre Sémard, and Collège République et SEGPA
- Senior high/Sixth-form: Lycée professionnel Alfred Costes, Lycée Louise Michel, Lycée polyvalent André Sabatier
- École, collège et lycée Charles Péguy is a private school from elementary to senior high/sixth-form

There is also a school of hotel management, École hôtelière de Bobigny.

The Bobigny campus of Paris 13 University is its second-largest. It focuses on the medical sciences, and hosts a strong medical degree.

== Personalities ==
Bobigny is the birthplace of:

- Charles Itandje (born 1982), football goalkeeper
- Gaël Monfils, tennis player
- Valentin Courrent, rugby player
- Odsonne Edouard, football player

Bobigny is the place of death of:

• Jacques Brel, Belgian singer-songwriter.

== Heraldry ==
Arms of Bobigny	The arms of Bobigny are blazoned : Or, a saltire gules, overall on an inescutcheon azure, a basket filled with fruit and flowers and topped with 7 ears of wheat argent. The village of Bobigny was under Saint Andrew, hence the cross of Saint Andrew (saltire). The small shield in the middle evokes the agricultural nature of the commune, before the spread of built-up Paris surrounded it.

== International relations ==
Bobigny is twinned with:

- Serpukhov, Moscow Oblast (Russia)
- Potsdam, Brandenburg (Germany)

== See also ==
- Communes of the Seine-Saint-Denis department
- Bobigny cemetery
