= Drancy internment camp =

Internment camp for Jews in occupied France during World War II

Coordinates: 48°55′12″N 2°27′18″E

Drancy
- Transit camp
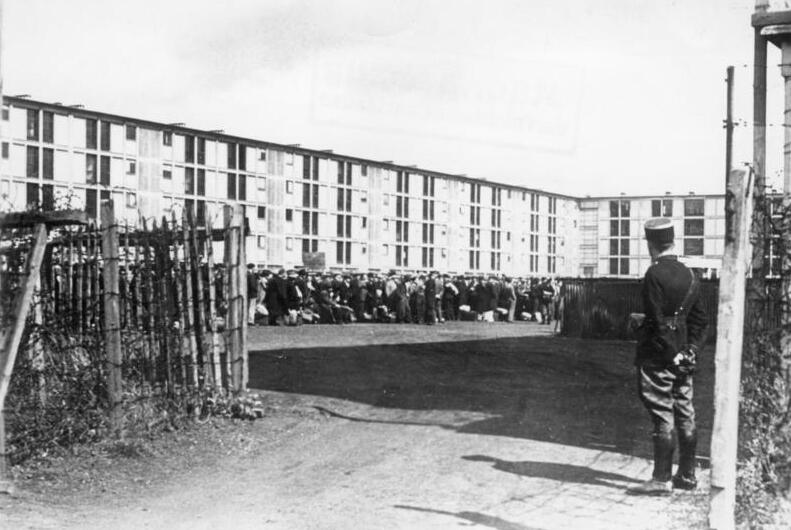
- The accommodation block at Drancy with French policeman on guard

- Location within France
- Location: Drancy, France
- Operated by: French police (until 1943); Nazi Germany
- Commandant: Theodor Dannecker; Alois Brunner
- Original use: Utopian urban community
- Operational: 20 August 1941 – 17 August 1944
- Inmates: French, Polish, Czechoslovak, and German Jews
- Number of inmates: 67,400 deported; 1,542 remaining at liberation
- Liberated by: French Resistance (indirectly Western Allies, mainly the United Kingdom and United States)
- Notable inmates: Tristan Bernard, Eduard Bloch, René Blum, Max van Dam, Max Jacob, Charlotte Salomon, Simone Veil, Jean Wahl
- Website: http://drancy.memorialdelashoah.org/en/

Drancy internment camp (French: Camp d'internement de Drancy) was an assembly and detention camp for confining Jews who were later deported to the extermination camps during the German occupation of France during World War II. Originally conceived and built as a modernist urban community under the name La Cité de la Muette (lit. 'The City of the Mute'), it was located in Drancy, a northeastern suburb of Paris, France.

Between 22 June 1942 and 31 July 1944, during its use as an internment camp, 67,400 French, Polish, and German Jews were deported from the camp in 64 rail operations, which included 6,000 children. Only 1,542 prisoners remained alive at the camp when the German authorities in Drancy fled as Allied forces advanced and the Swedish Consul-General Raoul Nordling took control of the camp on 17 August 1944, before handing it over to the French Red Cross to care for the survivors.

Drancy was under the control of the French police until 1943 when administration was taken over by the SS, which placed officer Alois Brunner in charge of the camp. In 2001, Brunner's case was brought before a French court by Nazi hunter Serge Klarsfeld, which sentenced Brunner (by then living in Syria) in absentia to a life sentence for crimes against humanity.

== Operational history ==
After the 1940 defeat by Germany and 10 July 1940 vote of full powers to Marshal Philippe Pétain, the Republic was abolished and Vichy France was proclaimed. The Vichy government cooperated with Nazi Germany, hunting down foreign and French Jews and turning them over to the Gestapo for transport to the Third Reich's extermination camps.

The Drancy internment camp became identified by the northeastern suburb of Paris in which it was located. It was originally conceived by the noted architects Marcel Lods and Eugène Beaudouin as a striking, modernist urban community. The design was especially noteworthy for its integration of high-rise residential apartment towers, among the first of their kind in France. Poetically named La Cité de la Muette ("The Silent City") at its creation for its perceived peaceful ideals, the name became twisted with bitterly ironic meaning. The entire complex was confiscated by Nazi authorities not long after the German occupation of France in 1940. It was used first as police barracks, then converted into the primary detention center in the Paris region for holding Jews and other people labeled as "undesirable" before deportation.

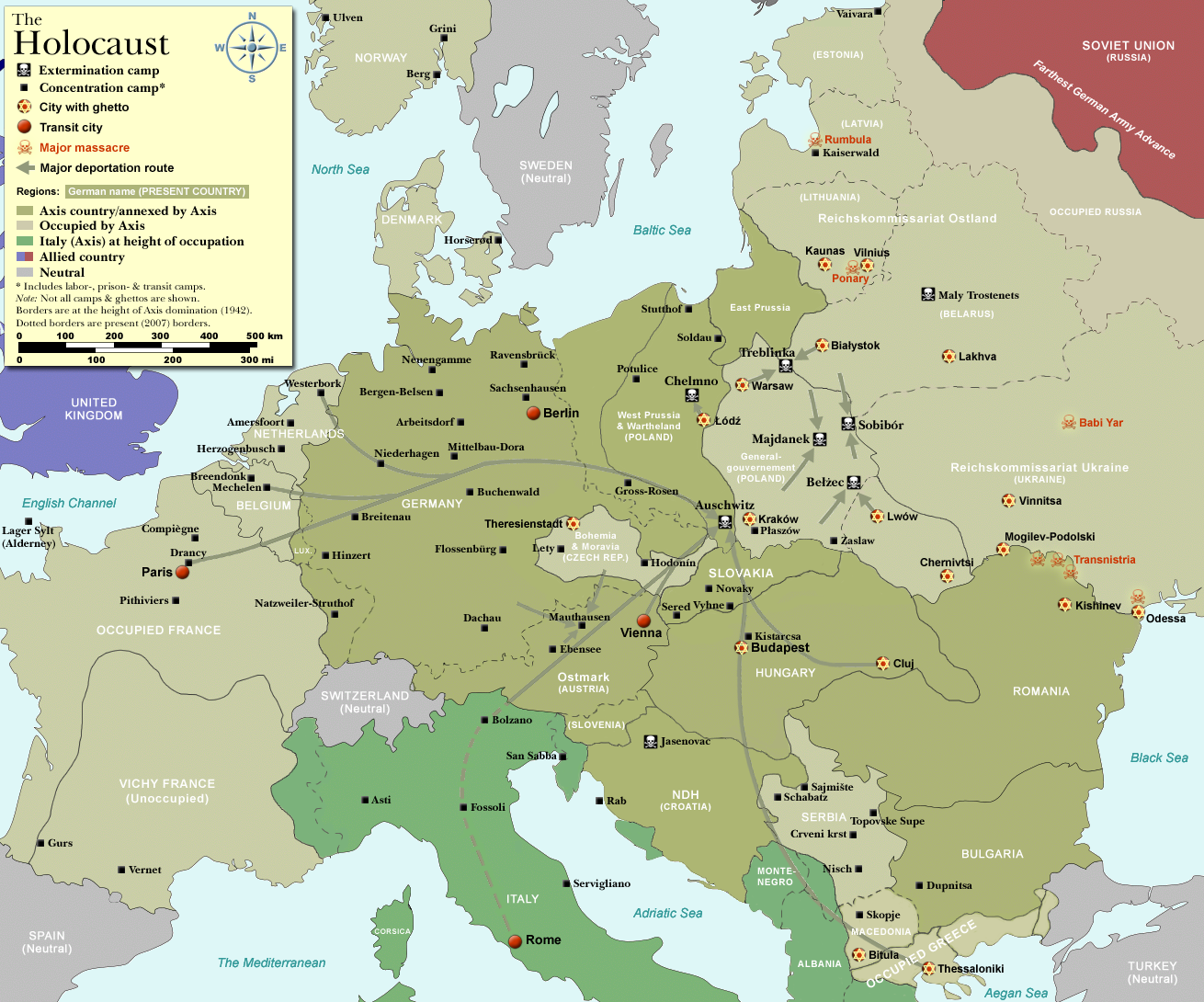
Map of Holocaust sites, with the Drancy camp and routes by Paris

On 20 August 1941, French police conducted raids throughout the 11th arrondissement of Paris and arrested more than 4,000 Jews, mainly foreign or stateless Jews. French authorities interned these Jews in Drancy, marking its official opening. French police enclosed the barracks and courtyard with barbed-wire fencing and provided guards for the camp. Drancy fell under the command of the Gestapo Office of Jewish Affairs in France and German SS Captain Theodor Dannecker. Five subcamps of Drancy were located throughout Paris (three of which were the Austerlitz, Lévitan and Bassano camps). Following the Vel' d'Hiv Roundup on 16 and 17 July 1942, more than 4,900 of the 13,152 victims of the mass arrest were sent directly to the camp at Drancy before their deportation to Auschwitz.

Drancy was under the control of the French police until 3 July 1943 when Germany took direct control of the Drancy camp. SS officer Alois Brunner became camp commandant as part of the major stepping up at all facilities needed for mass extermination. The French police carried out additional roundups of Jews throughout the war. Some Drancy inmates died as hostage pawns. In December 1941, 40 prisoners from Drancy were executed in retaliation for a French attack on German police officers.

In November 1943 around 350 inmates of the Borgo San Dalmazzo concentration camp in Italy were deported by train to Drancy and, soon after, on to Auschwitz. The inmates from Borgo, Jewish refugees from a number of European countries, had been arrested after the Italian surrender in September 1943, having mostly come to Italy from France in search for safety from Nazi prosecution.

== Prisoners ==
Jews at Drancy in 1941

The Drancy camp was designed to hold 700 people, but at its peak held more than 7,000. There is documented evidence and testimony recounting the brutality of the French guards in Drancy and the harsh conditions imposed on the inmates. For example, upon their arrival, small children were immediately separated from their parents for deportation to the death camps.

On 6 April 1944, SS First Lieutenant Klaus Barbie raided a children's home in Izieu, France, where Jewish children had been hidden. Barbie arrested everyone present, all 44 children and 7 adult staff members. The next day, the Gestapo transported the arrestees to Drancy. From there, all the children and staff were deported to Auschwitz. None of the children survived.

Weill, Théodore Valensi, Azoulay, Albert Ulmo, Cremieux, Eduard Bloch and Pierre Massé held at Drancy in 1941

Many French Jewish intellectuals and artists were held in Drancy, including Max Jacob (who died there), Tristan Bernard, and the choreographer René Blum. Of the 75,000 Jews whom French and German authorities deported from France, more than 67,000 were sent directly from Drancy to Auschwitz. Jewish-Dutch painter Max van Dam, captured in France en route to Switzerland, was briefly incarcerated in Drancy where he was able to paint and create print work. He was among the 1008 deportees on Transport 53 which left Drancy, on 25 March 1943, with the final destination of Sobibor. Van Dam was spared upon arrival and survived for six months painting for the SS but was murdered in September 1943. Jewish Austrian footballer Max Scheuer was sent to Drancy, and then on to Auschwitz concentration camp, where he was murdered in the early 1940s.

There were also many non-French Jews captured in France and deported to Drancy to await final deportation to Auschwitz and other death camps. They included the noted German artist Charlotte Salomon, who had lived in the south of France after fleeing from the Nazis in Germany. By September 1943, Charlotte Salomon had married another German Jewish refugee, Alexander Nagler. The two of them were dragged from their house and transported by rail from Nice to Drancy. By now, Charlotte Salomon was five months pregnant. She was transported to Auschwitz on 7 October 1943 and was probably murdered by gas on the same day that she arrived there (10 October). Polish writer Eva Kotchever was also deported to Drancy before her murder in Auschwitz.

The prisoners dug a tunnel to escape, but it was discovered before completion. A TV documentary was made about the attempt.

As the Allies were approaching Paris in August 1944, the German officers fled, and the camp was liberated on 17 August when control of the camp was given over to the French Resistance and Swedish diplomat Raoul Nordling.

== Present-day ==
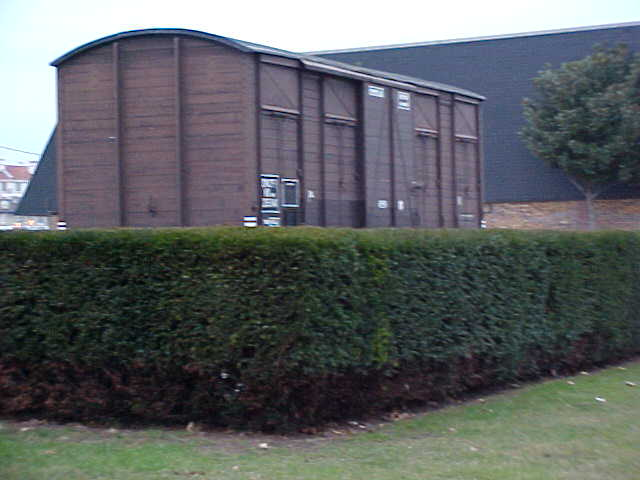
A railway wagon used to carry internees to Auschwitz and now displayed at Drancy

The camp was used after the war for the internment of collaborationists, then went back in 1946 to its original designation as low-income housing. In 1977, the Memorial to the Deportation at Drancy was created by sculptor Shelomo Selinger to commemorate the French Jews imprisoned in the camp.

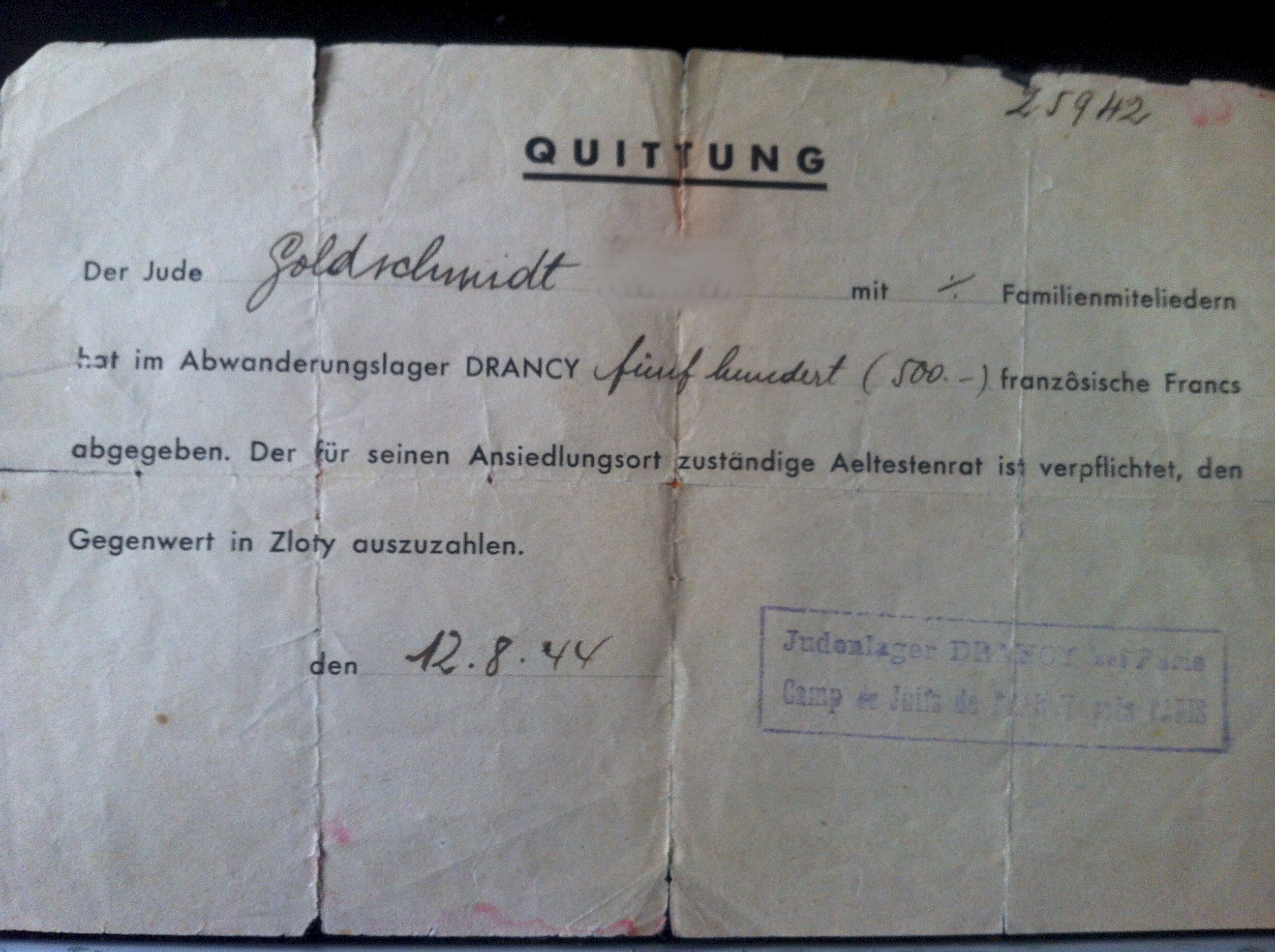
Receipt for French francs taken from Jewish inmate at Drancy, stating that "the Aeltestenrat [Council of Elders] at the new place of settlement is under obligation to (re)pay its countervalue in [Polish] zloty"

Charles de Gaulle among others, held the view that the Vichy Regime was illegal. This view was underlined by the July 1940 vote giving full powers to Marshal Pétain, who installed the "French State" and repudiated the Republic. With only the Vichy 80 refusing this vote, historians have argued it was anti-Constitutional, most notably because of pressure on parliamentarians from Pierre Laval. However, on 16 July 1995, president Jacques Chirac, in a speech, recognized the responsibility of the French State, and in particular of the French police which organized the Vel' d'Hiv Roundup (Rafle du Vel' d'Hiv) of July 1942, for seconding the "criminal folly of the occupying country".

On 20 January 2005, arsonists set fire to some railroad freight cars in the former camp; a tract signed "Bin Laden" with an inverted swastika was found.

On 11 April 2009, a swastika was painted on a train car used for the deportation of Jews, a permanent exhibit. This was condemned by the French Minister for the Interior, Michèle Alliot-Marie.

== New museum ==
A new Shoah memorial museum designed by Swiss architect Roger Diener was opened in September 2012 just opposite the sculpture memorial and railway wagon by the President of France, François Hollande. It provides details of the persecution of the Jews in France and many personal mementos of inmates before their deportation to Auschwitz and their death. They include messages written on the walls, many graffiti, aluminium drinking mugs and other personal belongings left by the prisoners, some of which are inscribed with the names of the owners.

The archive also includes the cards and letters written by the prisoners to their relatives before deportation, and they are a moving contribution to the memory of the camp, and the crime of their detention. The ground floor shows a changing exhibit of prisoners' faces and names, as a memorial to their imprisonment and murder by the Nazis, assisted by the gendarmerie of Occupied France.

== Documentary films ==
- Drancy: A Concentration Camp in Paris 1941–1944, Worldview Pictures, 1994.
- Drancy Avenir, 1997.

== Literature ==
Nicolas Grenier, Cité de la Muette (poem), in honor of Max Jacob, who died in the Drancy camp, 2011.

The concentration camp also featured in a part of Sebastian Faulks' 1999 novel Charlotte Gray. The character of Levade was an inmate here, as well as young brothers André and Jacob Duguay. Charlotte was staying at a small hotel nearby to try and pass on a message to Levade.

Journal d'Hélène Berr, Editions Tallandier, 2008, (English translation Journal Hélène Berr, MacLehose Press, 2008 and 2009). Berr was a young French Jewish graduate who kept a diary between April 1942 and February 1944. She was beaten to death, suffering typhus, five days before the camp was liberated. She worked in Paris to save Jewish children by escorting them to the Free Zone.

Andre Schwarz-Bart's The Last of the Just uses as reference De Drancy a Auschwitz, by Georges Wellers.

== See also ==
- Convoy n° 77 of July 31, 1944
