= Worldview Pictures =

Independent film and television production company

- Type: Film & television production
- Industry: TV/Film
- Founded: 1989
- Headquarters: New York
- Key people: Stephen Trombley, president

Worldview Pictures is an independent film and television production company founded in 1989. Its work includes single documentary films such as the Emmy Award winning Nuremberg and the eight-part television series War & Civilization narrated by Walter Cronkite. In 2010 the company's production slate expanded to include science and lifestyle factual entertainment.

== Company history ==
Worldview Pictures was founded by Stephen Trombley in 1989. The company was headquartered in London, England until 2003, when it moved its operations to New York City. The company's first theatrical release was The Execution Protocol (1992), which The New York Times compared to Frederick Wiseman's Titicut Follies . It won Germany's top prize the Adolf Grimme Award along with many other honors. In 1994 Bruce Eadie joined Worldview as producer and managing director. Together with Trombley, he was responsible for over a dozen films and television series in the period 1994–2001. Their first collaboration was The Lynchburg Story (1993), on the forced sterilization of 8,000 children at a Virginia state facility. This was followed by Drancy: A Concentration Camp in Paris 1941-1944, an account of French government complicity in the deportation of 72,500 Jews to Nazi death camps. Raising Hell (1995) is an account of the life of A. J. Bannister, a Missouri death row inmate who had featured in The Execution Protocol. Research gathered in the making of the film led to a last-minute stay of execution. Nuremberg (1996) marked the 50th anniversary of the Nuremberg Trials. Told exclusively from the points of view of participants in the trials, it won an Emmy for Outstanding Historical Programming in 1997. Also in 1997 War & Civilization, an 8-part series narrated by Walter Cronkite, aired on The Leaning Channel. Martin Sheen narrated Worldview Pictures’ 2001 feature, Stockpile: The New Nuclear Menace, which is the result of two years of research “inside the fence” at Los Alamos Nuclear Laboratory and the Russian nuclear city of Arzamas-16 (Sarov). In 2008 Worldview moved into theatrical production with the musical review Adirondack Awakening. In 2010 it released the DVD Spitzer Uncut, an interview with Stephen Trombley that explores the childhood, education, and political career of the former governor of New York.

== Filmography and awards ==
- The Execution Protocol (1992) Adolf Grimme Award, Best Documentary, 1994; Silver Hugo Award, Chicago International Film Festival 1992; nominated Grierson Award for best documentary, British Film Institute Awards 1992; Sesterce d'Argent, Festival International du Film Documentaire, Nyon, 1992.
- The Lynchburg Story (1993) Certificate of Merit, San Francisco Film Festival Golden Gate Awards 1994; Banff Television Festival 1994.
- Drancy: A Concentration Camp in Paris 1941-1944 CableACE Award, 1995; USA Film Festival 1995.
- Raising Hell: The Life of A. J. Bannister (1995) Silver Plaque, Chicago Film Festival 1995; International Documentary Film Festival, Amsterdam, 1995.
- Nuremberg (1996) Emmy Award Outstanding Historical Programming category (1997)
- Project X: The Castration Experiment (1998)
- War & Civilization 8 x 60' (1998) Gold World Medal, New York Festivals, 1999.
- a death in the family (1999)
- 99% Woman (2000)
- Stockpile: The New Nuclear Menace (2001) Hollywood Film Festival 2001.
- Spitzer Uncut (2010)
- Sigrid Close: Space Investigator. 8 x 44' popular science series.
