= Le Nouveau Détective =

French weekly Détective magazine created in 1928

- Editor-in-chief: Julie Rigoulet
- Categories: News magazine
- Frequency: Weekly
- Publisher: Éditions Nuit et Jour (Burda Bleu)
- Total circulation: 69 686 (2025)
- Founded: 1928
- First issue: 1 November 1928; 98 years ago
- Company: Hubert Burda Media Holding
- Country: France
- Based in: Montrouge
- Language: French
- Website: www.lenouveaudetective.com
- ISSN: 0753-4000

Le Nouveau Détective (lit. 'The New Detective') is a French magazine published weekly by Éditions Nuit et Jour (lit. 'Night and Day Edition'), a subsidiary of Hubert Burda Media Holding. It originated in 1925, when Henri La Barthe created Détective, a publication aimed at crime professionals. The journal was converted into a true crime magazine by Gaston Gallimard and his partners: the brothers Georges and Joseph Kessel, Maurice Garçon, Paul Bringuier, Louis Roubaud, and La Barthe. Détective was the first weekly magazine dedicated to true crime stories to appear in France.

The first French magazine to use rotogravure printing, it was published on 1 November 1928 and met with immediate success, reaching a circulation of 800,000 copies in 1929. Édouard Séné was the first editor-in-chief. Georges ran Détective for eighteen months, and Joseph worked as a journalist until 1931. Marius Larique succeeded Joseph and assembled a team of contributors, the most regular of whom were Francis Carco and Pierre Mac Orlan. Détective featured fiction, novels, short stories, investigations, reportage, and photographs, while engaging in romanticisation, favouring sensationalism and espousing strong stances. The magazine covered crimes, kidnappings, rapes, and prostitution. Détective has often been criticised, notably by Louis Aragon. Détective went into a steady decline following the 6 February 1934 crisis and began covering political and social issues, while Gallimard struggled to maintain it financially until its suspension at the outbreak of the Second World War.

It was published as Qui? Détective (lit. 'Who? Detective') in 1946 and was acquired by Éditions Nuit et Jour (Beyler group). The drawer Angelo Di Marco then joined the team. In 1958, the magazine reverted to its original name, Détective. The magazine ramped up sensationalism in the 1970s, sparking public outrage in 1978 with questionable articles and an advertising campaign featuring indecent poster headlines, which led to two bans ordered by the Minister of the Interior. In 1979, the magazine's name was changed to Qui? Police.

In 1982, it was renamed Le Nouveau Détective, adopted a new graphic charter, and reconnected with the rudiments of investigative journalism. In 1995, Catherine Nemo acquired Le Nouveau Détective from Beyler. The magazine's journalistic methods landed the team in legal problems during the investigation into the murder of Grégory Villemin. Julie Rigoulet is the current editor-in-chief.

== History ==
=== Professional journal ===
In the mid-1920s, the Paris-based detective Henri La Barthe, also known by the pseudonym " Ashelbé" (HLB), founded his cabinet, the International Detective Company. His cabinet became one of those that played a leading role in enhancing the image and practice of private detective work in a context of exigency for legitimacy.

In 1925, La Barthe created the periodical Détective, conceived as a "journal aimed at crime professionals". It was modelled on other French police-oriented publications of the time that featured advertisements, criminal information and a series of crime stories. The content of Détective revolved around criminology, police techniques and criminal law. The historian Dominique Kalifa wrote that "the tone was very professional" in Détective. It was presented by La Barthe as the "organ of the technical Institute of criminology for the study of criminal psychology and means of social defence", under the direction of Paul Watrin.

=== Project ===
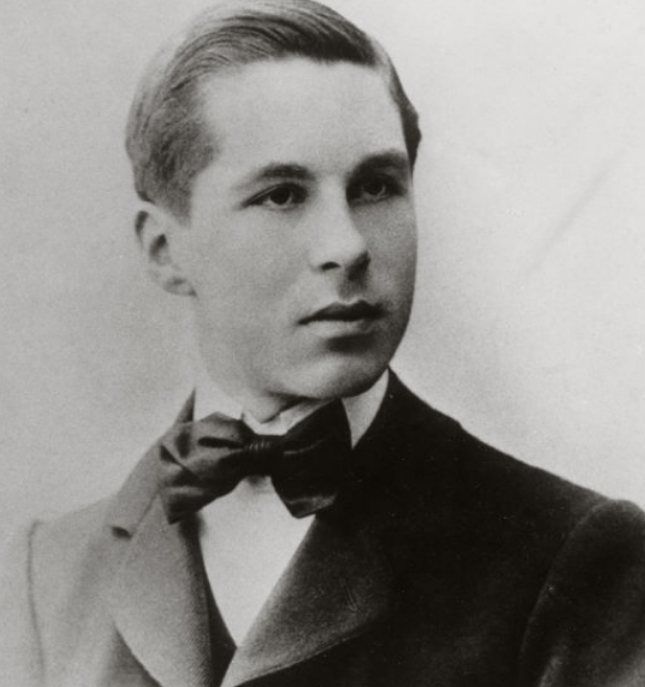
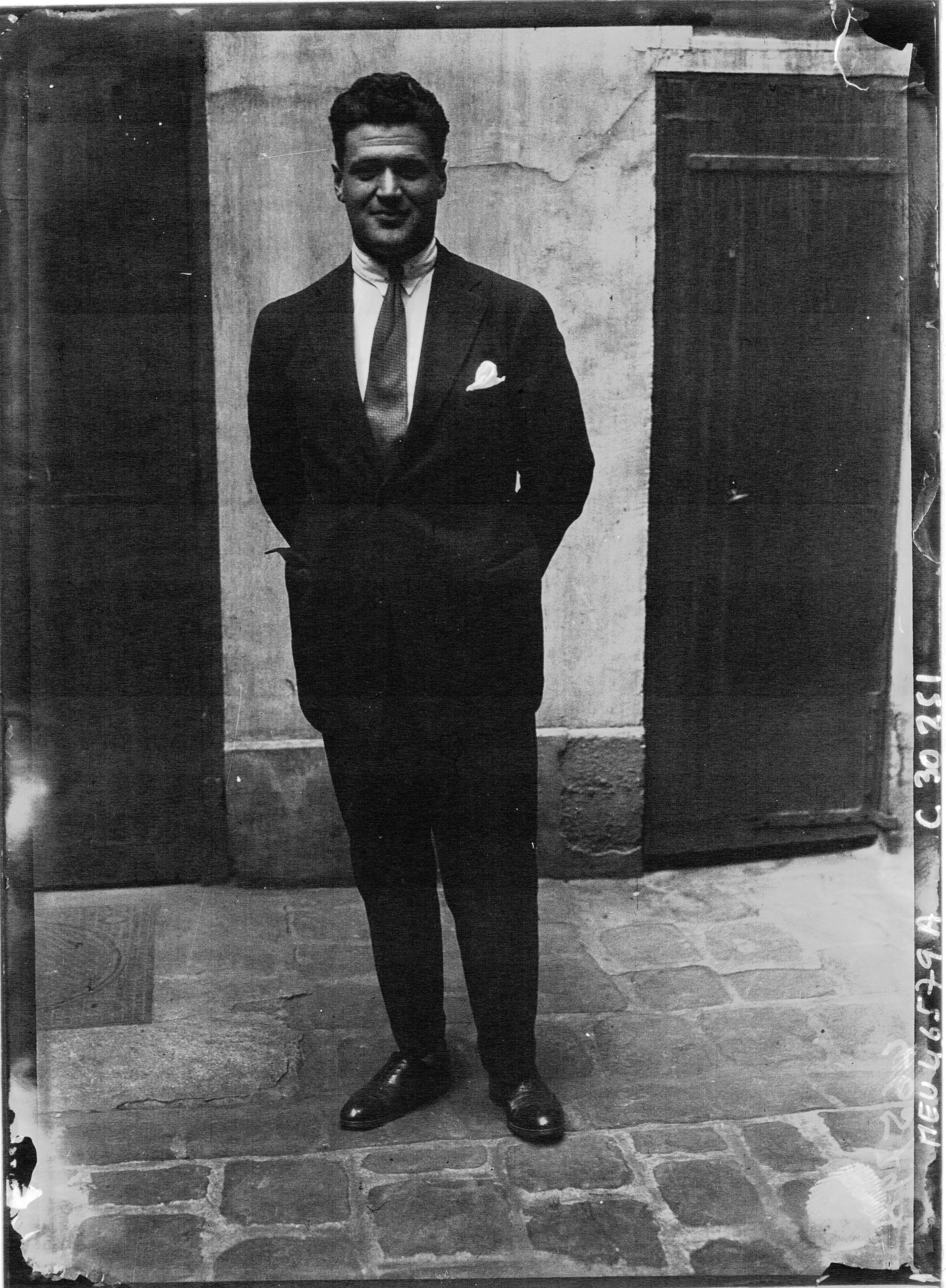
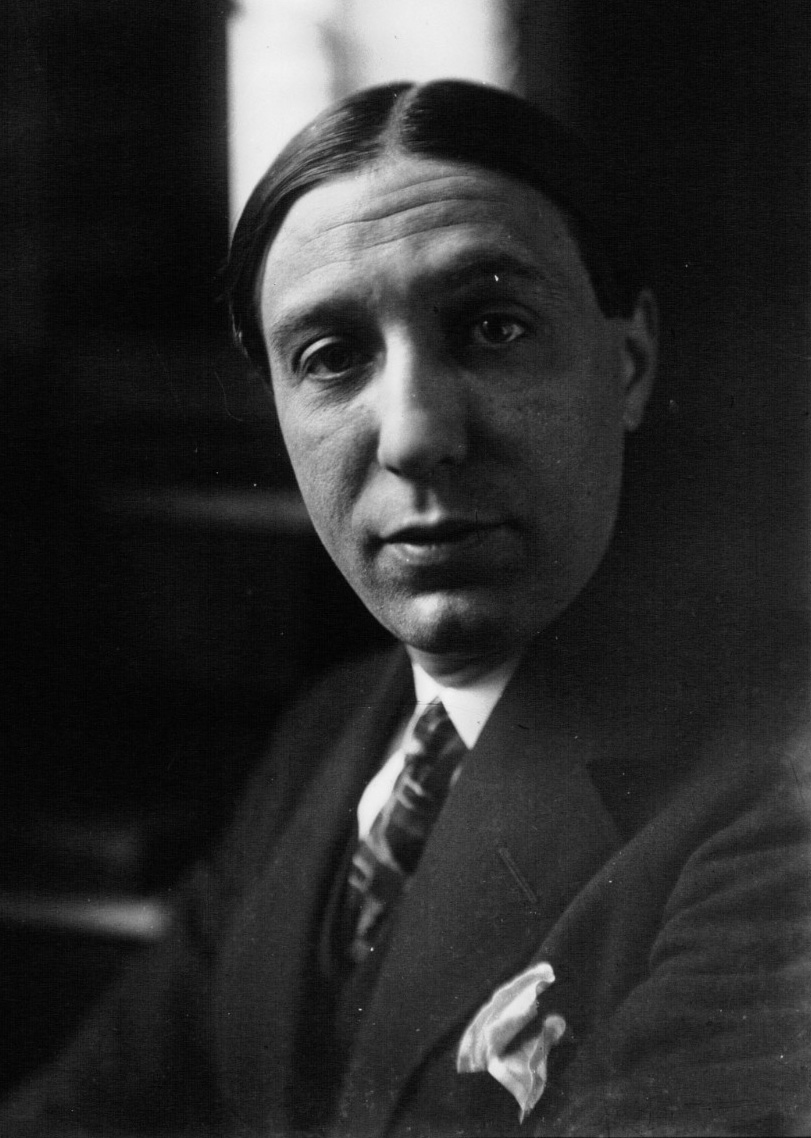
From left: Gaston Gallimard in 1900, Joseph Kessel in 1927, and Maurice Garçon in 1929

From 1926 onwards, André Gide created a new column about true crime stories in La Nouvelle Revue Française (NRF; lit. 'The New French Review').

Gaston Gallimard sought to ensure that demanding literature would continue to have funding while consolidating his publishing house's established foundations. Thus, based on Gide's work, Gallimard had the idea of launching a high-circulation periodical specialising in true crime. In 1927, La Barthe approached the novelist Joseph Kessel to explain that he wished to sell his publication, as it was costing him too much for a print run of only around a hundred copies. The project for a publication intended to show "the reverse side of the social decor" took root in the minds of Joseph and his brother Georges. Together with Joseph, Georges convinced his boss, who was Gallimard, to acquire this publication.

Amélie Chabrier, a maître de conférences in French literature and an author, later stated that the "stroke of genius" was "in reality" attributable to Gallimard, even though Joseph had claimed the original idea. This took place against the backdrop of the success of true crime magazines—originally launched in the United States in 1924 with True Detective Mysteries—that began circulating in Canada and Mexico.

La Barthe met Gallimard in June 1928. However, Kalifa and journalist Boris Senff said that the sale occurred in May. La Barthe became a long-term partner during the early years of the new version of Détective, after leading negotiations for an equity stake in the operation. In October 1928, Gallimard launched Détective under the patronage of Joseph, Paul Bringuier, Louis Roubaud, and Maurice Garçon.

=== Conversion of Détective ===
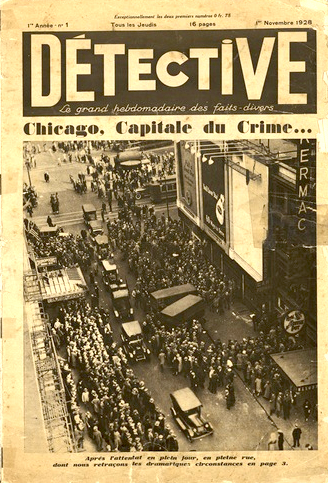
Front cover of the first issue of Détective magazine, published on 1 November 1928

Gallimard asked Georges to convert the professional publication into a magazine, and he then created a mockup with his team. After partnering with Hachette for high-volume distribution at railway stations, Gallimard entrusted Détective to the Kessel brothers. Georges was put in charge of the direction, and Joseph of the editorial side as a journalist. Gallimard said to Georges: "Do whatever you want with it." The first editor-in-chief of Gallimard's Détective was Édouard Séné. Détective, which bore the subheading "The major weekly of true crime stories", was published on 1 November 1928. According to author Hervé Mille, Détective was the first magazine published in France to use the rotogravure printing process. The first issue had 250,000 copies printed. Olivier Costemalle of Libération said it was an "immediate [s]uccess." Press historian Claire Blandin wrote: "The success was meteoric."

La Barthe continued to contribute by writing long chronicles describing his vocation as a detective until issue number 16 in February 1929. The journalistic accounts were illustrated with photographs of foreign cities like Buenos Aires or Chicago, as well as of murderers and corpses. The magazine depicted the unfolding of a case using snapshots in a photonovel style and featured double-page spreads of photomontages. Chabrier wrote that the "three essential ingredients" that would make the success of Détective were "photography, investigation, and fiction". In 1929, the circulation of Détective was 800,000 copies. The offices of Détective were located at 35 rue Madame in Paris.

A friend of Police Prefect Jean Chiappe and lawyer Henri Torrès, and familiar with the pègre, Joseph was known as a reporter, novelist and man of action; however, he played a less significant role in the magazine's history than Georges did. Joseph frequented the nightclubs of Montmartre, made friendships with cabaret owners and tough guys, and met gangsters who shared their stories, as well as cocaine dealers, Russian migrants, Cossacks and Tsiganes. The early issues included Paris, la nuit (lit. 'Paris, the night') by Joseph and illustrated by Germaine Krull, a work among the novels and nouvelles (short stories) of crime published in Détective.

The serialisation of novels in Détective ceased quickly and was replaced by what was then termed as reality subject to "romancement" (romanticisation; written like a novel). This style employed by the magazine was later described by Sophie Berthier of Télérama as a "bidonnage" (falsifying), a claim that Chabrier, however, qualified. Readers were captivated by fictionalised true crime stories and reportage whose facts stemmed from field investigations. Moreover, the team drew upon the "codes" and techniques of then-popular fiction genres, such as the romance and police novel, as well as the American gangster film. Costemalle stated that Détective engaged in sensationalism, voyeurism, and "bad taste", and made condemnatory statements, sparking unfavourable criticism from the very beginning. The magazine was managed by Georges for about eighteen months.

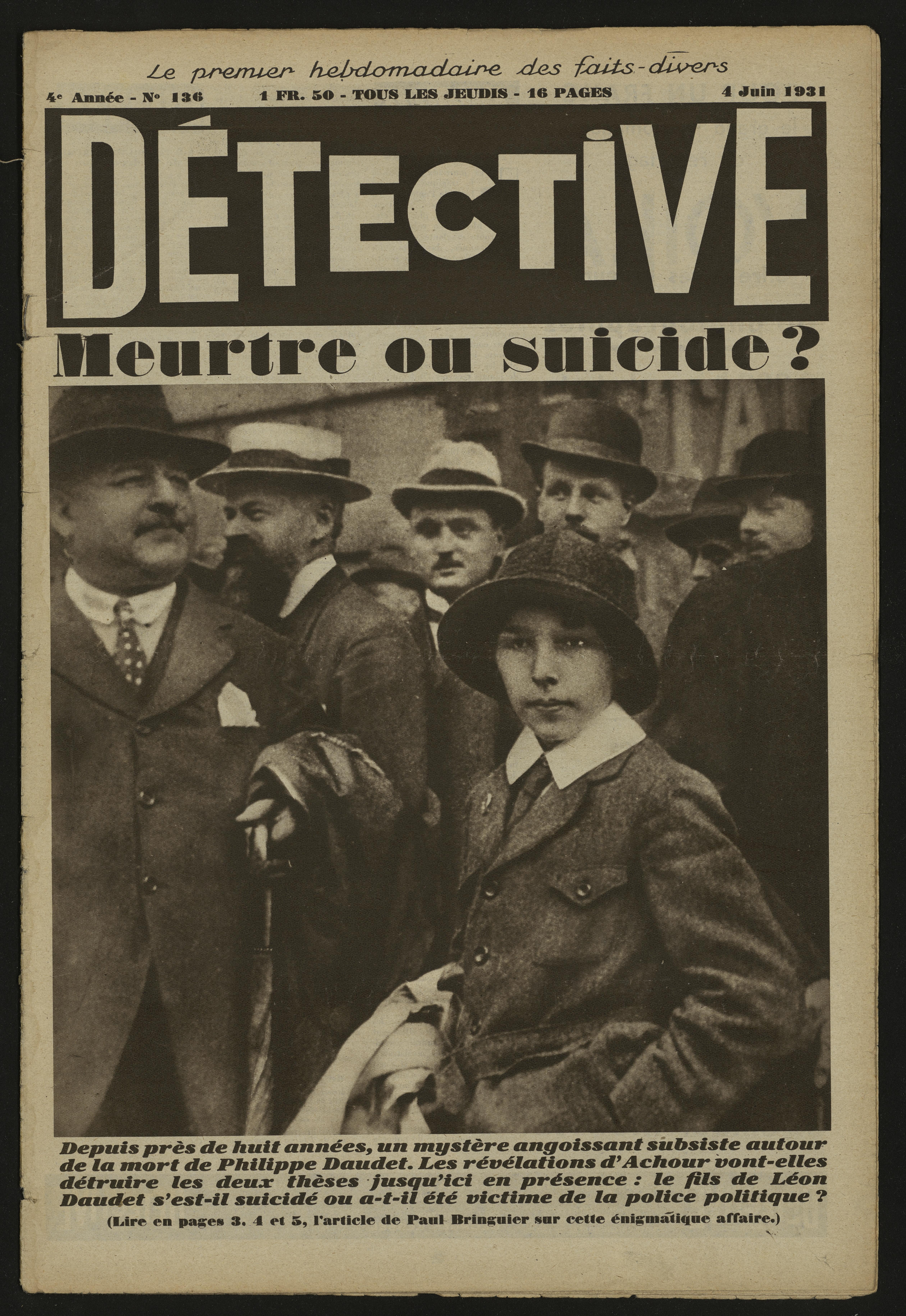
Léon (left) and Philippe Daudet (right) on the cover of the 4 June 1931 issue, with the headline "Murder or suicide?"

Joseph's contribution to Détective lasted until 1931. He was replaced by Marius Larique, who went on to assemble a team of provincial and foreign correspondents as well as staff writers; this group included some of the early contributors: Bringuier, Francis Carco, Henri Danjou, Marcel Montarron and Pierre Mac Orlan. Others also wrote for the magazine: Jean Cocteau, Georges Simenon, Paul Morand, Léon-Paul Fargue, Marcel Achard, Philippe Hériat, Gide and François Mauriac. Marcel Carrière, Walter Gillett and Jean-Gabriel Séruzier formed the photography department.

Bringuier, Danjou, and Larique frequented underworld circles and travelled abroad, sharing what they saw with readers, with social issues or crimes taking the form of a "mystery to be solved", echoing the style of a novel. The magazine featured "rigorous" investigations about prostitution and drug networks that were "well-substantiated and free of judgment"—albeit blended with scabrous subjects, all illustrated by "shocking photos". La Barthe's contributions to Détective became less frequent between 1931 and 1932.

Séné served as editor-in-chief until his death in 1932. Most of the time, an editor and a photographer were assigned to a crime scene, and the journalists—with their image as adventurers or "bad boys"—mimicked the police, creating the impression that they could solve the case before the officers did. Kidnappings and rapes were the "raw material" for reporters. The magazine covered criminal cases that occurred in the United States, such as the kidnapping of the Lindbergh baby in 1932. In the periodical Le Surréalisme au service de la révolution (lit. 'The surrealism in the Service of the Revolution'), [Louis] Aragon criticised the magazine for its "exaltation of the cop" and "its Americanism".

In 1933, the subheading changed to "The leading weekly for true crime stories". Détective offered sensationalistic headlines on major criminal cases as well as in-depth reports, such as those concerning the Papin sisters and Violette Nozière. Recurring themes concerning unsafe areas and prostitution were accompanied by testimonies and a moralising rhetoric that aligned with the reactionary stance. While short stories and novels were published from the very beginning, the relationship with factual truth often became nebulous, as works of fiction transformed into authentic reports. Détective was increasingly viewed as of poor quality, characterised by a sensationalism that was sometimes "sordid".

From 1928 to 1933, Détective enjoyed a period of prosperity. The only regular contributors to Détective were Carco and Mac Orlan, who were responsible for major investigations. The magazine featured "journalistic battles" for causes such as the defence of [Roger] Salengro, the protection of mistreated minors, and the abolition of the bagne and the guillotine.

=== Decline and wartime ===
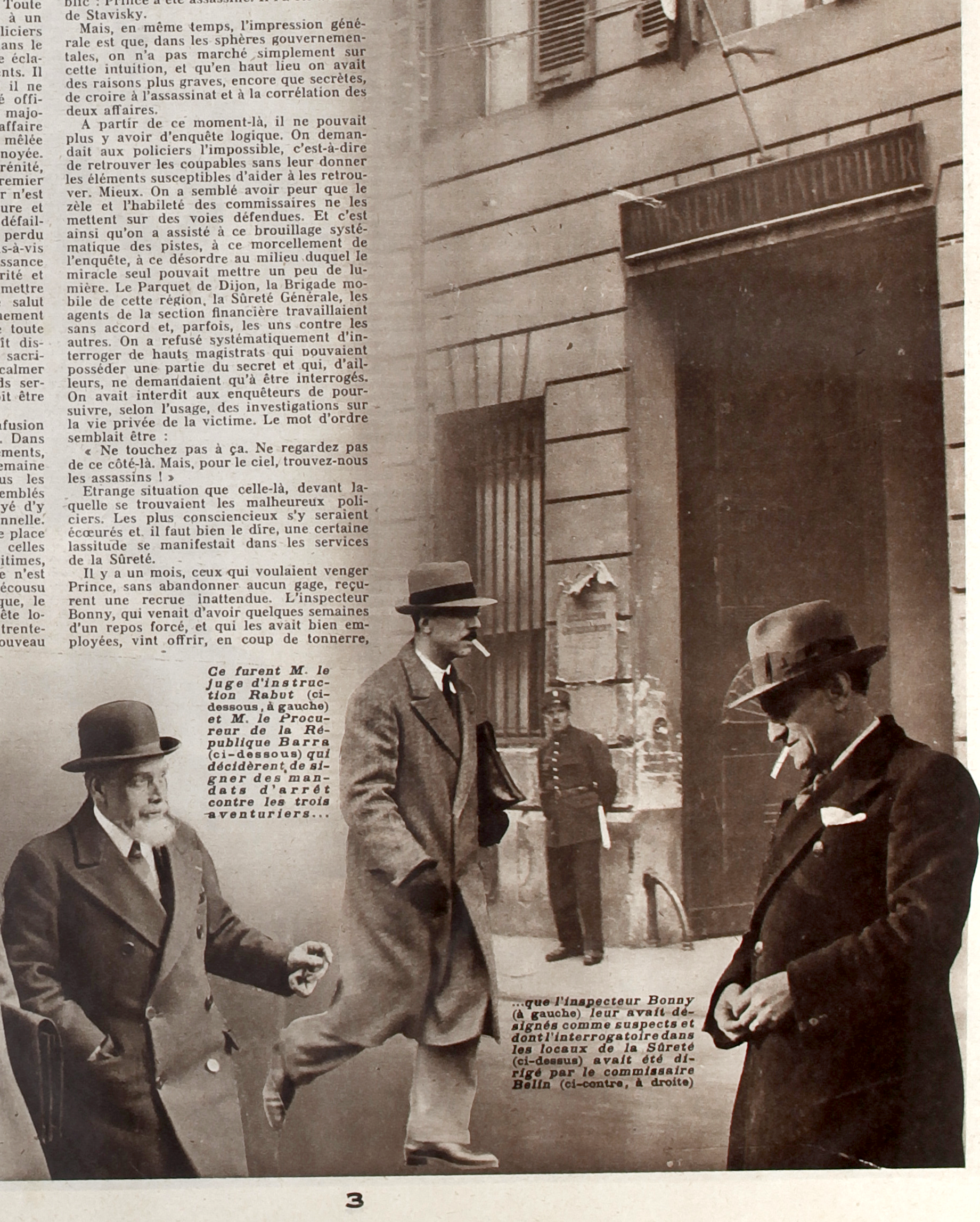
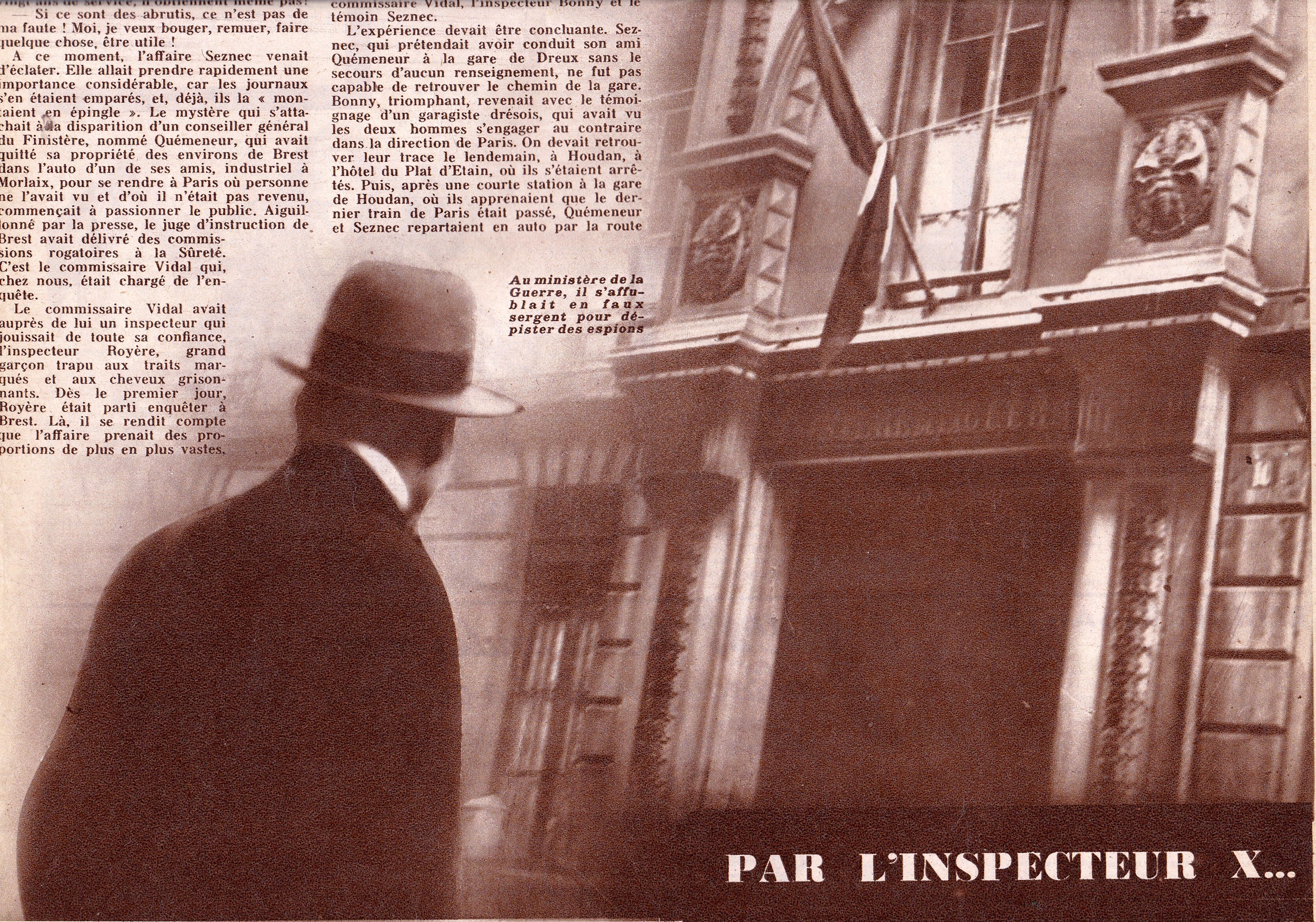
Photomontages in Détective. Left: the 5 April 1934 issue regarding the Stavisky affair. Right: the 13 December 1934 issue showing Pierre Bonny

As a consequence of the 6 February 1934 crisis, the French public lost interest in sensational crime stories and turned its attention to politics. This prompted the magazine's staff to shift their focus towards major political cases, such as the Stavisky affair, which was featured in one of Détective's special edition. This topic—or the "major social investigations" that became a recurring feature from 1936 onwards—brought national and everyday issues to the forefront of the magazine. However, as circulation figures fell, Gallimard was driven to cut costs by lowering salaries, reducing reporting expenses, and letting editors and employees go. Meanwhile, the weekly resumed crime short stories and serialised novels.

While Détective's reporters were sent out to cover the start of the Spanish Civil War in 1936, the rise of Nazism in Germany was causing worries to the team. From 1936 onwards, the magazine's success declined. Détective featured headlines such as "The hands of killer Weidmann", "Crime without a body", or "The Lyon dismemberer". Social investigations appeared alongside xenophobic and homophobic "ideas". This attitude intensified in the late 1930s, with certain writers also adopting a hard line towards foreigners and offenders. These positions did not reflect the magazine's editorial line, as it was made up of people with mixed political views, noted Chabrier. Everything became a pretext for publishing sexualised content and images of undressed women.

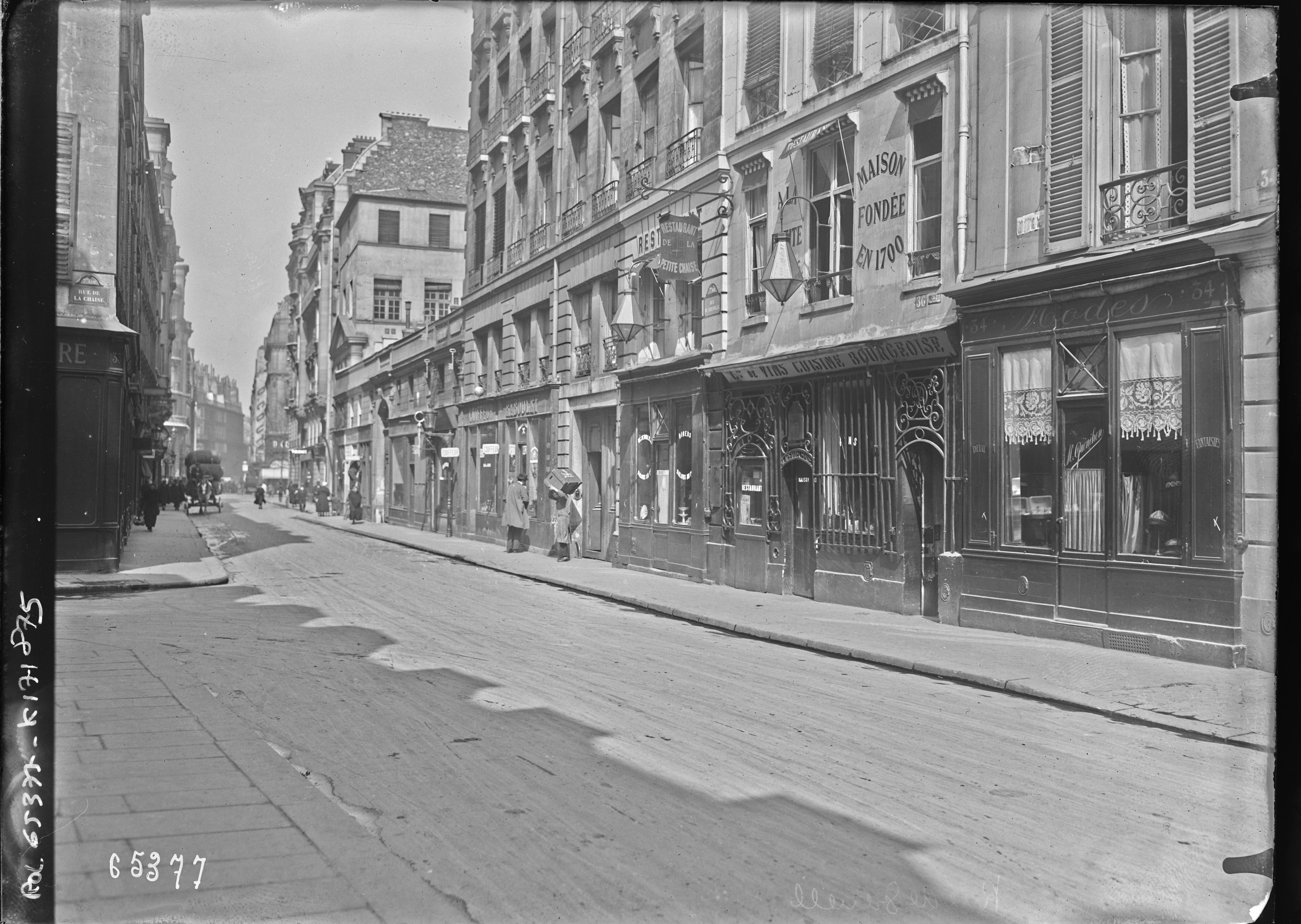
The offices on rue de Grenelle in Paris came under Nazi control during the war. Gallimard lost three-quarters of the archives

Despite attempts to reshape it around themes such as anti-Germanism, occultism, and spiritualism around 1939, the magazine was subjected to "clear cuts" by Gallimard. The circulation of Détective fell to around 250,000 copies in 1939. As tensions with Germany mounted, Détective featured topics about the Gestapo, "war ruses", and spies, while the magazine's front cover gradually adopted a dark tone and a "sinister air". In September 1939, part of the editorial staff was mobilised for the Second World War. Then, the war effort became the main topic of the articles, while many journalists "denounc[ed] the danger of immigration", which was part of the atmosphere of the time.

The magazine's team discovered it was too late when they wanted to relocate the offices to the provinces in May 1940. The Détective offices were shared with Voilà, another Gallimard weekly. On 30 May 1940, Détective was suspended, as the wartime economy and a sudden loss of public interest in this type of content brought the magazine to a halt. Its main rival, Police Magazine, stopped permanently. In July 1940, the magazine's offices on rue de Grenelle were searched by German officers, who completely barred access to them. They were looking for Jewish employees and emptied out the offices.

During its first twelve years, Détective had been banned from putting up advertising posters in certain French cities, in Paris and in Belgium. Berthier wrote that Détective "was the first [French] weekly dedicated to true crime stories and enjoyed success until the war; often dismissed as a 'rag', it sparked criticism for its immorality and lack of reliability".

Gallimard returned to the offices when the Liberation of France came and discovered that three-quarters of the magazine's archives had disappeared.

=== Post-war and Qui? Détective ===
In 1946, the magazine reappeared under the name Qui? Détective (lit. 'Who? Detective'). Gallimard sold the magazine for five million francs. It was sold to the publisher Éditions Nuit et Jour (lit. 'Night and Day Edition'), part of the Beyler group. The drawer Angelo Di Marco was hired; his first drawings were published in the magazine in 1948. Gallimard later told L'Express: "The only moment I was financially comfortable, at that time, was when I was publishing Détective ... That was my best commercial success."

=== Original name ===
Blandin stated that Di Marco was "indissociable from the history of the post-war Détective". From 1958 onwards, it was sold under its original name, Détective. In 1959, the police apprehended the criminal Guy Trébert after the magazine published a sketch by Di Marco based on several eyewitness accounts.

Blandin wrote that the 1970s would see the "sensationalist drift" of the magazine. In 1977, the magazine's circulation was 380,711 copies, which represented a 22.2 percent increase over one year. Costemalle said that "the texts remained rather prudish", which contrasted with sensationalist headlines such as: "He beheads the woman he wanted to marry", "She hands her daughter over to her sadistic lover" or "A shard of green paint unmasked the diabolical lovers". Costemalle further said that it was illustrated by Di Marco's "hyper-realistic" drawings of "understated and unsettling eroticism".

=== Banning order ===
In November 1978, a tense discussion regarding Détective took place at the National Assembly. A wave of protest also erupted in Paris, driven by a collective of women horrified by the magazine's grotesque and sensationalist headlines, which were visible to children. The first contestation came in the form of the 32,000 posters plastered up in the streets every week by the magazine's team, bearing headlines such as: "The magician had group sex with the mother and daughter", "He organises his wife's rape", "He drugs his wife and sells her naked at auctions!", "She hands her sister over to her pimp lover!" or "Raped by her mother's lover!". Bertrand Le Gendre of Le Monde wrote that the 32 pages of Détective, along with its sepia-toned photos and massive headlines, were not all that different from other publications of the same type; however, it stood out for "the climate of sexual violence it cultivated around sensationalised crime stories blown up out of proportion". The magazine was targeted by the Commission de surveillance et de contrôle des publications destinées à l'enfance et à l'adolescence (lit. 'Commission for the Surveillance and Control of Publications Intended for Children and Adolescence')—established under a 1949 law—because its reports increasingly focused on sordid crimes involving minor offenders.

On 2 December 1978, the Minister of the Interior announced that he had invoked Article 14 of the Act of 16 July 1949, thereby issuing an order imposing two bans on the magazine, despite Beyler's stubborn refusal to give up the advertising posters. The magazine was issued a "ban on sales to minors and on advertising by display means". In the name of freedom of expression, the newspaper Libération came to the Détective's defence, though they were unable to prevent its ban. That same month, Le Gendre considered Détective to be "practically condemned to death".

=== Qui? Police ===
The magazine was subject to "a ban for pornographic orientation" in 1979, Blandin noted. The magazine was published under the name Qui? Police starting in 1979. As a strategy aimed to win back a dwindling readership, the press drawings in Qui? Police replaced the provocative photographs that had previously made the magazine's headlines.

=== Le Nouveau Détective ===
In 1982, it was renamed Le Nouveau Détective (lit. 'The New Detective'). Le Nouveau Détective "returns to the fundamentals of investigative journalism to regain reader trust," wrote Blandin, and adopted a new graphic charter with a distinct visual identity defined by the colours yellow, red, white and black. The 1980s marked a revival for the magazine; the "sulfurous photographs" that had previously led to legal problems were replaced Di Marco's drawings.

On 25 October 1989, journalist Jean-Paul Pradier of Le Nouveau Détective met with Judge Maurice Simon in the context surrounding the murder of Grégory Villemin. Shortly after that, the magazine published an "exclusive interview" in which the judge in charge of the "Grégory case" allegedly said that Bernard Laroche "might have kidnapped" the child. He concluded that several people were the child's killers and exonerated the mother, Christine Villemin. Simon also supposedly said that Grégory's grandparents, Albert and Monique Villemin, were the only ones who knew details about his own family, which was receiving threats at the time. The Ministry of Justice was informed the very day it was published in the magazine. Simon and Pradier contradicted each other regarding the reason for their meeting; the authenticity of this interview sparked a polemic.

On 15 January 1990, Le Nouveau Détective and Judge Simon were sued before the Paris judicial court by Maître Pompt, who sought a court order requiring them to jointly pay 150,000 francs to Murielle Bolle and 300,000 francs to Marie-Ange Laroche for "reparation of the prejudice".

A former political interviewer for Playboy France, Catherine Nemo became an editorial board secretary, then a copy editor, and editor-in-chief. Having inherited the magazine from his father, Jean-Noël Beyler sold it in 1995 to Nemo, who became the head of Le Nouveau Détective. In 1995, the circulation was 226,000 copies.

The magazine sales rose in 2000, with a circulation of 254,000 copies. In 2001, Nemo sought to give Le Nouveau Détective a new image and credibility, describing it as a "magazine of investigations" and rejecting any comparison with publications like France Dimanche and Ici Paris, even though all three have been categorised as "sensation" weeklies by Diffusion Contrôle. The front page of 31 January 2001 demonstrated continuity with the magazine's tradition, featuring the headline "Murdered with her baby in her arms", while the cover design had changed to become less "garish" under Nemo's influence.

In February 2001, Nemo owned 50% of Éditions Nuit et Jour, the publisher of Le Nouveau Détective. In 2003, Le Nouveau Détective passed into the hands of the German media group Hubert Burda Media Holding, whose French subsidiaries would later include Éditions Nuit et Jour and Hubert Burda Media under the Burda Bleu entity.

As part of the "Grégory case", the septuagenarians Marcel and Jacqueline Jacob were charged with "kidnapping and false imprisonment followed by death", then incarcerated on 16 June 2017, and subsequently released under judicial supervision on 20 June. On 21 June, Le Nouveau Détective published photos of the couple on its front page, with the headline "The Grégory case: it was them", and "Everything seems to be in place to put a name to the culprits" as the article's subheading. In December 2017, the Épinal court ruled that Le Nouveau Détective had violated Jacob's presumption of innocence and ordered the magazine to pay him €4,000 in damages, whereas his lawyer had asked for €50,000. In addition, Le Nouveau Détective's staff were required to publish the court ruling on the magazine's front cover and website.

The narrative style of Le Nouveau Détective does not align with that of general-interest journalism, but rather with that of the police novel. Hubert Prolongeau of Marianne disparaged Le Nouveau Détective, comparing it with the era when it was called Détective, criticising its "lurid covers" and for "overselling sordid information". Julie Rigoulet is the editor-in-chief of the weekly magazine Le Nouveau Détective. To cover in real time the latest updates on the disappearance of 15-year-old Lina in the Bas-Rhin, the magazine used news flashes on its X account in October 2023, as a way of turning it into a serial. Marianne's Marion Rivet stated that the style "interrogates the profession's deontological principles". Rigoulet wanted Le Nouveau Détective to remain visible amidst the dominance of rolling news channels. The magazine is based in Montrouge, south of Paris.
