= Gang des Tractions Avant =

The Gang des Tractions Avant was a criminal gang in the Pigalle quarter of Paris, made up of surviving members of the Carlingue militia, lapsed police officers and criminals from the French Resistance. Most of them had moved from collaboration with the German occupiers to the Resistance, and then moved into organised crime—though even if their milieu changed, their behaviour and methods remained the same. The gang was named after its preferred vehicle, the Citroën 11CV "Traction".

Its methods were largely derived from those of the Bonnot Gang and were mostly continued by a number of other gangs, notably the gang des postiches. The Gang des Tractions Avant gave rise to the writings of Alphonse Boudard and Roger Borniche, the movies of Jean-Luc Godard and Jacques Deray, a TV series by Josée Dayan, and a board game by Serge Laget and Alain Munoz.

== Members ==
Its most famous members were

- Pierre Loutrel (1916-1946), known as "Pierrot le Fou", France's first "public enemy number one"
- Émile Buisson, or "Mimile" (1902-1956 guillotined), Loutrel's lieutenant, and his successor as "public enemy number one". He was finally arrested by Roger Borniche
- René la Canne, or René Girier (1919-2000) nicknamed "the king of évasion"
- Abel Danos known as "le Mammouth" (the Mammoth)
- Georges Boucheseiche, later became embroiled in the Ben Barka affair
- François Marcantoni (1920-2010) known as "Monsieur François", suspected in The Markovic affair
- Jo Attia, also became embroiled in that affair

== Bibliography ==
- Charles Bacelon, Max Clos, etc. Histoire du banditisme et des grandes affaires criminelles, Genève : éditions Famot, 1974. OCLC 77615747
