= Joseph Joanovici =

French businessman

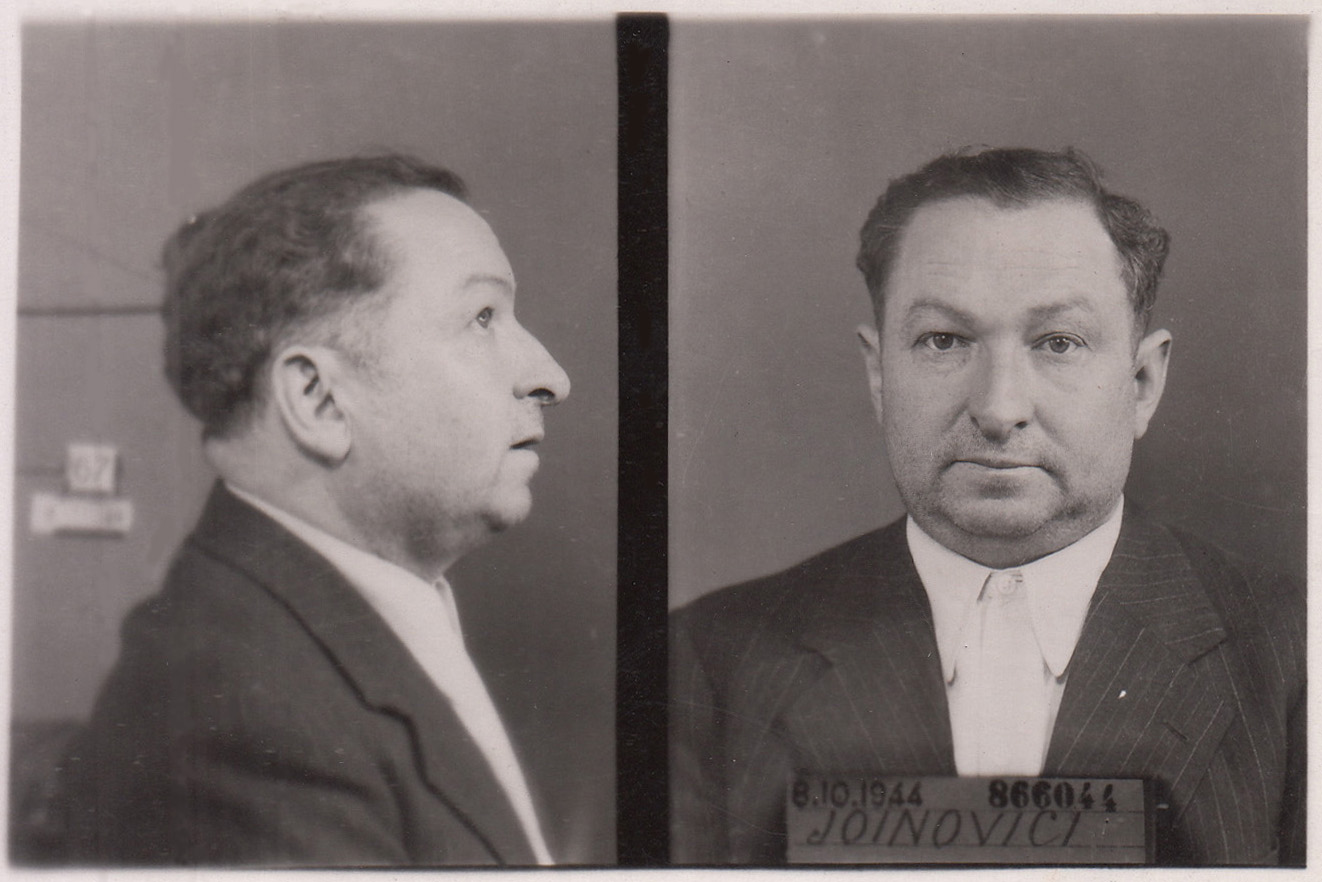
- mugshot of Joseph Joanovici (October 1944)
- Born: 20 February 1905; Chișinău, Russian Empire
- Died: 7 February 1965 (aged 59); Clichy, France
- Occupation: Iron supplier
- Known for: Supplied iron to Nazi Germany and funded the French Resistance

Joseph Joanovici (also Ioinovici or Joinovici, 1905 –1965) was a Russian-born Romanian and French resident scrap metal merchant who supplied Nazi Germany and funded the French Resistance with the proceeds during the German occupation of France in World War II.

He made a fortune during the four years of the occupation, and spent it entertaining high-ranking officials. He sold the Germans metal, bribed Nazis officers, financed the Resistance, and may also have given information to Soviet intelligence.

== Early life ==
Joseph Joanovici was born on 20 February 1905 in Chișinău, then part of the Russian Empire, now the capital of Moldova. His parents were killed in the 1905 Chișinău pogrom. He married a fellow orphan named Eva and in 1925 emigrated to France, settling in a suburb of Paris.

He got his start in scrap metal at a low-level job in a business owned by his wife’s uncle. Although he was illiterate, and would remain so until late in life, Joanovici was adept at running a business and pushed the uncle out and took over with the help of his brother, Marcel. He began to supply the Nazi regime with metal, which made him a millionaire.

According to various sources, he also developed close ties with the French mafia.

Despite his illiteracy, through hard work and affability, Joanovici became Monsieur Joseph, a well-known scrap metal merchant in the Paris suburb of Clichy.

He had an appearance of artlessness that one commentator characterized as irresistible to those who crossed his path: "the kind of guy who could strike up a conversation with absolutely anyone at the seediest bar..'"

== Metal supplier to Germans ==
When World War II broke out, Joanovici understood that as a Jew he would need protection and that the Germans would need sources for metal. He began delivering it to the buying agency of the Abwehr at the Hotel Lutetia. Joanovici collaborated with Nazi Germany, while also supporting the Resistance. In 1941 he was arrested by the German authorities for selling defective materials to the Nazi-owned WIFO company. At his post-war trial, he characterized this and other transactions as acts of wartime sabotage against the Germans. He spent several months in captivity before he managed to bribe his way to his release.

Around this time he also became associated with Henri Lafont, a leader of the Carlingue, the Bonny-Lafont Paris black market gang run from 93 rue Lauriston. This greatly increased his social standing in occupied Paris, and Lafont protected him from deportation.

Starting in 1942, Joanovici put himself under the protection of Lafont, who declared after his arrest: "I got him several times out of the Germans' hands, as well as those of the French. Everyone knew I was protecting him. At dinner once, Lafont needled him: "After all, Joseph, you're nothing but a dirty yid!" Joanovici raised his flute of champagne and asked: "How much to not be one anymore, Hauptsturmführer?

The DST said it had had in its possession a German file registering him as an agent of the Gestapo. (Note: (Bernert, p. 130)) He was sometimes called an "honorary Aryan". When Henri Lafont co-founded the Brigade nord-africaine the Gestapo, despite its approval, offered little material support, so Joanovici provided it, including the uniforms. This unit later committed several massacres in Dordogne, and one of its officers, the former team captain of the national football team, was charged with war crimes.

Certainly Joanovici moved in Nazi social circles, took German officers drinking, and made friends through sheer affability and a talent for losing at cards.

== Resistance figure ==
Joanovici also quite early on became involved with the Resistance. Joanovici used his wealth and the privileges he enjoyed as an associate of the Carlingue to support the Resistance in several ways, bribing German officials into releasing a number of potential deportation victims and using his papers of safe-passage to transport weapons to Resistance members in Paris. In addition, credible claims have been made that he was a principal financier of the insurrection that resulted in the Liberation of Paris.

In July 1941 his name already appeared in the police files of the Turma-Vengeance police Resistance network. When that crumbled and Inspector Albert Dhalenne of Clichy and Brigadier Émile Gaget faced a firing squad at Mont Valérien in January and February 1942, it came to light that Joanovici had been financing an escape line of their network that got deserters and escaped prisoners to England via his nephew Ivrail (or Avraili), who ran the La Rochelle subsidiary of his business. Joanovici had also employed Gaget at his Saint-Pierre location, after he lost his police badge for abandoning his post. Avraili was sentenced by a German court to five years in prison. As the Liberation of France drew closer, Joanovici financed other Resistance networks such as Honneur de la police., as well as some communist groups. In June 1944, he had Françoise Giroud freed from Fresnes prison. He also denounced the members of the French Gestapo known to him, triggering the arrest of Pierre Bonny and Henri Lafont on 31 August 1944 at a farm in Bazoches-sur-le-Betz (Loiret).

Joanovici was arrested and interrogated several times about his business dealings with the Nazis, then always released. Roger Wybot, then the director of the DST, said he was protected by the préfecture de police (Note: (Bernert, p. 131)) On 5 March 1947 the DST tried to detain him at the Prefecture itself, inside accomplices helped him escape investigators (Note: (Bernert, p. 133)) and leave the country. A purge followed that reached all the way to prefect Charles Luizet, who retired for health reasons.

Joanovici avoided arrest after the war, and testified against other collaborators, most notably Pierre Bonny and Henri Lafont, leaders of the Carlingue. For years, he had been financing a Resistance network inside the Paris Police Prefecture, named Honneur de la Police, and by the time the war was over, he was on such intimate terms with the police that he had his own office at the Prefecture and was awarded the Resistance Medal.

Other institutions were less fond of his wartime activities, with Roger Wybot, the head of French counter-intelligence, in particular seeking his arrest. Aided by employees of the Prefecture, he managed to avoid arrest by fleeing to the American-occupied zone of Germany.

== Arrest and imprisonment ==
Wybot accused the Paris Police Prefecture of protecting him and delaying his arrest. The ensuing scandal led to the resignation of Charles Luizet, the police prefect.

Joseph Joanovici returned to France to surrender to the police: he set up a fake rendezvous in Phalsbourg on 26 November 1947, but instead went directly to the Préfecture de police, to avoid being arrested by the DST. He was jailed on 28 November at La Santé prison (Note: (Bernert, pp. 173–174)) and charged with economic collaboration in July 1949, was tried without excessive enthusiasm and with contradictory findings: while he collaborated, he also armed the Resistance with the proceeds. "I didn't sell out to the Germans, since I was the one paying them!" he said, and also "What are is one supposed to do against the Germans? What I did was make a fortune." Joanovici was sentenced to five years in prison, but was freed in 1952. France tried to expel him, since he had presented himself variously as Soviet or Romanian, (Note: (Bernert, p. 175)) but no country would accept him. Sentenced to house arrest in Mende, he tried to rebuild his business. Joanovici was the first to dream up how to swindle VAT, which was still in its infancy. All that was needed was to ask the state to export old iron salvaged in France to other countries, which would mean the tax was reimbursed. In fact, the iron was not exported but offloaded for sale in France. This re-routing resulted in an embezzlement of 800 million francs.

Realizing that the tax authorities were after him, he went on the run in October 1957, arriving in Haifa via Geneva and Casablanca. Because of his past as a Nazi collaborator, he was expelled from Israel, becoming, with Robert Soblen and Meyer Lansky the first of the three Jews to whom Israel refused to apply the Law of return, giving Israeli citizenship to all Jews within its borders.

During his 1949 trial, at least 27 individuals testified that they were released from German captivity due to Joanovici's intervention. These testimonies, along with his support for the Honneur de la Police, his role in the capture of Bonny and Lafont, and his Resistance Medal, contributed to his exoneration on charges of intelligence with the enemy. He was, however, found guilty of economic collaboration, for which he was sentenced to five years in prison, as well as confiscation of his property. Since the annexation of his native Bessarabia by Romania during the war made his nationality uncertain, he avoided deportation. Furthermore, his poor health rendered him no longer suitable for a prison environment, so the decision was made to keep him under house arrest in a hotel room in the southern town of Mende. Using the telephone in his hotel room, he was able to rebuild his fortune in the scrap-metal trade and became a very visible philanthropist who enjoyed immense popularity in Mende.

In January 1957, he fled France and sought refuge in Israel using a fake passport. After the Israeli authorities became aware of his fake documentation and the false pretenses under which he entered the country, his permit of residence was not renewed, and he was forced to return to France in late 1958. There he was once again arrested and subjected to a trial, which resulted in his acquittal of most of the charges and finally being sentenced to one year in prison.

He was jailed in 1958 at the Baumettes Prison. Weakened by a long hunger strike, and suffering from arteriosclerosis, he was freed in May 1962 on humanitarian grounds due to his health, and lived quietly thereafter at his modest two-room apartment on avenue Anatole-France in Clichy, cared for by his former secretary and mistress Lucie Schmidt, nicknamed "Lucie-Fer", Iron Lucy. Ruined, he died impoverished on 7 February 1965.

== Legacy ==
Joanovici's dealings with both the occupying German forces and the French Resistance during the war led to a mixed legacy both during his lifetime and after his death. Both historical and fictional depictions of Joanovici vary immensely, creating a complicated modern image which philosopher Jeffrey Mehlman described as "an almost unfathomable bundle of contradictions".

While sometimes described as a shady, corrupt and unscrupulous businessman who did not shy away from collaborating with the Nazis, commentators have also noted his efforts as a means to survive under the anti-semitic regime. According to the Times of Israel,

"the most amazing aspect of Joainovici’s story is that he managed to survive the war when many other French Jewish profiteers, such as the infamous Michel (Mandel) Szkolnikoff, met a violent end. Joanovici emerged from the war as a hero to some and a traitor to others — but by all counts, very much alive".

== Films and literature ==
In 1998 the French writer Alphonse Boudard published the novel L'Étrange Monsieur Joseph based on Joseph's life. In 2001 it was adapted as a TV film of the same name, directed by Josée Dayan from a script by Éric-Emmanuel Schmitt, with Roger Hanin as Joseph Joanovici. This adaptation was criticised for what was perceived as an over-sympathetic portrayal of Joanovici.

Between 2007 and 2012 a six-volume graphic novel by Fabien Nury and Sylvain Vallée titled “Il était une fois en France” was published, dealing with his exploits during the war. An omnibus edition was released in 2015. An English translation was released in 2019 under the title "Once Upon a Time in France".

=== Films ===
- 2004: 93, rue Lauriston television film produced by Denys Granier-Deferre, with Hervé Briaux as Joseph Joanovici.
- 2001: fr:L'Étrange Monsieur Joseph, television film produced by Josée Dayan from a screenplay by Éric-Emmanuel Schmitt adapting Alphonse Boudard's book, with Roger Hanin in the role of Joseph Joanovici. This adaptation was criticized for a portrayal of the Joseph Joanovici character some considered too flattering.
- 1996: Un héros très discret, film produced by Jacques Audiard, based on the novel by Jean-François Deniau. The character of Monsieur Jo, played by François Berléand, was inspired by Joseph Joanovici (foreign Jewish origin, double agent, controversial after the Libération...).

== See also ==
- Useful Jew
- Carlingue

== Sources ==
Auda, Grégory (2013). Les belles années du "milieu", 1940-1944: le grand banditisme dans la machine répressive allemande en France [The Golden Years of the "Milieu", 1940-1944: Major Crime in the German Repressive Machine in France] (in French) (2 ed.). Paris: Éditions Michalon. p. 253. ISBN 978-2-84186-678-6.

== Graphic novels ==
- Il était une fois en France (Once Upon A Time in France), by Fabien Nury and Sylvain Vallée
  - Volume 1: L'Empire de Monsieur Joseph (The Empire of Mr Joseph), Glénat 2007.
  - Volume 2: Le Vol noir des corbeaux (The Black Flight of the Crows), Glénat 2008.
  - Volume 3: Honneur et Police (Honour and Police), Glénat 2009.
  - Volume 4: Aux armes, citoyens ! (To Arms, Citizens!), Glénat 2010.
  - Volume 5: Le Petit Juge de Melun (The Little Judge of Melun), Glénat 2011.
  - Volume 6: La Terre Promise (The Promised Land), Glénat 2012.
