= Pierre Loutrel =

French criminal gang member (1916–1946)

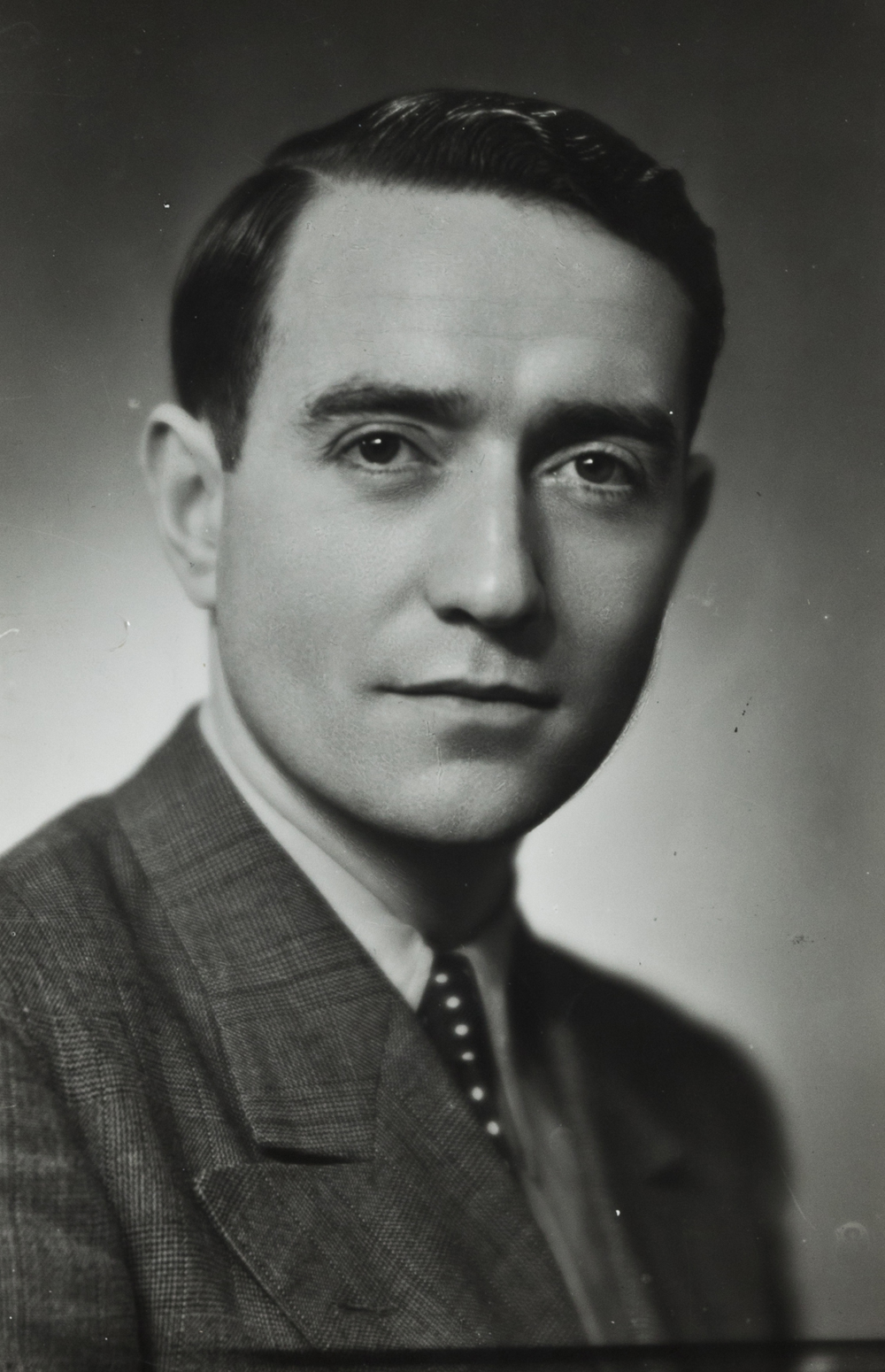

Pierre Loutrel (5 March 1916, Château-du-Loir, Sarthe – 11 November 1946), better known by his nickname of "Pierrot le fou" (Crazy Pete) was France's first "public enemy number one" and one of the leaders of the Gang des tractions.

== Biography ==
Born into a peasant family, he engaged in petty theft before profiting from the German occupation of France and using it to develop his criminal activities. From 1941 to 1944, he was a member of the Carlingue, forging a reputation as a cold-blooded murderer and carrying out more and more summary executions. He developed links with the underworld of the era, then set up his own network with Raymond Naudy, Abel Danos known as Le Mammouth, Pierre Giblaise, Fernand "Le Poulet" and Jo Attia.

However, his repeated crimes gradually brought him to the Gestapo's attention. Sensing that the tide was changing, "Pierrot le fou" thus decided to join the French Resistance, getting them into talks with him by gunning down a German officer on the terrace of a café in Toulouse. Upon the Liberation, he renewed his acquaintance with organised crime, getting involved in racketeering and pimping and gaining a reputation as an unscrupulous crime lord. With his team, he formed the famous Gang des tractions, named after their favoured vehicle, the Citroën 11, the famous tractions avant (front-drive) cars.

Hunted by Roger Borniche, the gang was partly dismantled after a raid in Champigny. It ended up separating and Pierrot le fou, considered to be dangerous and uncontrollable, once again found himself isolated and reduced to petty burglaries.

On 6 November 1946, Pierrot, who was drunk, accidentally shot himself in the bladder during a robbery of a Parisian jewellery store on avenue Kléber, after having killed its Armenian owner. He succumbed to his wounds five days later, on 11 November 1946, and his body was buried by his accomplices, being found only three years later by the police on 6 May 1949.

== Bibliography ==
- Grégory Auda, Les Belles Années du milieu, Éditions Michalon, 2002 ISBN 2-84186-164-3
- Roger Borniche, Le Gang, Fayard, 1975
- Alphonse Boudard, Les grands criminels, Edition du Club France Loisirs, 1989 (chapter 5 : "Pierrot-le-fou ou les lendemains qui flinguent").
