= Rudy de Mérode =

French collaborator (1905–????)

Rudy de Mérode, real name Frédéric Martin (28 December 1905 in Silly-sur-Nied, Moselle – ?, likely in Spain) was a French collaborator during the German occupation of France in the Second World War.

== Early life ==
Originating in Luxemburg, his family emigrated to France and were naturalised as French citizens in the 1920s. He studied engineering in Strasbourg and then in Germany, where he was recruited by the Abwehr in 1928. In 1934 he participated in the construction of the Maginot Line and passed on the plans (to which he had access) to the German intelligence services. Unmasked as a spy in 1935, he was condemned in 1936 to 10 years in jail (which he served at Clairvaux Prison) and 20 years' exile from France. During the debacle of the Battle of France, hundreds of thousands of prisoners roamed the roads of France. On 14 June, at Bar-sur-Aube, a group of prisoners was evacuated from the central prison at Clairvaux, including Rudy de Mérode and other spies, who all took advantage of the anarchy to escape and request help from the Germans.

== Black market ==
In July 1940, de Mérode returned to Paris and set himself up at German military intelligence's HQ in the Hôtel Lutetia. Attached to a supply office at 18 rue Pétrarque in Paris as a cover, he spied for the Abwehr alongside another SD agent, the Dutchman Gédéon van Houten (called the Baron d'Humières).

At first, de Mérode gathered intelligence via a team of thirty, under his orders, whom he trained himself. Most of them were fugitives from justice, and he used them to gather equipment and buildings. His team requisitioned several apartments and hôtels particuliers under the cover of being French or (more often) German policemen.

De Mérode's speciality was bank convoys, of money gathered from different sources or in the form of gold, jewels, art objects or ingots. In 1941, he set himself up at 70 boulevard Maurice-Barrès in Neuilly-sur-Seine, but van Houten and de Mérode separated in 1942 after a disagreement.

With the aid of the DSK (Devisenschutzkommando) he opened bank vaults, buying gold and silver objects from their owners at a debased price or, if they refused to cooperate, having them deported. If the property belonged to Jews, it was entirely confiscated and the Gestapo had the owner imprisoned and often deported. The "gestapo de Neuilly" team confiscated over 4 tonnes of gold, and de Mérode's network accumulated enormous sums of silver and had over 500 people arrested and deported.

=== Escape to Spain ===
At the start of 1944, the Abwehr charged de Mérode with secretly setting up an office in Spain. At first setting himself up in Saint-Jean-de-Luz, in mid 1945 he was initially to be found in San Sebastián before reaching Madrid, where he called himself "the prince de Mérode". In 1953, de Mérode, who had been sentenced to death in absentia, was still living in Spain, now 60 km north of Madrid in a brickyard. He was never brought to justice, and the date of his death remains unknown, though 1970 has been suggested.

== See also ==
- Friedrich Berger
- Henri Lafont
- Christian Masuy
