= Flic Story =

- Original movie poster, featuring Delon and Trintignant
- Directed by: Jacques Deray
- Written by: Roger Borniche (autobiography); Alphonse Boudard
- Produced by: Alain Delon
- Starring: Alain Delon; Jean-Louis Trintignant
- Cinematography: Jean-Jacques Tarbès
- Edited by: Henri Lanoë
- Music by: Claude Bolling
- Distributed by: Adel Productions; Lira Films; Mondial Televisione Film
- Release date: 1 October 1975 (France)
- Running time: 107 minutes
- Countries: France; Italy
- Language: French
- Box office: 1,970,875 admissions (France)

Flic Story is a French crime thriller released on 1 October 1975, based on the autobiography of the same name written by French police detective Roger Borniche. Both film and book portray Borniche's nine-year pursuit of French gangster and murderer Emile Buisson, who was executed on 28 February 1956. Directed by Jacques Deray, the film stars Alain Delon and Jean-Louis Trintignant as Borniche and Buisson respectively, supported by Claudine Auger and André Pousse.

== Plot ==
Flic Story follows a nine-year pursuit of Emile Buisson through France during the 1940s and 1950s, and illustrates the pursuit as a battle of intellect, focusing on a growing rapport between Buisson and the protagonist Borniche. Deray's humanizing of the characters was a trait used in his other films, and was a popular counter-cliché concept in France during the 1970s.

The film story depicts Emile Buisson, following the death of his wife and child, escaping from a psychiatric institution in 1947 and returning to Paris. Buisson, who three years later would become France's public enemy number one, begins a murderous rampage through the French capital. The opening scene shows reluctant detective (flic is the French slang equivalent of "cop" in English) Borniche, who is given the case and pursues Buisson for three years, while the latter evades capture by killing informants and anyone else he feels may give him away. Borniche, who unlike his colleagues, prides himself in a methodical approach, hunts Buisson through numerous alleyway chases, rooftop pursuits, car chases and gunfights, while putting his lover Catherine in danger.

When bureaucracy intervenes with Borniche's attempts, and politicians and the media begin speculating, he uses the assistance of another criminal, Paul Robier, to apprehend Buisson. The serial killer is finally captured after having committed over 30 murders and 100 robberies. The final sequences show Buisson telling Borniche that he would like to "take a hacksaw" to the throat of his informer, prompting a critically lauded line from Borniche that he would not get the chance.

== Cast ==
- Alain Delon as Roger Borniche
- Jean-Louis Trintignant as Émile Buisson
- Renato Salvatori as Mario Poncini
- Claudine Auger as Catherine (prototype – Martine Borniche, who in reality was not a girlfriend, but the wife of Roger Borniche)
- Maurice Biraud as The patrol of the Saint-Appoline hotel
- André Pousse as Jean-Baptiste Buisson
- Mario David as Raymond Pelletier
- Paul Crauchet as Paul Robier
- Denis Manuel as Lucien Darros
- Marco Perrin as Commissioner Viechens (his prototype is Commissioner Charles Chenevier, who was the chief of Roger Borniche)
- Henri Guybet as Hidoine
- Maurice Barrier as René Bollec
- Françoise Dorner as Suzanne Bollec
- Jacques Marin as Owner of the Inn in Saint-Rémy-lès-Chevreuse
- William Sabatier as Ange
- Adolfo Lastretti as Jeannot

== Production ==
Writers Bénédicte Kermadec and Alphonse Boudard worked with Deray on Roger Borniche's memoir in order to create the script. The film was produced by Delon, featuring cinematography by Jean-Jacques Tarbès and an original score by Claude Bolling. The film was shot and printed on 35mm negative using spherical cinematographic processes, as was common with films produced through the 1950s to the early 1990s. Production began on 3 February 1975, 18 years after Boisson's execution, and the film was shot on locations in both France and Italy.

=== Foreign releases ===
Flic Story was released from 1975 to 1977 in the United States as Cop Story, Finland as Passi ruumishuoneelle and West Germany as Der Bulle und der Killer or Flic Story - Duell in sechs Runden. The film was rated '16' in Finland, Norway and West Germany, while the latter downgraded it to '12' following the reunification.

== Reception ==
Flic Story received mainly positive reviews from critics. James Travers of Film de France praised the film for a "quality feel and sombre mood" and the lead actors for "humanity and depth". Travers also noted several similarities to the films of Jean-Pierre Melville, particularly Le Samourai. Travers names the film as one of Deray's best, although the "end result isn’t quite a masterpiece". Other internet reviews noted similarities with Melville, and complimented the film for "unsentimental verve, intelligent pacing and refreshing honesty".

Susan Hayward, author of French National Cinema, also complimented the film, saying it departed from mainstream style. She gave particular praise on the differences between Flic Story and American films of the same genre, by the way Deray focuses on the intellects rather than the brawn of the two leading characters, as well as the understanding that grows between the two during "months of interrogation".

Gary Giddins, printing his review from the 16 August 2005 issue of The New York Sun, praised the film as "the most interesting and resonant" of Deray's work, and gave particular credit to Trintignant's "hair-trigger" performance. He also complimented the detail in the secondary characters, and said it was honest in its support for the death penalty. Giddins also, however, criticised the film's pacing.
