= Seznec affair =

1923–24 French legal case

The Seznec Affair was a controversial French court case of 1923–1924.

The wood merchant Pierre Quéméneur disappeared on the night of 25 to 26 May 1923, during his business trip from Brittany to Paris. He was reportedly connected to negotiations for the sale of stocks of cars left behind by the United States Army in the aftermath of World War I, with the stocks offered for sale to the Soviet Union. Quéméneur's body was never recovered, but the head of a sawmill Joseph Marie Guillaume Seznec was arrested and charged with Quéméneur's murder. He was the last known person to have seen Quéméneur alive. Seznec was found guilty on 4 November 1924, and send to a prison in French Guiana.

Seznec was released in May 1947, with a decree of remission of his final sentence. He was mortally injured in a road accident in 1953, and died of his injuries in February 1954. In 2005, his case was posthumously reopened because of suspicions that he was framed for murder by a trainee inspector with a history of manipulating evidence. In December 2006, the Cour de révision refused to annul Seznec's conviction, judging that there was no new evidence to call doubt on Seznec's guilt.

== Events ==
Joseph Marie Guillaume Seznec, born in Plomodiern, Finistère, in 1878 and the head of a sawmill at Morlaix, was found guilty of false promise and of the murder of the wood merchant Pierre Quéméneur, conseiller général of Finistère. Among other things, Quéméneur had strangely disappeared on the night of 25 to 26 May 1923 during a business trip from Brittany to Paris with Seznec, a trip that was linked (according to Seznec) to the sale of stocks of cars (left behind in France after the First World War by the American Army) to the Soviet Union. Though many other possibilities were advanced as to the disappearance and despite the body never being recovered, it was decided to pursue only the murder hypothesis. Seznec became the prime suspect as the last person to have seen Quéméneur alive and was arrested, charged and imprisoned.

Seznec was found guilty on 4 November 1924. During his eight-day trial, nearly 120 witnesses were heard. The avocat général had demanded the death penalty, but since premeditation could not be proved, he was instead condemned to hard labour in perpetuity. He was taken to the prison of St-Laurent-du-Maroni in French Guiana in 1927 and transferred to the Îles du Salut penal colony in 1928.

Benefitting from a remission in his sentence in May 1947, he returned to Paris the following year. In 1953, in Paris, he was reversed into by a van, which then drove off (the driver, who was later questioned, claimed not to have seen anything) and died of his injuries on 13 February 1954.

== Possible miscarriage of justice ==
Throughout the trial and for the rest of his life, Seznec never stopped proclaiming his innocence. His descendants fought on to have the case reopened and clear his name (notably his grandson Denis Le Her-Seznec). Until today, all their attempts (nine total) have failed.

The Commission de révision des condamnations pénales nevertheless accepted, on 11 April 2005, a reopening of Guillaume Seznec's conviction for murder. This decision could open the way to an eventual annulling of his conviction in 1924. The criminal chamber of the Court of Cassation, France's supreme judicial court, examined the case on 5 October 2006. At this point, Avocat général Jean-Yves Launay required the benefit of the doubt, to Seznec's benefit, raising more particularly the possibility of a police plot - the trainee inspector Pierre Bonny (twenty years later to be assistant to Henri Lafont, head of the Gestapo française) and his superior, commissaire Vidal were charged in the inquiry. At his side, the conseiller rapporteur Jean-Louis Castagnède maintained the opposite opinion, deducing on the one hand any such manipulation seemed improbable due to the few acts established by Bonny and on the other that the experts solicited by the cour de cassation had established that Guillaume Seznec really was the author of the false promise of sale of Quéméneur's property seized at Plourivo.

On 14 December 2006, the Cour de révision refused to annul Seznec's conviction, judging there was no new evidence to call doubt on Seznec's guilt, since the implication of inspector Bonny is (though an interesting element in itself) neither new nor as important as thought. The affair seems closed and a new request for an annulment unlikely. The Seznec family at first intended to take the case to the European Court of Human Rights, but gave up on their lawyers' advice.

== The excavations of February 2018 ==
In 1978, Petit Guillaume, one of the sons of the Seznec spouses, reportedly told one of his nephews that on the day of the tragedy (he was then 11 years old) he had heard Pierre Quéméneur making advances to his mother and having seen him on the ground, at his mother's feet, perhaps hit in the head with a candlestick. Based on these comments, since the court refused to have searches carried out in light of the December 2006 decision of the Court of Revision, lawyer Denis Langlois decided to undertake private searches on 24 February 2018 with the consent of the owner of the Seznec residence in Morlaix, in an attempt to uncover Pierre Quéméneur's body. During the excavations in the old cellar and cellar, a bone was found, which led to the cessation of private searches and the intervention of the police and justice. According to a medical examiner, the bone recovered was a head of femur. An investigation entrusted to the judicial police in Rennes was opened. At this point, there is no absolute certainty that these are human bones.

== In popular culture ==
Several works have been published on the affair, and Yves Boisset directed the film L'Affaire Seznec in 1992, with Christophe Malavoy in the lead role and also starring Nathalie Roussel, Jean Yanne and Bernard Bloch.

The French band Tri Yann also wrote a few songs describing the affair.

== Bibliography ==
- Victor Hervé, Justice pour Seznec, Editions Hervé, 1933;
- Claude Bal, Seznec était innocent, Éditions de Paris, 1955;
- Yves Frédéric Jaffré, L'affaire Seznec, SEGEP, 1956;
- Jean Rieux - Lice Nedelec, Seznec...innocent ou prestidigitateur criminel ?, Jugant, Lorient, 1976;
- Marcel Julian; L'affaire Seznec, Les grandes enquêtes d'Europe, 1979;
- Denis Seznec, Nous les Seznec, Éditions Robert Laffont, Paris, 1992;
- Denis Langlois, L'Affaire Seznec, Pocket, 1993;
- Michel Keriel, Seznec. L'impossible réhabilitation, Éditions MEB, 1998; reédition LE MANUSCRIT, 2006;
- Aurélien Le Blé (Préface de Denis Seznec), Moi, Pierre Quemeneur, Éditions Alain Bargain, Quimper;
- Daniel Le Petitcorps, Seznec En quête de vérité, Éditions Le Télégramme, 2003, ISBN 2-84833-058-9;
- Bernez Rouz, L'affaire Quéméneur Seznec - Enquête sur un mystère, Éditions Apogée, Rennes, 2005;
- Pascal Bresson (préface de Denis Seznec), Guillaume Seznec, une vie retrouvée, Éditions Ouest-France, Rennes, 2006 ( Children's book inspired by Denis Le Her, Seznec's grandson);
- Guy Penaud, L'énigme Seznec, Éditions de La Lauze, Périgueux, 2006 .
- Cour de Cassation Affaire Guillaume Seznec, Arrêt n° 5813 of 14 December 2006;
- Nathalie Le Gendre, 49 302, Mango (Autres Mondes), 2006 .
- Albert Baker, "The Seznec mystery : revealed", 2008
- Denis Langlois, Pour en finir avec l'affaire Seznec, Éditions de la Différence, 2015.
- Bertrand Vilain " L'affaire Seznec : Les archives du FBI ont parlé " Mr Brocanteur éditeur . 2022, (ISBN 978-2-9571560-0-9)
