= Pierre Bonny =

French detective, Gestapo officer, and Nazi collaborator

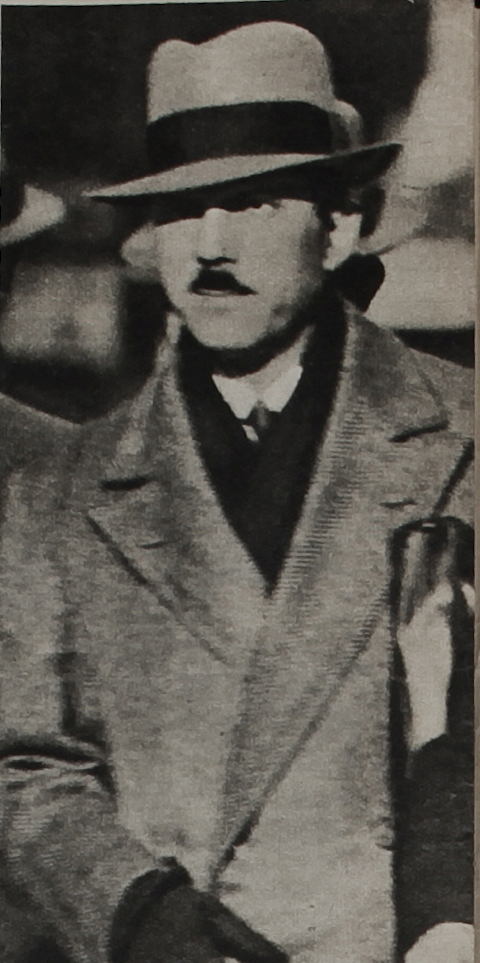
- Pierre Bonny in 1934
- Born: 25 January 1895; Bordeaux, French Third Republic
- Died: 27 December 1944 (aged 49); Fort de Montrouge, Arcueil, France
- Occupation: Policeman
- Status: Executed by firing squad
- Allegiance: Nazi Germany; Vichy France
- Conviction: Treason
- Penalty: Death

Pierre Bonny (25 January 1895 – 27 December 1944) was a French police officer. As an inspector, he was the investigating officer in the 1923 Seznec case, and was accused of falsifying the evidence. He was once praised as one of the most talented police officers in the country, and helped to solve the notorious Stavisky financial scandal in 1934. In 1935 he was jailed for three years on corruption charges.

During World War II, France was occupied by Nazi Germany. Bonny became a collaborator and joined the French Gestapo, known as the Carlingue. After the Liberation of Paris he was put on trial and convicted of war crimes. He was executed by firing squad on 27 December 1944, alongside career criminal Henri Lafont and footballer-turned-crook Alexandre Villaplane.

Besides the public memory of him as a traitor and unscrupulous collaborator, he is commonly seen as emblematic of the corruption of the Vichy regime.

He is held to be the basis for the character of Monsieur Philibert in Patrick Modiano's wartime novel La Ronde de Nuit (The Night Watch).

== Early life ==
Bonny was born on 25 January 1895, in Bordeaux, France. His parents were farmers. After finishing his secondary education in Bordeaux, he briefly found office work at a Peugeot branch, and then at the Compagnie générale transatlantique (or the French Line). In December 1915, he was drafted and became a POW shortly thereafter during the Battle of the Somme. He remained imprisoned for the majority of the war. Repatriated to France in 1918, he was posted as secretary to the general staff of the Bordeaux military region, with the rank of corporal.

== Police work (1920–1927) ==
In 1919, Bonny took the police exam and became an inspector in the provisional police force that was operating in liberated regions. He married Blanche Émie in 1920, and worked in Somme, France, before being transferred to the oversight unit of the Sûreté générale's forensic investigation services in Paris on August 11, 1922. He spent the rest of his career there, working under divisional commissioners Vidal, Granger, and then Hennet until his termination in January, 1935. The Sûreté, nicknamed "The Secret", was under the command of the Minister of the Interior, and was located on the rue des Saussaies. Their jurisdiction was extensive, and included the policing of gambling, associations, labor unions and other groups with the potential to cause civil unrest, surveillance of foreigners and counter-espionage, as well as business, press, and publishing. Although they were responsible for the entire region, the Sûreté's budget was limited compared to that of its rival, the Paris Police Prefecture and its Directorate of Judicial Police.

=== Counter-intelligence ===
This is a period of uncertainty in Bonny's career. It is thought that Bonny was temporarily dispatched to work in counterintelligence for the Minister of War. According to his son, Jacques Bonny, he resolved a number of leaks, which supposedly earned him favor with General Maud'huy. The date of these events is uncertain. Maurice Garçon believes they took place before Bonny entered the police force, but Jacques Bonny, drawing from an anonymous article in the magazine Le Nouveau Détective in the early 1930s, places these events in the early 1920s.

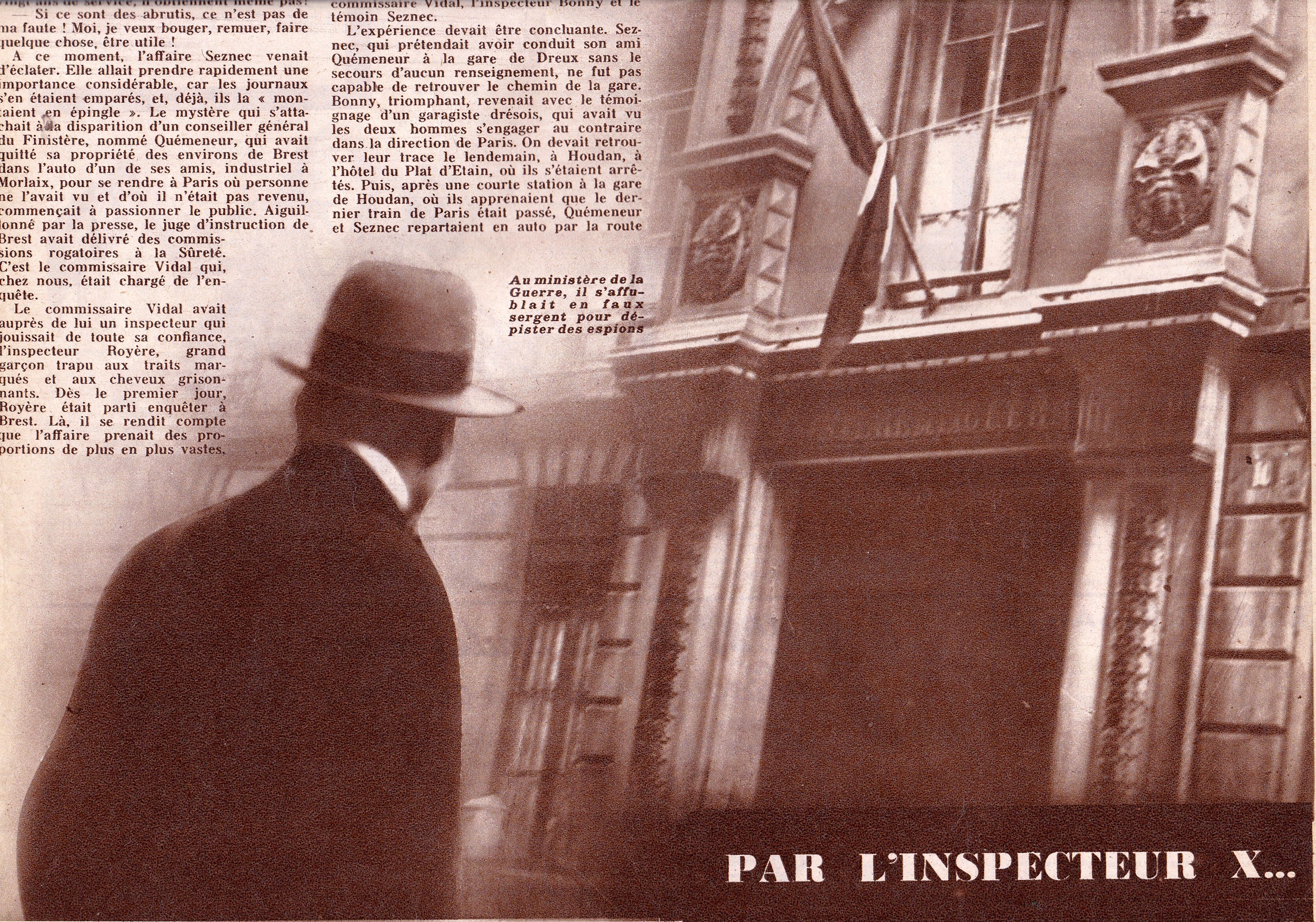
At the Ministry of War he disguised himself as a sergeant to catch spies

Bonny's principal biographer Guy Prenaud commented: "one wonders whether it was not at that time, having then acquired the reputation of a particularly capable man, that some people thought of employing Pierre Bonny for work that was rather confidential, but undoubtedly a little undesirable because it was on the borderline of legality,", whereas Jacques Bonny has been quoted saying: "No sooner had he joined the police force than, thanks to luck and his special skills, he unconsciously got his dick caught in the wringer, perhaps the most dangerous one of all: 'parapolitics', so as not to say politics in general."

=== Seznec Affair ===
In January 1923, Bonny obtained the grade of trainee inspector at the Sûreté générale. Posted as a "clerical secretary" to Commissioner Achille Vidalin in June 1923, he became involved in the Seznec affair, but played only a minor role. The case cited over 500 minutes of meetings and other records, and Bonny's name appeared in four meeting records (one of which he drew up himself), and also in five reports. Bonny did not discover the famous typewriter, one of the key pieces of evidence in the Seznec Affair, but did transport the typewriter to Paris for examination as part of the investigation.

Bonny's presence in the investigation took on considerable importance much later. Joseph Marie Guillaume Seznec's post-war defense, based on late testimony, has Bonny orchestrating the conspiracy and the author of allegedly false witness statements against Seznec. After the request for revision made in 1955 by the journalist Claude Bal, this was one of the arguments formed by the lawyer and writer Denis Langlois in 1977, and is among those newly presented in 2001 by Jean-Denis Bredin.

=== First successes and "secret missions" ===
Tenured in September 1924, Bonny quickly acquired "a reputation as a skilled and shrewd policeman" according to Philippe Aziz.

He helped to resolve a scam run by the so-called "Marquis Élie de Champeaubert." Bonny disguised himself as a jeweler and went to meet with Clément Passal, who was running the scam in question. Passal gassed Bonny with chloroform in an attempt to steal the merchandise that Bonny was ostensibly selling. The same year, Bonny was assigned to investigate a money laundering scheme organized by Cardinal Andrieu, archbishop of Bordeaux, who was moving money into Switzerland. The case was resolved quietly, but according to the lawyer and historian Maurice Garçon, it played a role in allowing Aristide Briand to put pressure on Pope Pius XI to publicly condemn the right-wing political group Action Française in 1926.
