= Mandel Szkolnikoff =

French businessman and Nazi collaborator (1895–1945)

- Born: 28 January 1895; Sharkawshchyna, Russian Empire
- Died: 10 June 1945 (aged 50); El Molar, Madrid, Spain
- Cause of death: Assassinated by French intelligence
- Occupation: Businessman

Mandel Szkolnikoff (28 January 1895 – 10 June 1945), better known as Michel Szkolnikoff, was a Belarusian-French businessman, franc billionaire, and Nazi collaborator. During the German occupation of France, he made a fortune by supplying the Kriegsmarine and the Schutzstaffel, mainly with textiles. After the war, Szkolnikoff fled to Francoist Spain, but was killed during an attempted abduction by French intelligence.

== Early life ==
Mandel Szkolnikoff was born on 28 January 1895 in Sharkawshchyna in the Russian Empire, now in Belarus. He was Jewish. He had a German passport.

== Career ==
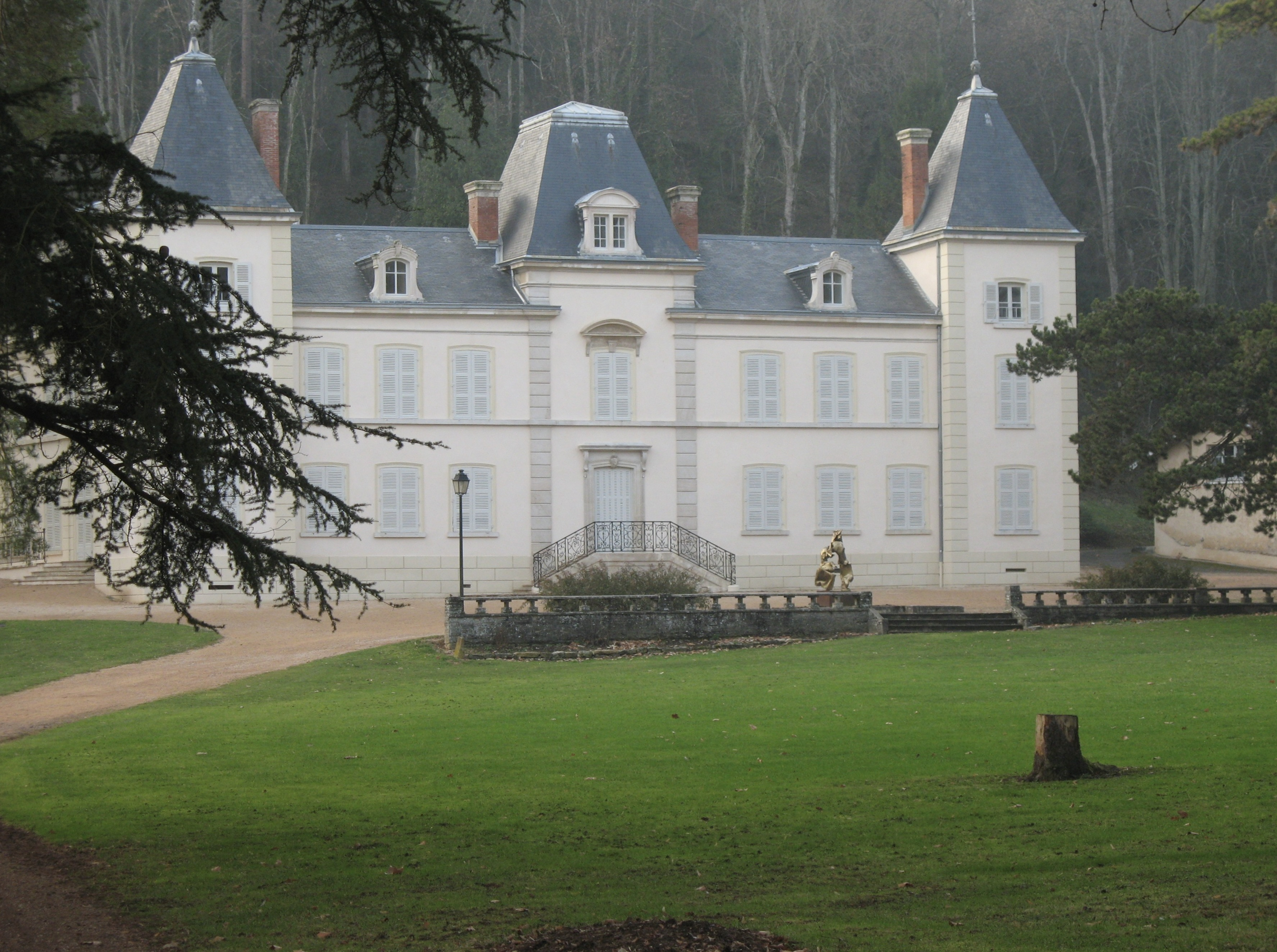
Château d'Aine in Azé, property of Mandel Szkolnikoff

Szkolnikoff was a major economic collaborator in the occupied France during the Second World War. Less known than Joseph Joanovici, he made a considerable fortune by supplying the Kriegsmarine and then the SS, mainly in textiles, and was described as "the man who pushed the practice of black market to an extreme."

He reinvested his returns to build a real estate empire.

== Death ==
Szkolnikkoff died in unclear circumstances on 10 June 1945 near Madrid in Spain. The most generally accepted theory now is that he was unintentionally killed during an attempted kidnapping in Spain by French intelligence. In 1944, the Direction générale des études et recherches, the secret service agency of the Provisional Government of the French Republic, created a group to abduct or kill French collaborators who had hidden in Francoist Spain. Members of this group set up a plan to capture Szkolnikoff and exfiltrate him to France. Under the pretext of reselling jewelry, he was lured to Madrid to be abduct and repatriated to France. However, Szkolnikoff fought back, after which he was knocked out, drugged, and put in a car truck headed towards the French border. While on the road, however, the agents noticed that Szkolnikoff had died. They disposed of the body in a field under the bridge, after dousing it with gasoline and setting it on fire. The partly charred body was later found by a peasant.
