= Émile Buisson =

French gangster (1902–1956)

Émile "Mimile" Buisson
- Born: 1902
- Died: 1956 (aged 53–54)

Émile "Mimile" Buisson (19 August 1902 – 28 February 1956) was a French gangster and French public enemy No. 1 for 1950. A member of the French Gang des Tractions Avant, Buisson was responsible for over thirty murders and a hundred robberies. Buisson was pursued and caught by French detective Roger Borniche of the Sûreté Nationale and was executed in 1956 by the guillotine. Borniche's memoirs on the pursuit, Flic Story, were later made into a film of the same name in 1975, with Buisson portrayed by Jean-Louis Trintignant and Alain Delon playing the role of Roger Borniche.

Buisson was born in Paray-le-Monial, Saône-et-Loire, and was jailed at the age of 16 for pickpocketing, swindling, and possessing an offensive weapon. He was exiled to Shanghai with his brother for 5 years. Upon returning to France, Buisson was involved in a number of crimes and murders, becoming a member of Paris' criminal organizations, and took part in a hold-up of Troyes in 1937. In 1941, Buisson killed a passenger on board a security van during a robbery and was captured by police during an identity check. Buisson was regarded as criminally insane and was committed to a psychiatric hospital, only to escape in 1947 with the help of Roger Dekker. Becoming French public enemy No. 1 for 1950, Buisson was eventually captured by Roger Borniche and was executed by guillotine in 1956, being buried at Ivry Cemetery.
