= Henri Lafont =

French Gestapo head (1902–1944)

Henry Lafont
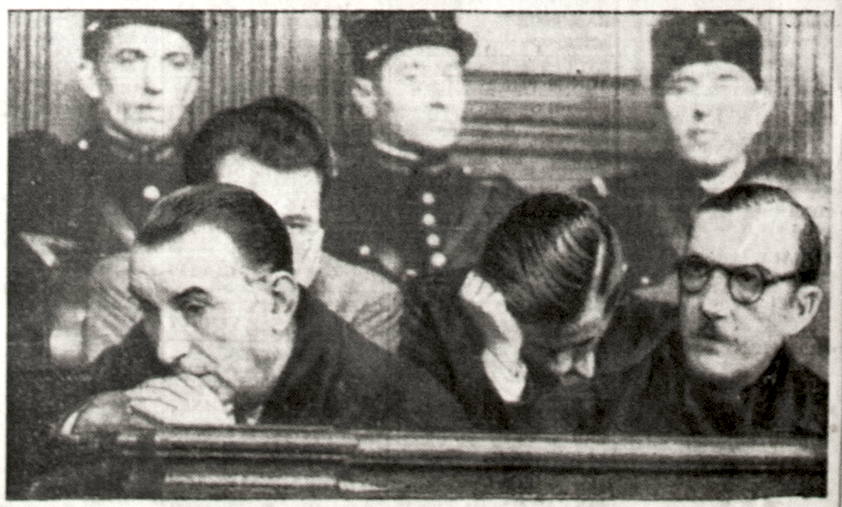
- Lafont (front left) during his trial
- Born: Henri Chamberlin; 22 April 1902; Paris, France
- Died: 26 December 1944 (aged 42); Fort de Montrouge, Arcueil, France
- Status: Executed by firing squad
- Allegiance: Nazi Germany; Vichy France
- Conviction: Treason
- Penalty: Death

Henri Lafont (born Henri Chamberlin, 22 April 1902 – 26 December 1944) was an underworld figure who headed the Carlingue, French auxiliaries for the German security services, during the German occupation of France in World War II.

He was executed by firing squad on 26 December 1944 alongside corrupt policeman Pierre Bonny and footballer-turned-criminal Alexandre Villaplane.

== Early life ==
Henri Louis Chamberlin grew up in a working-class environment. His father was a typesetter and his mother a housecleaner. His father died when he was 11 and his mother was said to have abandoned him on the day of the burial in 1912. Left to his own devices, he frequently wandered in the Paris market of Les Halles, working as a courier or laborer.

In 1919 he was sent to a youth correctional facility until he turned 18 for stealing a bicycle. On his release, he was drafted into the 39th Regiment of Algerian tirailleurs. When he was discharged two years later he was sentenced to two years in prison and ten years of banishment from Paris for receiving a stolen vehicle. While in prison he met two men who later became his associates, Lionel de Wiet, a cocaine addict who posed as an aristocrat, and Adrien Estébétéguy, known as "the Basque" or "Cold-Hand", a violent thug from Toulouse who served eight sentences for robbery. He also married while in prison, at Aix-en-Provence, and later had two children.

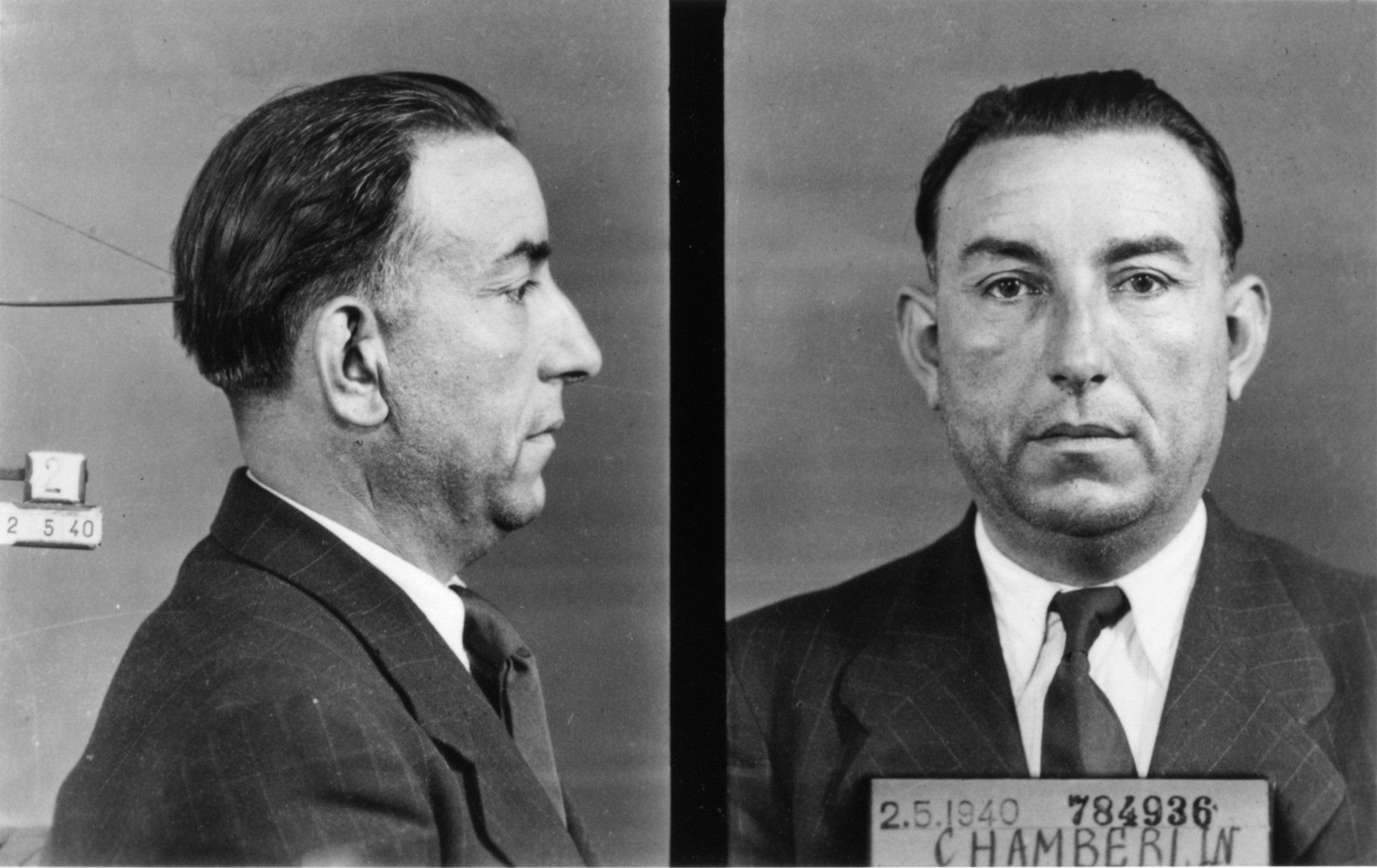

He settled in Saint-Jean-de-Maurienne, where he found work. After a theft of 2000 francs from the store where he worked, he was sent to a prison camp in Cayenne. He changed his name to Norman, then Lafont.

== Chamberlin to Lafont ==
In early 1940, Chamberlin was running a Simca dealership as Henri Normand in the outer Parisian quarter of Porte des Lilas and made contacts among the police. He joined a volunteer brigade but was arrested in Paris for desertion. In June 1940, he was sent to Cherche-Midi prison, then, as the Wehrmacht advanced, to a camp in Cepoy. There, he met a German spy named Karl Hennecke and a Swiss spy named Max Stoecklin, who had been an Abwehr agent for Hermann Brandl since 1934 and escaped with them.

== "Why not work with us?" ==
He returned to Paris, by then occupied, with his fellow escapees, members of the Abwehr. Lafont later remarked: "If the guys on the other side, the resistance, had suggested something to me, I would have done it no question. But in July and August 1940, I didn't know about the resistance and hadn't seen anything. I didn't even know what it was."

Agent Max Stoecklin, his fellow prison escapee, set him up as a buying agent for the Wehrmacht, in charge of appropriating French wealth. He made himself useful, buying everything from clothes to furniture to food, and came to the attention of Hermann Brandl, Abwehr special agent, and of captain Wilhelm Radecke of the Wehrmacht. He moved several times and wound up at 93 rue Lauriston, the property of a Madame Weinberg before the war.

In July 1940, Lafont and Radecke recruited 27 felons from Fresnes prison. Colonel Oscar Reile, their superior, ordered Lafont's arrest on learning of the freed prisoners.

Radecke warned Lafont of this and suggested he find one of the leaders of the anti-Nazi resistance, former Belgian spymaster Otto Lambrecht, sought by the Abwehr, whose capture would earn the favor of the authorities. Lafont arrested Lambrecht in the zone libre (Note: helped by Robert AKA "le fantassin" I (the fantasist), Hirbes AKA "la rigole" (the Lulz) and Estebéteguy "Adrien la main froide" (Adrian Cold Hand) or "Adrien le Basque' (Adrien the Basque), who later ended his days in the oven of doctor Petiot)) and brought him back to Gestapo headquarters in Paris in the trunk of his car, bound hand and foot. There he tortured him with his own hands. This resulted in the dismantlement of Belgian counter-espionage after the arrests of 600 people.

He joined the police and was given badge number 6474 R. He reigned over a band of around one hundred felons and enjoyed almost complete immunity. A system of penalties from fines to death sanctioned those who did not obey his rules. The band was made up of gangsters and other felons, but also of corrupt policemen. The best-known, Pierre Bonny, became his lieutenant.

== Failure in Algiers ==
Near the end of 1940, Hermann Brandl asked Lafont to smuggle an agent into North Africa, so he could install a secret transmitter for communicating with German authorities. Lafont made camp with his team at Cap Doumia near Algiers. But two of his accomplices were arrested by the police and the mission failed. Lafont was sentenced to death in absentia.

== Pillage, parties and torture ==
The Germans used the Bonny-Lafont gang to checkmate the Resistance, and they excelled at this task.

Torture was common in interrogations: prisoners' fingernails were torn out, and their teeth filed. They were beaten, kicked, and burned with cigarettes or welding torches; water torture and electric shocks were also inflicted. The gang allegedly also carried out assassinations sponsored by the Germans.

In 1942, the Carlingue was put under the authority of the Gestapo. Lafont outdid himself to please his new superiors, notably giving a sumptuous Bentley as a wedding gift to Helmut Knochen, an aide to Heydrich charged with bringing the secret police to France.

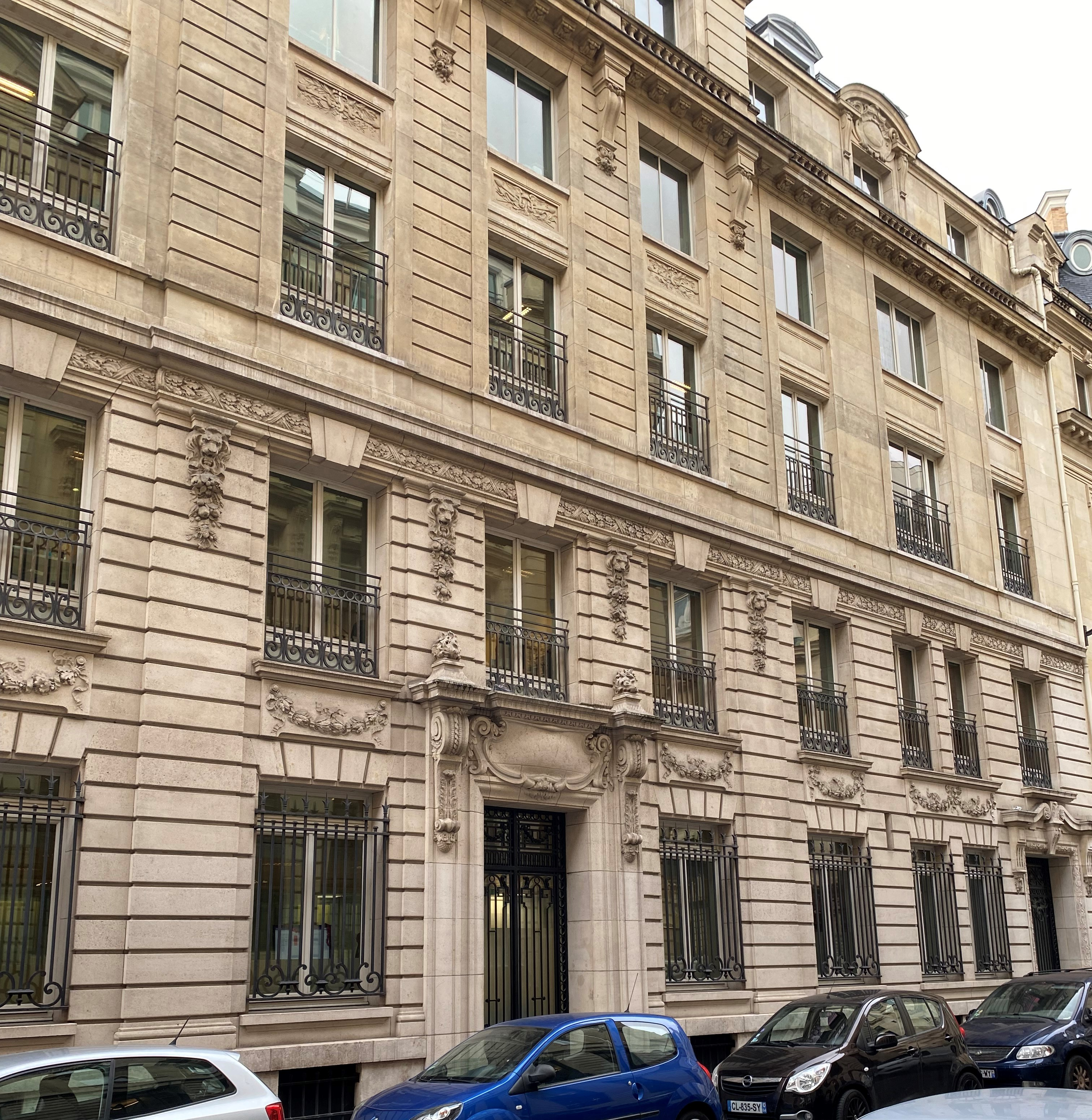
5 rue Pillet-Wills

In early 1942, he reached an understanding with the Devisenschutzkommando (DSK) (Detachment for currency security) based at 5 rue Pillet-Will, which was tasked with the very lucrative battle against the black market. He received a commission of up to 20% on these transactions. It was a matter of introducing himself into high society, gaining the confidence of its members, and concentrating on people with problems who wanted to hide money in Switzerland or obtain travel passes. At the meetup, team members would produce their police credentials and seize the currency. When their victims were Jewish, the team not only confiscated everything but also took them to the SD on Avenue Foch. The gang also committed many burglaries, calling them police raids; in December 1942 Lafont shared fine china looted from the former American embassy among the most prominent German restaurants of Paris.

Lafont, a former petty criminal, became the most important man in France, lived large and enjoyed having important people ask him for favors. He organised many society soirées and took his superiors out to the best cabarets and nightclubs of Paris, such as the One-Two-Two. He visited these establishments, many of which his gang was extorting, in German uniform, which displeased the Wehrmacht information services.

Frequent visitors to "the 93" included police prefect Amédée Bussière, journalist Jean Luchaire, actress Yvette Lebon and her daughter, as well as quite a few women known as the Countesses of the Gestapo. Lafont was on familiar terms with René Bousquet and Pierre Laval, but his relationships with other collaborators like Fernand de Brinon were rather poor.

In 1943, the gang inflicted heavy losses on the Défense de la France network, with the arrests of some sixty members. Défense de la France survived the blow, but among those arrested was Geneviève de Gaulle, niece of the general, brought in on 20 July 1943 by former inspector Bonny.

Other Parisian gestapistes existed, with whom the Lafont-Bonny gang struggled for power: the "Corsican gang", the "Neuilly Gestapo", directed by Frédéric Martin alias Rudy de Mérode, once associated with Gédéon van Houten. The Lafont gang, with the support of the Gestapo, which appreciated its effectiveness against Resistance networks, managed to get these competitors deported.

At the beginning of 1944, Lafont proposed and, with Algerian nationalist Muhammad al-Maadi (a former French officer of La Cagoule), created the secret right-wing North African Legion, made up of men from North Africa. Wearing the uniform of the milice, the brigade saw combat against the résistance intérieure française: the Maquis du Limousin (three sections saw combats against the maquis de Corrèze, notably Tulle), then the Périgord in Dordogne, (one section) with the massacre of 52 hostages at Mussidan. in Sainte-Marie-de-Chignac 23 hostages executed or in an abandoned quarry near Brantôme 26 hostages including Georges Dumas, shot on the command of Alexandre Villaplane and in Franche-Comté (one section). The legion was dissolved in July 1944 and dispersed. Some of its former members went with el-Maadi to Germany and others joined the Free India Legion SS Freies Indien Legion).

=== Trial and sentence ===
Bonny and Henri Chamberlin, a.k.a. Lafont, were interrogated at the Conciergerie.

Brought before the investigating magistrate, Pierre Bonny confessed everything and implicated more than a thousand other people in the "rue Lauriston affair". A wave of panic swept Paris, especially after the discovery of the black market in false Resistance certificates.

The trial started 1 December 1944 and ended on 11 December. A few people testified on Lafont's behalf about his service, including resistance fighters for whom he had done favors or whose family members he had saved. At the farm the police found 2.5 million francs in small bills in a laundry basket.

When the verdict condemning them both to death was read, Pierre Bonny had to be held up by the gendarmes, while Lafont seemed very relaxed, with a smile on his lips.

On 26 December, Lafont faced a firing squad at the Fort de Montrouge. Moments before he told his lawyer, maître Drieu:

I regret nothing, Madame. Four years surrounded by orchids, dahlias and Bentleys were worth it! I have lived ten times faster, is all. Tell my son to always stay out of the caves. May he be a man like his father!

Henri Chamberlin/Lafont declined a blindfold and died tied to the stake bareheaded with a cigarette between his lips.

The French Connection was purportedly financed with funds from the Carlingue via Auguste Ricord, Lafont's employee, arrested in September 1972 in the United States.

== See also ==
- Georges Delfanne
- Rudy de Mérode
- Milice
- Art Looting Investigation Unit
- Business collaboration with Nazi Germany

== Bibliography ==
- Grégory Auda (2002). Les belles années du "milieu", 1940-1944: le grand banditisme dans la machine répressive allemande en France (in French). Paris: Éditions Michalon. p. 254. ISBN 2-84186-164-3. OCLC 50493997. Reissued:
  - Grégory Auda (2013). Les belles années du "milieu', 1940-1944: le grand banditisme dans la machine répressive allemande en France (in French). Paris: Éditions Michalon. p. 253. ISBN 978-2-84186-678-6.
- Philippe Aziz (1972). Au service de l'ennemi: la Gestapo française en province 1940-1944. Paris: Fayard. p. 186. OCLC 4173712.
- Philippe Aziz. Tu trahiras sans vergogne: histoire de deux collabos, Bonny et Lafont. Paris: Livre de poche. p. 379. OCLC 1206738.
- Jean-Marc Berlière (2018). Polices des temps noirs: France, 1939-194 (in French). Paris: Perrin. p. 1357. ISBN 978-2-262-03561-7.
- Luc Briand (2022). Alexandre Villaplane, capitaine des Bleus et officier nazi (in French). Paris: Plein Jour. p. 271. ISBN 978-2-370-67074-8. OCLC 723952731.
- Jacques Delarue (1993). Trafics et crimes sous l'Occupation (in French). Paris: Fayard. ISBN 978-2-21303-154-5. OCLC 722598561.
- Cyril Eder (2006). Les Comtesses de la Gestapo (in French). Paris: Grasset. p. 257. ISBN 978-2-246-67401-6. OCLC 723952731.
- Serge Jacquemard (1992). La bande Bonny-Lafont [The Bonny-Lafont Gang]. Paris: Fleuve noir. p. 217. ISBN 978-2-265-04673-3. OCLC 40382542.
- Jean-François Miniac (2009). Les Grandes Affaires criminelles du Doubs. Romagnat: De Borée. p. 362. ISBN 978-2-84494-959-2. OCLC 690431283. (about Roger Griveau)
- Patrice Rolli, La Phalange nord-africaine (ou Brigade nord-africaine, ou Légion nord-africaine) en Dordogne: Histoire d'une alliance entre la Pègre et la Gestapo; 15 March-19 August 1944, Éditions l'Histoire en Partage, 2013, 189 pages (mostly about Alexandre Villaplane and Raymond Monange)
- War and Peace in the Western Political Imagination: From Classical Antiquity to the Age of Reason by Roger B. Manning Bloomsbury classical studies monographs, Roger B. Manning, Bloomsbury Academic, 2016 ISBN 9781474258708
- German Colonial Wars and the Context of Military Violence by Susanne Kuss
- Passchendaele: The Lost Victory of World War I by Nick Lloyd Basic Books, 2017 ISBN 9780465094783
- Hitler's Compromises: Coercion and Consensus in Nazi Germany by Nathan Stoltzfus
- Paris at War: 1939–1944 by David Drake
- Snow and Steel: The Battle of the Bulge, 1944–45 by Peter Caddick-Adams
