= Romanticization =

Unrealistically positive depiction

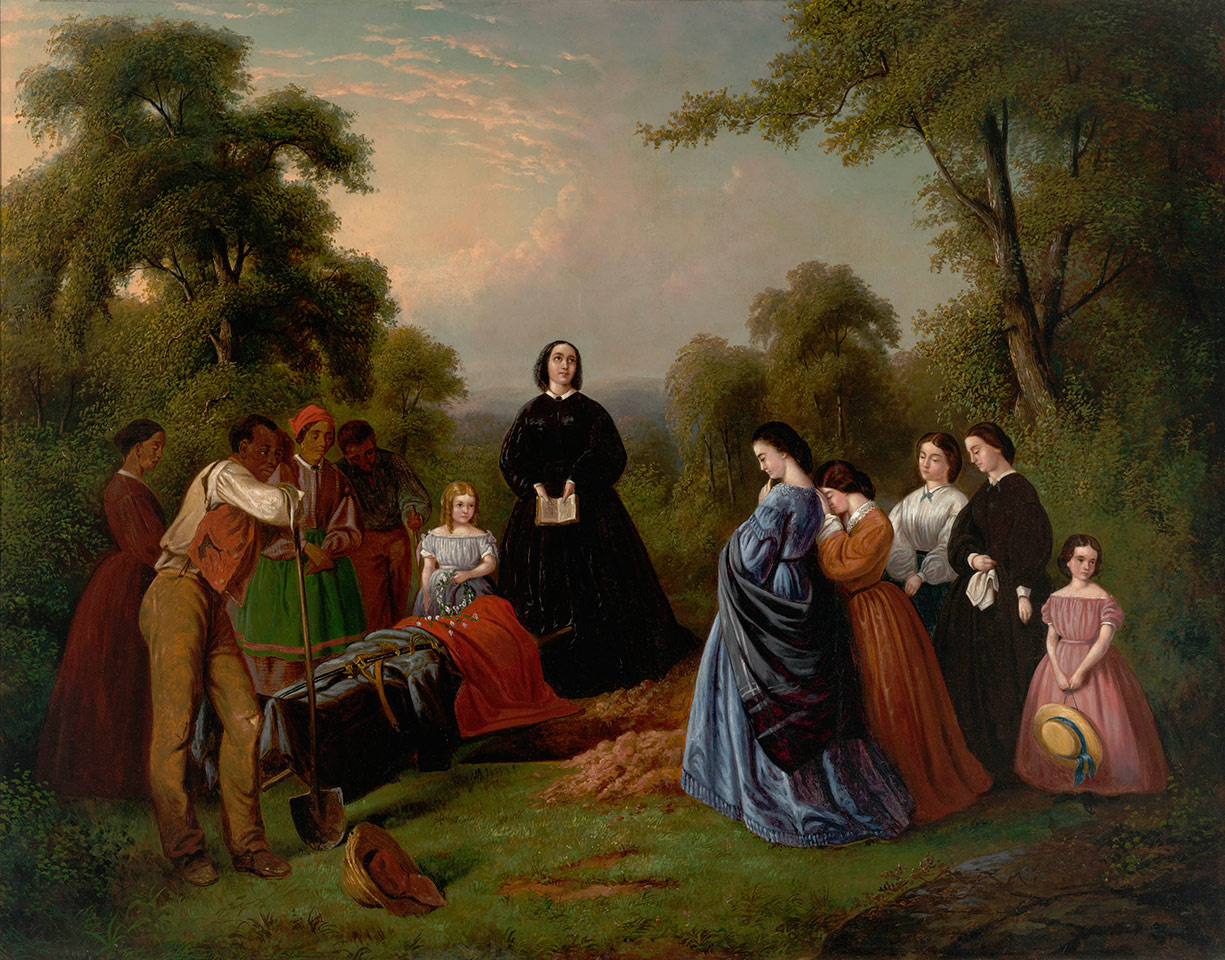
The Burial of Latané by William D. Washington, 1864, romanticizes slavery in the United States by portraying enslaved African Americans as loyal subjects.

Romanticization is the act of treating a subject as more desirable or attractive than it is in reality. Common subjects of romanticization in popular culture include nature, crime, abuse, mental illness, war, and history. Historical romance is a genre of historical fiction which involves such romanticization to amplify the experience of love, and according to Anita Desai, myth itself is a romanticization of history. Romanticization is often associated with nostalgia, the concept of longing for the past, although the two terms are not synonymous. While nostalgia is known for its tendency to romanticize, it can also arise from genuine memory.

== Etymology ==
Romanticize derives from the word romantic. According to the Oxford English Dictionary, the English word romanticize dates to an 1818 letter by English poet Samuel Taylor Coleridge, thus the historian Carl Thompson considers him to have coined the word. The German translation of the word, romantisieren, was previously coined in the 1797–98 writings of the poet Novalis in a series of terms related to his new definition of the romantisch. Novalis wrote that:

By conferring on secret things an elevated meaning, on the everyday a mysterious prestige, on the known the dignity of the unknown, on the finite the appearance of the infinite, I romanticize them.

A leading member of the Romantic movement in Germany, Novalis sought to imbue the concept of the romantic with a deeper significance by highlighting untruth or strangeness as its defining characteristic.

== Violence ==
The romanticization of violence has persisted across periods of human history and unto the present day, despite living alongside a desire to eradicate it. The tradition of Bronze Age poetry which emerged in ancient Greece, the ancient Near East, and beyond evidently display such romanticization.

=== War ===
The history of the romanticization of war in fiction can be traced through the Iliad, medieval romances, Shakespeare's plays, and the emergence of war memoirs in the 19th century, but according to literary historians Paul Fussell and Yuval Noah Harari, this romanticization in literature slowly ended following the devastating impact of the First and Second World Wars. The romanticized view of war is still prevalent in cultural and political discourse, where war is often seen as a worthwhile mean to the end of a constructive legacy and romanticized narratives of war can help governments to recruit citizens to fight as soldiers.
