= Graphic charter =

Project document

A graphic charter is a document containing the rules regarding the graphic identity of a project, company or organisation. It represents a broadening of the entity's visual identity beyond printed matter and signage to encompass media platforms and audio signatures.

== See also ==
- Corporate identity
- Style guide
