= Carlingue =

French collaborationist organization

Coordinates: 48.86743°N 2.288167°E

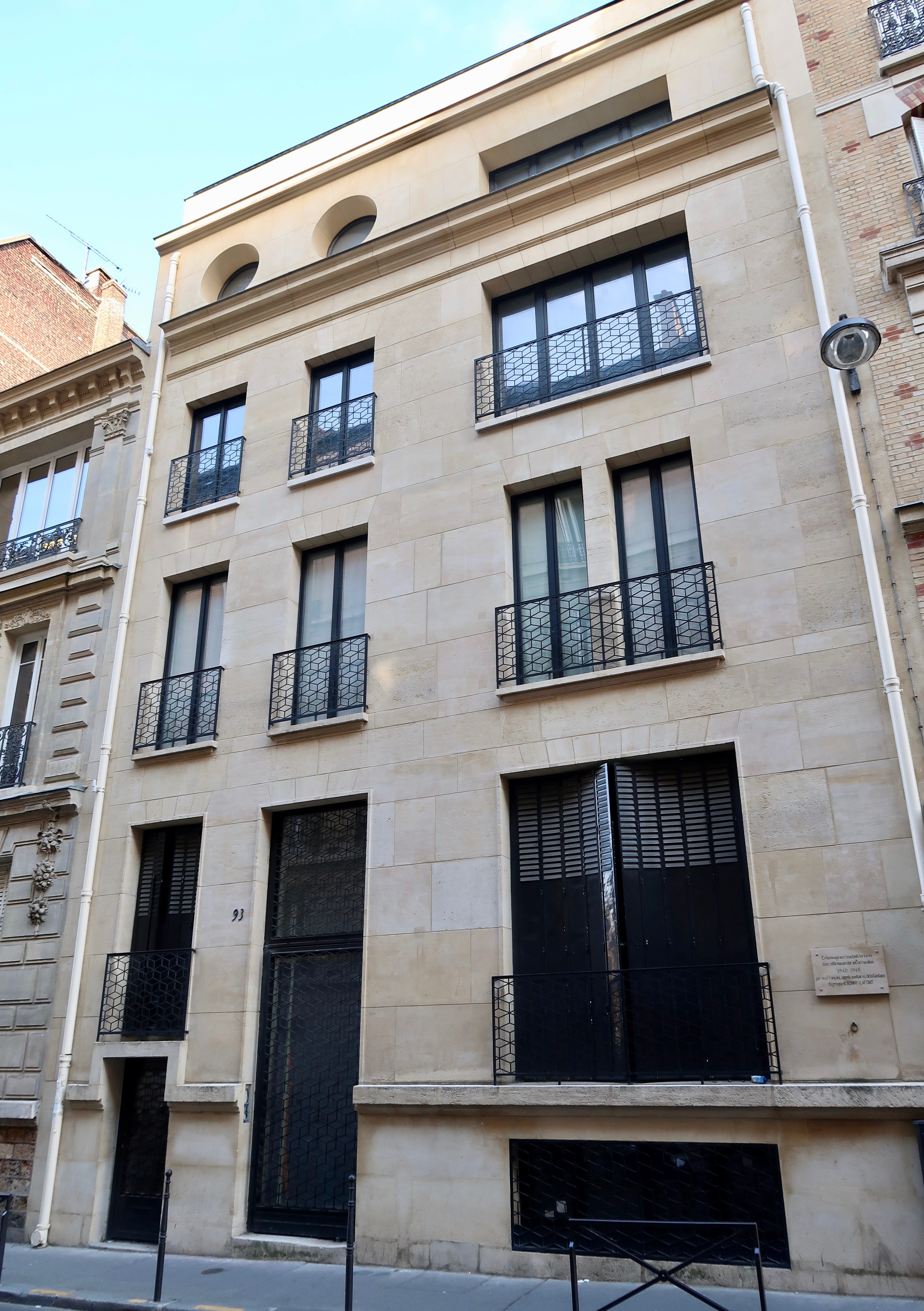
The building at 93, rue Lauriston in Paris in which the Carlingue were based. That is commemorated by a plaque on the site.

The Carlingue (or French Gestapo) were French auxiliaries who worked for the Gestapo, Sicherheitsdienst and Geheime Feldpolizei during the German occupation of France in the Second World War.

The group, which was based at 93 rue Lauriston in the 16th arrondissement of Paris, was active between 1941 and 1944. It was initiated by Pierre Bonny (1895–1944), a former policeman. Later it was managed jointly by Henri Lafont and Pierre Loutrel, two professional criminals who had been active in the French underworld before the war.

== Name ==
Carlingue [kaʁ.lɛ̃ɡ] in French means the cabin (or central body of an aircraft). The unit used this as a euphemistic nickname to indicate it was an organisation with structure and strength. The group was also known externally as the Bonny-Lafont gang, after Pierre Bonny and Henri Lafont.

The Reich Security Main Office (RSHA) officially referred to the Carlingue as Active Group Hesse after the SS officer "who'd looked after its foundation". It was also known as the Gestapo française de la rue Lauriston or the La Bande Bonny-Lafont.

== History ==
The unit was formed in 1941 by the RSHA. Its purpose was to perform counterinsurgency operations against the maquis resistance forces in German-occupied and Vichy France. The Carlingue recruited its members from the same criminal milieu as that of its founders. Both Henri Lafont and Pierre Loutrel (alias Pierrot le fou, "Crazy Pete") were criminals in the Parisian underworld before the war. Another member, the former police officer Pierre Bonny, had been wanted by the French authorities for misappropriation of funds and selling influence in the Seznec and Stavisky affairs.

Many others of the Carlingue were from the disbanded North African Brigades. The partly criminal nature of the organisation gave it access to contacts such as informers, corrupt officials, and disreputable businesspeople such as Joseph Joanovici. Members were also active in the black market.

According to retired policeman Henri Longuechaud, "one might be scandalised by the numbers of 30,000 to 32,000 sometimes quoted [as members of the Carlingue]. In Paris, when the Germans launched a recruitment drive for 2,000 auxiliary policeman in their service, they received no fewer than 6,000 candidates." During the war, infamous French doctor and serial killer Marcel Petiot allegedly associated with Carlingue. His house was located in the same street as the Carlingue headquarters and he allegedly sometimes helped the group dispose of their victims' bodies.

During January and February 1944, the Carlingue, as members of the paramilitary Légion nord-Africaine (LNA) commanded by Alexandre Villaplane, wore German uniforms as part of Bandenbekämpfung operations against the French Resistance in the area around Tulle, in central France.

After the liberation of France in 1944, members of the Carlingue went into hiding. Many were caught, tried and condemned to death; some evaded arrest. One former Carlingue agent, Georges Boucheseiche, who died in Morocco in 1967, was employed by Service de Documentation Extérieure et de Contre-Espionnage, France's postwar external intelligence agency.

In August 2014, the government of Paris ordered the current owners of 93 rue Lauriston to restore the memorial plaque to the former headquarters of the Carlingue.

== Notable members ==
- Georges Pujol, a former resistance fighter who became a double agent for the Gestapo, arrested in August 1944 and shot.
- Henri Lafont, executed at Fort Montrouge 26 December 1944.
- Alexandre Villaplane executed at Fort Montrouge 27 December 1944.
- Clairé, executed at Fort Montrouge 27 December 1944.
- Engel, executed at Fort Montrouge 27 December 1944.
- Hare, executed at Fort Montrouge 27 December 1944.
- Louis "Eddy" Pagnon, a member of the North African Brigade, executed at Fort Montrouge on 27 December 1944.
- Pierre Bonny, sentenced to death and shot 29 December 1944.
- Charles Delval, executed in the courtyard of the Fresnes Prison in February 1945.
- Ganioles executed at Fort Montrouge 24 June 1946.
- Jourdan executed at Fort Montrouge 13 July 1946.
- Marcel Buat, sentenced to death in June 1946 and executed at Versailles 12 August 1946.
- Pierre Loutrel, died on 6 November 1946, five days after being shot in the bladder during a robbery at a Parisian jewellery store on avenue Kléber.
- Bernard Fallot, executed at Fort Montrouge on 1 October 1947.
- Maurice Bay, executed on 5 May 1950.
- Abel Danos, shot 13 March 1952.
- Raymond Monange, an officer from the North African Brigade, shot on 13 March 1952 at Fort Montrouge.
- Auguste Ricord (1911–1985) tried postwar in absentia for collaboration; served a 10-year sentence 1972–1982 in the United States for drug smuggling, but not retried for war crimes.

== See also ==
- Geheime Feldpolizei - the secret military police of the Wehrmacht in France.
- 84 Avenue Foch - Parisian headquarters of the Sicherheitsdienst.
- Special Brigades - a unit from the French police that specialized in fighting the French Resistance.
- Milice - a paramilitary force raised by Vichy France.
- Bezen Perrot - a comparable Breton nationalist formation
- Business collaboration with Nazi Germany

== Bibliography ==
- Othen, Christopher (2020). The King of Nazi Paris: Henri Lafont and the Gangsters of the French Gestapo. London: Biteback. ISBN 1785905465.
- Auda, Grégory (2002). Les belles années du "milieu", 1940–1944: le grand banditisme dans la machine répressive allemande en France (in French). Paris: Éditions Michalon. ISBN 2-84186-164-3. OCLC 50493997.
- Aziz, Philippe (1972). Au service de l'ennemi: la Gestapo française en province 1940–1944. Paris: Fayard. OCLC 4173712.
- Aziz, Philippe. Tu trahiras sans vergogne: histoire de deux collabos, Bonny et Lafont. Paris: Livre de poche. OCLC 1206738.
- Berlière, Jean-Marc (2018). Polices des temps noirs: France, 1939–194 (in French). Paris: Perrin. ISBN 978-2-262-03561-7.
- Briand, Luc (2022). Alexandre Villaplane, capitaine des Bleus et officier nazi (in French). Paris: Plein Jour. ISBN 978-2-370-67074-8. OCLC 723952731.
- Delarue, Jacques (1993). Trafics et crimes sous l'Occupation (in French). Paris: Fayard. ISBN 978-2-21303-154-5. OCLC 722598561.
- Eder, Cyril (2006). Les Comtesses de la Gestapo (in French). Paris: Grasset. ISBN 978-2-246-67401-6. OCLC 723952731.
- Jacquemard, Serge (1992). La bande Bonny-Lafont. Paris: Fleuve noir. ISBN 978-2-265-04673-3. OCLC 40382542.
- Miniac, jean-François (2009). Les Grandes Affaires criminelles du Doubs (in French). Romagnat: De Borée. ISBN 978-2-84494-959-2. OCLC 690431283. (about Roger Griveau)
- Patrice Rolli, La Phalange nord-africaine (ou Brigade nord-africaine, ou Légion nord-africaine) en Dordogne: Histoire d'une alliance entre la Pègre et la Gestapo; 15 March–19 August 1944, Éditions l'Histoire en Partage, 2013, (mostly about Alexandre Villaplane and Raymond Monange)
- Grégory Auda (2002). Les belles années du "milieu", 1940–1944: le grand banditisme dans la machine répressive allemande en France (in French). Paris: Éditions Michalon. ISBN 2-84186-164-3. OCLC 50493997.
- Philippe Aziz (1972). Au service de l'ennemi: la Gestapo française en province 1940–1944. Paris: Fayard. OCLC 4173712.
- Philippe Aziz. Tu trahiras sans vergogne: histoire de deux collabos, Bonny et Lafont. Paris: Livre de poche. OCLC 1206738.
- Jean-Marc Berlière (2018). Polices des temps noirs: France, 1939–1945 (in French). Paris: Perrin. ISBN 978-2-262-03561-7.
- Luc Briand (2022). Alexandre Villaplane, capitaine des Bleus et officier nazi (in French). Paris: Plein Jour. ISBN 978-2-370-67074-8. OCLC 723952731.
- Jacques Delarue (1993). Trafics et crimes sous l'Occupation. Paris: Fayard. ISBN 978-2-21303-154-5. OCLC 722598561.
- Cyril Eder (2006). Les Comtesses de la Gestapo (in French). Paris: Grasset. ISBN 978-2-246-67401-6. OCLC 723952731.
- Serge Jacquemard (1992). La bande Bonny-Lafont. Paris: Fleuve noir. ISBN 978-2-265-04673-3. OCLC 40382542.
- Jean-François Miniac (2009). Les Grandes Affaires criminelles du Doubs. Romagnat: De Borée. ISBN 978-2-84494-959-2. OCLC 690431283. (about Roger Griveau)
- Patrice Rolli, La Phalange nord-africaine (ou Brigade nord-africaine, ou Légion nord-africaine) en Dordogne: Histoire d'une alliance entre la Pègre et la Gestapo; 15 March–19 August 1944, Éditions l'Histoire en Partage, 2013, (mostly about Alexandre Villaplane and Raymond Monange)
