= Roger Borniche =

French writer (1919–2020)

Roger Borniche (7 June 1919 – 16 June 2020) was a French author and detective of the Sûreté nationale.

Borniche was born in Vineuil-Saint-Firmin, Oise. He started as a singer, but his fledgling musical career was interrupted by the German invasion of 1940. To make a living, he took a job as a store detective. In 1943, he joined the Sûreté nationale as Inspector to avoid being shipped to a forced labour detail. Assigned to hunt the Resistance, he instead helped partisans escape from occupied France. He deserted in 1944, only days before the D-Day invasion.

Upon the liberation of France in August, he was reinstated to the Sûreté nationale and assigned to enforce France's abortion laws. The next year, he was transferred to a homicide unit.

== Role in the capture of Emile Buisson ==
On 4 September 1947, he was assigned to capture the escaped murderer, Emile Buisson. Borniche kept critical investigative files in his office, forcing the other investigators to bargain with him for their contents; other investigators did the same. He also competed with the other agencies for informants, who tried to play the investigators against each other for more rewards. He was sometimes shadowed by other investigators and would have to lose his "tail" to meet with an informant.

Borniche's investigations depended on informants and on French records that required anyone staying at a hotel or renting a room to give their name and identity card number. Those records were forwarded to the Police. Borniche never admitted to striking his prisoners, but his writing shows that he was not surprised to find a prisoner already badly beaten on asking to interview him. He was able to bargain with informants by offering them a signed permit to remain in Paris (despite being banned from the city by other police forces) and by delaying distribution of official warrants by keeping the notices locked in his desk.

Borniche caught his target by forcing an informant to lead Buisson into a trap. Borniche and the Sûreté captured him eating lunch at a restaurant on 10 June 1950. Borniche was rewarded with a promotion to Chief inspector and a 30,000 Franc bonus.

== Retirement and work as an author ==
He retired in 1956 and formed his own detective agency in Paris. His first set of memoirs, Flic Story, became the basis of a 1975 film featuring Alain Delon as Borniche, portraying Borniche's real-life pursuit of Emile Buisson.

== Works ==
- 1975 : Flic Story
- 1975 : Le Gang
- 1976 : Le Play-boy
- 1977 : L'Indic
- 1977 : René la Canne
- 1978 : L'Archange
- 1980 : Le Gringo
- 1981 : Le Maltais
- 1981 : Le Ricain
- 1982 : Le Tigre
- 1983 : Le Boss
- 1985 : Vol d'un nid de bijoux
- 1986 : L'Affaire de la môme Moineau
- 1987 : Le Coréen
- 1989 : La cible
- 1990 : Kidnapping
- 1991 : Frenchie : Un Français au cœur de la filière californienne
- 1996 : Le privé
- 1998 : Homicide boulevard : Los Angeles
- 1999 : Dossiers très privés (nouvelles)
