= Georges Delfanne =

Belgian collaborator

- Born: 22 January 1913; Brussels, Belgium
- Died: 1 October 1947 (aged 34); Fort de Montrouge, Hauts-de-Seine, France
- Cause of death: Execution by firing squad
- Occupation: Spy during World War II

Georges Delfanne, called Christian Masuy (22 January 1913 – 1 October 1947) was a Belgian collaborator and spy during the German occupation of Belgium in World War II.

== Early life ==
He was born January 22, 1913, in Brussels. Prior to the war, Delfanne was a far-right Rexist militant and gained the confidence of Léon Degrelle (later a general in the Waffen SS). In the 1930s, he got Jews out of Germany in return for money but was in the process arrested in Cologne and recruited by the German intelligence services Abwehr. He got a task to discover everything he could about the deployment of the Belgian army. In the cover of travelling salesman, he travelled through Belgium on his bicycle visiting all kinds of military institutions. In some time he was able to create a complete picture of Belgian army's order of battle. This information helped to defeat Belgian army in 1940.

Arriving in France in 1940, he bought the services of the politicians Jacques Doriot and Marcel Bucard and became their handler. Under the occupation, he became an auxiliary of the Gestapo in France, sometimes presenting himself as "head of counter-espionage" in his sector. He infiltrated or organised the infiltration of French Resistance networks, notably the Parsifal and Défense de la France networks, and arrested more than 800 Resistance workers, some of whom he interrogated and tortured, notably Simone Michel-Lévy.

== Death ==
At the end of the war, he fled to Spain but was tracked down by the Americans, tried in France, condemned to death and shot by firing squad on 1 October 1947 at Fort de Montrouge (Hauts-de-Seine).
