= Maurice Garçon =

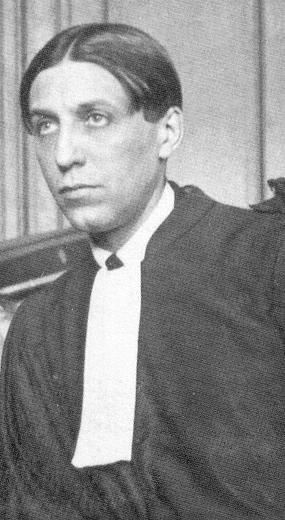
Maurice Garçon

Maurice Garçon (25 November 1889 in Lille – 29 December 1967 in Paris) was a French novelist, historian, essayist and lawyer. A major figure at the bar, he gained a certain notoriety and was even mentioned with René Floriot in the last phrase of Jean-Pierre Melville's film "Bob le flambeur".

== Legal Pleadings ==
- Plaidoyer pour René Hardy (1950) (Plea for René Hardy)
- Plaidoyer contre Naundorff (1955) (Plea against Naundorff)
- En marge de l'Immortel : un procès d'archéologie (1932) (On the Sidelines Of The Immortal: A Trial of Archaeology)
- En marge des fleurs du mal: un procès littéraire (1926) (Alongside the Flowers of Evil: A Literary Process)

== Works ==
- Le Diable, étude historique, critique et médicale (in collaboration with Jean Vinchon) (1926)
- La vie exécrable de Guillemette Babin, sorcière (1926)
- Vintras, hérésiarque et prophète (1928)
- Rosette Tamisier ou La miraculeuse aventure (1929)
- Trois histoires diaboliques (1930)
- Essai sur l’éloquence judiciaire (1931)
- La justice contemporaine, 1870-1932 (1933)
- La justice au Parnasse (1935)
- Magdeleine de la Croix, abbesse diabolique (1939)
- Huysmans inconnu, du bal du Château-rouge au monastère de Ligugé (1941)
- Le douanier Rousseau, accusé naïf (1941)
- Tableau de l’éloquence judiciaire (1943)
- L’Affaire Girard (1945)
- Sur les faits divers (1945)
- 13 drames du poison (1948)
- Plaidoyer pour René Hardy (1950)
- Procès sombres (1950)
- Louis XVII ou La Fausse énigme (1952)
- Sous le masque de Molière (1953)
- Plaidoyers chimériques (1954)
- La tumultueuse existence de Maubreuil, marquis d’Orvault (1954)
- Plaidoyer contre Naundorff (1955) (Advocacy Cons Naundorff
- Choses et autres (1956) (Things and Others)
- Histoire de la Justice sous la IIIe République (1957) (History of Justice Under the Third Republic)
- Défense de la liberté individuelle (1957) (Defence of Personal Liberty)
- Le journal d’un juge (1958) (Diary Of A Judge)
- Le costume des avocats (1958) (The Suit Lawyers)
- Histoires curieuses (1959) (Curious Histories)
- Plaidoyer contre la censure, Jean-Jacques Pauvert (1963) on the trial of the Sade
- L’Avocat et la morale (1963) (The Advocate and Morality)
- Nouvelles histoires curieuses (1964) (Curious News Histories)
- Lettre ouverte à la Justice (1966) (Open Letter To Justice)
- Le Palais et l’Académie (1966) (The Palace and the academy)
