= Devisenschutzkommando =

SS unit responsible for looting financial assets

- Active: 1940–45
- Country: Germany
- Branch: SS
- Type: Special looting unit

The Devisenschutzkommando (Foreign Exchange Protection Commando), or DSK, was a Nazi special looting unit of handpicked SS soldiers which operated in Belgium, France and the Netherlands and Czechoslovakia. The unit was established in 1940 and operated through the duration of World War II.

The DSK was nominally charged with overseeing all bank foreign exchange transactions in nations occupied by Nazi Germany, including monitoring bank deposits of currency, financial instruments, and precious metals. Quickly, however, the concept of 'foreign currency transactions' was broadly reinterpreted to mean anything of financial value. In practice, members of the DSK confiscated whatever they thought may be of worth.

Actions by the DSK included inspections of individual safe deposit boxes in the presence of the box holder, a bank employee, and a Nazi officer. Banknotes, stocks and bonds, gold and silver bullion, precious stones, and art objects found in the possession of general citizens were inventoried and placed in accounts controlled by German authorities. Jewish assets confiscated under various decrees were transferred to a German registered banking agent or the Vermögensverwaltungs und Rentenanstalt (Property Administrations and Pension Institute). Property issues were handled by Verwalter (special administrators). Lists of box holders who were overlooked during initial inspections, or who refused to cooperate, were required to be delivered to German inspectors. The sole mission of the DSK was to search and locate assets, not administer them.

Reports of violence and torture used in the process of locating and acquiring Jewish gold for the Nazis was widely reported. In France, the unit was led by Herbert Staffeldt and his deputy called Hartmann. The organization was supported by 'a small army' of low-level informers, tipsters, and collaborators known as Vertrauensmänner or "V-männer" (confidential agents). As the defeat of the German army by Allied forces became evident, actions taken by the DSK to confiscate anything of value to the Nazi state became brutal.
