= Alphonse Boudard =

French novelist and playwright

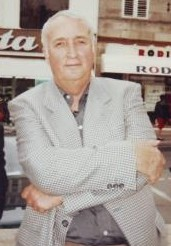

Alphonse Boudard (17 December 1925 – 14 January 2000) was a French novelist and playwright. He won the 1977 Prix Renaudot for Les Combattants du petit bonheur. Boudard's 1995 novel Dying childhood was awarded and recognised by the French Academy with a Grand Prix du roman de l'Académie française.

== Biography ==
Boudard was born on 17 December 1925 in the 13th arrondissement of Paris to a 17-year-old mother. He was brought up first by an adoptive family in the Loiret region of the centre of France, then by his grandmother in the south of Paris. Boudard had a late career. As a teenager, he was living in a country occupied by the German Army. He was wounded fighting for the French and he was awarded a military medal. His early adult life was spent in casual work, periods in jail and in a sanatorium recovering from tuberculosis. He experimented with writing, but it was not until he was 33 that he decided to be a full-time writer. He credited the writer Albert Paraz with inspiring this move.

His novels are characterised by the colloquial terms and slang that Boudard used to describe life in the 1940s. His works are autobiographical and he used his periods in a sanatorium and in jail as a basis for his stories. His 1963 novel The Cherry and his 1972 story The Hospital are examples, as is his 1992 novel The Amazing Mr Joseph which tells the story of a French spy who becomes a millionaire dealing on the black market during World War II (based on the real career of Joseph Joanovici).

Many of Boudard novels were adapted for French films and television.

Boudard had a wife and two sons. He died in Nice on 14 January 2000.
