= Nora Kiss =

Nora Kiss, birth name Eguine Eleonora Adamiantz, (1908–1993) was a Russian-born French ballerina and dance instructor. Together with her mother and her aunt, the dancer Rousanne Sarkissian, she fled the Russian Revolution and moved to Paris where she trained under Alexander Volinin. From 1938, she taught at the Studio Wacker dance school in Paris. She moved to Rome during World War II but returned to Paris thereafter. For many years, she spent two days a week teaching at the Théâtre de la Monnaie in Brussels. Recognized as one of the most competent dance instructors associated with the Studio Wacker, her students included Marcia Haydée and Maurice Béjart.

== Early life and education ==
Born in Pyatigorsk, Russia, on 16 June 1908, Eguine Eleonora Adamiantz was the daughter of the actress Tamira Adamiantz née Sarkissian and Choucha Adamiantz, an army officer. Both were of Armenian origin. Together with her mother and her aunt, the dance teacher Rousanne Sarkissian, they escaped the Russian Revolution and settled in Paris around 1918. She was trained principally by Alexander Volinin but also by Carlotta Brianza and Harald Lander.

== Career ==
Kiss started her career dancing with various companies, including the Ballets Russes directed by George Balanchine, visiting him in New York thereafter on several occasions. She is, however, remembered above all for her classes, especially those for stars from the Paris Opera Ballet. Her classes were also attended by other ballet dancers from Paris as well as by some from abroad.

Kiss was associated the French Resistance before World War II. In connection with those she met at social gatherings, she came in contact with US intelligence services. No doubt it was at their suggestion that she spent the war years in Rome where she gave ballet classes in a private studio.

Among her students were Maurice Béjart, Marcia Haydée, Mats Ek, Wilfride Piollet and Jean Guizerix, ballet stars from Japan, Italy and Portugal as well as quite a number from the Ballet of the 20th Century.

Her name came from that of her husband, the Hungarian painter who was actually called Ladislas Kish.

Nora Kiss died in Argenteuil on 3 December 1993, aged 85.
