= Rousanne Sarkissian =

Russian/French ballet teacher (1894–1958)

Madame Rousanne
- Born: Rousanne Sarkissian; 17 September 1894; Baku, Russian Empire
- Died: 17 March 1958 (aged 63); Paris, France
- Occupation: Ballet teacher

Rousanne Sarkissian (September 17, 1894 – March 17, 1958), also known as Madame Rousanne, was a dancer and teacher of ballet and neoclassical ballet. A renowned teacher, she trained many dancers and film stars at the Studio Wacker in Paris.

== Early life ==
Sarkissian was born in Baku in what is now Azerbaijan on 17 September 1894, although she had Armenian roots. She settled in Paris after fleeing the Russian Revolution together with her sister, Tamara, an actress and wife of the Russian musicologist of French origin Théodore d'Erlanger, and Tamara's daughter, the future ballet dancer Nora Kiss.

Sarkissian did not take up dancing until she arrived in Paris, having studied law in Moscow. In Paris she trained with Alexandre Volinine, Ivan Clustine and Vera Trefilova.

== Career ==
The dance studio, Studio Wacker, at 69 Rue de Douai in Paris, was established by the Russian ballerina and ballet instructor, Olga Preobrajenska, in 1923 and, in addition to being a school, became a popular meeting place for the international dance community, and a place for dancers looking for work and dance companies looking for dancers. Sarkissian joined as a teacher in 1928 and rapidly became a very popular instructor, known for her emphasis on the precision and speed of movements and the importance she attached to the quality of the musical accompaniment. She would stay there until her death in 1958.

Among those Sarkissian trained were Roland Petit, Maurice Béjart, Leslie Caron, Yvette Chauviré, Violette Verdy, Jean Babilée, Pierre Lacotte, Oleg Briansky, Brigitte Bardot, and Janet Sassoon. She was well paid by the Parisian elite to train their children and used this money to support her favourite students, particularly during the German occupation of Paris. She was especially fond of Maurice Béjart.

== Death ==
Sarkissian died on 17 March 1958. At her funeral the coffin was carried by Lacotte, Babilée, Béjart, and Boris Traïline. In 1978, Béjart created the autobiographical ballet Gaîté parisienne, using the music of Jacques Offenbach, in which the central character was Madame Rousanne, "ruthless, authoritarian, but capable of forgiving a talent for everything". The ballet ends with her death. Sarkissian also appears in other ballets created by Béjart.
