= Saint-Rambert =

Saint-Rambert is part of the name of several communes in France:

- Saint-Just-Saint-Rambert, in the Loire département
- Saint-Rambert-d'Albon, in the Drôme département
- Saint-Rambert-en-Bugey, in the Ain département
