= Paris in World War II =

Surrender of Paris

The city of Paris started mobilizing for war in September 1939, when Nazi Germany and the Soviet Union attacked Poland, but the war seemed far away until May 10 1940, when the Germans attacked France and quickly defeated the French Army. The French government departed Paris on June 10, and the Germans occupied the city on June 14. During the occupation, the French government moved to Vichy, and Paris was governed by both the German military, and French officials approved by the Germans. For Parisians, the occupation was a series of frustrations, shortages, and humiliations. A curfew was in effect from 9 p.m. to 5 a.m.; at night, the city went dark. Rationing of food, tobacco, coal and clothing was imposed from September 1940. Every year the supplies grew more scarce, while inflation increased the cost of buying them. A million Parisians left the city for the provinces, where there was more food and fewer Germans. The French press and radio contained only Nazi propaganda.

The Jews in Paris were forced to wear the yellow Star of David badge, and were barred from certain professions and public places. On July 16–17 1942, 13,152 Jews, including 4,115 children, were rounded up by the French police, on orders of the Germans, and were sent to the Auschwitz concentration camp. The first demonstration against the occupation, by Paris students, took place on 11 November 1940. As the war continued, anti-German clandestine groups and networks were created, some loyal to the French Communist Party (PCF), and others to General Charles de Gaulle in London. They wrote slogans on walls, organized an underground press, and sometimes attacked German officers. Reprisals by the Germans were swift and harsh.

Following the Allied invasion of Normandy on 6 June 1944, the French Resistance in Paris launched an uprising on 19 August, seizing the police headquarters and other government buildings. The city was liberated by French and American troops on 25 August; the next day, General De Gaulle led a triumphant parade down the Champs-Élysées and organized a new government. In the following months, 10,000 Parisians who had collaborated with the Germans were arrested and tried, 8,000 convicted, and 116 executed. On 29 April and 13 May 1945, the first municipal elections after the war and the first in which French women voted, were held.

== Capture ==
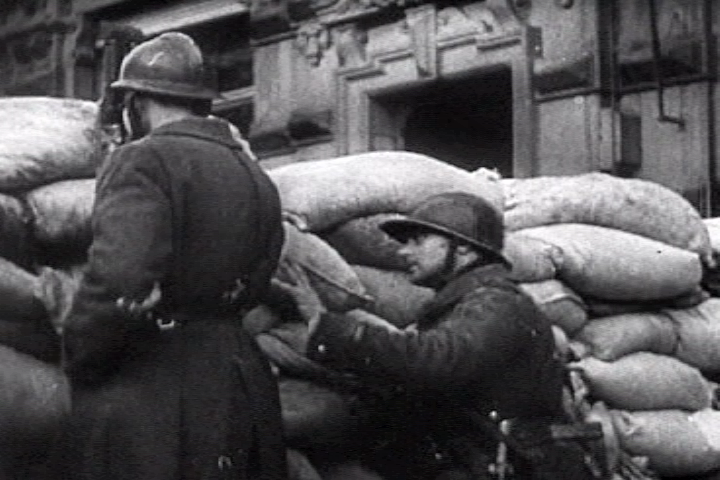
In 1940, the French army built barricades of sandbags on some Paris streets, but they were never used (Frank Capra's film Divide and Conquer, U.S. War Department)

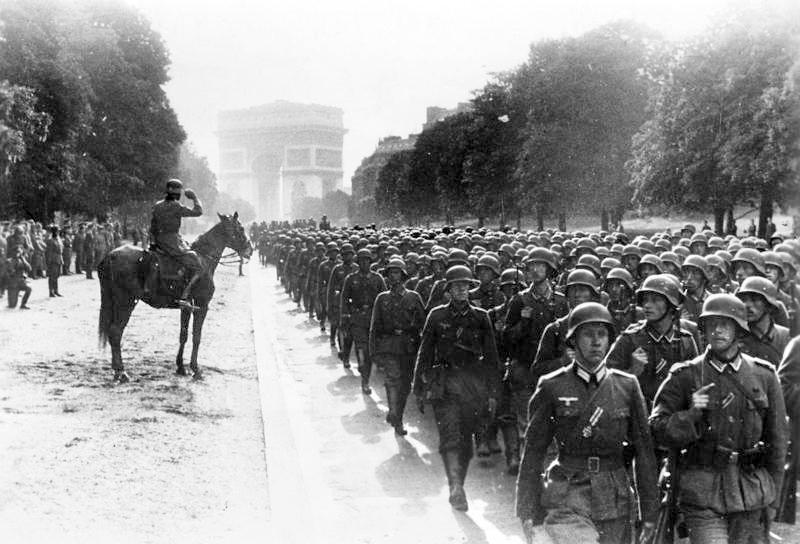
German soldiers of the 30th Infantry Division march on Avenue Foch on 14 June 1940 (Bundesarchiv)

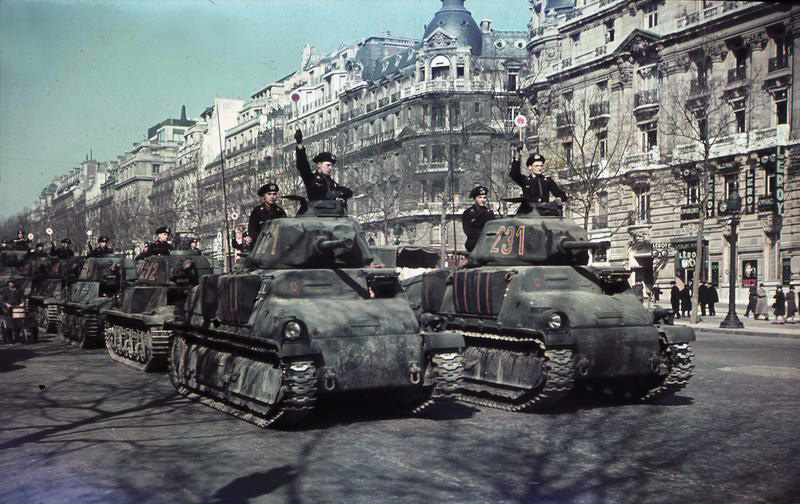
German army parade on Champs-Élysées in Paris, 1940. (Agfacolor)

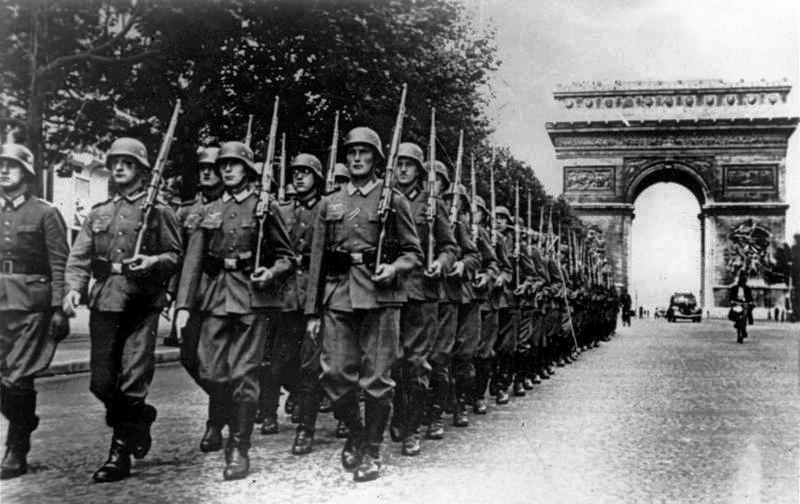
German soldiers parade on the Champs-Élysées on 14 June 1940 (Bundesarchiv)

=== Defense preparations ===
In the spring of 1939, war with Germany already seemed inevitable. In Paris, the first defense exercise took place on 2 February 1939. and city workers began digging 20 kilometers of trenches in city squares and parks to be used for bomb shelters. On 10 March, the city began to distribute gas masks to civilians, and on 19 March, signs were posted guiding Parisians to the nearest shelters. On 23 August, Parisians were surprised to read that the German foreign minister, Joachim von Ribbentrop, and Russian minister Vyacheslav Molotov had signed the Hitler–Stalin Pact of non-aggression. L'Humanité, the daily newspaper of the French Communist Party (PCF), welcomed the pact, writing: "At the moment when the Soviet Union makes a new and appreciable contribution to safeguard the peace, constantly threatened by the fascist instigators of war, the French Communist Party addresses its warmest greetings to the country of socialism, to its party and to its great leader Stalin". In Paris, the copies of the newspaper and of the other communist newspaper, Ce soir, were seized by the police and their publication suspended. On 31 August, anticipating bombardment, the French government began to evacuate 30,000 children out of the city to the countryside. That night, street lights were turned off as a measure against German air raids. On 1 September, news reached Paris that Germany had invaded Poland, and France, as expected, promptly declared war on Germany.

=== Safeguarding national treasures ===
On 27 August, in anticipation of air raids, workmen had begun taking down the stained glass windows of the Sainte-Chapelle. The same day, curators at the Louvre, summoned back from summer vacation, and aided by packers from the nearby La Samaritaine and Bazar de l'Hôtel de Ville department stores, began cataloging and packing the major works of art, which were put into crates and labeled only with numbers to disguise their contents. The Winged Victory of Samothrace statue was carefully wheeled down the long stairway on a wooden ramp, to be put on a truck for its departure to the Château de Valençay in the Indre department. Trucks used to move scenery for the Comédie-Française were used to move the larger paintings, including Géricault's Raft of the Medusa. The art works were carried in slow convoys of trucks, convoys, with headlights off to observe the blackout, to the châteaux of the Loire Valley and other designated locations.

The architectural landmarks of the city were protected by sandbags. The French Army waited in the fortifications of the Maginot Line, while in Paris, ration cards for gasoline were issued, restrictions were put on the sale of meat and, in February 1940, ration cards for food were issued; however, cafés and theatres remained open.

=== German invasion ===
The French defense plan was purely passive, waiting for the Germans to attack. After eight months of relative calm (known as the Phoney War, La drôle de guerre) on the Western Front, the Germans struck France on 10 May 1940, bypassing the Maginot Line and slipping through the Ardennes. By 15 May, German panzer divisions were only 35 kilometers from Laon, in the rear of the French and British armies, racing toward the English Channel. On 28 May, the British realized the battle was lost and began withdrawing their soldiers from the beaches of Dunkerque. Paris was soon flooded with refugees from the battle zone. On 3 June, the Germans bombed Paris and its suburbs for the first time, targeting in particular the Citroën automobile factory. 254 people were killed, including 195 civilians.

French Prime Minister Paul Reynaud dismissed his supreme military commander, Maurice Gamelin, and replaced him with the 73-year-old Maxime Weygand. He also named the 84-year-old Philippe Pétain, a hero of World War I, as deputy prime minister. Neither Weygand nor Pétain felt the Germans could be defeated, and they began looking for a way out of the war.

=== Evacuation ===
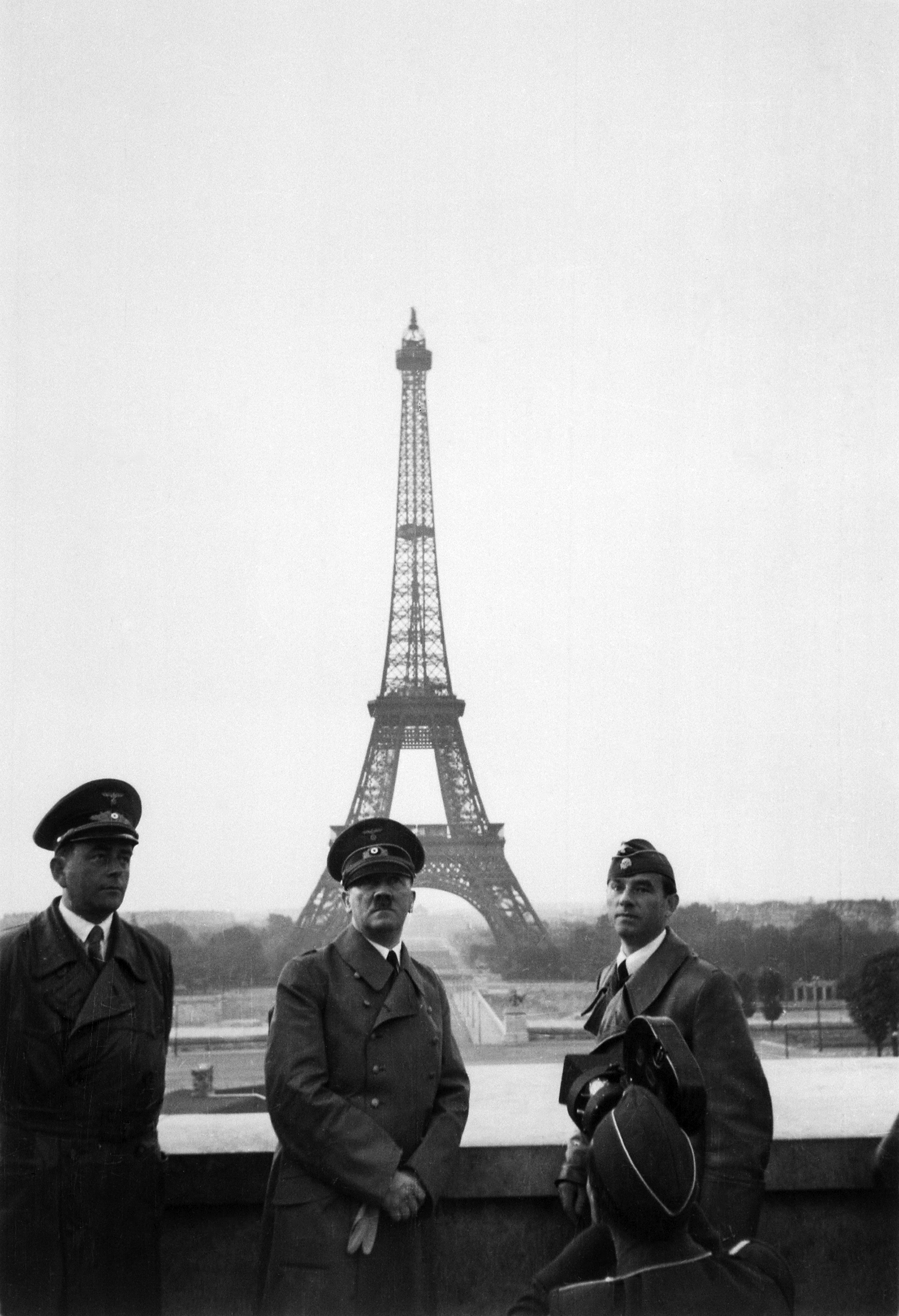
Adolf Hitler on the terrace of the Palais de Chaillot on 23 June 1940. To his left is the sculptor Arno Breker, to his right, Albert Speer, his architect (Bundesarchiv)

On 8 June, the sound of distant artillery fire could be heard in the capital. Trains filled with refugees departed Gare d'Austerlitz, with no announced destination. On 10 June, the French government fled Paris, first to Tours and then Bordeaux. Thousands of Parisians followed their example, filling the roads out of the city with automobiles, tourist buses, trucks, wagons, carts, bicycles, as well as fleeing on foot. The slow-moving river of refugees took ten hours to cover 30 kilometers. Within a few days, the wealthier arrondissements of the city were nearly deserted, and the population of the working-class 14th arrondissement dropped from 178,000 to 49,000.

=== Open city ===
The British General Staff urged the French to defend Paris street by street, but Pétain dismissed the idea: "To make Paris into a city of ruins will not affect the issue." On 12 June, the French government, in Tours, declared Paris to be an open city, in which there would be no resistance. At 5:30 a.m. of 14 June, the first German advance guard entered the city at Porte de La Villette and took the Rue de Flandres toward the center. They were followed by several German columns, which, following an established plan, moved to the principal intersections. German military vehicles with loudspeakers circulated, instructing Parisians not to leave their buildings. At 8 p.m., delegations of German officers arrived at Les Invalides, headquarters of the military governor of Paris, Henri Dentz, and at the Prefecture of Police, where the Prefect, Roger Langeron, was waiting. The Germans politely invited the French officials to put themselves at the disposition of the German occupiers. By the end of the afternoon, the Germans had hung a swastika flag at the Arc de Triomphe, and organized military parades with a marching band on the Champs-Élysées and Avenue Foch, primarily for the benefit of the German army photographers and newsreel cameramen.

=== Capitulation ===
On the evening of 16 June, Prime Minister Reynaud resigned. On the morning of 17 June, General De Gaulle left Bordeaux by plane for London. At midday, Parisians gathered around radios heard Pétain, the new head of the French government, announce: "It is with a heavy heart that I tell you today that we must cease hostilities. The fighting must stop." Though no armistice had yet been signed, the French army stopped fighting.

Adolf Hitler arrived on 24 June for a rapid tour by car, his only visit to Paris. He was guided by the German sculptor Arno Breker, and his chief architect, Albert Speer, both of whom had lived in Paris. He saw the Opera House, viewed the Eiffel Tower from the terrace of the Palace of Chaillot, paid homage at Napoleon's tomb, and visited the artist's quarter of Montmartre.

== German occupation ==
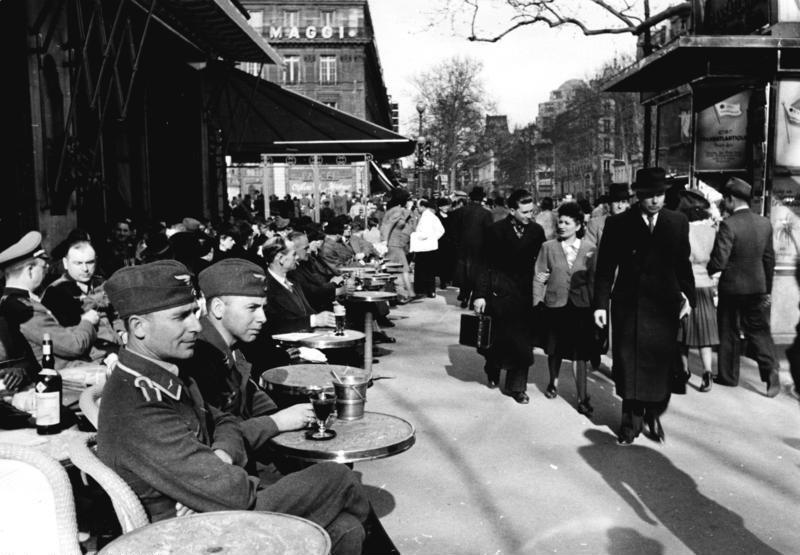
German Luftwaffe soldiers at a Paris café, 1941 (Bundesarchiv)

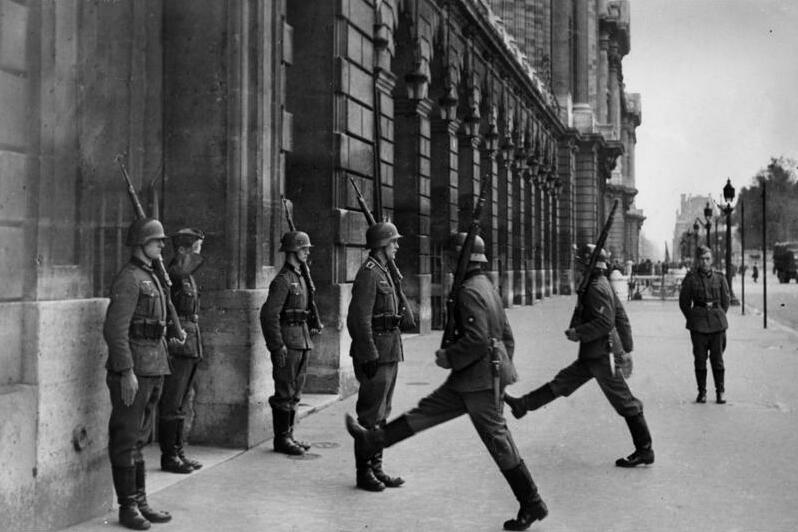
German soldiers goose stepping at changing of the guard at the Hôtel Crillon on the Place de la Concorde, October 1940 (Bundesarchiv)

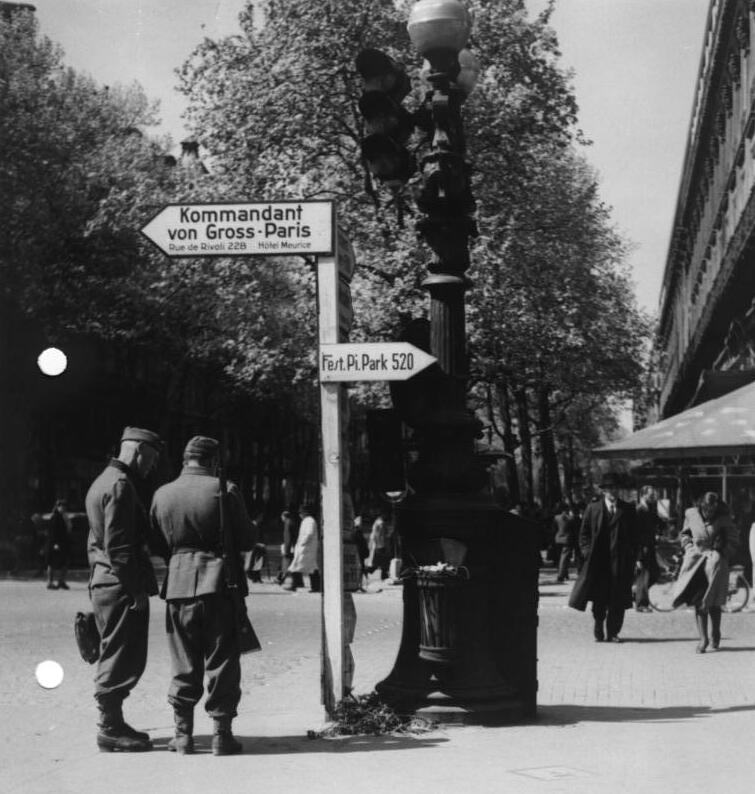
New signs show way to German headquarters of Greater Paris, 1940 (Bundesarchiv)

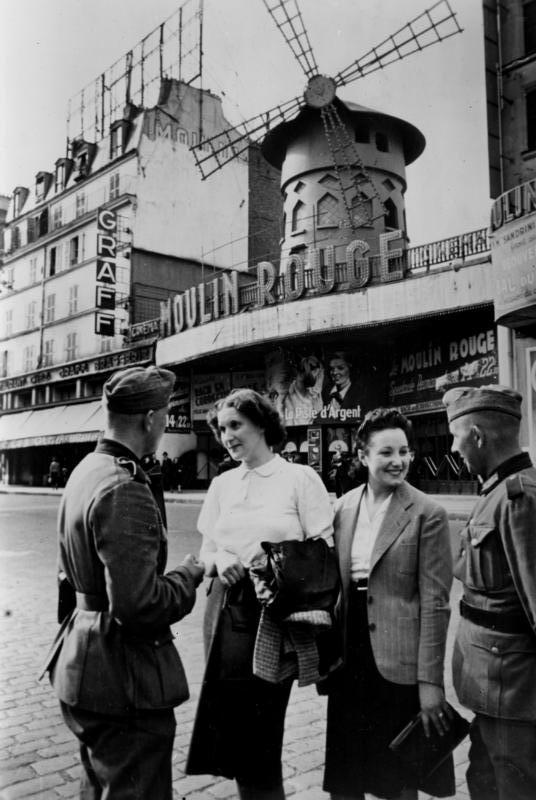
German soldiers in Montmartre at the Moulin Rouge (Bundesarchiv)

During the occupation, the French Government moved to Vichy, and the flag of Nazi Germany flew over all the French government buildings. Signs in German were placed on the main boulevards, and the clocks of all France were reset to the German time zone. The German military high command moved into the Majestic Hotel on Avenue Kléber; the Abwehr (German military intelligence), took over the Hôtel Lutetia; the Luftwaffe (German Air Force) occupied the Ritz; the Kriegsmarine (German Navy), the Hôtel de la Marine on the Place de la Concorde; the Carlingue, the French auxiliary organization of the Gestapo, occupied the building at 93 Rue Lauriston, and the German commandant of Paris and his staff moved into the Hôtel Meurice on Rue de Rivoli.

Paris became the primary destination for the rest and recreation of German soldiers. Under the slogan "Jeder einmal in Paris" ("everyone once in Paris"), each German soldier was promised one visit to Paris. One month after the beginning of the occupation, a bi-monthly magazine and guide for visiting German soldiers Der deutsche Wegleiter für Paris (The German Guide to Paris), was first published by the Paris Kommandantur. Certain hotels and movie theaters were reserved exclusively for German soldiers. A German-language newspaper, the Pariser Zeitung (1941–1944), was also published for the soldiers. The German officers enjoyed the Ritz, Maxim's, Coupole, and other exclusive restaurants, as the exchange rate was fixed to favor the German occupiers. Many houses of prostitution existed in Paris, and they began to cater to German clients.

The headquarters of the Sicherheitsdienst (SD), the counter-intelligence branch of the SS was at 84 Avenue Foch. French auxiliaries, who worked for the Gestapo, Sicherheitsdienst and Geheime Feldpolizei were based at 93 Rue Lauriston in the 16th arrondissement of Paris. They were known as the Carlingue (or French Gestapo) and were active between 1941 and 1944. The group was founded by Pierre Bonny, a corrupt ex-policeman. It was subsequently led by Henri Lafont and Pierre Loutrel, two professional criminals who had been active in the French underworld before the war.

== Life in occupied Paris ==
=== Civilian population ===
By the time that the Germans arrived in Paris, two-thirds of the Parisians, particularly those in the wealthier neighborhoods, had fled to the countryside and south of France, in what is known as The Exodus, the massive exodus of millions of people from the Netherlands, Belgium, Luxembourg, the north and east of France, fleeing after the German victory of the Battle of Sedan (12–15 May 1940). Once the occupation had begun, they started to return. By 7 July, the city government estimated the population had risen again to 1.5 million; it climbed to 2 million by 22 October, and 2.5 million by 1 January 1941. At the beginning of 1943, it fell again, because of air raids by the Allies, the arrests and deportations of Jews and foreigners, and forced departures to factories in Germany of many young Frenchmen, as part of the Service du travail obligatoire (STO), "Obligatory Work Service".

The attitude of the Parisians toward the occupiers varied greatly. Some saw the Germans as an easy source of money; others, as the Prefect of the Seine, Roger Langeron (arrested on 23 June 1940), commented, "looked at them as if they were invisible or transparent." The attitude of members of the French Communist Party was more complicated; the Party had long denounced Nazism and Fascism, but after the signing of the Molotov–Ribbentrop Pact on 23 August 1939, had to reverse direction. The editors of L'Humanité, which had been closed down by the French government, asked the Germans for permission to resume publishing, and it was granted. The Party also asked that workers resume work in the armaments factories, which were now producing for the Germans. Many individual communists opposed the Nazis, but the ambivalent official attitude of the Party lasted until Operation Barbarossa, the German attack on the Soviet Union on 22 June 1941. The Ukrainian-Jewish Marxist historian, Maximilien Rubel, was living semi-secretly in Paris, and was astonished by the level of ignorance shown by Marxist members of the resistance that he met, and in consequence, he introduced the term "Marxology" to refer to a systematic scholarly approach to the understanding of Marx and Marxism, which he perceived to be needed.

For the Parisians, the occupation was a series of frustrations, shortages and humiliations. A curfew was in effect from 9 p.m. to 5 a.m.; at night, the city went dark. Rationing of food, tobacco, coal and clothing was initiated in September 1940. Every year, supplies grew more scarce, and prices higher. The French press and radio broadcast only German propaganda.

The beginning of the STO, the program that required large number of young Frenchmen to work in factories for the German war industry, in exchange for the return of older and sick French prisoners of war in Germany, greatly increased the resentment of the French population against the Germans. Most Parisians, however, only expressed their anger and frustrations in private, while the police of Paris, under German control, every day, received hundreds of anonymous denunciations by Parisians against other Parisians.

=== Rationing and the black market ===
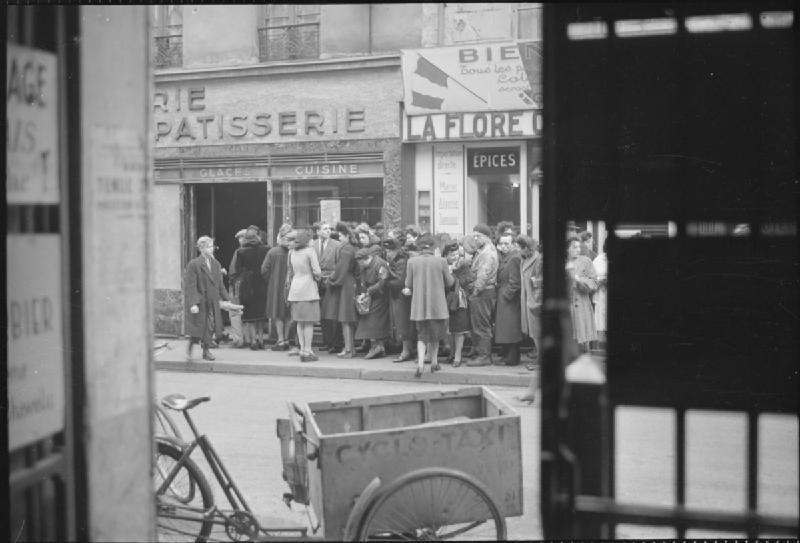
Line outside a Paris bakery in spring 1945. The liberation did not end the food shortages.

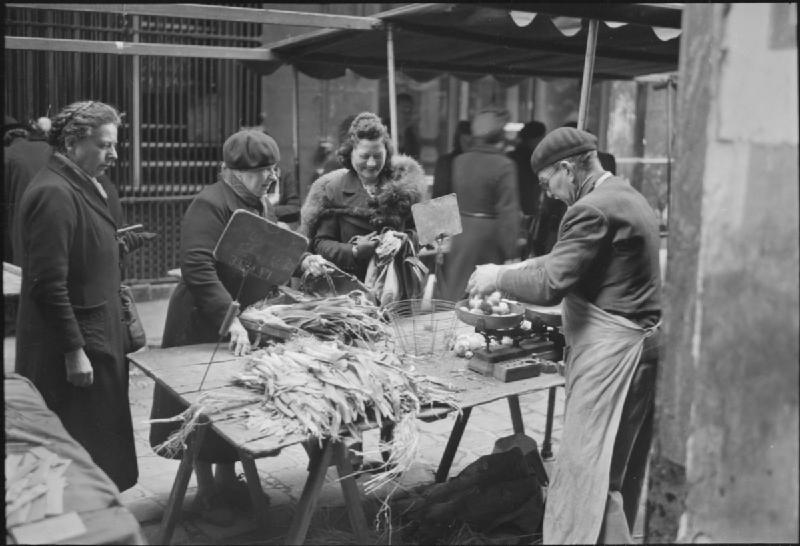
Potatoes and leeks on sale in a Paris market. There was little else to buy. Spring 1945

Finding food soon became the first preoccupation of the Parisians. The authorities of the German occupation transformed French industry and agriculture into a machine for serving Germany. Shipments to Germany had first priority; what was left went to Paris and the rest of France. All of the trucks manufactured at the Citroen factory went directly to Germany. (Later many of these trucks were cleverly sabotaged by the French workers, who recalibrated the dip sticks so that the trucks would run out of oil without warning). Most shipments of meat, wheat, milk produce and other agricultural products also went to Germany. What remained for the Parisians was strictly rationed, following the creation on 16 June 1940 of the Ministère de l'agriculture et du ravitaillement (Ministry of Agriculture and Supply), which began to impose a system of rationing as early as 2 August 1940, as per Décret du 30 juillet 1940: bread, fat, flour products, rice, sugar; then, on 23 October 1940: butter, cheese, meat, coffee, charcuterie, eggs, oil; in July 1941: and as the war went on: chocolate, fish, dried vegetables, (like peas and beans), potatoes, fresh vegetables, wine, tobacco... Products could be bought only upon presentation of coupons attributed to specific items and on the specific week in which they could be used. Parisians (and all the population of France) were divided into seven categories depending upon their age, and allotted a certain amount of each product each month. A new bureaucracy, employing more than 9,000 city employees, with offices at all schools and the city hall of each arrondissement, was put into place to administer the program. The system resulted in long lines and frustrated hopes, since promised products often never appeared. Thousands of Parisians regularly made the long journey by bicycle to the countryside, hoping to come back with vegetables, fruit, eggs and other farm products.

The rationing system also applied to clothing: leather was reserved exclusively for German army boots, and vanished completely from the market. Leather shoes were replaced by shoes made of rubber or canvas (raffia) with wooden soles. A variety of ersatz or substitute products appeared, which were not exactly what they were called: ersatz wine, coffee (made with chicory), tobacco and soap.

Finding coal for heat in winter was another preoccupation. The Germans had transferred the authority over the coal mines of northern France from Paris to their military headquarters in Brussels. The priority for the coal that did arrive in Paris was for use in factories. Even with ration cards, adequate coal for heating was almost impossible to find. Supplies for normal heating needs were not restored until 1949.

Paris restaurants were open, but had to deal with strict regulations and shortages. Meat could only be served on certain days, and certain products, such as cream, coffee, and fresh produce were extremely rare. Nonetheless, the restaurants found ways to serve their regular clients. The historian René Héron de Villefosse, who lived in Paris throughout the war, described his experience: "The great restaurants were only allowed to serve, under the fierce eye of a frequent control, noodles with water, turnips and beets, in exchange for certain number of tickets, but the hunt for a good meal continued for many food-lovers. For 500 F one could conquer a good pork chop, hidden under cabbage and served without the necessary tickets, along with a liter of Beaujolais and a real coffee; sometimes it was on the first floor at rue Dauphine, where you could listen to the BBC while sitting next to Picasso."

The restrictions and shortage of goods led to the existence of a thriving black market. Producers and distributors of food and other scarce products set aside a portion of their goods for the black market, and used middle-men to sell them to customers. The bars of the Champs-Élysées, and other parts of Paris, became common meeting places between the middle-men and clients. Parisians bought cigarettes, meat, coffee, wine and other products which frequently neither the middle-man nor customer had ever seen.

=== Transport ===
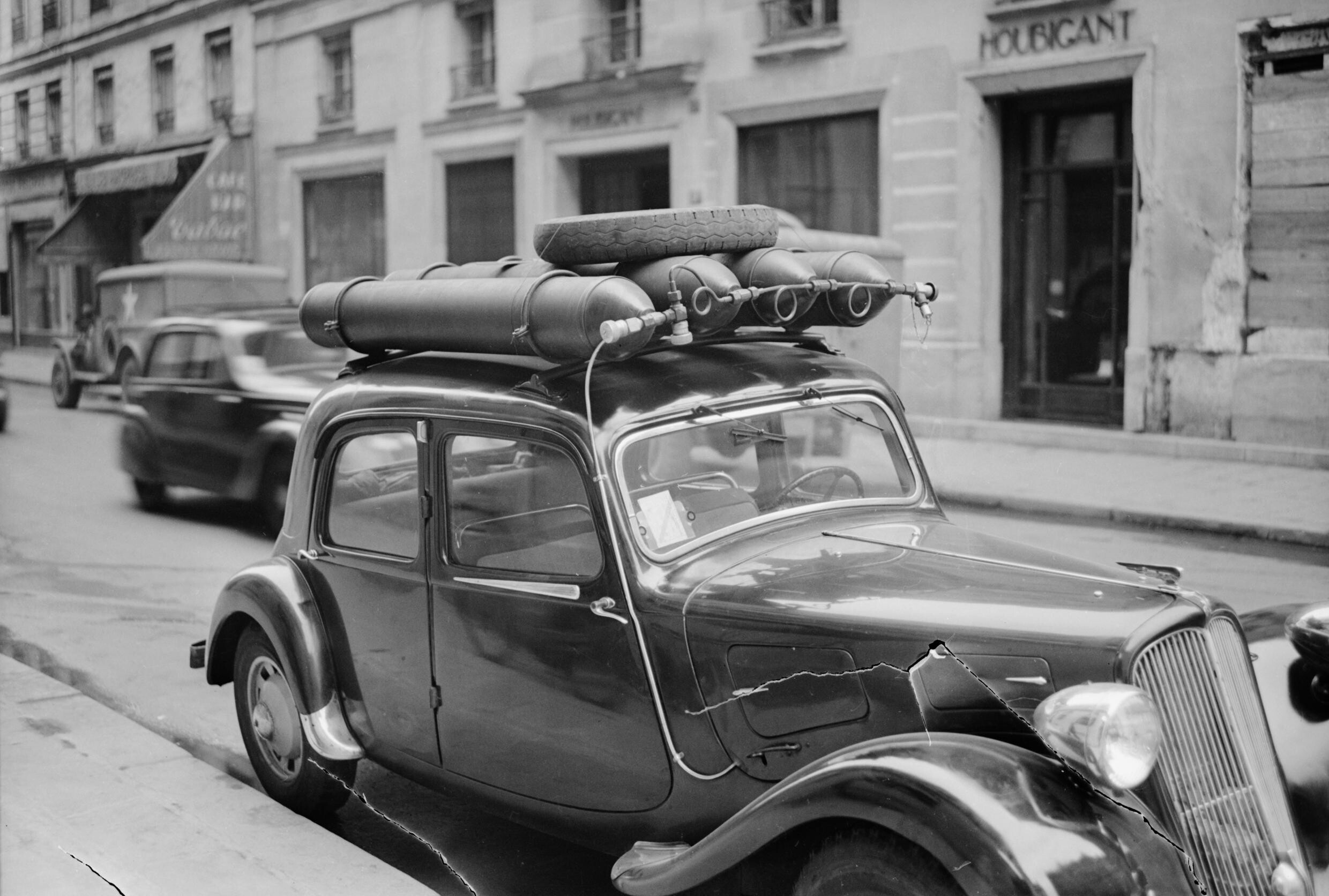
A car converted to run on coal gas instead of gasoline (1945) (Imperial War Museums, U.K.)

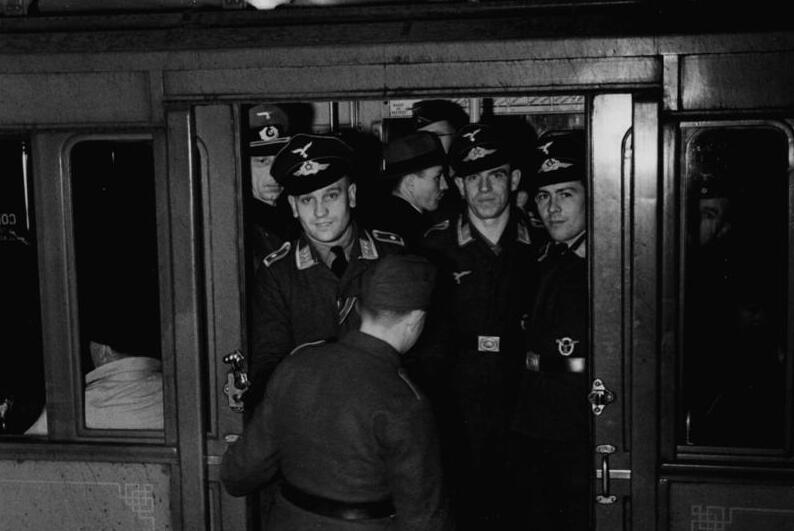
Luftwaffe officers on the Metro (Bundesarchiv)

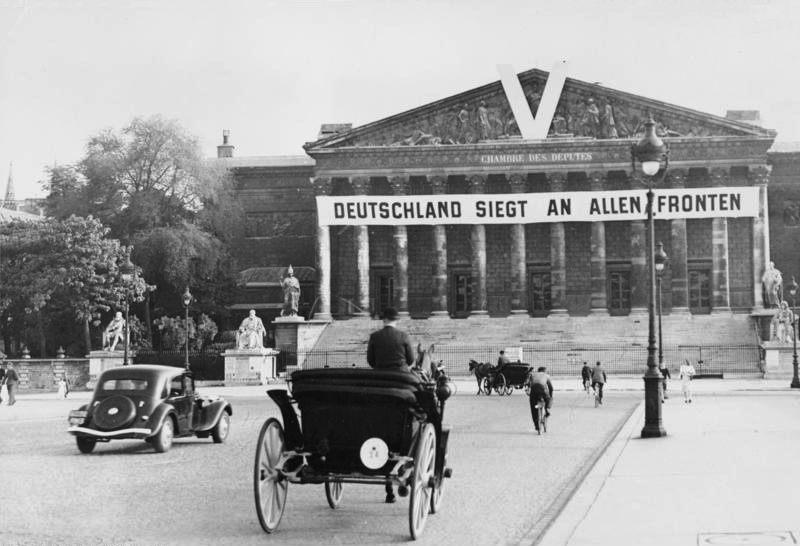
Horse-drawn coaches in front of the National Assembly, decorated with slogan: "Germany is winning on all fronts" (Bundesarchiv)

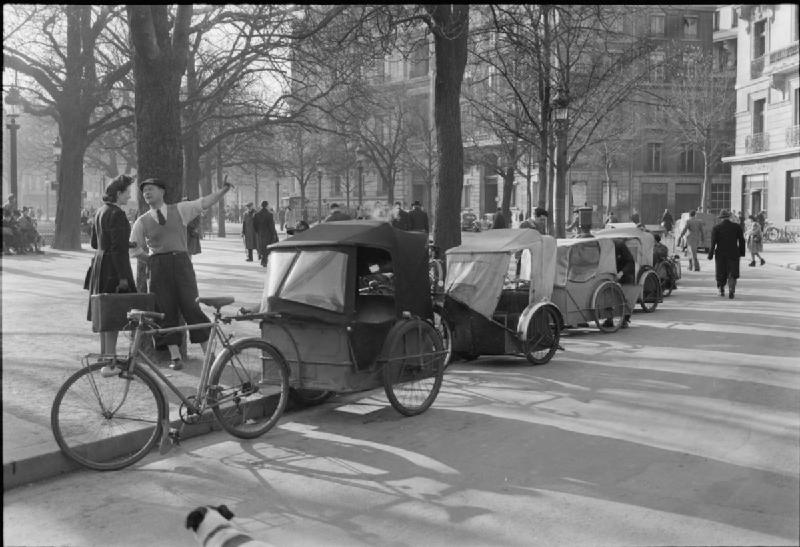
The pedicab, or cycle rickshaw, was still in use in the spring of 1945 (Imperial War Museums, U.K.)

Due to the shortage of fuel, the number of automobiles on the Paris streets dropped from 350,000 before the war to just under 4,500. One customer, sitting on the terrace of a café on the Place de la Bourse, counted the number of cars which passed between noon and 12:30 p.m.: only three came by. Older means of transportation, such as the horse-drawn fiacre came back into service. Trucks and automobiles that did circulate often used gazogene, a poor-quality fuel carried in a tank on the roof, coal gas, or methane, all extracted from the Paris sewers.

The metro ran, but service was frequently interrupted and the cars were overcrowded. Some 3,500 buses had run on the Paris streets in 1939, but only 500 were still running in the autumn of 1940. Bicycle-taxis became popular, and their drivers charged high tariffs. Bicycles became the means of transport for many Parisians, and their prices soared; a used bicycle cost a month's salary.

Transportation problems did not end with the liberation of Paris; the shortage of gasoline and lack of transport continued until well after the war.

=== Culture and the arts ===
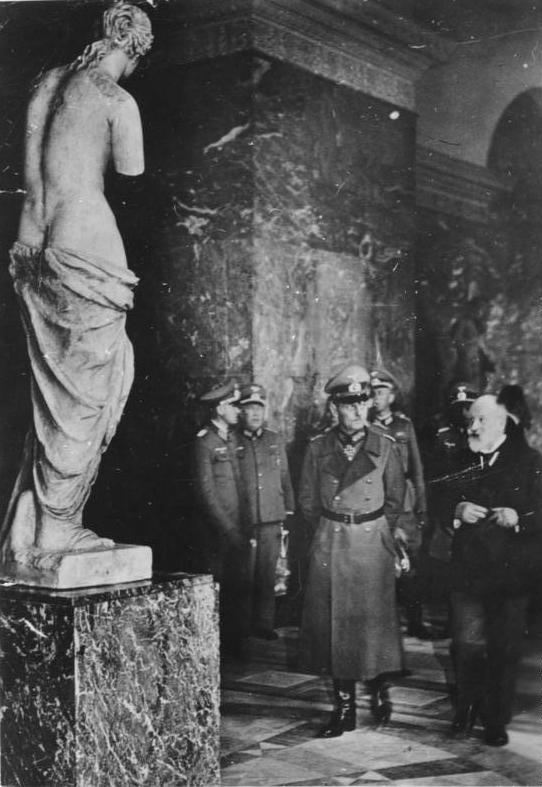
German field marshal Gerd von Rundstedt is given a tour of the Louvre, 10 October 1940 (Bundesarchiv)

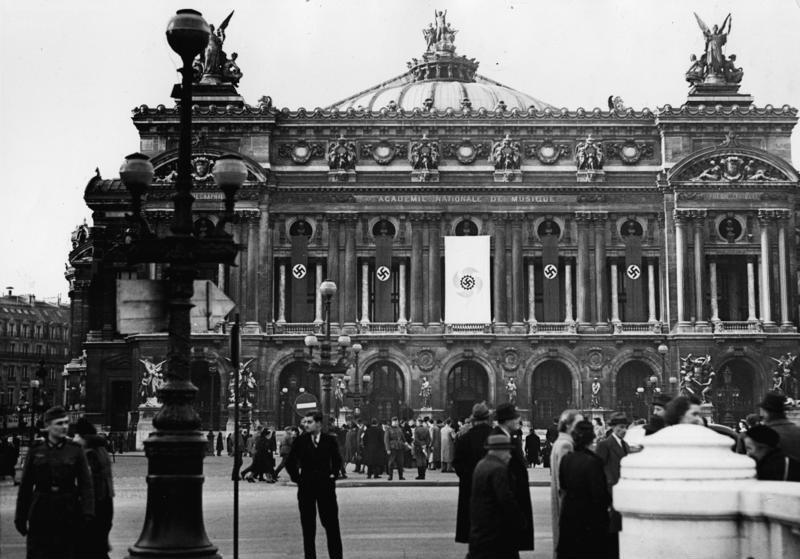
The Paris Opera decorated with swastikas for a festival of German music, 1941 (Bundesarchiv)

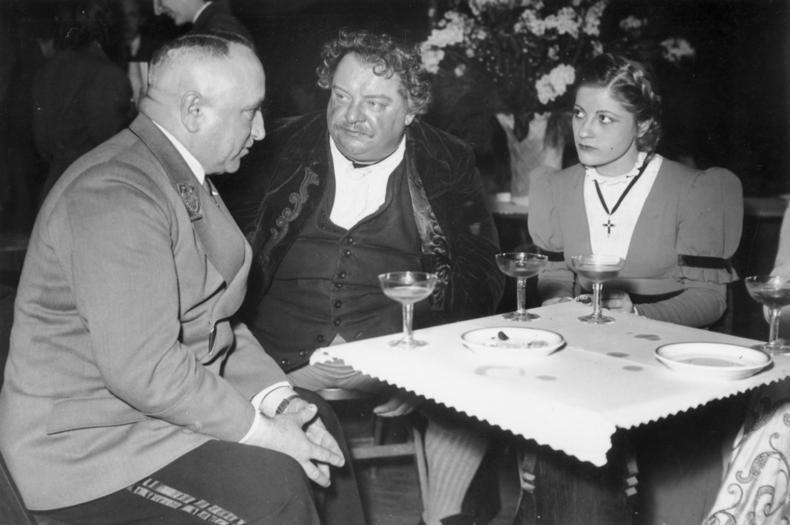
After a performance of Schiller's Intrigue and Love at the Théâtre des Champs-Élysées in 1941, from left to right: Dr. Ley, Reich organization leader; Heinrich George, Schiller Theater Intendant; and German actress Gisela Uhlen (Bundesarchiv)

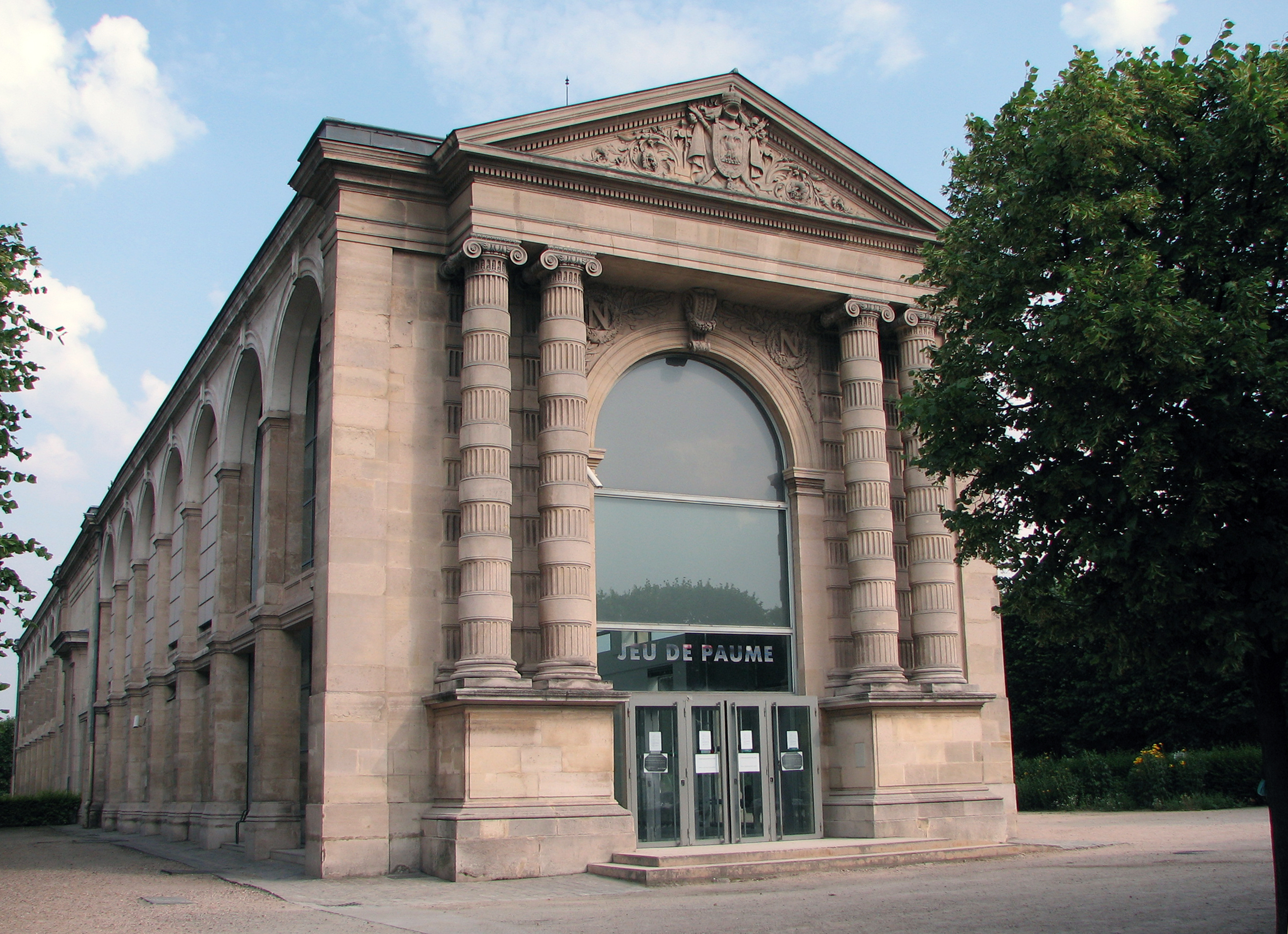
The Galerie nationale du Jeu de Paume became a storehouse for art stolen from Jewish families (TCY, 2007)

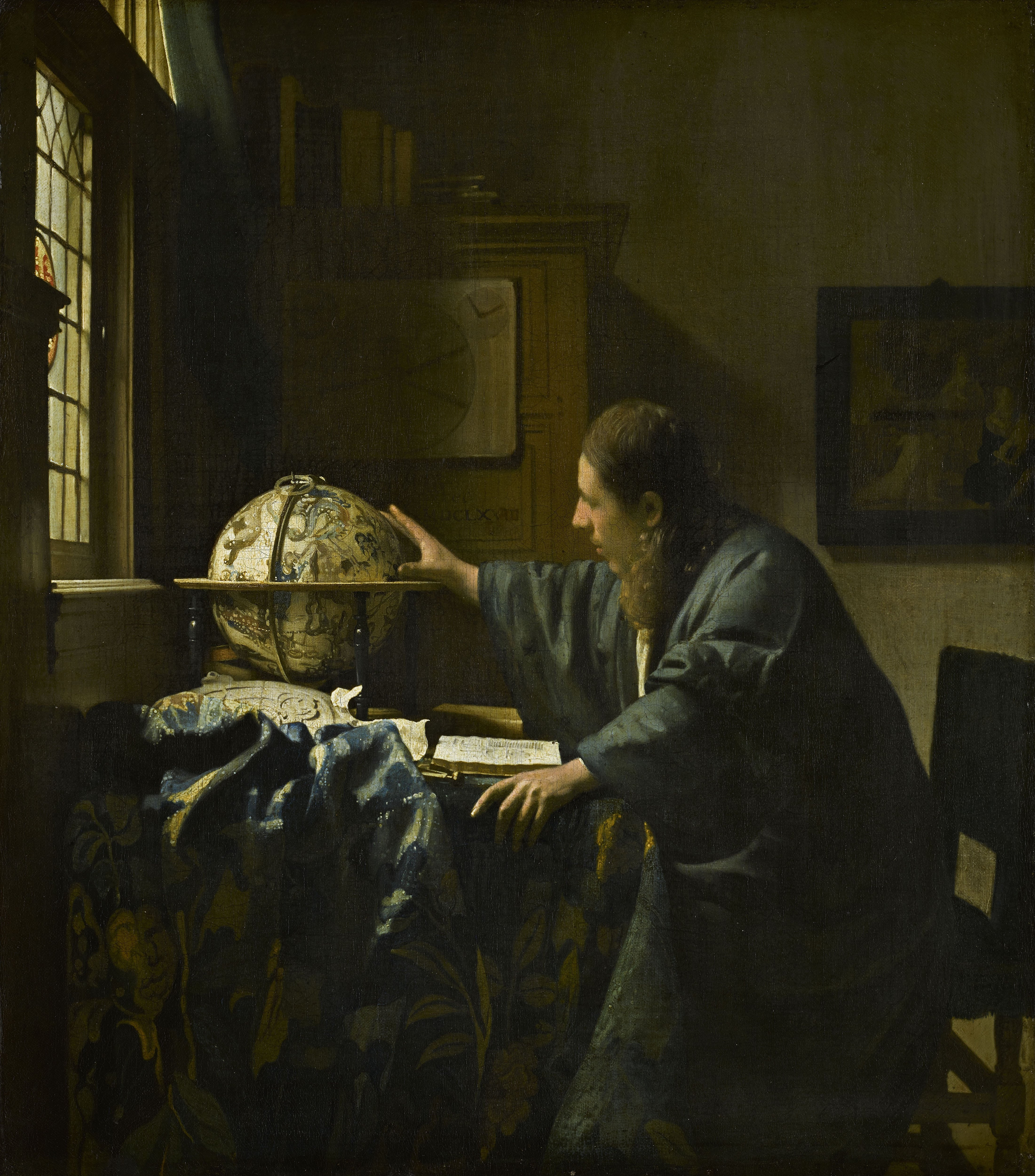
Vermeer's 1668 painting The Astronomer was stolen from the Rothschild family by the Nazis and given to Adolf Hitler

One of the greatest art thefts in history took place in Paris during the occupation, as the Nazis looted the art of Jewish collectors on a grand scale. Great masterpieces in the Louvre had already been evacuated to the châteaux of the Loire Valley and the unoccupied zone, and were safe. The German Army was respectful of the Hague Conventions of 1899 and 1907, and refused to transfer the works in French museums out of the country, but the Nazi leaders were not so scrupulous. On 30 June 1940, Hitler ordered that all art works in France, public and private, should be "safeguarded". Many of the French wealthy Jewish families had sent their art works out of France before leaving the country, but others had left their art collections behind. A new law decreed that those who had left France just before the war were no longer French citizens, and their property could be seized. The Gestapo began visiting bank vaults and empty residences, and collecting the works of art. The pieces left behind in the fifteen largest Jewish-owned art galleries in Paris were also collected, and transported in French police vans. In September, a new organization, the Reichsleiter Rosenberg Taskforce (Einsatzstab Reichsleiter Rosenberg) was created to catalog and store the art. It was moved to the Galerie nationale du Jeu de Paume, a building in the Tuileries Gardens used by the Louvre for temporary exhibits. More than 400 crates of art works were brought to the Jeu de Paume by Luftwaffe personnel, unpacked and cataloged. Hermann Göring, the head of the Luftwaffe, visited the Jeu de Paume on 3 November and returned two days later, spending the entire day there picking out works for his private collection. He selected 27 paintings, including works by Rembrandt and Van Dyck owned by Edouard de Rothschild, as well as stained glass windows and furniture intended for Carinhall, the luxurious hunting lodge he had built in the Schorfheide Forest in Germany. Another Rothschild-owned painting, The Astronomer by Vermeer, was reserved for Hitler himself. Fifteen railroad boxcars full of artworks were sent to Germany with Göring's personal train. Göring visited the Jeu de Paume 12 more times in 1941, and five times in 1942, adding to his collection.

Confiscations continued at banks, warehouses and private residences, with paintings, furniture, statues, clocks and jewelry accumulating at the Jeu de Paume, and filling the whole ground floor. The staff at the Jeu de Paume cataloged 218 major collections. Between April 1941 and July 1944, 4,174 cases of art works filling 138 boxcars, were shipped from Paris to Germany. Much of the art, but not all, was recovered after the war.

=== Arts ===
While some painters left Paris, many remained and continued working. Georges Braque returned to Paris in autumn 1940, and quietly continued working. Pablo Picasso spent most of 1939 in a villa in Royan, north of Bordeaux. He returned to Paris and resumed working in his studio on Rue des Grands-Augustins. He frequently received visitors at his studio, including Germans, some admiring, but others suspicious. He had postcards made of his famous anti-fascist work, Guernica, to hand out as souvenirs to visitors, and had serious discussions of art and politics with visiting Germans, including writer Ernst Jünger. While his work was officially condemned as "degenerate", his paintings continued to be sold at the Hôtel Drouot auction house and Galerie Louise Leiris, formerly Daniel-Henry Kahnweiler's. German treasurer officials opened Picasso's bank vault, where he stored his private art collection, searching for Jewish-owned art they could seize. Picasso so confused them with his descriptions of ownership of the paintings, that they left without taking anything. He also persuaded them that the paintings in the adjoining vault, owned by Braque, were actually his own. Other "degenerate" artists, including Kandinsky and Henri Matisse, who sent drawings up to Paris from his residence in Nice, were officially condemned, but continued to sell their works in the back rooms of Paris galleries.

A few actors, such as Jean Gabin and film director Jean Renoir, chose, for political or personal reasons, to leave Paris, but many others remained, avoided politics, and focused on their art. These included the actor Fernandel, film director and playwright Sacha Guitry, and singers Édith Piaf, Tino Rossi, Charles Trenet, and Yves Montand. The jazz musician Django Reinhardt played with the Quintette du Hot Club de France for both German and French fans. In 1941, Maurice Chevalier performed a new revue in the Casino de Paris: Bonjour Paris. The songs "Ça sent si bon la France" and "La Chanson du maçon" became hits. The Nazis asked Chevalier to perform in Berlin, and sing for Radio Paris. He refused, but did perform for French prisoners of war in Germany, and succeeded in obtaining the liberation of ten prisoners in exchange.

The writer Colette, who was 67 when the war began, worked quietly on her mémoires in her apartment at 9 rue du Beaujolais, next to the gardens of the Palais-Royal. Her husband, Maurice Goudeket, a Jew, was arrested by the Gestapo in December 1941, and although he was released after a few months through the intervention of the French wife of the German ambassador Otto Abetz, Colette lived through the rest of the war years with the anxiety of a possible second arrest. In 1944, she published one of her most famous works, Gigi.

The philosopher and novelist Jean-Paul Sartre continued to write and publish; Simone de Beauvoir produced a broadcast on the history of the music hall for Radio Paris, and Marguerite Duras worked at a publishing house. The actress Danielle Darrieux made a tour to Berlin, in exchange for the liberation of her husband, Porfirio Rubirosa, a Dominican diplomat suspected of espionage. The actress Arletty, the star of Les Enfants du paradis ("Children of Paradise") and Hôtel du Nord, had a relationship with Hans Jürgen Soehring, a Luftwaffe officer, and gave the famous riposte to a member of the Forces françaises de l'Intérieur (FFI) interrogating her after the Liberation: "My heart is French, but my a-- is international."

Jewish actors were not allowed to perform.

Some places in Paris were frequented by homosexual actors and artists, notably the swimming pool in the Bois de Boulogne. The actor Jean Marais was officially harassed for his homosexuality, and actor Robert-Hugues Lambert was arrested and deported, most likely because of his relationship with a German officer whom he did not want to name. He was murdered at the Flossenbürg concentration camp on 7 March 1945.

The Germans made a continual effort to seduce the Parisians through culture: in 1941, they organized a festival of German music by the Berlin Philharmonic at the Paris Opera, a play from the Schiller Theater in Berlin at the Théâtre des Champs-Élysées, and an exhibit by the German sculptor Arno Breker.

The French film industry, based in suburbs of Paris, had a very difficult existence, due to shortages of personnel, film and food, but it produced several genuine masterpieces, among which: Marcel Carné's Les Enfants du paradis, which was filmed during the occupation, but not released until 1945.

== Antisemitism ==
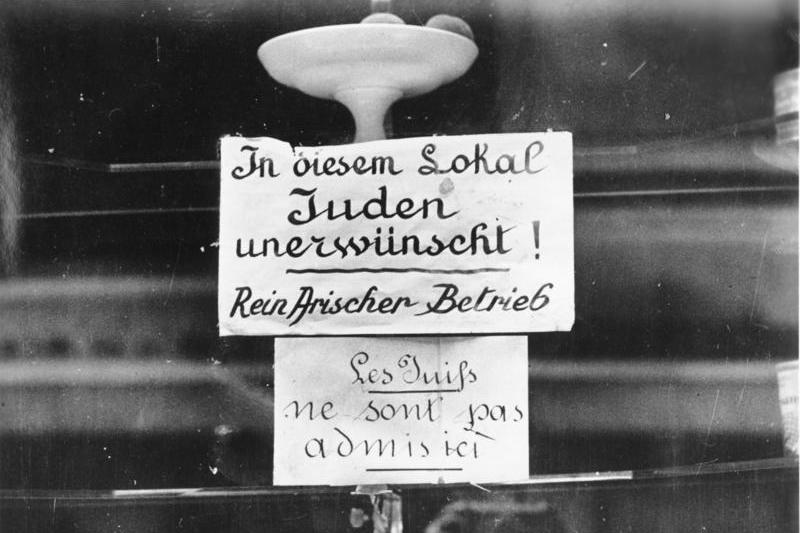
A German sign outside a Paris restaurant announces that Jews are not admitted (Bundesarchiv, 1 September 1940)

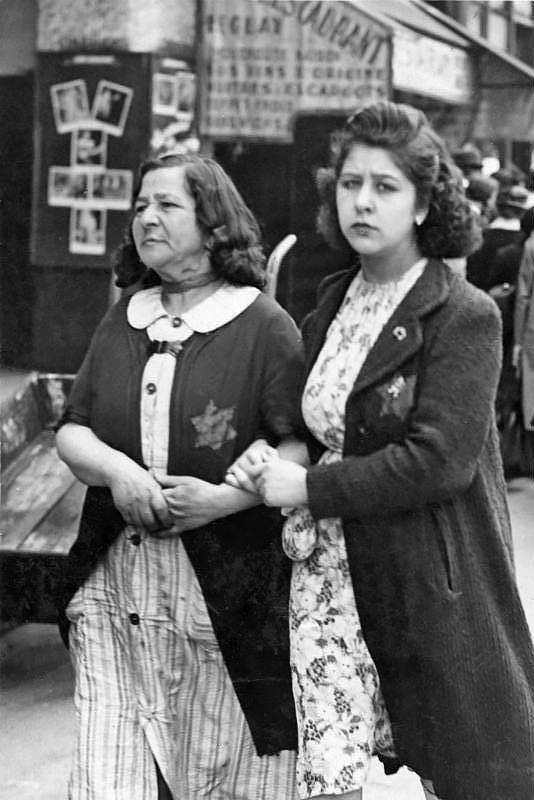
Jewish women were required to wear a yellow Star of David (Bundesarchiv, 1 June 1942)

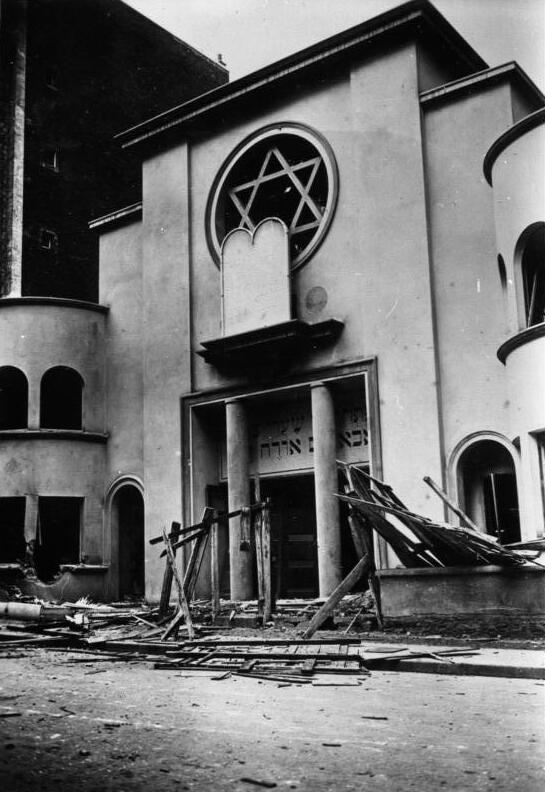
The Synagogue of Montmartre and several others were attacked and vandalized in 1941.(Bundesarchiv)

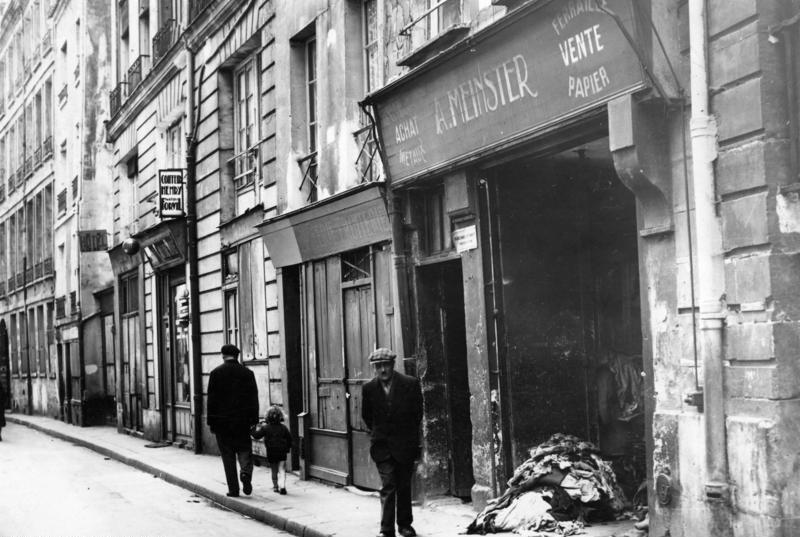
A Jewish-owned shop in the Marais, wrecked in May 1941 (Bundesarchiv)

From the very beginning of the occupation, Jews in Paris were treated with particular harshness. On 18 October 1940, the German occupation authorities decreed, in what is known as the Ordonnance d'aryanisation, that Jews would have a special status, and be barred from liberal professions, such as commerce and industry, thus affecting lawyers, doctors, professors, shop owners, also getting barred from certain restaurants and public places, and their property was seized. On 23 May 1942, the head of the Anti-Jewish section of the Gestapo, Adolf Eichmann, gave secret orders for the deportation of French Jews to the concentration camp of Auschwitz. On 29 May, all Jews in the occupied zone over the age of six were required to wear the yellow Star of David badge. In July, Jews were banned from all main streets, movie theaters, libraries, parks, gardens, restaurants, cafés, and other public places, and were required to ride in the last car of metro trains. On 16–17 July 1942, on Germans' orders, 13,152 Jews (4,115 children, 5,919 women and 3,118 men) were rounded up by the French police. Unmarried persons and couples without children were taken to Drancy, some 20 kilometers north of Paris, while 8,160 men, women and children comprising families went to the Vélodrome d'Hiver ("Vel' d'Hiv' ") stadium, on Rue Nelaton in the 15th arrondissement, where they were crowded together in the heat of summer, with hardly any food, water and no hygienic facilities for five days before being sent to Drancy, Compiègne, Pithiviers and Beaune-la-Rolande internment camps, preludes to the Auschwitz extermination camp. The roundup was considered a failure by the Germans, since they had prepared trains for 32,000 persons. Arrests continued in 1943 and 1944. By the time of the Liberation, it was estimated that 43,000 Jews from the Paris region, or about half the total population of the community, had been sent to the concentration camps, and 34,000 were murdered there.

== Collaboration ==
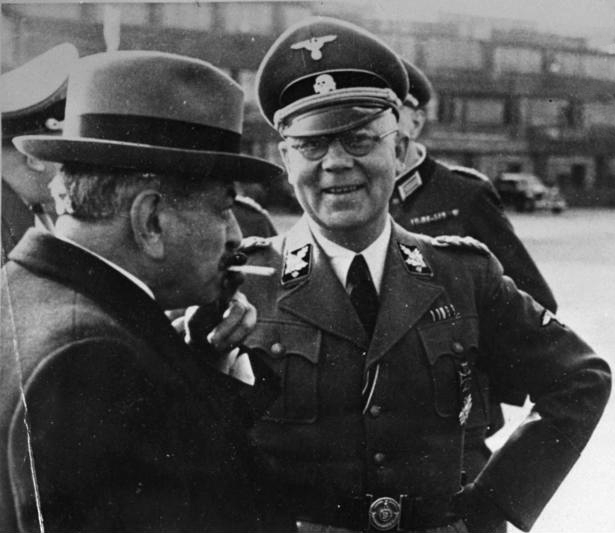
French Premier Pierre Laval and General Carl Oberg, the German police commander in Paris, responsible for the Gestapo and SS, 1 May 1943 (Bundesarchiv)

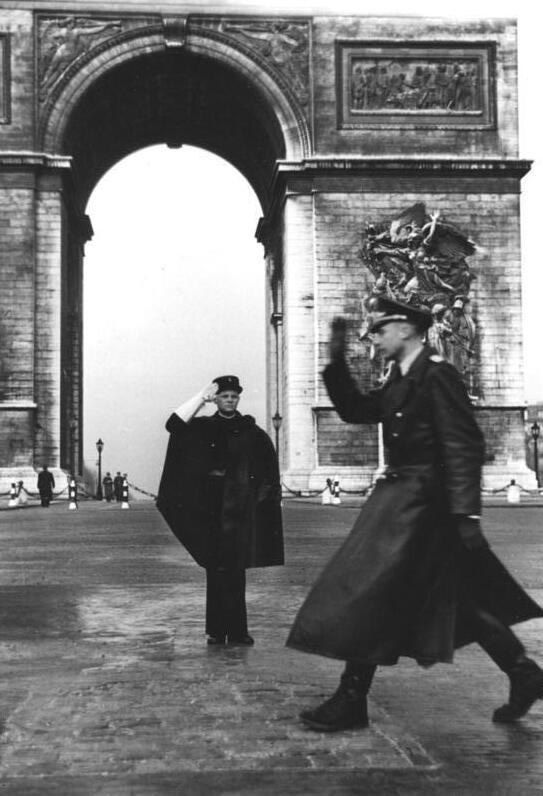
A Paris policeman salutes a German officer (Bundesarchiv, 1941)

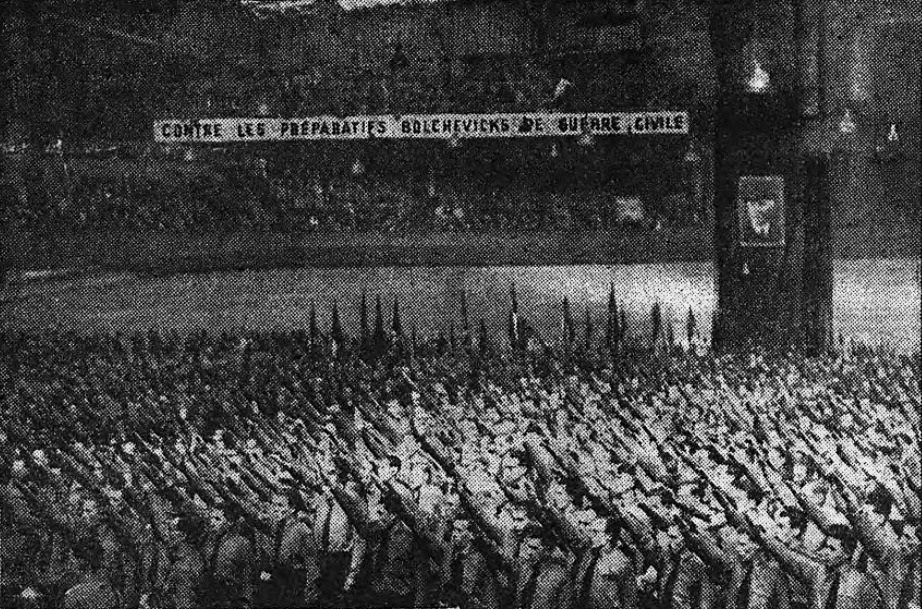
11 April 1943: Meeting at the Vel' d'Hiv' in Paris of the Front révolutionnaire national, a French fascist paramilitary organization created on 28 February 1943 to fight the French Resistance. Its active collaborationist police was known as the Milice, whose members, above, swear allegiance to the organization. (Photo: Le Matin newspaper, 12 April 1943)

Many Parisians collaborated with the Government of Marshal Pétain and the Germans, assisting them with city administration, the police, and other government functions. French government officials were given the choice of collaborating or losing their jobs. On 2 September 1941, all Paris magistrates were asked to take an oath of allegiance to Marshal Petain. Only one, Paul Didier, refused. Unlike the territory of Vichy France, governed by Marshal Pétain and his ministers, the document of surrender placed Paris in the occupied zone, directly under German authority, the Militärbefehlshabers in Frankreich (MBF). It stated: "The government of France will immediately invite all the French authorities and administrative services in the occupied territories to conform with the regulations of the German military authorities, and to collaborate with those in a correct manner." The prefect of the police and prefect of the Seine, reported to him, and only secondarily to the government of the French State in Vichy.

The Reich Security Main Office (Reichssicherheitshauptamt, RHSA), which oversaw the SS, SD and the Gestapo, worked closely with the French police and its auxiliaries. It established the Carlingue (or French Gestapo) which was used to conduct counter-insurgency operations against the Resistance. Its cadre, which was mostly from the French underworld, operated from 93 Rue Lauriston. Many of its members were captured at the end of the war and executed. The Nazi security agencies also established Special Brigades under the Prefecture of Police in Paris, these units operated in accordance with the RHSA and the SS capturing resistance fighters and Allied agents, as well as rounding up Jews for deportation. Prisoners were routinely tortured by the Special Brigades.

The Germans supported the creation by Vichy France, on 28 February 1943, of a fascist paramilitary organization, the Front révolutionnaire national, whose active police branch was called Milice. Its particular function was to help the Germans in their battle against the Resistance, which they qualified as being a "terrorist" organization. It established its headquarters in the former Communist Party building at 44 Rue Le Peletier, and 61 Rue de Monceau. The Lycée Louis-Le-Grand was occupied as barracks, and an officer candidate school was established in the Auteuil synagogue. The Front révolutionnaire national held a large rally on 11 April 1943 at the Vél' d'Hiv'. At the time of the Liberation of Paris in August 1944, most of its members chose to fight alongside the Germans and many of them made their way to Germany (Sigmaringen) when Paris fell to the Allies. Those who did not leave were the target of the purge (épuration legale) that followed.

== Crime ==
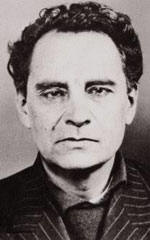
Doctor Marcel Petiot pretended to run a Resistance network, and killed, for their treasure, Jews and others trying to escape to Argentina. (Unknown)

The most notorious criminal of the period was Doctor Marcel Petiot. Petiot purchased a house at 21 Rue Le Sueur in the 16th arrondissement, and under the name of Docteur Eugène, pretended to be the head of a Resistance network that smuggled Jews from France to Argentina. He collected large advances from his clients, and then instructed them to come to his house, bringing their gold, silver and other valuables with them. After they arrived, he brought them to his consulting room, and, convincing them vaccination was required in order to enter Argentina, gave them a lethal intravenous injection, then watched their slow death in an adjacent room through a spyhole in the door. Afterward, he cut up their bodies, put the pieces in the well, and dissolved them with quicklime. His activities attracted the attention of the Gestapo, which arrested him in 1943, thus allowing him to claim later that he had been a real member of the Resistance. His crimes were discovered after the Liberation in 1944, and he was charged with the murders of 27 persons, tried in 1946, and sentenced to death. He went to the guillotine on 25 May 1946. The gold, silver, and other valuables were not found when he was arrested. In search of the treasure, the house was carefully demolished in 1966, but no trace of it was ever found.

== The Resistance ==
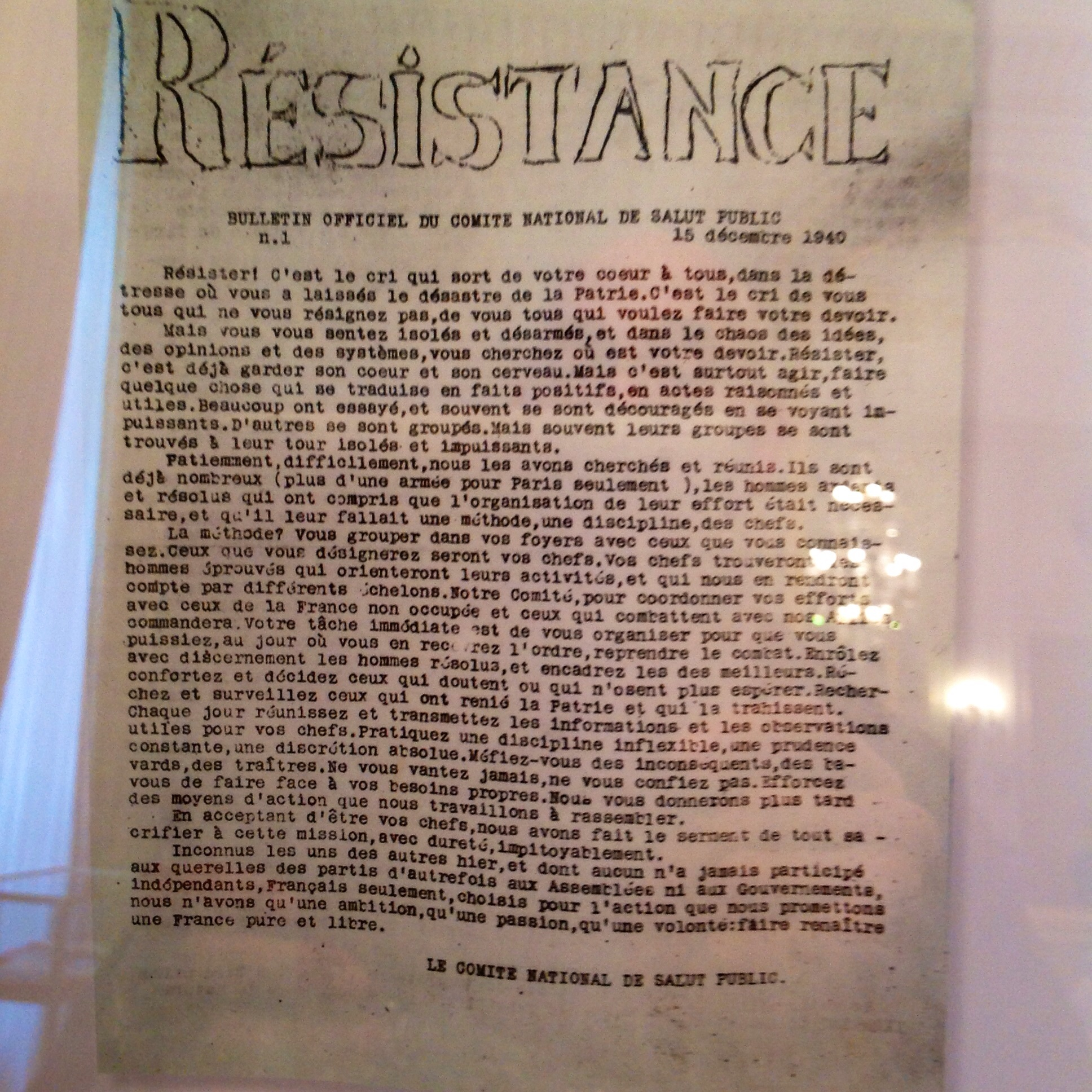
First issue of the underground newspaper 'Résistance', 15 December 1940 (SiefkinDR)

Poster announcing that the Germans will take hostages in retaliation for attacks on German soldiers, 21 August 1941 (Gallica Digital Library)

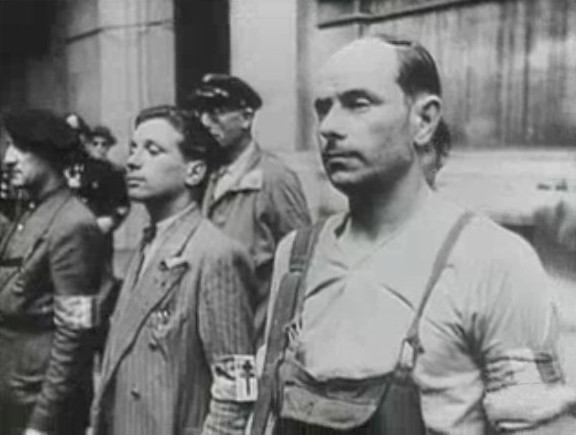
Resistance fighters in Paris, August 1944 (La Libération de Paris 1944)

On 18 June 1940, Parisians listening to the BBC heard an obscure French brigadier General, Charles de Gaulle, in London, make an appeal (Appel du 18 juin) to continue the resistance against the Germans. Very few heard the broadcast at the time, but it was widely printed and circulated afterwards. On 23 June, the German occupation authorities ordered all French persons to turn in any weapons and short-wave receivers they possessed, or face severe measures. Within Paris, opposition was isolated and slow to build. On 2 August, De Gaulle was condemned to death for treason, in absentia, by Marshal Pétain's new government.

The first illegal demonstration in Paris against the occupation took place on 11 November 1940, the anniversary of the end of World War I, a day that usually featured patriotic ceremonies of remembrance. Anticipating trouble, the German authorities banned any commemorations, and made it a regular school and work day. Nonetheless, the students of Paris lycées (high schools) circulated handbills and leaflets calling for students to boycott classes and meet at the Tomb of the Unknown Soldier beneath the Arc de Triomphe. The event was also announced on 10 November on the BBC. The day began quietly, as some 20,000 students laid wreaths and bouquets at the tomb and statue of Georges Clemenceau, on Place Clemenceau, by the Champs-Élysées. This part of the day was tolerated by the French and German authorities. At midday, the demonstration became more provocative; some students carried a floral Cross of Lorraine, the symbol of De Gaulle's Free France. They were chased away by the police. At nightfall, the event became more provocative; some 3,000 students gathered, chanting "Vive la France" and "Vive l'Angleterre", and invading Le Tyrol, a bar popular with the Jeune Front, a fascist youth group, and scuffling with police. At 6 p.m., German soldiers arrived, surrounded the students, and closed the entrance of the metro stations. They charged the students with fixed bayonets, firing shots in the air. The Vichy government announced 123 arrests and one student wounded. The students arrested were taken to the prisons of La Santé, Cherche-Midi and Fresnes, where they were beaten, slapped, stripped, and made to stand all night in the pouring rain. Some students were threatened by soldiers pretending to be a firing squad. As a consequence of the demonstration, the Sorbonne was closed, students were required to regularly report to the police, and the Latin Quarter was closely watched.

Another incident took place on 10 November; a 28-year-old French engineer named Jacques Bonsergent and his friends, coming home from a wedding, encountered a group of German soldiers in the blackout, and got into a brawl. A German soldier was punched. Bonsergent's friends escaped, but he was arrested and refused to give the names of his friends to the Germans. He was held in jail for nineteen days, taken to court, charged with "an act of violence against a member of the German Army", and sentenced to death. Bonsergent was executed by firing squad on 23 December, the first civilian in France executed for resistance against the occupation. In 1946, the metro station Jacques Bonsergent was named after him.

The first significant Resistance organization in Paris was formed in September 1940 by a group of scholars connected with the Musée de l'Homme, the ethnology museum located at the Palais de Chaillot. On 15 December, using the museum mimeograph machine, they published Résistance, a four-page newspaper which gave its name to the movement that followed. The group was led by the Russian-born (French naturalized) anthropologist Boris Vildé. The first issue of the newspaper, proclaimed: "We are independent, simply French, chosen for the action we wish to carry out. We have only one ambition, one passion, one desire: to recreate France, pure and free." They collected information and established a network to help escaped French POWs to flee the country. They were not experienced conspirators, and they were discovered and arrested in January 1941. Vildé and the six other leaders were sentenced to death and executed by firing squad at Fort Mont Valérien, in the western suburbs of the city, on 22 February 1942.

Most of the resistance by ordinary Parisians was symbolic: encouraged by the BBC, students scribbled the letter V for Victory on walls, blackboards, tables, and the sides of cars. The Germans tried to co-opt the 'V' campaign, placing huge Vs symbolizing their own victories, on the Eiffel Tower and National Assembly, but with little effect.

From the signing of the Molotov–Ribbentrop Pact in August 1939, until June 1941, the communists played no active part in the Resistance. The Vichy government and Germans allowed their newspapers to publish, and they made no mention of the patriotic demonstrations on 11 November. But after Operation Barbarossa, the German attack on the Soviet Union on 22 June 1941, they became among the most active and best-organized forces against the Germans. They remained hostile to De Gaulle, whom they denounced as a reactionary British puppet. On 21 August 1941, a 21-year-old veteran communist named Pierre Georges, who used the clandestine name "Fabien", shot a German naval officer, Alfons Moser, in the back, as he was boarding the metro at the Barbés-Rochecouart station. The Germans had routinely taken hostages among the French civilian population to deter attacks. They responded to the Barbés-Rochechouart metro attack by executing three hostages in Paris, and another 20 the following month. Hitler was furious at the leniency of the German commander, and demanded that in case of future assassinations, there must be one hundred hostages executed for every German killed. After the next killing of a German, 48 hostages were immediately shot by firing squad. From London, General De Gaulle condemned the communist policy of random assassinations, saying the cost in innocent civilian lives was too high, and it had no impact on the war, but the random shooting of Germans continued. In retaliation, an estimated 1,400 hostages from the Paris region were taken and 981 executed by the German military at Fort Mont Valérien.

Acts of resistance in Paris became more dangerous. In the spring of 1942, five students of the Lycée Buffon decided to protest the arrest of one of their teachers. About 100 students took part, chanting the teacher's name and throwing leaflets. The demonstrators escaped, but the police tracked down and arrested the five student leaders, who were tried and executed on 8 February 1943.

As the war continued, the Resistance was divided largely between the groups, followers of General De Gaulle in London, and those organized by the communists. Thanks to pressure from the British, who supplied the weapons, and the diplomacy of one Resistance leader, Jean Moulin, who created the National Council of the Resistance (Conseil National de la Résistance (CNR)), the different factions began to coordinate their actions. In early 1944, as the Normandy invasion approached, the communists and their allies controlled the largest and best-armed resistance groups in Paris: the Francs-Tireurs et Partisans (FTP). In February 1944, the FTP became part of a larger umbrella organization, the Forces françaises de l'intérieur (FFI). Following the Normandy invasion on 6 June (D-Day), the FFI prepared to launch an uprising to liberate the city before the Allied Armies and General De Gaulle arrived.

== Liberation ==
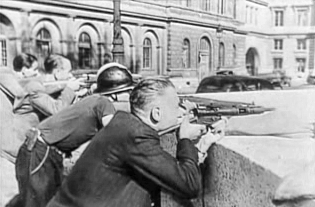
The uprising against the Germans in Paris began on 19 August 1944, with the takeover of the police headquarters and other government buildings (La Libération de Paris 1944)

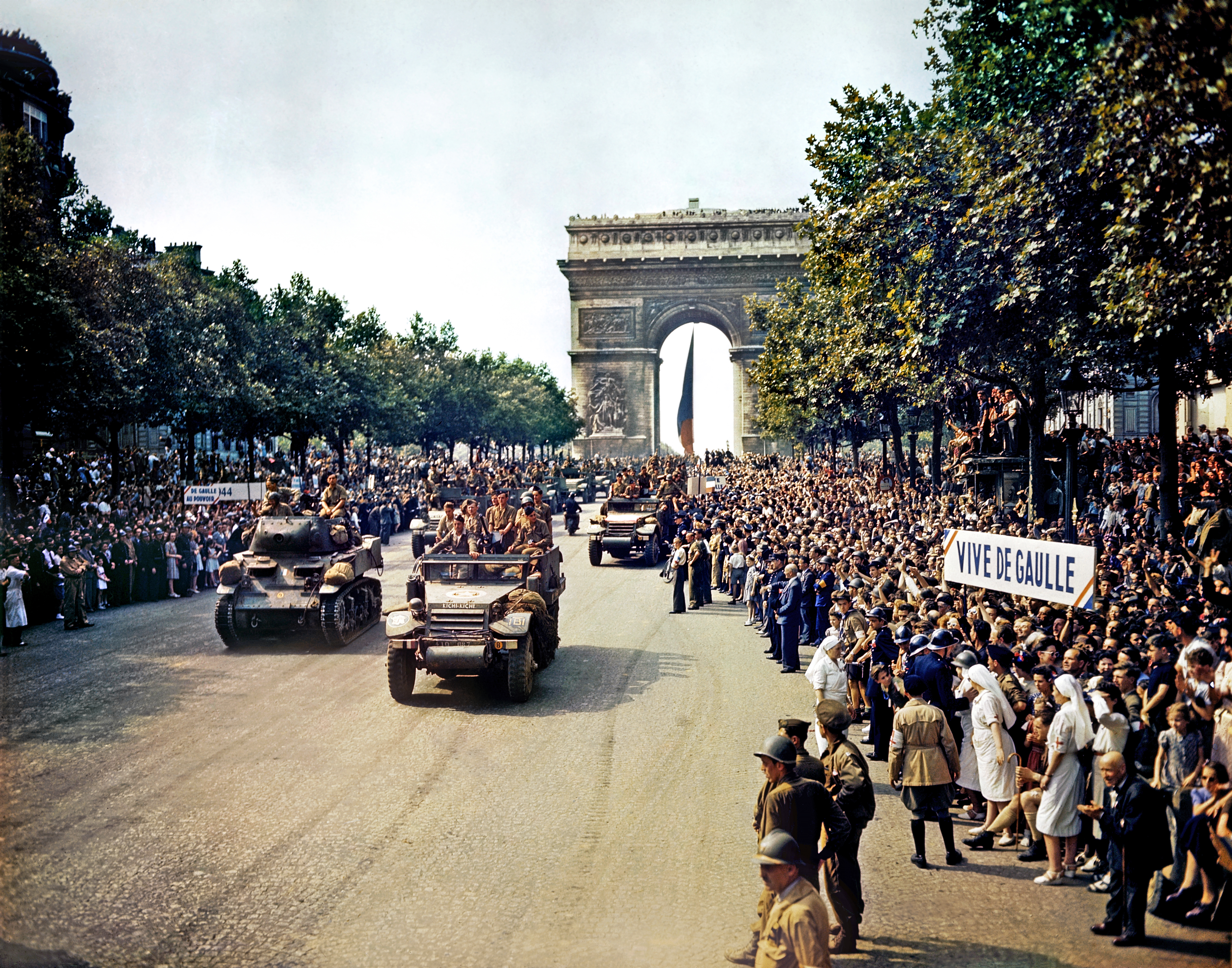
The French 2nd Armored Division of General Philippe Leclerc de Hauteclocque parades on the Champs-Élysées on 26 August 1944. (Kodachrome by Jack Downey, U.S. Office of War Information)

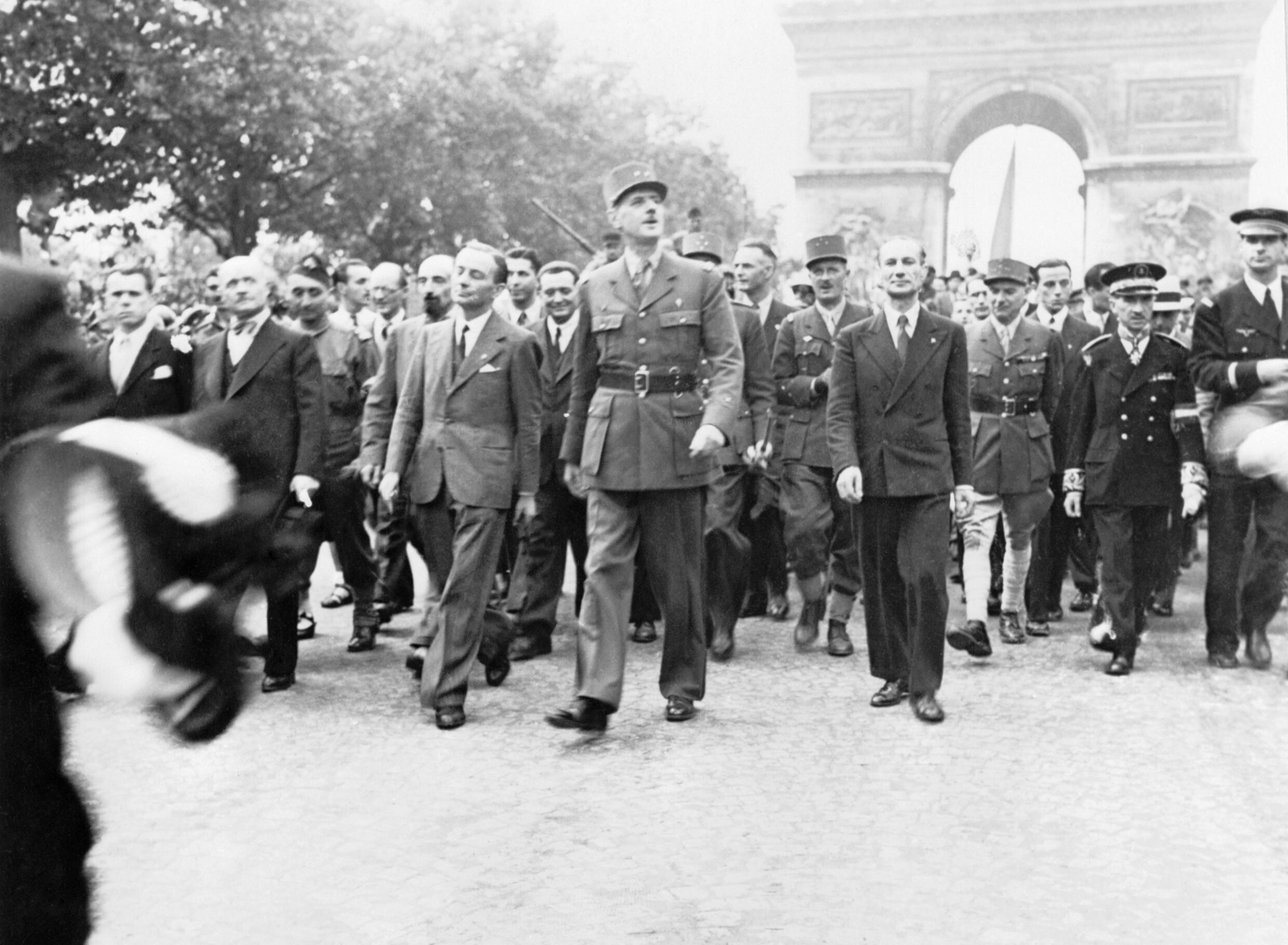
On 26 August 1944, General Charles de Gaulle leads the parade celebrating the liberation of Paris the previous day. Marcel Flouret is second from the right. (Unknown, Imperial War Museums, U.K.)

The Allies landed at Normandy on 6 June 1944, and two months later broke the German lines and began to advance toward and around Paris. German control over Paris was already breaking down. Some 100,000 Parisians had turned out on 14 July for a prohibited celebration of Bastille Day. German soldiers fired into the air, but the French police did nothing. On 10 August, half of the 80,000 railroad workers in the Paris region went on strike, stopping all railroad traffic. On 15 August, the new German commander of Paris, General Dietrich von Choltitz, ordered that 3,000 resistance members held in Paris jails be transferred out of the city. They were loaded into trains, 170 persons in each cattle car, and sent to the concentration camps of Buchenwald and Ravensbrück. Only 27 returned. On the same day, the Paris police learned that policemen in the suburbs were being disarmed by the Germans; they immediately went on strike. In Paris, most of the electricity and gas were cut off, there was little food available, and the metro had stopped running.

On 19 August, against the opposition of De Gaulle's representative in Paris, Jacques Chaban-Delmas, the National Council of the Resistance and the Parisian Committee on Liberation jointly called for an immediate uprising. It was commanded by the regional leader of the communist-led FFI, Colonel Henri Rol-Tanguy. Chaban-Delmas reluctantly agreed to participate. Liberation Committees in each neighborhood occupied the government buildings and headquarters of collaborationist newspapers, and put up barricades in the northern and eastern neighborhoods, where the Resistance was the strongest. To the surprise of Henri Rol-Tanguy, the Paris police also joined in the uprising; a thousand policemen occupied the Prefecture of Police, the police headquarters on the Île de la Cité.

At the time of the uprising, most of elite German units had left the city, but 20,000 German soldiers remained, armed with about 80 tanks and 60 artillery pieces. While the Resistance had about 20,000 fighters, they had only 60 hand guns, a few machine guns, and no heavy weapons. Nonetheless, on the morning of 20 August, a small group of Resistance fighters, led by Marcel Flouret, walked into the City Hall of Paris and demanded a transfer of operations. The building was then occupied by the resistance. Rol-Tanguy commanded the uprising from a bunker 26 meters beneath the statue of the Lion de Belfort, Place Denfert-Rochereau, which communicated with the catacombs. Parisians cut down trees and tore up paving stones to build barricades. Scattered sniping and street fighting broke out between the Germans, Milice, and Resistance; prisoners were executed on both sides. The Resistance took weapons from fallen Germans, and even captured trucks and tanks, but neither side ended up with enough military power to defeat the other.

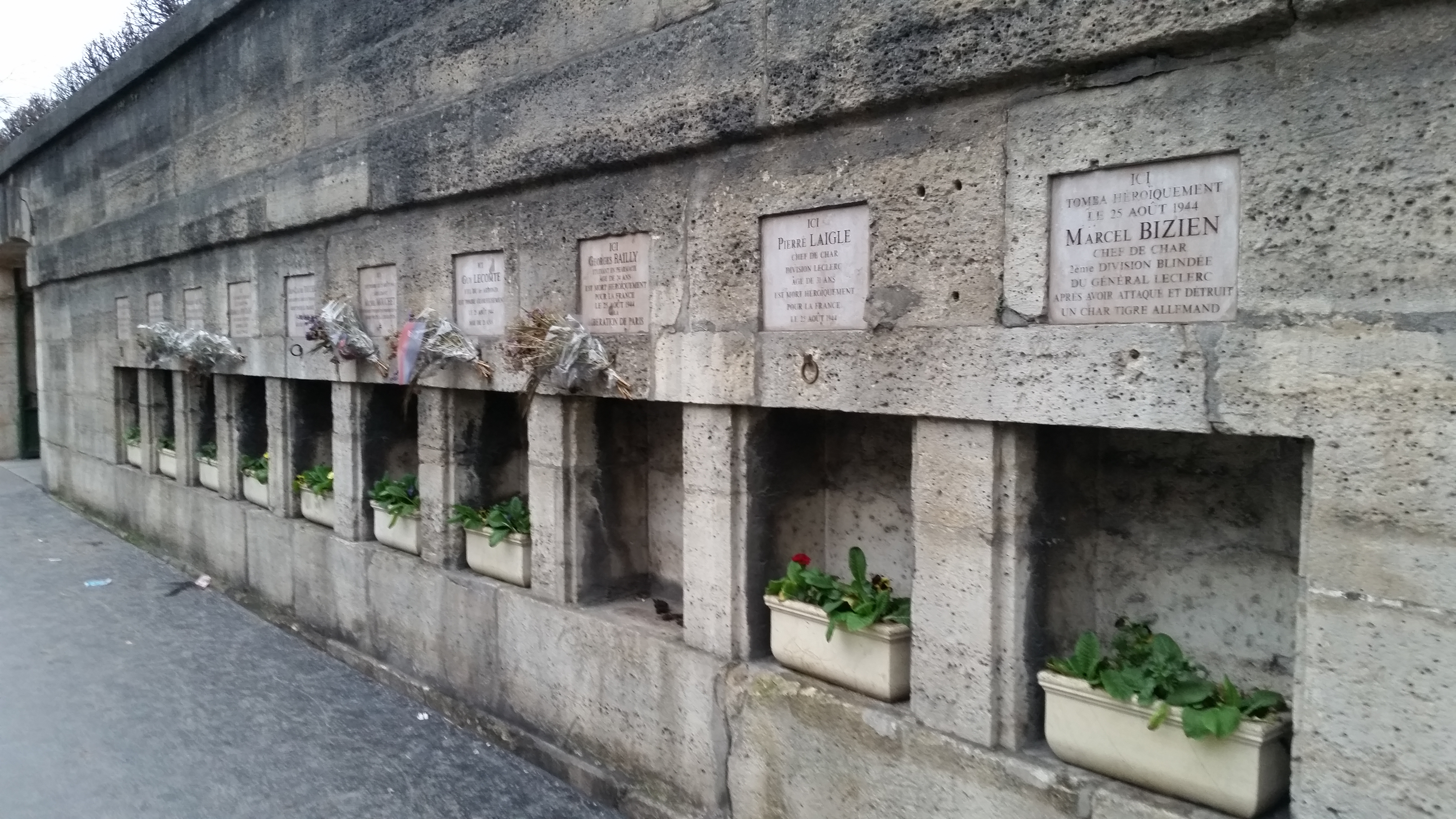
Memorial to those fallen during the liberation

The Allies had originally planned to bypass Paris, to avoid street fighting and the necessity of feeding a huge population. However, when news of the uprising in Paris reached them, Generals Eisenhower and Bradley agreed to send the French 2nd Armored Division of General Leclerc to Paris, and sent the American 4th Armored Division to support them. The 2nd Armored Division set out early in the morning of 23 August with 16,000 men, 4,200 vehicles and 200 tanks. By the afternoon of next day, they were in the western and southern Paris suburbs. On 23 August, Leclerc had sent a small column of three tanks and 11 halftracks, commanded by Captain Dronne, to enter the heart of the city. By 9 p.m. Dronne had reached the Hôtel de Ville, where he was greeted by Georges Bidault, the head of the National Council of the Resistance (Conseil national de la Résistance), and André Tollet, commander of the Paris committee of liberation (Comité parisien de la Libération). Then he went to the Prefecture of Police for a meeting with De Gaulle's representative, Chaban-Delmas. The main force of Leclerc's 2nd Armored Division and the U.S. 4th Infantry Division entered the city on the morning of 25 August. There was fierce resistance near Les Invalides and the École Militaire, in which some French soldiers were killed and tanks destroyed. By the end of the morning, the Germans had been overcome and a large French tricolor flag was hoisted on the Eiffel Tower.

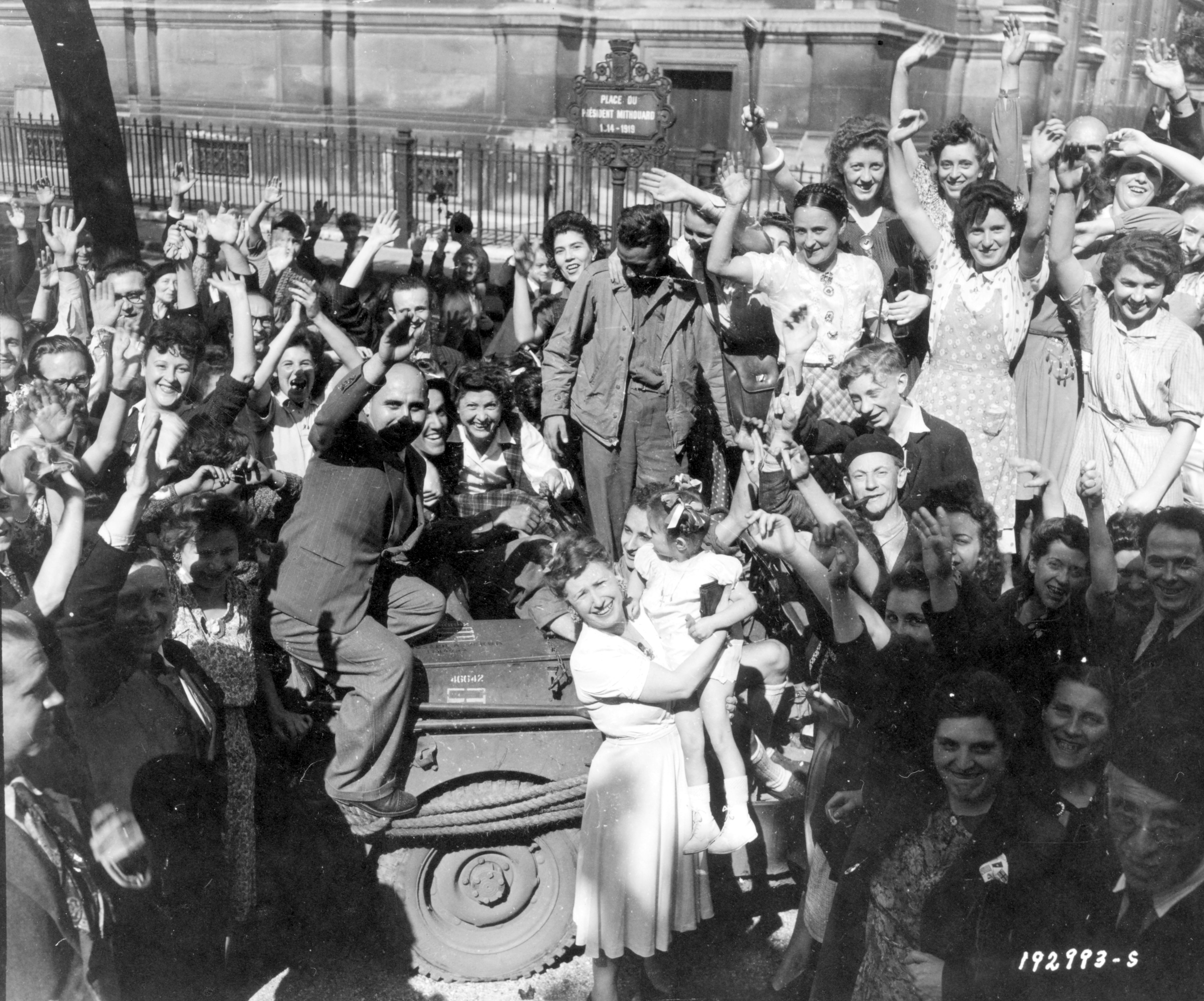
Parisians celebrating the liberation of the city on 25 August 1944

General von Choltitz had been ordered by Hitler to leave the city a "heap of burning ruins", but he also realized the battle was lost, and he did not want to be captured by the Resistance. Through the offices of the Swedish Consul-General, Raoul Nordling, he ignored Hitler's orders and arranged a truce. On the afternoon of 25 August, he traveled from his headquarters in the Hôtel Meurice to the Montparnasse train station, the headquarters of General Leclerc, where, at about 3 p.m. in the billiards room of the station staff, he and Leclerc signed a surrender. Chaban-Delmas and Rol-Tanguy, leader of the FFI, were also present, and it was suggested that Rol-Tanguy should also sign the surrender. Leclerc dictated a new version, and put the name of the FFI leader ahead of his own. The occupation of Paris was officially over.

De Gaulle arrived in Paris two hours later. He met first with Leclerc, complaining to him that Rol-Tanguy had signed the surrender. He then went to the Ministry of War, and insisted that the FFI leaders come to him, but in the end he went to the Hôtel de Ville, where he gave a memorable speech to a huge crowd of Parisians, concluding:

"Paris! Paris humiliated! Paris broken! Paris martyred! But now Paris liberated! Liberated by herself, by her own people with the help of the armies of France, with the support and aid of France as a whole, of fighting France, of the only France, of the true France, of eternal France."

The following day, De Gaulle, on foot, towering over everyone in the crowd, led a triumphal march from the Arc de Triomphe, down the Champs-Élysées, to the Place de la Concorde, then to the Notre-Dame de Paris cathedral, where he took part in a Te Deum.

About 2,000 Parisians were killed in the liberation of their capital, along with about 800 Resistance fighters from the FFI and policemen, and over 100 soldiers from the Free France and US forces.

== Food crisis ==
The liberation was ongoing, but it became apparent that food in Paris was getting scarcer by the day. The French rail network had largely been destroyed by Allied bombing and so getting food in had become a problem, especially since the Germans had stripped Paris of its resources for themselves. The Allies realised the necessity to get Paris back on its feet and pushed a plan for food convoys to get through to the capital as soon as possible. In addition, surrounding towns and villages were requested to supply as much to Paris as possible. The Civil Affairs of SHAEF authorised the import of up to 2,400 tons of food per day at the expense of the military effort. A British food convoy labelled 'Vivres Pour Paris' entered on 29 August, US supplies were flown in via Orléans Airport before they were sent in. Also, 500 tons were delivered a day by the British and another 500 tons by the Americans. Along with French civilians outside Paris bringing in indigenous resources, the food crisis had been overcome within ten days.

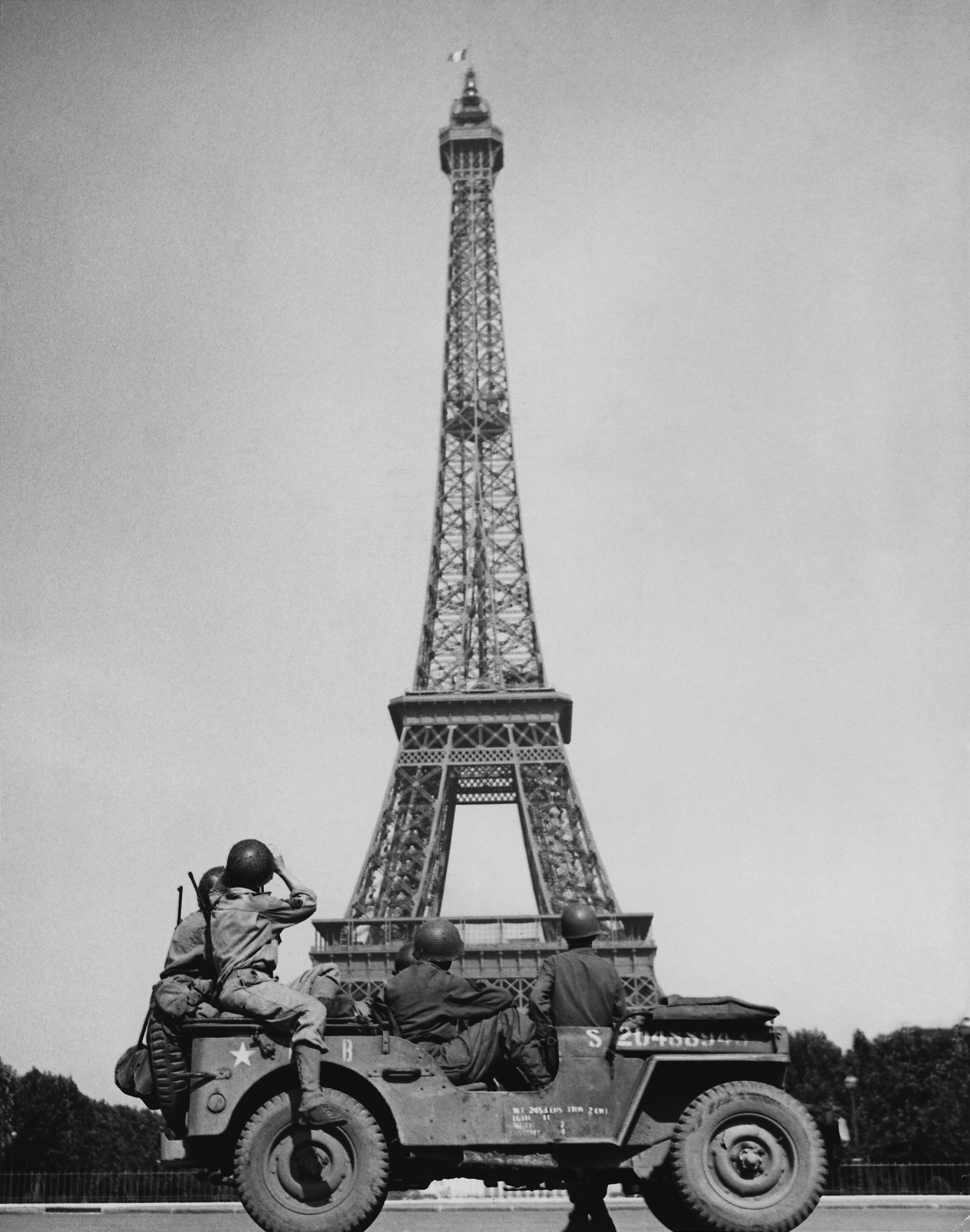
American soldiers look at the French tricolour flying from the Eiffel Tower.

== Vengeance and renewal ==
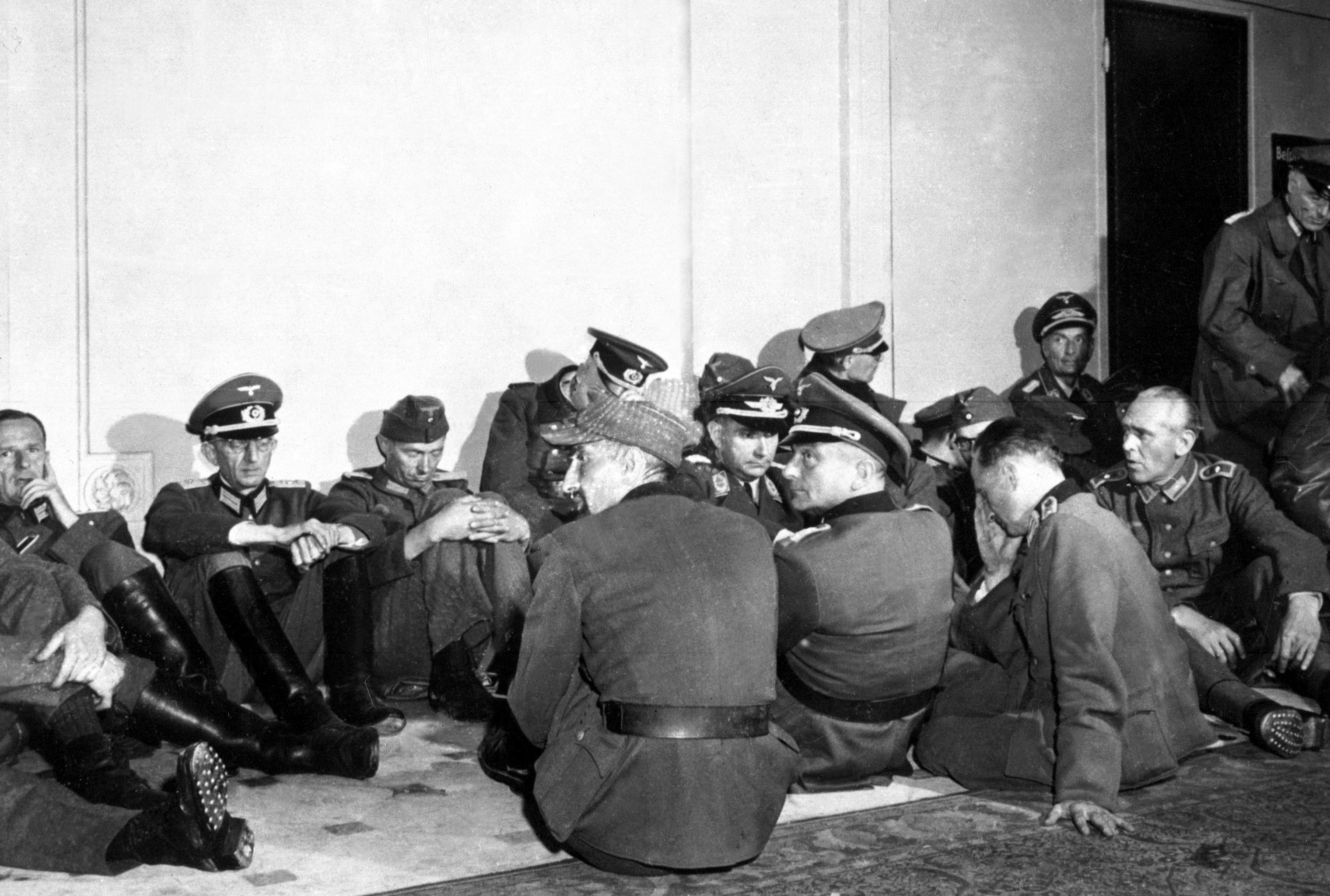
German officers and staff, prisoners at the Hôtel Majestic, the German military headquarters, shortly after the Liberation. (National Archives and Records Administration, USA)

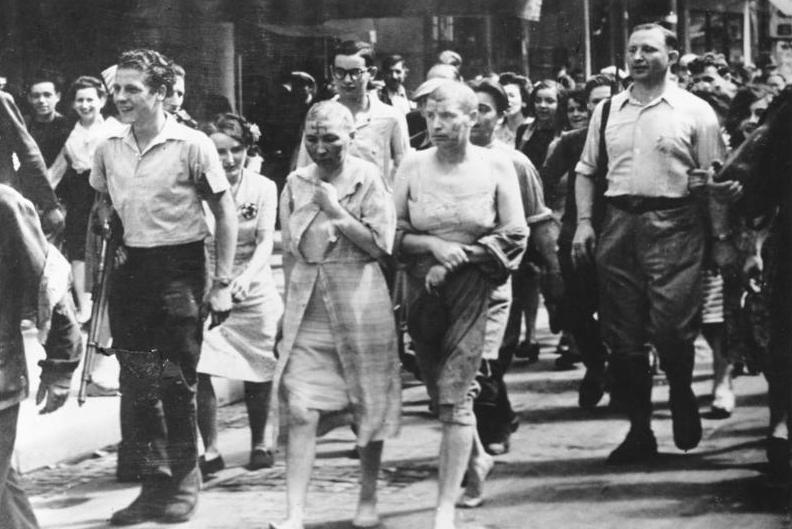
Women accused of sleeping with Germans had their heads shaved (Bundesarchiv, 21 June 1944)

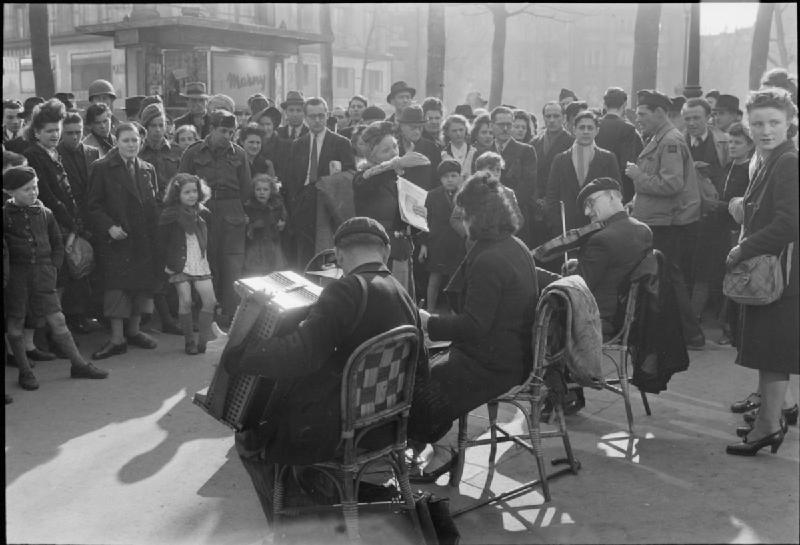
Musicians perform in the streets of Paris in the spring of 1945. The crowd includes several allied soldiers (Imperial War Museums, U.K.)

Immediately following the liberation of the city, Parisians who had collaborated with the Germans were punished. Women who had been accused of allegedly sleeping with German soldiers had their heads shaved and were humiliated. Most of the accusers were men, and many of these women were targets of revenge, or a way that actual collaborators could take the focus off themselves. Some Parisians, including fashion designer Coco Chanel, who had been living with a German officer, quietly left the country, and did not return for many years. 9,969 persons were arrested. A military tribunal was established for those who had collaborated with the German army and police, and a separate judicial tribunal was set up for economic and political collaborators. Of those arrested, 1,616 were acquitted, and 8,335 were found guilty. In the Seine department, the two tribunals sentenced 598 collaborators to death, of whom 116 were executed; the others, who had escaped from France, were condemned in absentia.

The Liberation did not immediately bring peace to Paris; a thousand persons were killed and injured by a German bombing raid on 26 August, and the city and region suffered from attacks by German V-1 rockets, beginning on 3 September; food rationing and other restrictions remained in force through the end of the war, but the climate of fear had disappeared.

The political life of the city was gradually renewed, under the close watch of General De Gaulle. On 27 August, the Council of Ministers held its first meeting at the Hôtel Matignon since 1940. In October, a provisional municipal council was established, but it did not formally meet until March and April 1945. The first issue of a new newspaper, Le Monde, was published on 18 December 1944. On 13 April 1945, just before the end of war, a new ordinance set the date for the first municipal elections since the war began. They were held on 29 April, and for the first time, French women were allowed to vote.

== See also ==
- Fall of France
- Dietrich von Choltitz
- German military administration in occupied France during World War II
- Liberation of Paris
- Épuration légale
- Liberation of France
