= Marcel Flouret =

French engineer, soldier and civil servant

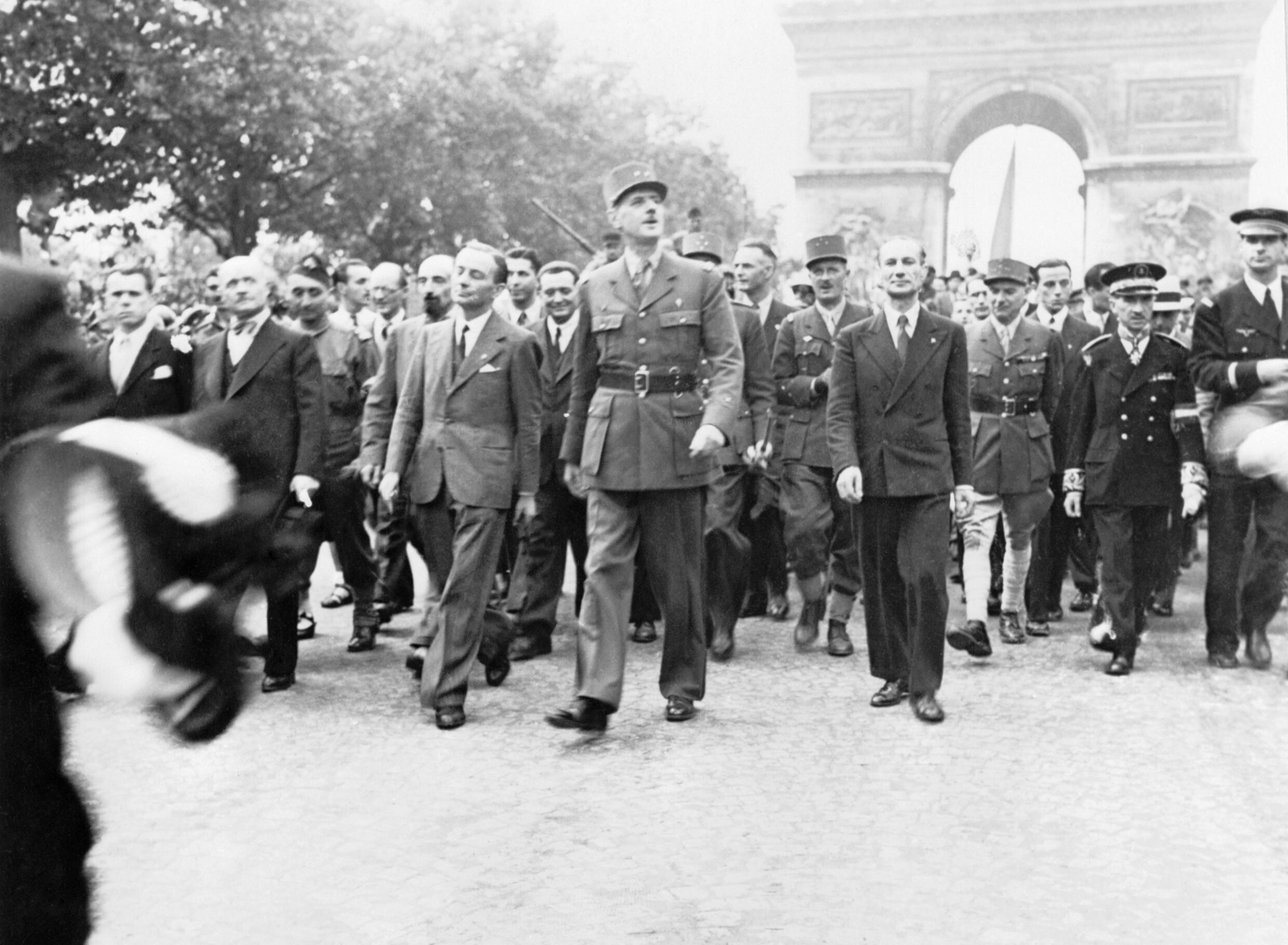
- Marcel Flouret (2nd from right) with General de Gaulle during the liberation of Paris in August 1944
- Born: March 29, 1892; Bergerac, France
- Died: November 29, 1971 (aged 79); Mougins, France
- Education: École polytechnique
- Occupations: Engineer, Industrialist
- Known for: Chair of Électricité de France (1952–1962); French Resistance
- Spouse: Paule Anna Machac (July 1, 1922 – )
- Awards: Grand Cross of the Legion of Honour; Commander of the Ordre des Arts et des Lettres; Medal of Freedom; Croix de Guerre

Marcel Flouret (March 29, 1892 – November 29, 1971) was a French engineer, soldier, civil servant, member of the French Resistance, and fourth Chair of Électricité de France (EDF) from 1952 to 1962.

== Career ==
Flouret graduated from the École Polytechnique in 1912. Committed to the army for four years initially, he became a Second Lieutenant on August 2, 1914, a Lieutenant Airman on August 2, 1916, and an aviation squadron leader and Captain on December 29, 1920. Wounded, Flouret earned the Croix de Guerre with four citations. On foreign missions from 1920 to 1925, Flouret participated in aviation operations in Austria and Hungary. He then became a professor at the War College at the Center of Advanced Military Studies in Warsaw, Poland. After entering the War College in March 1925, he then transferred to the Ministry of Finance as Deputy Chief of Staff for Joseph Caillaux on April 18, 1925, and left the army in November 1925.

Various bureaucratic roles followed from 1925 to at least 1944, including becoming the Chief of staff of the Minister of Finance, Vincent Auriol on June 4, 1936, and becoming the Director of Staff for Auriol, the Minister of Justice, on July 1, 1937. He was mobilized as a Lieutenant Colonel in September 1939 until June 1940. He was the director of staff for Blocus Georges Monnet and Bertrand Pujo in 1940.

He was a French Resistance member, operating under the name Fevrier – February, when he took City Hall of Paris on August 20, 1944. Flouret performed the duties of Prefect of the Seine Department from September 2, 1944, with Edgar Pisani, future minister of General de Gaulle, as the director of his cabinet.

Following the liberation of France, Flouret became an executive at various organizations. This included becoming an Honorary Prefect of the Department of Seine in August 1946, the chair of the national railways, SNCF, in September 1946, the Governor of the Banque de l'Algérie et de la Tunisie on May 18, 1949, and the Chair of Électricité de France (EDF) in 1952. His role at SNCF ended in 1949. Flouret was the Chair of EDF for ten years from 1952 to 1962, after which he took an honorary chair role. He was known for investing heavily in the electrification of France after World War II.

Flouret died in Mougins in 1971.

== Awards ==
- Grand Cross of the Legion of Honour (January 15, 1954)
- Commander of the Ordre des Arts et des Lettres (March 26, 1962)
- Medal of Freedom
- Croix de Guerre (World War I)

== Publications ==
- Marcel Flouret (1949). "Une société nationale d'économie mixte : la SNCF". SNCF. Rennes conference.
