= Saint-Rambert-d'Albon =

- Commune
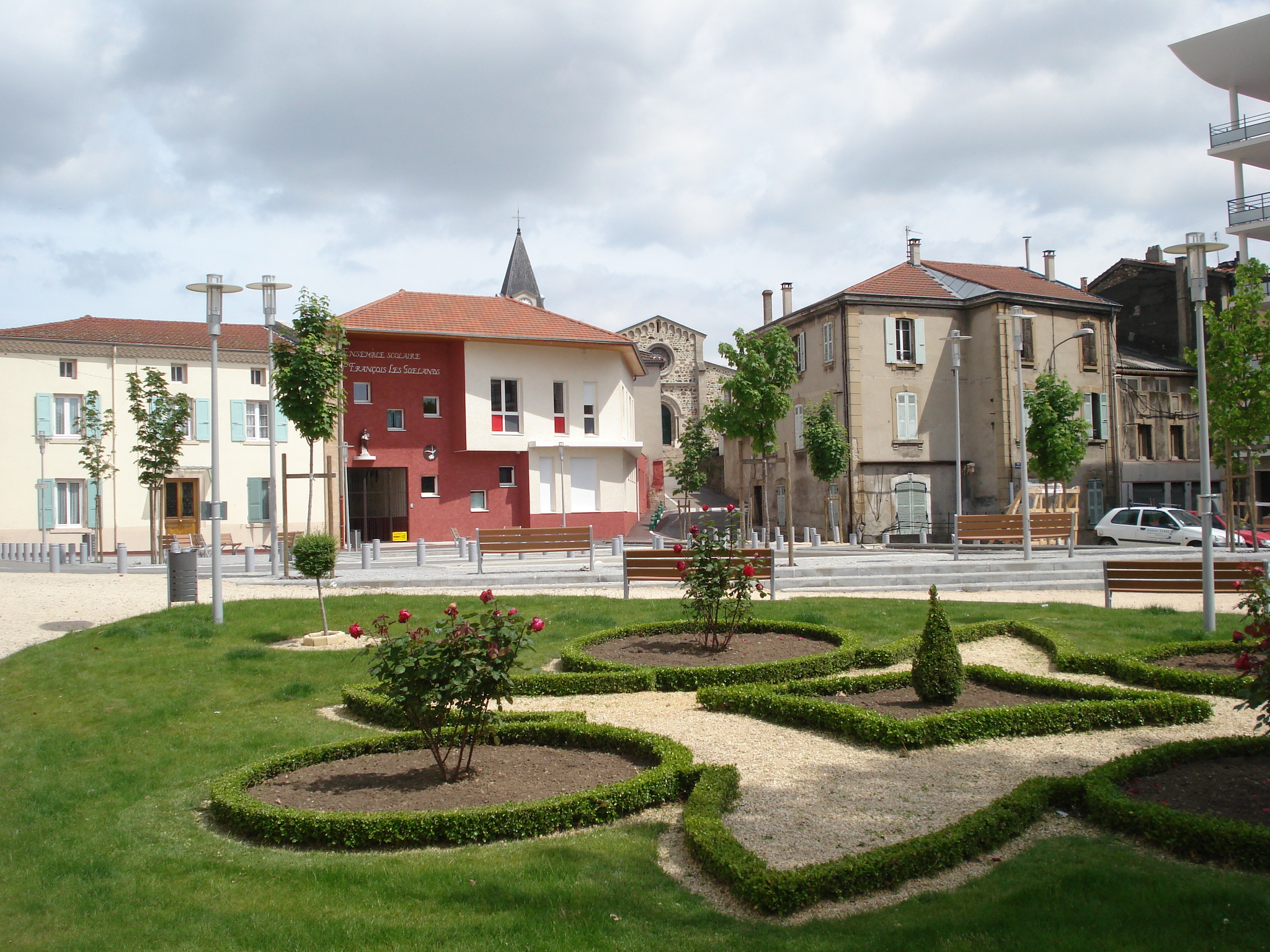
- A view within Saint-Rambert-d'Albon

- Coat of arms
- Location of Saint-Rambert-d'Albon
- Location within France Location within Auvergne-Rhône-Alpes
- Coordinates: 45°17′41″N 4°49′03″E
- Country: France
- Region: Auvergne-Rhône-Alpes
- Department: Drôme
- Arrondissement: Valence
- Canton: Saint-Vallier

Government
  - Mayor (2020–2026): Gérard Oriol
- Area^{1}: 13.41 km^{2} (5.18 sq mi)
- Elevation: 158 m (518 ft)
- Highest elevation: 186 m (610 ft)
- Lowest elevation: 135 m (443 ft)
- Population (2023): 7,001
  - Density: 522.1/km^{2} (1,352/sq mi)
- Time zone: UTC+01:00 (CET)
  - Summer (DST): UTC+02:00 (CEST)
- INSEE/Postal code: 26325 /26140
- ^{1} French Land Register data, which excludes lakes, ponds, glaciers > 1 km^{2} (0.386 sq mi or 247 acres) and river estuaries.

Saint-Rambert-d'Albon (French pronunciation: [sɛ̃ ʁɑ̃bɛʁ dalbɔ̃], literally Saint-Rambert of Albon; Arpitan: Sent-Rambèrt) is a commune in the Drôme department in southeastern France, in the Auvergne-Rhône-Alpes region.

== Population ==
Historical population

Year	Pop.	±% p.a.
1841	881	—
1846	891	+0.23%
1851	920	+0.64%
1856	1,079	+3.24%
1861	1,304	+3.86%
1866	1,252	−0.81%
1872	1,210	−0.57%
1876	1,261	+1.04%
1881	1,340	+1.22%
1886	1,501	+2.30%
1891	1,756	+3.19%
1896	2,005	+2.69%
1901	2,142	+1.33%
1906	2,370	+2.04%
1911	2,531	+1.32%
1921	2,564	+0.13%

Year	Pop.	±% p.a.
1926	2,619	+0.43%
1931	2,818	+1.48%
1936	2,841	+0.16%
1946	3,020	+0.61%
1954	3,229	+0.84%
1962	3,472	+0.91%
1968	3,822	+1.61%
1975	4,186	+1.31%
1982	4,062	−0.43%
1990	4,176	+0.35%
1999	4,302	+0.33%
2007	5,198	+2.39%
2012	6,056	+3.10%
2017	6,530	+1.52%
2023	7,001	+1.17%

Source: EHESS and INSEE (1968-2023)

== Notable residents ==
- Wilfride Piollet, ballerina

== International relations ==
Saint-Rambert-d'Albon is twinned with:

- Kernen im Remstal, Germany
- Mango, Italy

== See also ==
- Communes of the Drôme department
