= Wilfride Piollet =

French ballerina and choreographer

Wilfride Piollet (28 April 1943 – 20 January 2015) was a French ballerina and choreographer. She was born in Saint-Rambert-d'Albon. Her philosophy of dance and her research led to the publication of several books. Piollet joined the Paris Opera Ballet company in 1960. She gained the rank "coryphée" in 1963, "sujet" in 1964, soloist in 1966, and was promoted to principal dancer (étoile) in 1969. In 1973, Nouvelle lune c-à-d (Andy Degroat) was created for her retirement of the Paris Opera. Invited as a guest by Rudolf Nureyev, she danced at the Paris Opera until 1990, the year when Jean Guizerix left (Carte Blanche). At the Paris Opera and worldwide, she performed the classical, neo-classical and contemporary repertory, and from the 1980s, the Baroque and Renaissance ones. She ended her dance career in 2003 with a piece on Isadora Duncan's dances studied with Madeleine Lytton, and performed with Jean Guizerix.

== Biography ==
Wilfride Piollet attended the Paris Opera Ballet School in 1955 and was integrated into the corps de ballet of the Paris Opera Ballet five years later. By 1969, she was named Danseuse Etoile, and in 1983, she left. She began teaching at the Conservatoire de Paris in 1989. Main teachers were:

- Ballet : Lioubov Egorova, Marguerite Guillaumin, Vera Volkova, Yves Brieux, Serge Perrault, Serge Peretti
- Jazz : Gene Robinson
- Mime : Georges Wague
- Piano : Marguerite Long

Maurice Béjart gave her her first soloist role in Noces in 1965. She was promoted to the rank of Principal dancer in Harald Lander's Etudes in 1969. She performed at the Paris Opera and throughout the world the leading roles of the classical repertory (Giselle, Swan Lake, Sleeping Beauty, Coppelia…) with amongst others, Rudolf Nureyev, Cyril Atanassoff, and Fernando Bujones. Interested in contemporary creations of Merce Cunningham, Lucinda Childs, Douglas Dunn, Andy Degroat, Félix Blaska, Dominique Bagouet and Daniel Larrieu, she formed a duet on stage and in everyday life with her husband Jean Guizerix . She also danced the neoclassical works of Georges Balanchine (Agon…), Jerome Robbins (En sol…), Serge Lifar (Suite en Blanc…) and Roland Petit (Notre-Dame de Paris…). From 1977 onwards, she choreographed her own pieces such as The Wooden Prince, Eight Hungarian Dances, Fox, Lettera amorosa, Dam'Oisel, Momerie, Figurative Ballet, Penthésilée, and The Conspiracy. In 1986, she danced in the Baroque creation Atys of Francine Lancelot. Between 1986 and 2003 she ran with Jean Guizerix the Piollet-Guizerix company presenting choreographies like Gondolages, Giselle échappée, L'éléphant et les faons, Tierce galante ... From 1989 to 2008, she taught her pioneering training method and Ballet repertory at the Conservatoire national supérieur de musique et de danse de Paris (CNSMDP).

She made a books series for children and their teachers called Les gestes de Lilou. In 2008, it was uploaded online and published in 2012 by Clef de Sole.

From 1990 onwards, she started to recreate some standards of the ballet repertory (Coppélia ... ) and to carry on her choreographic practice in different shapes and forms: Le petit Atelier, Romance, L'Amour médecin (2005) for the Comédie-Française, and Anonymes (2006), for the National School of Circus Art ( l'Ecole Nationale des Arts du Cirque) at Rosny-sous-bois. After 2009, she worked with the Strasbourg Conservatoire (conservatoire à rayonnement régional de Strasbourg) (commissioned works, conferences, pedagogy).

She married Jean Guizerix.

== Research ==
In 1973, while working with Merce Cunningham for the Un jour ou deux creation at the Paris Opera, she realised after a class that her movements were much easier than after a traditional warm-up. From then on, she stopped working at the barre and started straight in the middle of the studio. This would be the beginning of a whole research process which led her to devise a pioneering technique in movement understanding called Flexible Barres.

Working on body memory and the use of imaginary, she entirely rethought dancer training, developing a practice out of any specific aesthetic. She was particularly influenced by the notions of AFCMD (analyse fonctionnelle du corps dans le mouvement dansé - body and dance movement functional analysis), drawn from her collaboration with Odile Rouquet and her encounter with Bonnie Bainbridge Cohen.

== Pedagogy ==
Since 1990, she has collaborated with Noëlle Simonet to write in Laban notation the exercises of her method. At the CNSMDP she is supervising the analysis work of Claire Roucolle (2005), Linièle Chane and Kyung-eun Shim (2008) for their final exams in Laban Notation. She takes part in dance related events and gives conferences in France and worldwide, such as Sur la trace des Dames Blanches, commissioned by the Cinémathèque française de la Danse(Dance videos center).

Several university dissertations were inspired by her conception of dance:

Bachelors

- Élodie Bergerault, 1999, Université Paris VIII - Wilfride Piollet, une pédagogie, un regard d'élève
- Christophe Duveau, 2004, Faculté de Lettres Nice Sophia-Antipolis - La méthode de Wilfride Piollet (précédé d'un Mémoire en analyse fonctionnelle du mouvement dansé, en 1997 - Le rôle du toucher dans les appuis sur le corps)

Masters

- Michel de Saint Rapt, 2005, Université Blaise Pascal Clermont-Ferrand - Wilfride Piollet : Quel corps fait-elle danser?

Thesis

- Nadège Tardieu, 2006, Université Blaise Pascal Clermont-Ferrand - Savoirs en construction dans la danse classique de Wilfride Piollet: Anthropologie de la transmission

From 1990, she was frequently invited to present her work in several universities, arts institutes and international training centers, especially in Nice, Leuven, Montreal, Tokyo, Osaka, Prague and Damascus. In 2002-2003, she became a member of the network led by the Maison des Sciences de l'Homme and La Rochelle University Society, and supported by the Research Ministry and the DMDTS of the Culture and Communication Ministry called: Le mouvement dansé : recherches pluridisciplinaires et processus de création(Dancing movement: pluridisciplinary research and creative process). She was also a member of the Laboratoire d'Anthropologie des Pratiques Corporelles (Labracor), at the Blaise Pascal University (Clermont 2) in Clermont-Ferrand.

== Awards ==
Piollet received the distinction of Commander, National Order of Merit in 1989; and in 2008, she joined its board. From 2010, she was the vice president of artistic higher education at Le Pôle supérieur d'enseignement artistique Paris Boulogne-Billancourt (PSPBB).

== Selected works ==
- 1986 : Parallèle, Wilfride Piollet and Jean Guizerix, Alain Bordas. Book about their lives as interprets.
- 1999 : Rendez-vous sur tes barres flexibles, Wilfride Piollet, in collaboration with Gérard-Georges Lemaire and Jean Guizerix and Barres flexibles (Scores notated by Noëlle Simonet, Claire Bernard, Monique Duquesne, realisation: Francette Levieux). Oiseau de Feu Editions. The first book deals with movement reading and the second is dedicated to the exercises of her training technique. They were reedited by [Editions Sens et Tonka] and [l'Une et l'Autre Editions] in 2005-2008.
- 2012 : Wilfride Piollet Jean Guizerix, Giselle published by [l'Une et l'Autre Editions]. Text by Théophile Gautier for the ballet Giselle from the original edition Les beautés de l'Opéra published in 1844.
