= Jean Guizerix =

French ballet dancer and choreographer (born 1945)

Jean Guizerix (born 27 October 1945) is a French ballet dancer and choreographer.

== Biography ==
Born in Paris in 1945, Guizerix is described as "tall and muscular, with a brooding Basque face". He studied dance privately before he joined the Paris Opera Ballet (1964). He was nominated etoile (star) eight years later. His wife, Wilfride Piollet, is also a former etoile of the Paris Opera Ballet. They created their own company in 1980. His awards include the laureate of French Grand Prix de la Danse (1984) as well as chevalier of the Order for Merits (1989). In 1994, he premiered at the Aix Danse Festival ″Les sept dernières paroles du Christ″ (The seven last words of the Christ) by Joseph Haydn, choreographed by Christine Bastin, Mark Tompkins, Michel Kelemenis, Dominique Boivin, François Raffinot, François Verret, Andy Degroat, and Daniel Larrieu.
