= Organized crime in France =

Organized crime in France is primarily based in major cities in France like Marseille, Grenoble, Paris, and Lyon. It is often referred to in France as grand banditisme or milieu.

From the 1900s to the late 1930s, le milieu primarily engaged in prostitution, bookmaking, fencing, and hijacking. The favored criminal activity in France turned to bank robbery, drug trafficking, and smuggling from 1940 to the late 1970s. The 1980s saw a resurgence of large-scale bank robberies and heists. From 1990 to 2000, criminal organizations established complex extortion rings in Marseille extending to Aix-en-Provence and the greater French Riviera. Since 2002, Le Milieu is known for, in addition to its extortion rings, large counterfeiting and white-collar crime operations. Due to increased financial regulation, Le Milieu has collectively pushed to integrate their crime profits into the legal economy.

France's geographical location makes it an attractive venue for trafficking (i.e. smuggling) and counterfeiting. The port of Marseille is a hub for Le Milieu to move large amounts of product into domestic and European markets. Low economic development continues to be the largest factor in youth joining French criminal organizations.

The most prominent criminal organization within Le Milieu is the Corsican mafia (milieu corse). Although the mafia has encompassed many criminal groups from the 1960s to the 1980s, modern (1990s–present) criminal activity is managed by the Marseille-based Unione Corse and Northern Corsica–based Gang de la Brise de Mer (i.e. "the sea breeze gang"). In 2007, an internal conflict led to the deaths of 102 people on the island of Corsica fracturing the influence of the two larger groups in the island (Brise de mer gang and Colonna family). Both mobs remain powerful as of 2024 and often control nightclubs, bars, restaurants, apartments, and hotels in Aix-en-Provence, Marseille and the French Riviera. In 2016, it was estimated that France's organized crime net US$23 billion in its underground economy.

== Terms used ==
The term milieu literally means middle or environment and figuratively society or environment, used as shorthand for le milieu criminel (criminal environment) or le milieu interlope (illegal environment). The generic term can designate any type it criminal society (e.g.: le milieu chinois, short for le milieu criminel chinois, the Chinese criminal underworld), when used without additional info or context (Le milieu) it is inferred as native historical French criminal society and it refers to the set of criminal figures operating in the French metropolitan areas who are known to the public for being involved in high level organized crime. Members working within the milieu are collectively known as the French mob. This category does not include criminal organizations that were formed in another country and operate within France (e.g. the Campanian Camorra, Serbian mafia, Albanian mafia, Chinese Triads, or Kurdish terrorist PKK). French gangs considered part of the milieu usually have long-standing ties to the country. An increase in youth-centered gang activity lead to the separation of the Milieu.

- "Traditional Milieu" (1930 to 1989): encompasses the older, foundational criminal organizations of the French underworld
- "French Corsican mafia" or "Milieu corso-marseillais" (1990–present): encompasses the newer, modern criminal groups in France and Corsica

== Organization ==
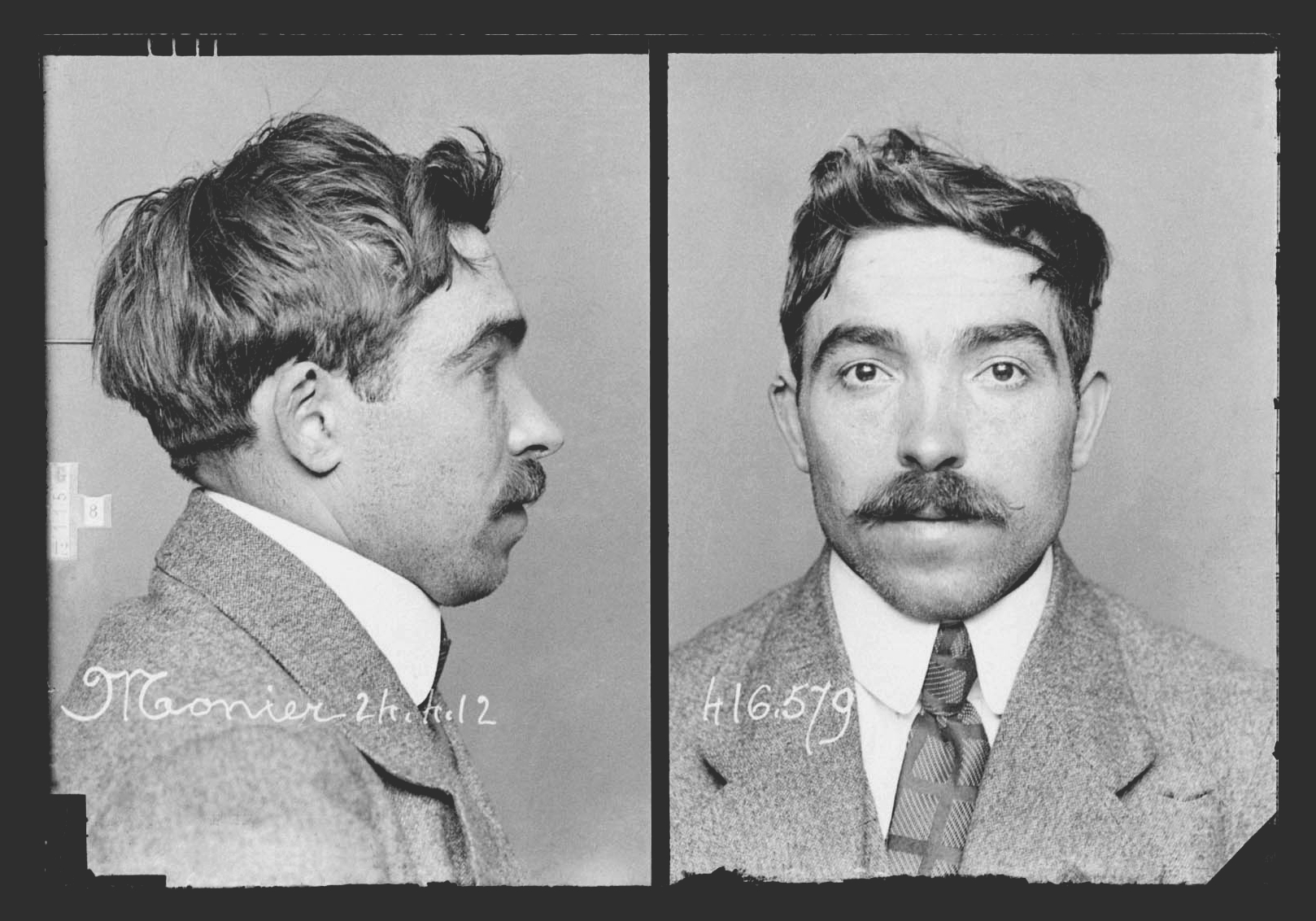
Étienne Monier, a beau voyou of the Bande à Bonnot

Due to the early historical connection the Corsican mafia shares with the Sicilian one, the modern structure of most French mobs typically break down into crime families with a strict hierarchy. Usually the goodfellas that carry out "orders" are known as une équipe multi-qualifiée (i.e. a multi-skilled team) composed of les beaux voyous (i.e. "the good fellows"). Most of these groups of members maintain and protect "mouvances" (i.e. territory). Members of the French Mob are highly professional as compared to lower-level crime groups in that they usually split their work by specialty (e.g. some members serve as the "brain", while others the "muscle" and/or "specialist").

- Caïd (French: [kay-id] "the big boss"; "the boss")
- Parrain (French: [pah-rahn] "godfather")
- Spécialiste (French: [speh-sjah-leest] "specialist")
- Associés ("associate")
- Beaux voyous ([bow vwah-yo] "goodfella"; "the good fellows")

Externally, and more generally, the organization of the French mob is as follows:

- Le Milieu (French: [luh mil-yuh]) "the underworld") / The French Mob: a general term for criminal organizations in France
- Mafia-type criminal organizations (e.g. the Corsican mafia): a criminal network composed of crime families
- Gangs (e.g. Rédoine Faïd gang, Gang des postiches): a smaller criminal group with a soft hierarchy
- Crime families (e.g. Carbone crime family): a subset of a mafia-type organization that executes orders and/or missions

== Activities and strategies ==
According to a 2004 study on organized crime, the activities of criminals within the French underworld typically fall into three broad categories:

- Wholly illegal activity: criminal activities that are blatantly and duly illegal e.g. racketeering, kidnapping, armed robbery, trafficking, assault, etc.
- Associative illegal activity: criminal activities associated with their main wholly illegal activities e.g. bribery, corruption of police officials, tax fraud, grand theft auto, etc.
- Legal activity: activities used to cover up illegal activities e.g. operating a business for money laundering purposes, running gambling machines, restaurants, etc.

== History ==
=== Origins: 1910s to 1920s ===
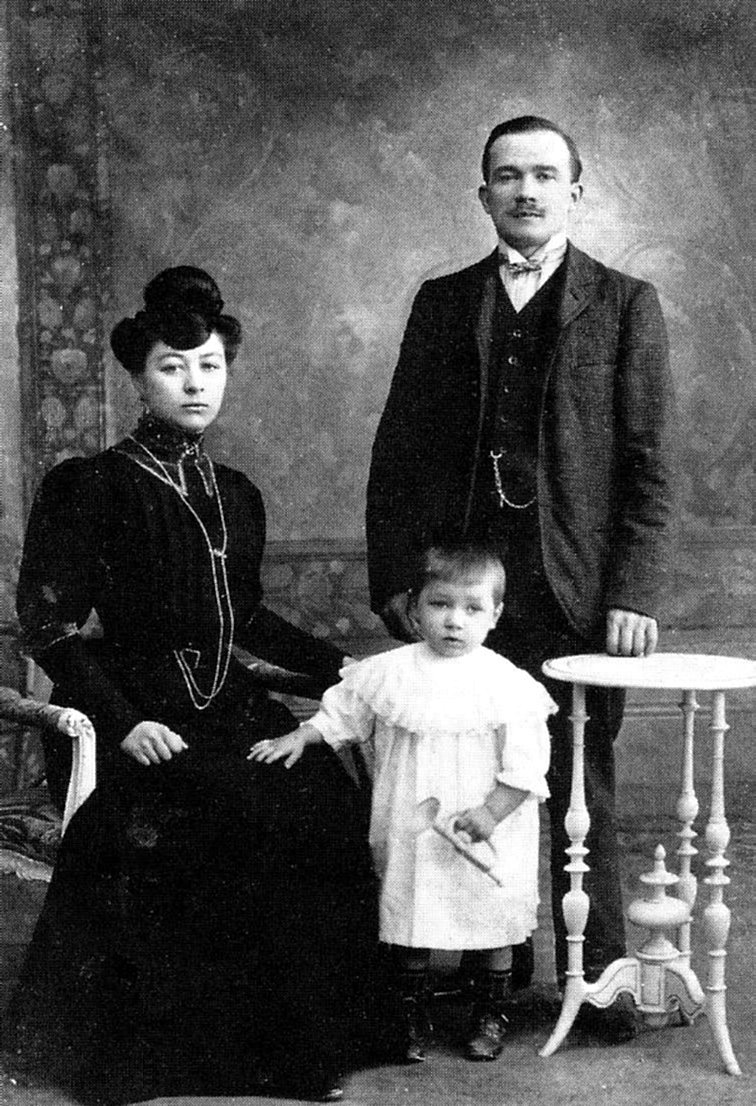
Jules Bonnot (upper right) founded the Bonnot Gang in 1911.

The history of organized crime in France can be traced to the French Revolution (1789 to 1799). It is however with the turn of the 20th century that local mobsters became highly organized and created crime families. During the 1910s and the 1920s, Pigalle and Rue Saint-Denis (in Paris) served as a hub for prostitution. Due to decentralized political control in Corsica during the 1900s, many criminal organizations flourished. Members of these gangs moved from the island of Corsica to the southern coasts of France during the early 20th century. From 1920 to 1930, prostitution was the most important criminal activity and was controlled in Marseille by the Corsican Godfather, Paul Carbone and the Italian-French Godfather, François Spirito. In Paris, the Pigalle area were fought over by Corsican godfathers such as Jean-Paul Stefani and Ange Saliceti.

=== "French Connection": 1930s to 1970s ===
During the 1940s and 1950s, many gangs — most notably the Tractions Avant gang – committed large scale bank robberies. During the 1970s, the most powerful gang in Paris was the Zemmour crime family, a Jewish/pied noir clan. The Zemmour brothers controlled prostitution in the French capital and were considered to be Godfathers of Paris. As prostitution decreased, criminal activities turned to more white-collar crimes. In 1930, the two godfathers (Carbone and Spirito) spearheaded the French Connection, a global heroin-smuggling ring reaching its peak in the 1960s and 1970s. Drugs were smuggled from Turkey to France and then to the United States through Canada. The French Connection was guided by various crime families into the late 1970s before it was disbanded by French authorities. The "Milieu of Marseille" (i.e. "the underworld of Marseille") was left without political leadership after the French Connection was destroyed. The Unione Corse established widespread infrastructure in the 1930s and helped guide the Milieu out of the French Connection era.

=== "The Godfathers": 1980s ===
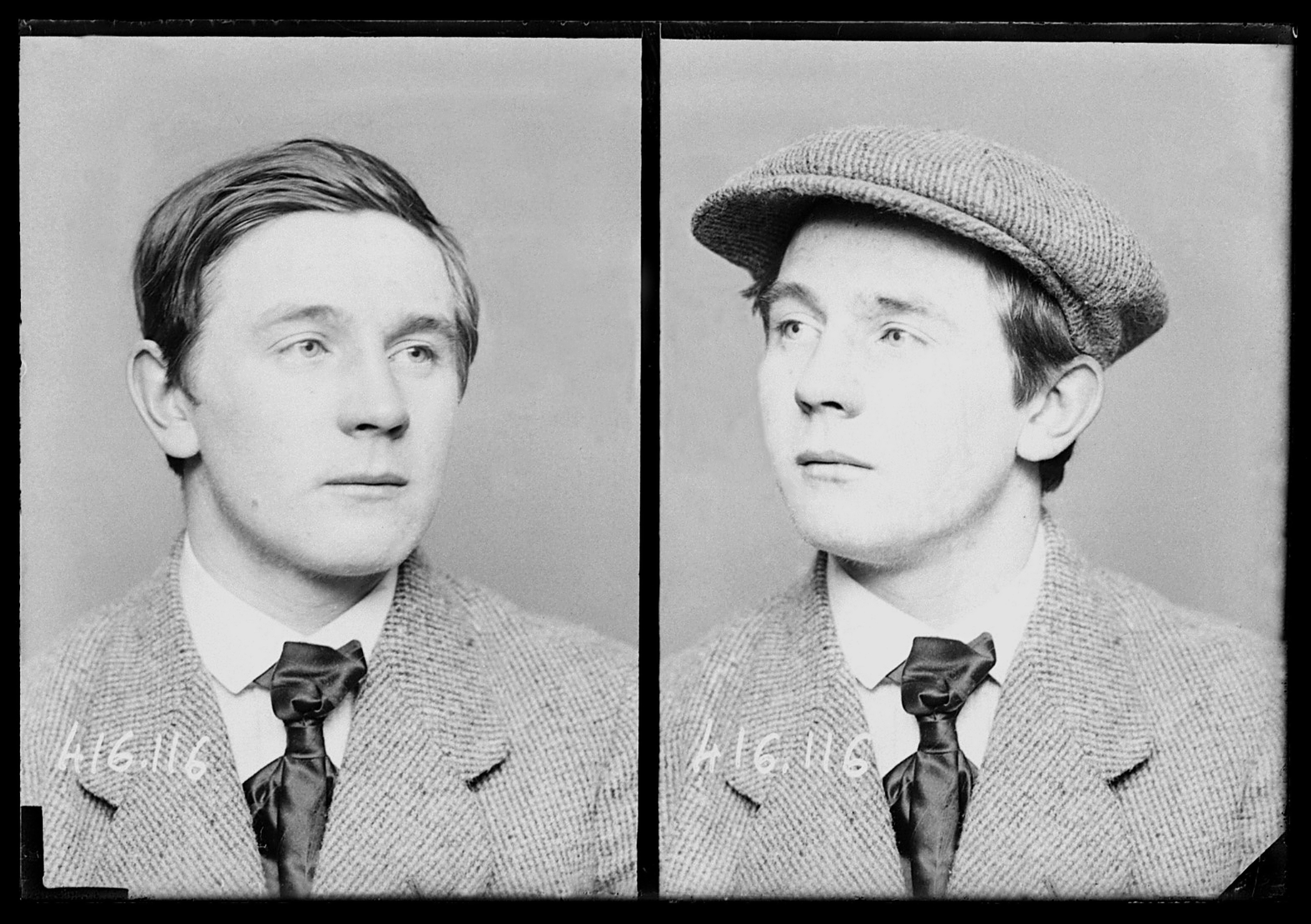
Raymond Callemin was a prominent member of the Bonnot Gang; he was executed by guillotine.

During the 1980s, many "godfathers" (e.g. Tany Zampa, Jacky Imbert, and Francis Vanverberghe) fought for control over racketeering and drug trafficking in the port area of Marseille. It was during this time that the Zemmour brothers, known as "The Godfathers of Paris," were killed. Claude Genova quickly assumed the gap the brothers left and continued running low-level prostitution rings until his 1994 assassination. The Gang des postiches robbed nearly 30 banks during their run from 1981 to 1986. Claude Genova's connections and infrastructure was overtaken by the Hornec brothers in 1994.

=== Push to extortion: 1990–2000 ===
At the start of the 1990s, cities were split up by families or "godfathers" (parrains). Larger cities, however, were fractured into various "mouvances" (territories). Many of these crime families established complex extortion rings in Marseille extending to Aix-en-Provence and the greater French Riviera.

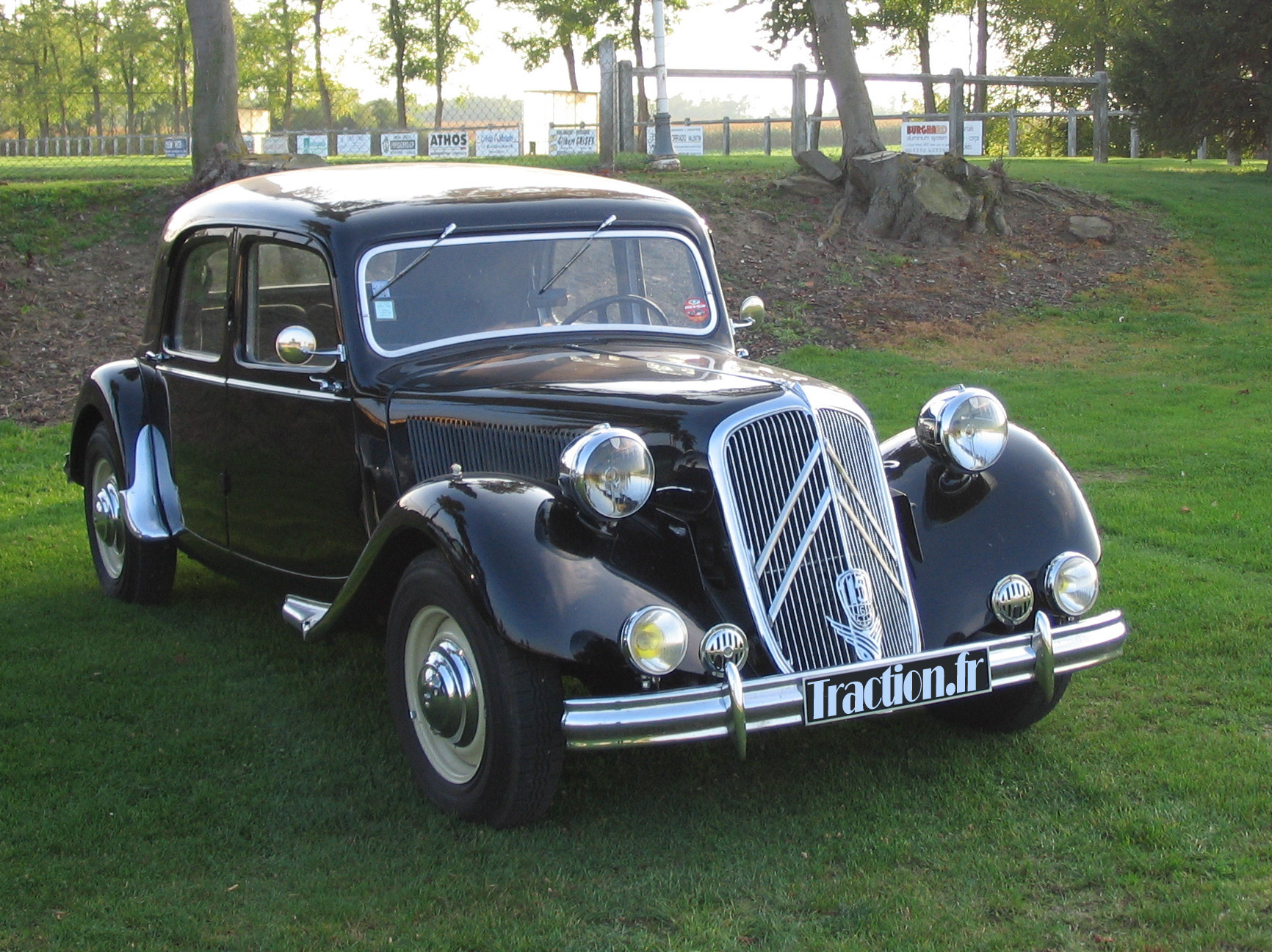
The Citroën Traction Avant was the preferred vehicle of the French mob, the Gang des Tractions Avant (1910s to 1950s).

The Rédoine Faïd gang, during the mid-1990s committed armed robbery, jewel theft, and extortion in the Paris area. The leader of the gang, Rédoine Faïd, was arrested in 2011. He broke out of prison on 13 April 2013 with a staged bombing and fled, but was captured on 29 May 2013.

=== Revitalization: 2000–present ===
Minority members of French society are being lured into crime families as a way of "fitting in". Low economic growth in the south of France is also leading youth to join the ranks as drug mules to gain an income alternative. An increase in youth-centered gang activity lead to the separation of the Milieu. Since the 1990s, the French Corsican mafia (Milieu corso-marseillais has encompassed the newer, modern criminals in an effort to distinguish them from the "traditional Milieu" (1930s to 1980s).

In the early 2000s, minorities (notably French Maghrebis: Algerians, Tunisians and Moroccans) living in impoverished suburbs participate in the construction of new criminal networks, not as hierarchical and centralized as gangs, but involved in different types of trafficking, particularly drug trafficking. These networks are built into neighborhoods, and their location and the semi-organized nature their crimes make them difficult to identify and dismantle.

Inter-gang fighting led to a spike in murder rates on Corsica in 2008. In 2010, The "Venzolasca Gang" penetrated large amounts of territory previously occupied by the Brise de Mer Gang.

In 2011, it was reported that various North African gangs had moved to the suburbs of Paris to sell crack cocaine. Members of these gangs introduced heroin and pure cocaine to their business operations in 2015. On 18 October 2011, a large holding of art was stolen from the Musée des Beaux-Arts in Ajaccio, Corsica, by the Valinco, Brise de Mer, and Venzolasca gangs.

In 2014, there was also an influx of "Voyageurs" or "Traveller" gangs in Paris, Marseille, Grenoble, and Montpellier. The most famous of them is the Hornec crime family; they regularly participate in robberies, extortion, drug trafficking, prostitution, and illegal slots machines. Their hubs of operation are in the Camargue and the Étang de Berre regions.

In 2023, a war erupted in Marseille between the Yoda and DZ Mafia gangs left 49 people dead and more than 120 injured.

== List of French mobs ==
The following list contains historical and contemporary renditions of organized crime groups originating and/or operating in France. Mobs that also serve as crime families are denoted accordingly.

†	Mob and crime family

Name	Location	Activities	Known Status
Gang des postiches	Paris	bank robberies	1981 and 1986
Bonnot Gang†	All major cities	racketeering	1911 to 1912
Gang des Tractions Avant	Paris	bank robberies	1915 to 1950s
Bande des Trois Canards	Marseille	burglaries, hold-ups and racketeering	1950 to 1965
Rédoine Faïd gang†	Paris	armed robbery, jewel theft, and extortion	1990 to 2013
Hornec gang†	Paris	racketeering, drug dealing, illegal slot machines	1980–present
Unione Corse (not the name of a gang but rather a nickname given by the US press to the complex network of gangsters of Corsican and/or Marseillaise origin that were party to the French Connection and were protected by French authorities between 1945 and the 1970s)	Marseille	racketeering, drug dealing, extortion, bank robbery	1945-1970s
Gang de la Brise de Mer	Corsica	racketeering, drug dealing, extortion, bank robbery	1970s–present
Venzolasca Gang	Corsica	racketeering, drug dealing, extortion	1990s–present
Valinco Gang	Valinco	extortion	1970s-1985
La bande du Petit Bar	Ajaccio	extortion, drug trafficking	2000s–present

== List of crime families ==
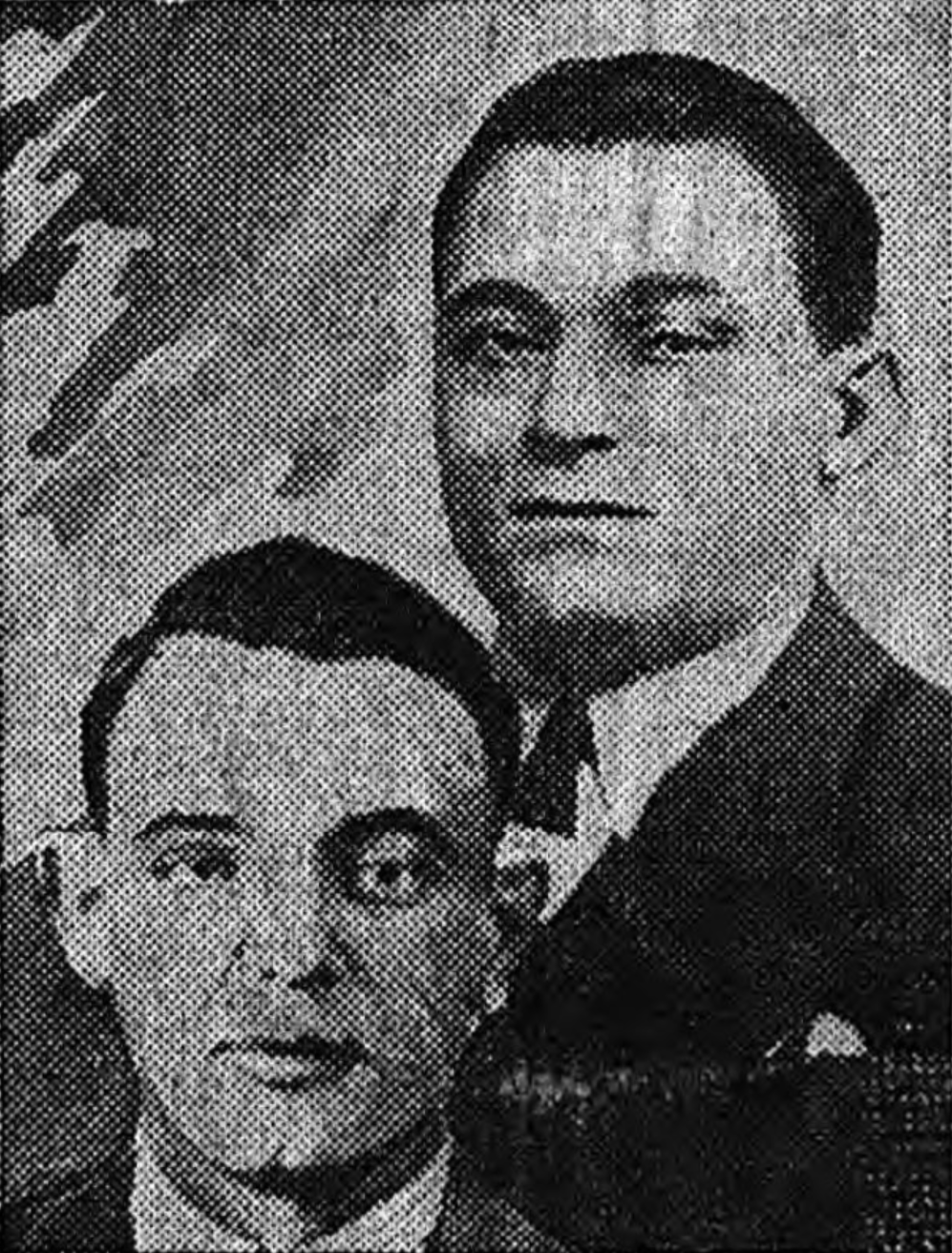
Paul Carbone (upper right) and François Spirito of the Carbone crime family

Crime families in France are smaller units of mobs, (i.e. a crime syndicate) which are in-turn either smaller units of a mafia group or the general Milieu. Alternately the phrase "crime family" could also mean the entirety of a mob, if it is small enough. The following list encompasses groups that are solely crime families and do not double as French mobs:

- Corsican mafia
  - Unione Corse (Marseille, French Riviera, France and Ajaccio, Bastia, Corsica)
    - Francisci crime family (defunct)
    - Guerini crime family (defunct)
    - Orsini crime family (defunct)
    - Venturi crime family (defunct)
    - Carbone crime family (defunct)
    - Sarti crime family (defunct)
    - Mondoloni crime family (defunct)
    - Barbieri crime family (Toulon-based) (defunct)
    - Barresi crime family (defunct)
    - Campanella crime family (defunct)
  - Brise de mer gang (Bastia, northern Corsica and France)
    - Mariani crime family
    - Casanova crime family
    - Guazzelli crime family
    - Patacchini crime family
  - Venzolasca Gang
    - Federici crime family
  - Colonna crime family (Ajaccio , southern Corsica) (defunct)
    - Petit Bar Gang
- Traveler families
  - Hornec crime family
- Other major groups
  - Perletto crime family (defunct)
  - Zampa crime family (defunct)
  - Zemmour crime family (defunct)

== In popular culture ==
- On Her Majesty's Secret Service (1963), James Bond novel and film (1969), wherein a character heads the French Mafia and is of Corsican descent.
- The French Connection (1971), American film on the heroin trade, based on the book of that name
- Les Brigades du Tigre (2006), French crime film loosely based on le milieu
- In the film American Gangster (2007), the Corsican mafia attempt to murder Frank Lucas after he puts them out of business through his monopoly on the heroin trade in Harlem.
- A Prophet, 2009 French drama film centering on a petty criminal who rises in the Corsican mob
- 22 Bullets (2010), French film based on the leader of the Bande des Trois Canards, Jacky Imbert

== See also ==
- Joël Soudron
- Crime in France
- Corsican mafia
- Sicilian Mafia
- Russian mafia
- Greek mafia
- Countesses of the Gestapo
- Black market in wartime France
- Henri Lafont
- Joseph Joanovici
- Pierre Bonny
- Illa Meery
- 93, rue Lauriston
- Il était une fois en France
