= Countesses of the Gestapo =

Parisian female Gestapo agents

The countesses of the Gestapo (French: Les comtesses de la Gestapo) were elite adventuresses of the Paris demimonde protected by the French Gestapo and large-scale black marketeers during the German occupation of France. The Gestapo countesses led extravagant lives despite the misery prevalent in Vichy France at the time. They were French or foreign former actresses or runway models, sometimes in fact truly aristocratic, who engaged in a variety of lucrative practices such as the confiscation of Jewish assets, espionage or black market operations.

== Countess Mara Tchernycheff ==
An actress known by her stage name, Illa Meery, Tchernycheff in 1934 was one of several pretty girls with improbable names, displaying her tanned curves and platinum blondness as an extra in a soft-porn pot-boiler filmed on the Cote d'Azur, Les aventure du roi Pausole, based on the novel by Pierre Louys. She later appeared topless in Zouzou as a foil to années folles sensation Josephine Baker.

Zouzou is a French film by Marc Allégret released in 1934. Josephine Baker plays the title character.

It was shot at the Joinville Studios in Paris, with sets designed by the art directors Lazare Meerson and Alexandre Trauner.

A Russian countess, Tchernycheff ran a black market network specializing in cognac and fine wine, and moved shared an apartment with a homosexual socialite from Odessa named Vladimir Barjansky, intimate friend of Philippe de Rothschild. Barjanski, an illustrator known for his movie posters, fled to Hollywood after French police wrongly accused him of being a spy.

She married a gambler named Garat and spent some time with him on the beaches of Brazil. But she had an affair and he left her. When she returned to France her former allies had all left for safer places. But other Russian emigres whispered of fortunes to be made selling to the Germans, who were on a monumental buying spree with the "occupation costs" extracted from the Vichy government. Paul Metchersky, Andre Galitzine and Yvan Shapochnikoff were rich now, the whispers said, Soumarakoff, Lazare Mailoff and Michel Szkolnikoff. She joined a salon on avenue Iena and then at the George V hotel made up of entrepreneurs who had no objection to supplying the German war effort, since these former aristocrats were in favor of the Germans taking care of the Soviets for them and perhaps making it possible for them to return to past glories. The Germans did business at what were known as bureaux d'achat, known as Amt Otto, Pimetex, ZKW or SS-Essex, where she ran across old friends and former accomplices such as Stephan Djanoumoff, Serge Landchewsky, Boris Ivanowski and the Baron of Osten-Sacken.

She became the mistress of Henri Lafont, who ran the Paris underworld with the help of the French police.

As the mistress of Hans Leimer, an SS officer tasked with shipping requisitioned artwork and other goods to Germany, she was arrested in July 1944 by the Gestapo, and her lover was sent to the Russian front. She herself was sent to Germany to be judged in Berlin.

== Princess Euphrosine Mourousi ==
Princess Euphrosine Mourousi, a Greek addict who trafficked in cigarettes and informed on Jewish and Russian émigré families, was sentenced in 1950 to three years in prison and 20 years of banishment from France for informing to both the French police and the Gestapo about several Russian Jews. Her son Yves became a well-known French journalist.

== Others ==
- Marquise de San Carlos de Pedroso (née María Angustias Núñez del Prado), an early Spanish supporter of Franco
- Countess von Seckendorff (born Hildegard von Reth in 1907), a German aristocrat by marriage who spied on Parisian high society. Died 1989 in Britain.
- Countess Marie Olinska (pseudonym of Frenchwoman Sonia Irène Blache), heroin addict and minor film actress who appeared in The Wolf of the Malveneurs
- Marquise d'Abrantès (née Sylviane Quimfe, but an authentic marquise after her marriage to the marquis Maurice Le Ray d'Abrantès, whom she met at the brothel where she worked). Frenchwoman and courtesan, she was introduced to rue Lauriston by Lionel de Wiet. She needed a pass to return to the zone libre and her title, her furs and her jewels made an impression on the members of the Carlingue at dinner that night. Lafont's driver Pagnon was there as well as Edmond Delehaye, Louis Estebesteguy, and Pierre Bonny, in addition to Lafont. She claimed a she'd had liaison with the prince of Monaco, but Pagnon recognized her and let Lafont know about the lady's past.
- Baroness de Beaufort (pseudonym of Olla Lemesle)
- Countess de Thucé (Madame Hubert)

Most of these women were not prosecuted after the Liberation of France.

== See also ==
- Horizontal collaboration
- Joseph Joanovici
- Henri Lafont
- Pierre Bonny
- Cocotte
- Police collaboration in Vichy France
- Marga d’Andurain - smuggler involved with black market artworks in World War II

== Bibliography ==
- Grégory Auda (2002). Les belles années du "milieu", 1940-1944: le grand banditisme dans la machine répressive allemande en France (in French). Paris: Éditions Michalon. p. 254. ISBN 2-84186-164-3. OCLC 50493997. Reissued:
  - Grégory Auda (2013). Les belles années du "milieu', 1940-1944: le grand banditisme dans la machine répressive allemande en France (in French). Paris: Éditions Michalon. p. 253. ISBN 978-2-84186-678-6.
- Philippe Aziz (1972). Au service de l'ennemi: la Gestapo française en province 1940-1944. Paris: Fayard. p. 186. ISBN 978-2-7062-1194-2. OCLC 4173712.
- Philippe Aziz (1973). Tu trahiras sans vergogne: histoire de deux collabos, Bonny et Lafont. Paris: Livre de poche. p. 379. OCLC 1206738.
- Jean-Marc Berlière (2018). Polices des temps noirs: France, 1939-194 (in French). Paris: Perrin. p. 1357. ISBN 978-2-262-03561-7.
- Luc Briand (2022). Alexandre Villaplane, capitaine des Bleus et officier nazi (in French). Paris: Plein Jour. p. 271. ISBN 978-2-370-67074-8. OCLC 723952731.
- Jacques Delarue (1993). Trafics et crimes sous l'Occupation: collection Grands documents contemporains. Paris: Fayard. p. 496. ISBN 978-2-21303-154-5. OCLC 722598561.
- Cyril Eder (2006). Les Comtesses de la Gestapo (in French). Paris: Grasset. p. 257. ISBN 978-2-246-67401-6. OCLC 723952731.
- Serge Jacquemard (1992). La bande Bonny-Lafont. Paris: Fleuve noir. p. 217. ISBN 978-2-265-04673-3. OCLC 40382542.
- Jean-François Miniac (2009). Les Grandes Affaires criminelles du Doubs. Romagnat: De Borée. p. 362. ISBN 978-2-84494-959-2. OCLC 690431283. (about Roger Griveau)
- Christopher Othen (2020). The King of Nazi Paris: Henri Lafont and the Gangsters of the French Gestapo. London: Biteback Publishing. ISBN 978-1-78590-592-6
- Patrice Rolli, La Phalange nord-africaine (ou Brigade nord-africaine, ou Légion nord-africaine) en Dordogne: Histoire d'une alliance entre la Pègre et la Gestapo; 15 March-19 August 1944, Éditions l'Histoire en Partage, 2013, 189 pages (mostly about Alexandre Villaplane and Raymond Monange)
- Alex Kershaw (2015). Avenue of Spies: A True Story of Terror, Espionage, and One American Family's Heroic Resistance in Nazi-Occupied Paris. Crown/Archetype. ISBN 978-0-8041-4004-1.
