= Norman Ginzberg =

French writer

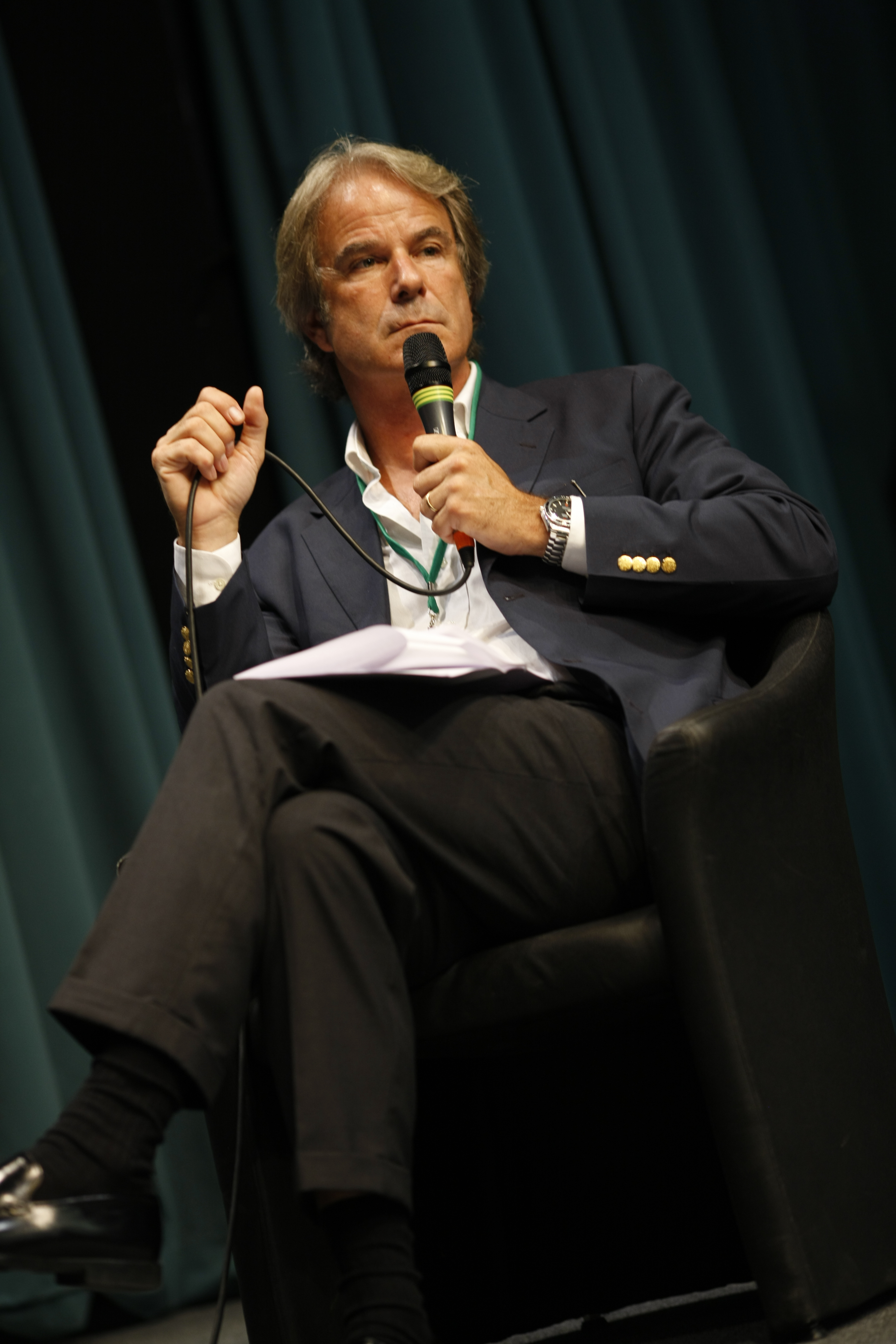
Jean-Christophe Giesbert in 2009

Jean-Christophe Giesbert (born March 21, 1956, in Elbeuf France), is a French writer using the pen name Norman Ginzberg.

He is the brother of Franz-Olivier Giesbert.

His father was an American soldier who disembarked on D-Day at Omaha Beach. He made his career in journalism, before turning to communications consultancy. He lives in le Gers.

His books include Les captives de la Vallee de Zion, Omaha and Arizona Tom.
