= Lake of Ladies =

- Directed by: Marc Allégret
- Written by: Vicki Baum (novel); Colette; Marc Allégret; Jean-Georges Auriol
- Starring: Rosine Deréan; Simone Simon; Illa Meery
- Cinematography: Jules Kruger
- Edited by: Denise Batcheff; Yvonne Martin
- Music by: Georges Auric
- Production company: Société Parisienne de Production
- Distributed by: Tobis Films
- Release date: 18 May 1934
- Running time: 106 minutes
- Country: France
- Language: French

Lake of Ladies or Ladies Lake (French: Lac aux dames) is a 1934 French drama film directed by Marc Allégret and starring Rosine Deréan, Simone Simon and Illa Meery.

The film's sets were designed by the art director Lazare Meerson. It is based on a novel by Vicki Baum. It was released by the French branch of Tobis Film.

== Cast ==
- Rosine Deréan as Danny Lyssenhop
- Simone Simon as Puck
- Illa Meery as Anika
- Odette Joyeux as Carla Lyssenhop
- Maroulka as Vefi
- Jean-Pierre Aumont as Eric Heller
- Vladimir Sokoloff as Baron Dobbersberg
- Maurice Rémy Le comte Stereny
- Paul Asselin as Brindel
- Romain Bouquet as L'aubergiste
- Eugène Dumas as Matz
- Michel Simon as Oscar Lyssenhop
- Anthony Gildès
- Germaine Reuver

== See also ==
- The Three Women of Urban Hell (1928)

== Bibliography ==
- Bergfelder, Tim & Harris, Sue & Street, Sarah. Film Architecture and the Transnational Imagination: Set Design in 1930s European Cinema. Amsterdam University Press, 2007.
