= Illa Meery =

French actress (1915–2010)

- Born: Mara Chernyshev-Bezobrazov; 16 May 1915; Moscow, Russian Empire
- Died: October 2010 (aged 95); Southampton, New York, United States
- Occupations: Actress, singer
- Years active: 1928–1935 (film)

Illa Meery (16 May 1915 – October 2010) was a Russian-born French adventuress, singer, film actress and possibly Soviet spy who became involved in the French black market under German occupation.

== Émigrée ==
She was the daughter of count Alexandre Alexandrovitch Tchernychev-Bezobrazov and Marie Nicolaïevna née Chtcherbatova. She arrived in France in 1919 with her parents and older brother as refugees from the October Revolution, first in Marseille, then Paris. She attended the Russian school in rue Daru.

== Film actress and Chanel model ==
She appeared in several early French films in the 1920s, notably in Zouzou as Barbara, the topless foil for Années folles sensation Josephine Baker, who in that film became the first black woman to star in a French feature film. She later became a model for Chanel, then Schiaparelli. At that time she was living with the painter Vladimir Barjansky, a friend of Philippe de Rothschild. She became his mistress and he got her a part in the film Lac aux dames (Lake of Ladies), a film he financed, based on a screenplay by Colette and directed by André Gide's former lover Marc Allégret.

Later she met professional crook Joseph Goldstein a.k.a. Dorélis. They became a couple and she was soon threatened with expulsion as a stateless person holding a Nansen passport. On 19 July 1939 she married the actor Henri Garat. In 1940, the couple took refuge in Brazil and lounged on the beach there ith the exiled Carol I of Romania.

== Mobsters and Nazis ==
On her return to France in 1942, she developed ties with the Occupation authorities and black market figures, and was associated with various scandals under the name of Madame Garat. She became the mistress of Henri Lafont, head of the French Gestapo, and was one of the women known as the Countesses of the Gestapo. She had many affairs with German officers, notably with members of the SD.

As the mistress of Hans Leimer, an SS officer tasked with shipping requisitioned artwork and other goods to Germany, she was arrested in July 1944 by the Gestapo, and her lover was sent to the Russian front. She herself was sent to Germany to be judged in Berlin.

== Fourth Republic criminal justice ==
Arrested by the Americans in May 1945, she was returned to French authorities and imprisoned in Fresnes on 6 September. On 5 June 1945, she was sentenced by the tribunal de la Seine to two years in prison and the confiscation of one third of her assets. She was also sued in the civil courts by someone who said she had appropriated assets, in litigation that went on for years.

She claimed to have been a Soviet agent since 1935 and to have penetrated German counterintelligence around 1942, but no evidence was found to support this.

== Selected filmography ==
- Princess Olala (1928) as Hedy
- The Abduction of the Sabine Women (1928) as Ria, a showgirl
- Cagliostro (1929) as Jeanne de la Motte
- Lake of Ladies (1934) as Anika
- Zouzou as Barbara (1934)

== Bibliography ==
- Chandler, Charlotte. Marlene: Marlene Dietrich, A Personal Biography. Simon and Schuster, 2011.
- Grégory Auda (2002). Les belles années du "milieu", 1940–1944: le grand banditisme dans la machine répressive allemande en France (in French). Paris: Éditions Michalon. p. 254. ISBN 2-84186-164-3. OCLC 50493997. Reissued:
  - Grégory Auda (2013). Les belles années du "milieu', 1940–1944: le grand banditisme dans la machine répressive allemande en France (in French). Paris: Éditions Michalon. p. 253. ISBN 978-2-84186-678-6.
- Philippe Aziz (1972). Au service de l'ennemi: la Gestapo française en province 1940–1944. Paris: Fayard. p. 186. OCLC 4173712.
- Philippe Aziz. Tu trahiras sans vergogne: histoire de deux collabos, Bonny et Lafont. Paris: Livre de poche. p. 379. OCLC 1206738.
- Jean-Marc Berlière (2018). Polices des temps noirs: France, 1939–1945 (in French). Paris: Perrin. p. 1357. ISBN 978-2-262-03561-7.
- Luc Briand (2022). Alexandre Villaplane, capitaine des Bleus et officier nazi (in French). Paris: Plein Jour. p. 271. ISBN 978-2-370-67074-8. OCLC 723952731.
- Jacques Delarue (1993). Trafics et crimes sous l'Occupation. Paris: Fayard. p. 496. ISBN 978-2-21303-154-5. OCLC 722598561.
- Cyril Eder (2006). Les Comtesses de la Gestapo (in French). Paris: Grasset. p. 257. ISBN 978-2-246-67401-6. OCLC 723952731.
- Serge Jacquemard (1992). La bande Bonny-Lafont. Paris: Fleuve noir. p. 217. ISBN 978-2-265-04673-3. OCLC 40382542.
- Jean-François Miniac (2009). Les Grandes Affaires criminelles du Doubs. Romagnat: De Borée. p. 362. ISBN 978-2-84494-959-2. OCLC 690431283. (about Roger Griveau)
- Patrice Rolli, La Phalange nord-africaine (ou Brigade nord-africaine, ou Légion nord-africaine) en Dordogne: Histoire d'une alliance entre la Pègre et la Gestapo; 15 March–19 August 1944, Éditions l'Histoire en Partage, 2013, 189 pages (mostly about Alexandre Villaplane and Raymond Monange)
