= Denise Batcheff =

French film editor and sound technician

Denise Tual (née Piazza; 15 May 1906 – 23 November 2000), known as Denise Batcheff, was a French film editor and sound technician in the early 1930s.

She worked on nine films:

- Black and White (1931)
- Amour à l'américaine (1931) also known as American Love (USA)
- La Chienne (1931) (sound editor), directed by Jean Renoir
- Fantômas (1932), directed by Paul Fejos'
- La Dame chez Maxim's (1933)
- Lac aux dames (1934) also known as Lake of Ladies (USA)
- L'Hôtel du libre échange (1934)
- Zouzou (1934) (as D. Batcheff)
- Les Beaux jours (1935)

She was married to Pierre Batcheff (1901–1932), a French actor whose most famous film was Un chien andalou (1929) by Luis Buñuel and Salvador Dalí.
