= HMS Redoubtable =

Ships in the British Royal Navy:

- HMS Redoubtable (1815), a third rate ship of the line launched in 1815, broken up in 1841
- HMS Redoubtable (1892), launched in 1892 as the pre-dreadnought battleship HMS Revenge, renamed in 1915, scrapped in 1919

Ships in the French Navy:

- French ship Redoutable

== See also ==
- Redoubtable (film), a 2017 film
