= 22 Bullets =

- Film poster
- Directed by: Richard Berry
- Screenplay by: Éric Assous; Richard Berry
- Based on: L'Immortel by Franz-Olivier Giesbert
- Produced by: Luc Besson; Pierre-Ange Le Pogam
- Starring: Jean Reno; Kad Merad; Richard Berry; Marina Foïs; Jean-Pierre Darroussin
- Cinematography: Thomas Hardmeier
- Edited by: Camille Delamarre
- Music by: Klaus Badelt
- Production companies: EuropaCorp; TF1 Films Production; Marie Coline Films; SMTS; Canal+ CinéCinéma; Sofica Europacorp
- Distributed by: EuropaCorp Distribution
- Release date: 24 March 2010
- Running time: 115 minutes
- Country: France
- Language: French
- Budget: $20 million
- Box office: $21.7 million

22 Bullets (French: L'Immortel) is a 2010 French gangster-action film directed by Richard Berry. It tells a part of the life story of Jacky Imbert, and is based on the novel L'Immortel (2007) by Franz-Olivier Giesbert. Filming began on 23 February 2009 in Marseille, in Avignon in early April 2009, and continued for 8 weeks in Paris.

== Plot ==
Three years prior to the start of the film, mafia boss Charly Matteï retired. He left the business to his old friend Tony Zacchia.

He lives a peaceful life, devoted to his wife and two children. His past catches up with him when he is ambushed by an eight-man hit squad in a parking lot who kill his dog and leave him for dead with 22 bullets in his body. Against all odds, he survives to take revenge on his killers.

On the hunt for the shooters, he is confronted with his criminal past and threats to his family. He tries to identify those responsible without bloodshed. This "weakness" is exploited, and his friend Karim is murdered by the people who shot him. Matteï swears revenge and goes on a hunt for the masterminds of the attack. He visits the hit squad during a birthday celebration and announces that he will kill each of them randomly at a time of his choosing.

Marie Goldman is the policewoman investigating the shooting in the parking lot. Her husband, who was also a policeman, was killed in the service but his killer was never caught. Despite the indifference of her superiors, she would like to clear up the murder of her husband. Towards the end of the movie, in order to save his kidnapped son, a desperate Matteï makes a deal with Goldman, who herself is divided between doing her duty and punishing the murderers of her husband, who she suspects were Zacchia's men. The police get a USB drive containing data incriminating Zacchia in a money fraud and laundering operation. Matteï rescues his son and then finally confronts Tony Zacchia at his home, but Zachia turns the tables and is about to kill Matteï when the police interrupt and arrest both.

In the end, Matteï is released as the cops do not have enough evidence to charge him. Goldman had earlier revealed to Matteï that one of the 8 shooters had missed him on purpose in the shootout at the start of the movie. Matteï figures out that this eighth shooter was his friend and lawyer who had been forced by Zacchia into shooting Matteï. He is forgiven by Matteï and the movie ends with Matteï walking with his family on a beach. His voiceover tells the audience that he had left his past life behind him and all he wanted to do was spend whatever possible time he had left with his family. He also says that he will no more have to look over his shoulder as he is at peace with his past.

== Cast ==
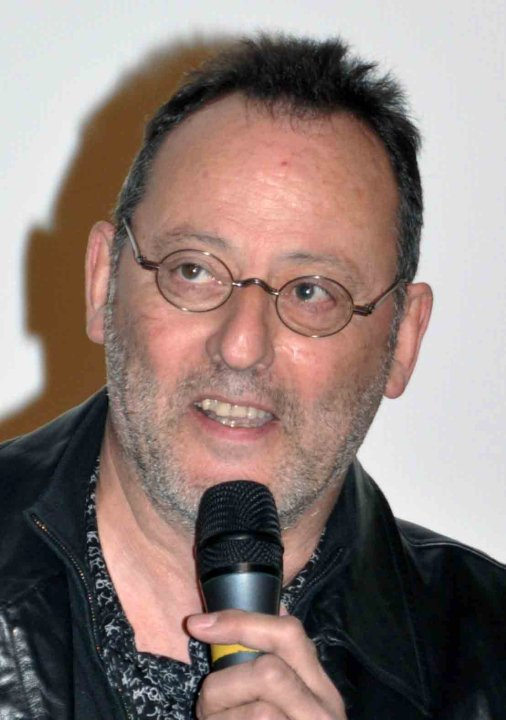
Reno at the premiere of the film

- Jean Reno - Charly Matteï
- Kad Merad - Tony Zacchia
- Jean-Pierre Darroussin - Martin Beaudinard
- Marina Foïs - Marie Goldman
- Joeystarr - Le pistachier
- Richard Berry - Aurelio Rampoli
- Venantino Venantini - Paduan
- Claude Gensac - Mme Fontarosa
- Joséphine Berry - Eva Matteï
- Max Baissette de Malglaive - Anatole Matteï
- Catherine Samie - Stella Matteï
- Moussa Maaskri - Karim
- Guillaume Gouix - The Morvelous jr.
- Christian Mazzuchini as Bastien Paolini
