= Hornec gang =

Organized crime group

- Founding location: Paris
- Territory: France
- Ethnicity: Predominantly French Traveller (French Romanis) and French Maghrebis (Algerian, Moroccan and Tunisian)
- Membership: 30-50 members and associates
- Criminal activities: Armed robbery, drug trafficking, prostitution, murder, gambling
- Allies: Corsican mafia

The Hornec brothers gang, also called "the H", "the Montreuil gang" or Hornec family, is a Gitanes criminal group from the region of Paris. It is the most influential gang in the French capital. They control many criminal activities (racket, drug dealing, illegal slot machines) in the Parisian region, and they have also good connections with the Corsican mafia, and the Maghrebian gangs.

The Hornec clan is led by three brothers, born in the Parisian suburb city of Montreuil. They took the succession of the crime boss, Claude Genova, after his assassination in 1994. Then, the "H" gang has got a great ascension. They invested money from hold-ups in night-clubs, illegal slots machines and prostitution bars, they recruited in the gang many young boys from the suburb's ghettos, principally gipsys and maghrebians, and became the most important gang of Paris.

The Hornec brothers had invested in building speculation in Paris, they also invested in a luxury villa in the French Riviera.

Since 2006, when several members of the gang were arrested, the gang is less influential than during the 1990s and the early 2000s.

== See also ==
- Organized crime in France
