= Zouzou (film) =

- Theatrical release poster
- Directed by: Marc Allégret
- Written by: Carlo Rim
- Produced by: Arys Nissotti
- Starring: Josephine Baker; Jean Gabin
- Cinematography: Michel Kelber; Jacques Mercanton
- Edited by: Denise Batcheff
- Music by: Vincent Scotto; Georges Van Parys; Alain Romans
- Production companies: Les Films H. Roussillon; Productions Arys
- Distributed by: Corona Films
- Release date: 1934
- Running time: 85 minutes
- Country: France
- Language: French

Zouzou is a French film by Marc Allégret released in 1934. Josephine Baker plays the title character.

It was shot at the Joinville Studios in Paris, with sets designed by the art directors Lazare Meerson and Alexandre Trauner.

== Plot ==
Zouzou and Jean are presented in the Cirque Romarin, a traveling circus, as 10-year-old twins: she's dark, he's light. Père (Papa) Melé adopted them after their fathers—both performers in the circus—died. Cut to Manila. Jean has become a sailor, with at least one girl in every port. He writes to Zouzou, who lives in Toulon with Papa Melé, now that the circus has failed. The fleet returns and Jean, confined to quarters for a week, jumps ship in the middle of the night. In the brig, a friend tells him of work as an electrician in a music hall in Paris. Zouzou is very much in love with Jean, although he still thinks of her as his sister.

The family moves to Paris. Zouzou works at the laundry of the Widow Valée, where the young women gossip about customers and admire the beautiful lingerie worn by girls who work at the music hall. Zouzou entertains them by imitating the temperamental star, Barbara, who has little talent but all the support of her “gigolo”, M. de Saint-Lévy, who is a silent partner in the music hall. At rehearsal, Barbara sings “There's only one man in Paris for me…” badly.

Zouzou and Claire deliver laundry to the music hall and go dancing with Jean that night. A bully tries to force Zouzou to dance and Jean knocks him out. Zouzou is oblivious to the attraction between Jean and Claire. Claire eventually confesses her love for Jean to her mother: She is heartbroken because she loves Zouzou, Zouzou loves him so, and Jean does not believe it.

Barbara is late for rehearsal after oversleeping with her lover, who leaves that day for Brazil. Trompe, the manager of the music hall, despairs, believing the show will flop; meanwhile, the chorus girls persuade Zouzou to try on a costume, and all agree she looks beautiful. Jean uses her to adjust his spotlight, and while she is dancing for her own pleasure, raises the curtain. Trompe sees her and she flees. Meanwhile Jean helps Barbara to leave the theater and follow her lover. She kisses him in gratitude. Zouzou sees them and tells Claire.

As this is all happening, Papa Melé falls from the scaffolding and is brought home by friends. While they go for a doctor, he dies, with Zouzou beside him. She runs out into the streets, screaming in search of Jean, and witnesses a man named Julot shooting the bully Jean decked in the dancehall. Jean is accused after foolishly picking up the murder weapon, and the police ignore Zouzou. As a result, she needs money to mount his defense, and begs Trompe to put her on stage.

Cut to her opening night, which is a triumph. During her debut, she sees a newspaper photo of Julot, who has been arrested for a bank robbery. Though Josette (the dresser at the music hall) objects, she rushes to the police station to identify him incontrovertibly by the finger missing on his right hand, then gives her statement. The show goes on without her, with encores. She returns and performs the song about an unfaithful lover, “There is only one man in Paris for me...” that Barbara sang so badly earlier in the film.

Jean is released from jail, and Zouzou watches his reunion with Claire from a distance, then runs back to the theater. Cut to a paper hanger pasting a banner over the poster of her face. It reads “100e representation” (100th performance). Cut to Zouzou on stage, wistfully singing.

A curtain draws across the scene.

== Cast ==
- Josephine Baker as Zouzou, a Haitian orphan
- Jean Gabin as Jean, an orphan
- Pierre Larquey as Le Père Melé, aka Papa Melé, their adoptive father, ringmaster of the Cirque Romarin
- Claire Gerard as La Veuve (the widow) Vallée, owner of the laundry
- Yvette Lebon as Claire Vallée, daughter of Mme. Valée
- Illa Meery as Miss Barbara, star of the music hall, mistress of M. de Saint-Levy
- Madeleine Guitty as Josette, dresser at the music hall
- Marcel Vallée as M. Trompe, manager of the music-hall
- Teddy Michaud as Julot
- Pierre Palau as M. de Saint-Lévy, Barbara's protector, silent partner in the music hall
- Floyd DuPont (fr) (choreographer of the film) as the choreographer of the music hall
- Viviane Romance as the girl at the table
- Philippe Richard as the Police Commissioner
- Robert Seller as another silent partner in the music hall
- Roger Blin as a witness to the murder
- Georges Van Parys as the Pianist
- Eugène Stuber : a man at the dance hall
- Louis Wins : leader of the orchestra for the revue
- Irène Ascoua : Zouzou as a child
- Géo Forster : un boy in the revue
- Lucien Walter
- Émile Carrara
- Adrienne Trenkel
- Andrée Wendler
