= Rédoine Faïd =

French gangster

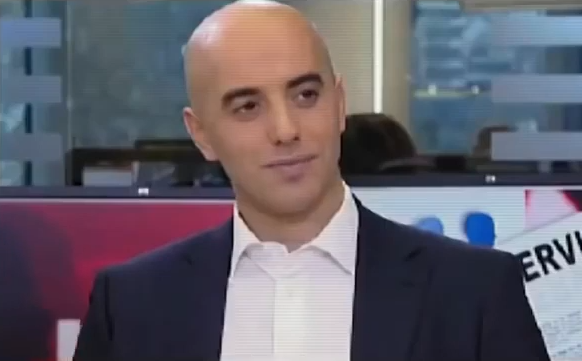
- Faïd on a talkshow in 2010
- Born: 10 May 1972 (age 54); Creil, France
- Occupation: Gangster
- Status: 2009 released on parole 2013 in prison
- Convictions: Armed robbery, bank theft, attempted prison break, breaking parole
- Penalty: 1998 sentenced 30 years 2005 sentenced 3 years 2011 sentenced 8 years 2013 pending
- Escaped: 13 April 2013 (first escape); 1 July 2018 (second escape)
- Escape end: 29 May 2013 (first escape); 3 October 2018 (second escape)

Rédoine Faïd ([ʁe.dwan fa.id]; born 10 May 1972) is a French writer, career criminal and serial jailbreaker who was considered France's most wanted criminal in 2013.

== Childhood ==
Faïd was born in Creil to Algerian immigrant parents who immigrated in 1969. He is the penultimate child of the family, and has 8 brothers and 3 sisters. Faïd's father was a worker in a chemical factory in Villers-Saint-Paul. In 1988, his father deserted his family and went back to Algeria to start a new life. In 1991, Faïd's mother died of leukemia. Faïd was 19 and already a delinquent when he joined forces with his brothers to commit crimes.

== Biography ==
In the mid-1990s, Faïd and Jean-Claude Bisel had led a criminal gang that was responsible for armed robbery, including robbing an armored truck containing cash, jewel theft, and extortion in the Paris area. In 1997, seven of eight accused were tried for said charges (the eighth having fled to Algeria). Faïd spent three years on the run in Switzerland and Israel before being arrested in 1998. In his autobiography, he claimed to have disguised himself as an Orthodox Jew and learned Hebrew while in Israel, and that he was taught firearms skills by an Israeli soldier. He was sentenced to 30 years in prison, but was released on parole after serving ten years.

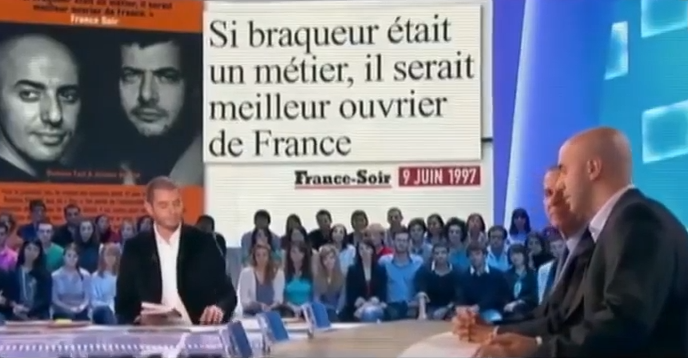
Faïd on a french talkshow in 2010, after publishing his book

In 2009 he wrote a book, Braqueur - Des cités au grand banditisme, (Robber - From the Projects to Organized Crime) about growing up in a life of crime in Paris' banlieues, and claimed to have given up a life of crime. However, he was the suspected mastermind of an armed robbery that claimed the life of a policewoman in 2010, and subsequently was caught after he broke parole conditions in 2011, which returned him to prison for eight years. Contra Mundum Press published an English translation of his book in 2020. Faïd escaped from prison in 2013 and 2018. For the first escape, he was sentenced to an additional 10 years, and for the second escape, he received an additional 14 years in prison. Together with his prior sentences for robberies of 25 and 28 years, this results in a minimum prison term ending 2060.

=== Prison escapes ===
==== 2013 ====
On the morning of 13 April 2013, he broke out of the Sequedin prison, using explosives to blast through five prison doors, holding four prison wardens hostage during the escape and employing the use of a getaway car driven by Sabri Trad, an ex-special forces officer. He then burned the car in Lille and left in another vehicle. The same day, a Europe-wide warrant was issued. Faïd was arrested again on 29 May 2013, in a B&B hotel in Pontault-Combault, Seine-et-Marne, France. Interpol stated that he had been trying to obtain forged documents to reach Israel.

==== 2018 ====
At around 11:30 am on 1 July 2018, Faïd was broken out of a prison in Réau with the help of three armed accomplices and a helicopter, an Aérospatiale Alouette II. An angle grinder was used to cut through the doors of the prison which allowed the accomplices to reach Faïd. The helicopter had been hijacked from a nearby airfield by criminals posing as flight school students. At gunpoint, the flying instructor was forced to participate in the escape, landing in a courtyard of the prison after flying through a gap in the anti helicopter wire. The helicopter was later found not far from Charles de Gaulle Airport, where it was believed he and the three men escaped by car, and the flight instructor released uninjured. French police focused primarily on a domestic manhunt, while also considering a potential lead that Faïd had fled abroad, with police cautioning that "beyond his charisma and aura, beyond the folklore, [Faïd] is a dangerous individual."

Three weeks following his escape, Faïd narrowly avoided recapture after being spotted by police near Paris. On 24 July 2018, police identified Faïd as one of two people inside a car observing a service station. As they moved in, the suspects fled towards Sarcelles and managed to get away. The car was later found abandoned in a car park with plastic explosives inside.

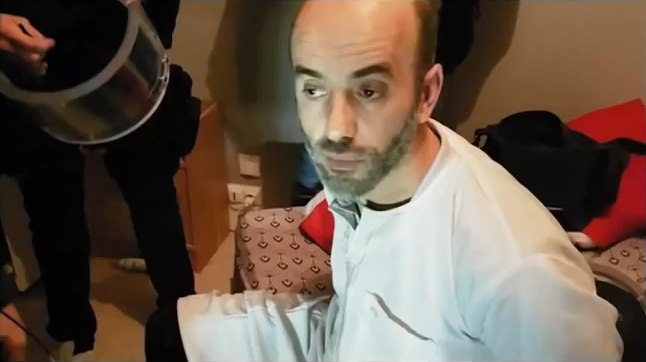
Arrest of Faïd on the 3rd October 2018, 4:20 am

Prior to being apprehended, Faïd used a face-covering Islamic veil (burqa) to move around in public spaces. Faïd was apprehended again in Creil on 3 October 2018, along with his brother and two other men. Weapons were seized during the police operation.

=== Media influence ===
Faïd has been influenced by American crime films such as Scarface, Reservoir Dogs and Heat. He once told Michael Mann, the director of Heat, at a film festival that "You were my technical adviser". Faïd has also been compared to French bank robber and serial prison escapee Jacques Mesrine (1936–1979), and has described Mesrine as one of his heroes.

== Works ==
- Rédoine Faïd, Braqueur: Des cités au grand banditisme (Paris: Manufacture de Livres, 2010)
- Rédoine Faïd, Outlaw: Author Armed & Dangerous (New York: Contra Mundum Press, 2020)

== See also ==
- Crime in France
- List of helicopter prison escapes
- List of prison escapes
