= Marga d'Andurain =

French adventurer and suspected criminal

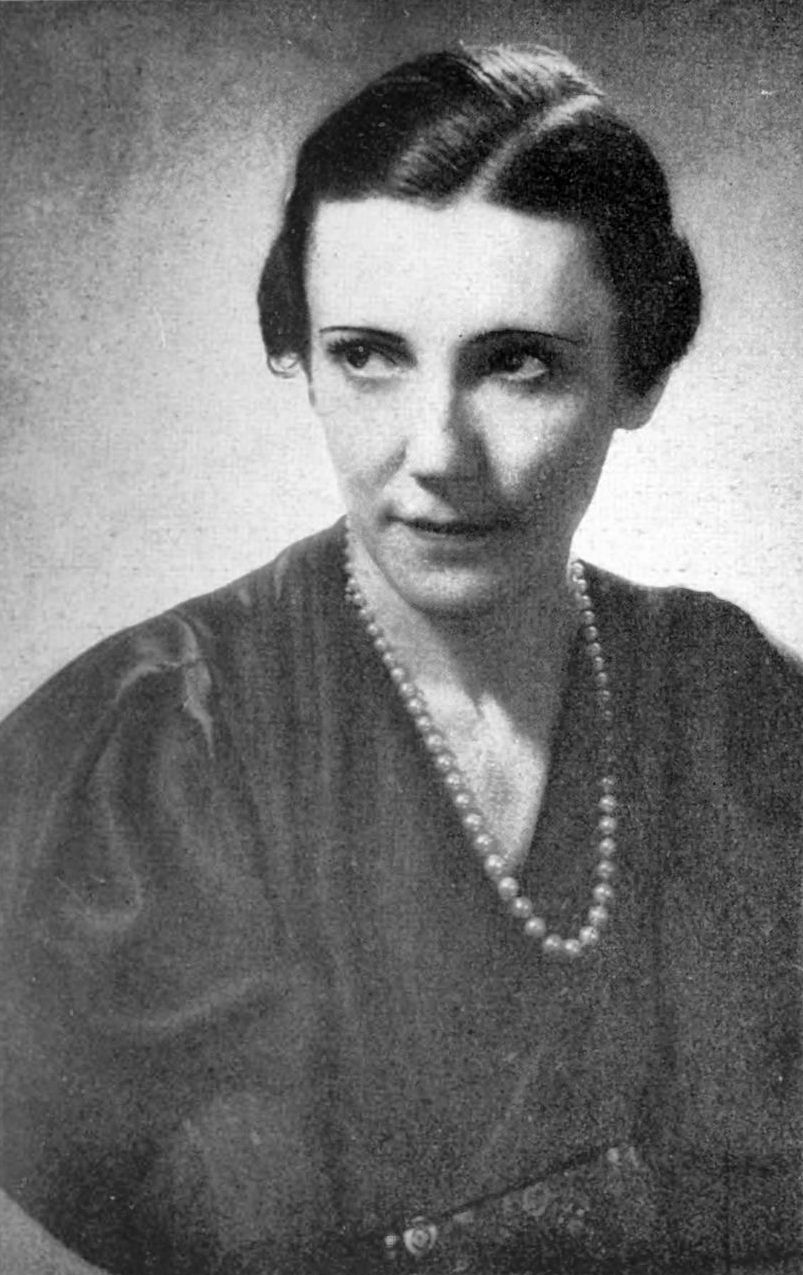
Photograph of d'Andurain from her memoir

Marga d'Andurain (born Jeanne Amélie Marguerite Clérisse; May 29, 1893 – November 5, 1948), was a French adventurer and suspected criminal. During her lifetime, she was accused of espionage, drug trafficking, selling pearls and diamonds on the black market, as well as killing her two husbands and godson, but none of these claims have been conclusively proven. D'Andurain is noted for attempting to become the first female European to enter the holy city of Mecca. She was murdered aboard her yacht, the Djéïlan, at the age of 55.

== Biography ==
=== Childhood and youth ===
Marguerite was born in the family of magistrate Maxime Ernest Clérisse, a judge at the Bayonne court, and housewife Marie Jeanne Diriart. She had a younger brother named Pitt and a sister, Mathilde.

Raised in a provincial, traditional Catholic environment, young Marguerite was always considered a rebel in her community. She scoffed at the conventional education given to young women at the time, which taught them to be effeminate and to respect the male authority. As she was an unruly and rude child; Marguerite was considered an outcast among her peers. According to her own, perhaps embellished, account, at one point in her adolescence, her family attempted to have her exorcised by the local Bishop of the Bayonne.

While studying at a Spanish convent, she received the nickname "Marga", which stuck with her for the rest of her life.

On February 13, 1911, at the age of 17, she married Count Pierre d'Andurain, a cousin she had met two years earlier on a beach in Biarritz.

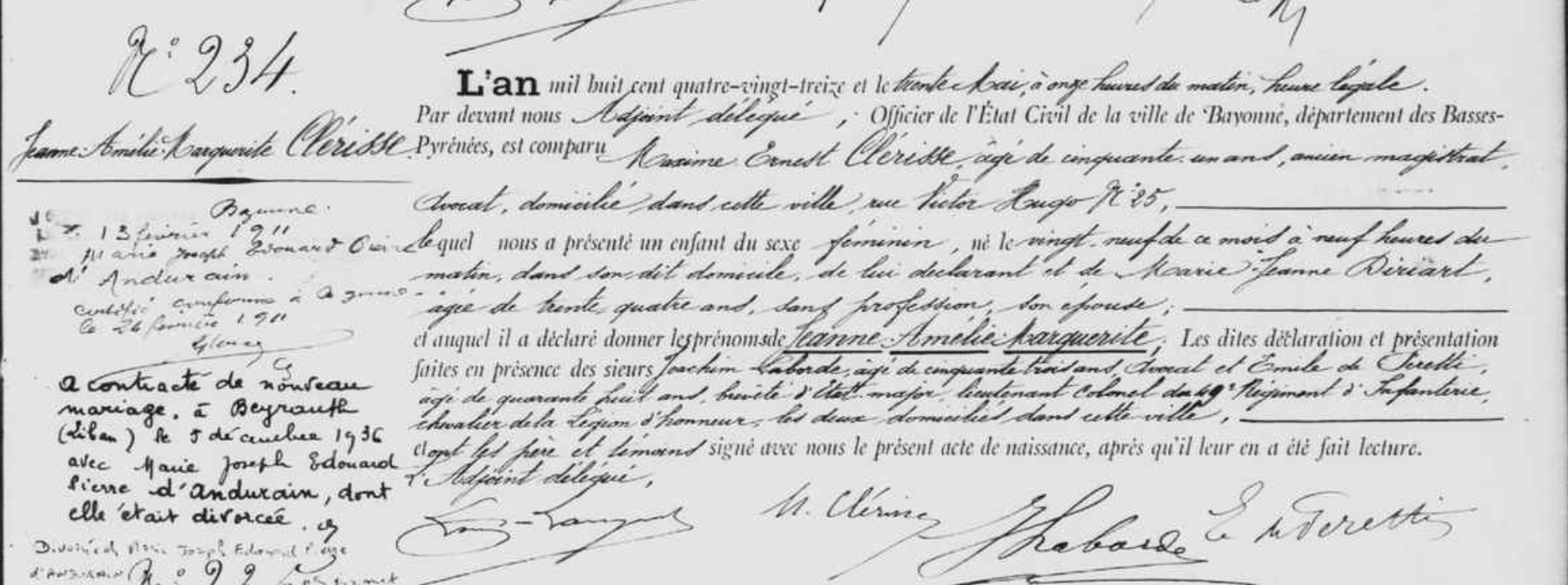
Marga d'Andurain's birth certificate (Bayonne Department Civil Archives)

=== Travels ===
Since both Pierre and Marga came from families of annuitants, and his reluctance to quit his job, the young couple set off on a long honeymoon across Spain, Morocco and then Algeria, where their first son, Jean-Pierre, was born on December 4, 1911.

Economic difficulties forced them to return to France, but didn't stay for long: in 1912, they immigrated to Argentina, where numerous other Basque families were settling, and planned to set a horse breeding business.

This was short lived, as two years later, when the first World War broke out, they moved back to France, as Pierre wanted to fight for his homeland. Their second son, Jacques, was born there on November 26, 1916.

After the economic fallout of the war, the family was left impoverished. Despite the continued disapproval of her family, which discouraged her from working, Marga created two businesses: she decorated apartments which she later bought, renovated and resold, and after that, she dabbled in creating artificial pearls. In the process, she even created her own company, named Arga.

=== Life in the Middle East ===
In 1925, Marga inherited her father's wealth, and so, the family decided to move to the Middle East. Paradoxically, she enjoyed much more freedom there than she did in the West, which was governed by very strict moral codes.

The d'Andurains moved first to Algeria, then travelled to Egypt and finally settled in Syria, where Marga became the owner of the Zénobie hotel in Palmyra, where they stayed from 1927 until 1936. As soon as she moved in, she began an affair with a British intelligence officer, which sparked rumors that she was a spy. These claims were ignored until the point that it became indistinguishable whether it was fact or fiction.

While it was never proven that she was a spy, Marga was considered an adventurous soul. In 1933, she married a Bedouin sheikh and left with him towards Mecca in an attempt to become the first female European to enter the holy city. In June of that year, her new husband died under suspicious circumstances in Jeddah. Marga was subsequently accused of poisoning him, imprisoned and sentenced to death, but was later released following a second trial. She returned to Syria in 1935 and remarried to her husband Pierre, but he was thereafter murdered in Palmyra in December 1936. After suspicion fell on her again, d'Andurain felt the need to leave the Middle East for good.

Like many others in that time, she found life in post-war Europe to be difficult. In order to make a living, she trafficked goods on the black market, particularly paintings. In 1945, she was accused, and later acquitted, of poisoning her nephew, Raymond Clerisse.

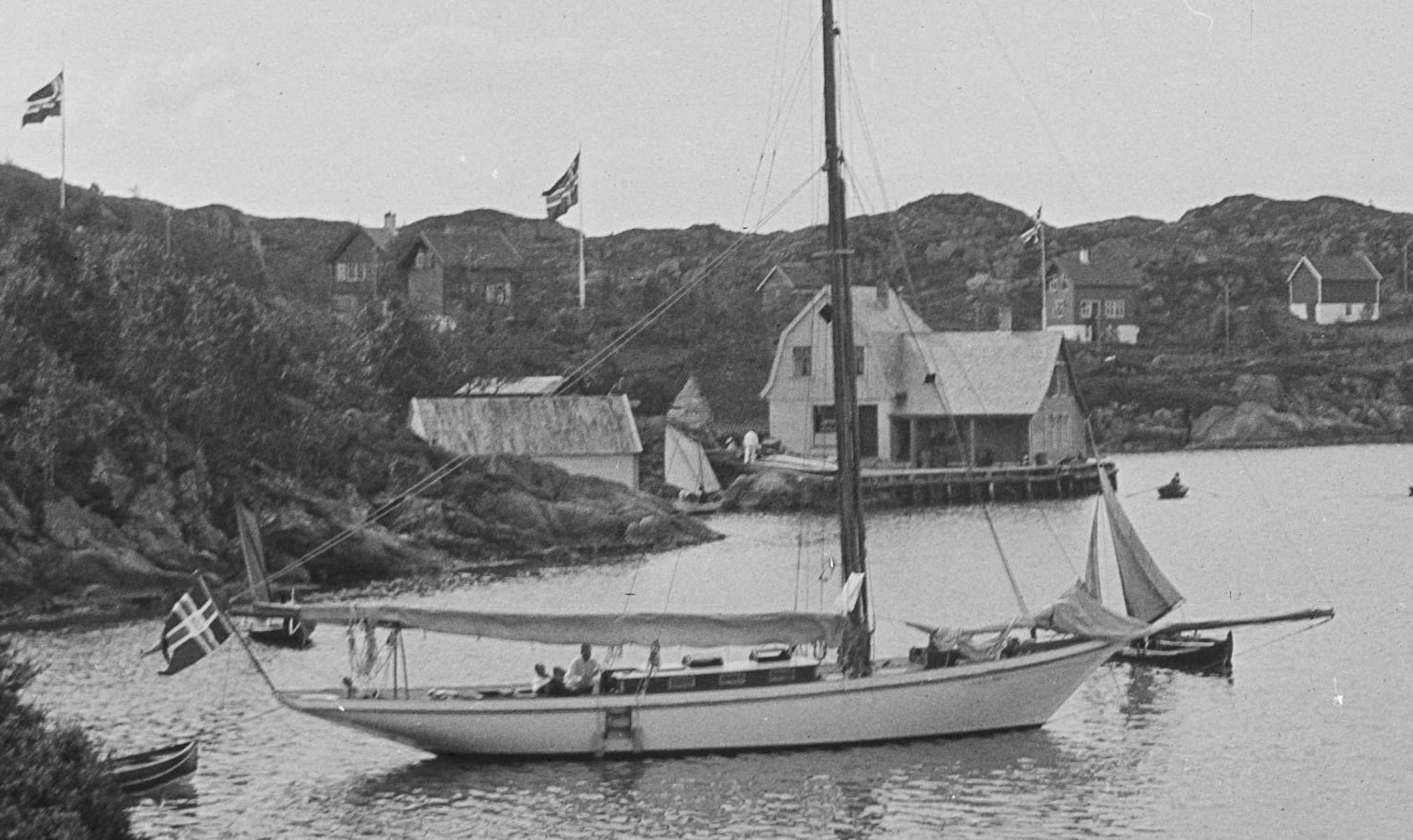
Sister ship to Djeilan built the same year.

In 1947 Marga bought the 53 feet yacht Djéïlan, in Nice, France. The yacht was built 1899/1900 in Norway by the famous Norwegian boat builder Colin Archer. In 1948 Marga used the boat to sail several times between Gibraltar and Morocco.

In November 1948, at the age of 55, Marga d'Andurain disappeared while aboard her yacht, the Djéïlan, in the bay of Tangier, off the coast of Morocco. Her body, thrown in the sea by her killers, was never located.

D'Andurain's life has been the subject of several biographies which are often criticized for embellishing her life story for profit, making hard to distinguish what is true and what isn't.

Julie d'Andurain, Marga's paternal granddaughter, is a professor at the University of Lorraine, where she specializes in African and Arab history during the 19th and 20th centuries.

== Publications ==
- d'Andurain, Marga (1947). Le Mari Passeport (in French). Paris: Jean Froissard. OCLC 369724346.. Réédition Espaces&signes, Paris, 2019 ISBN 979-10-94176-48-1

== Bibliography ==
- Julie d'Andurain, Marga d’Andurain, an avant-garde westerner in the Orient, Master's thesis in history under the supervision of Daniel Rivet, Paris-I-Sorbonne, 1996. (in French)
- Jacques d'Andurain, Drôle de mère, In Libro Veritas, 2007. (in French)
- Morató, Cristina (2010). Captive in Arabia (in Spanish). DeBolsillo. ISBN 978-84-9908-197-7.
- Elie Durel, Marga d'Andurain - The Incredible Destiny of a Basque, La Geste, 2018. (in French)
