= Jean-François Miniac =

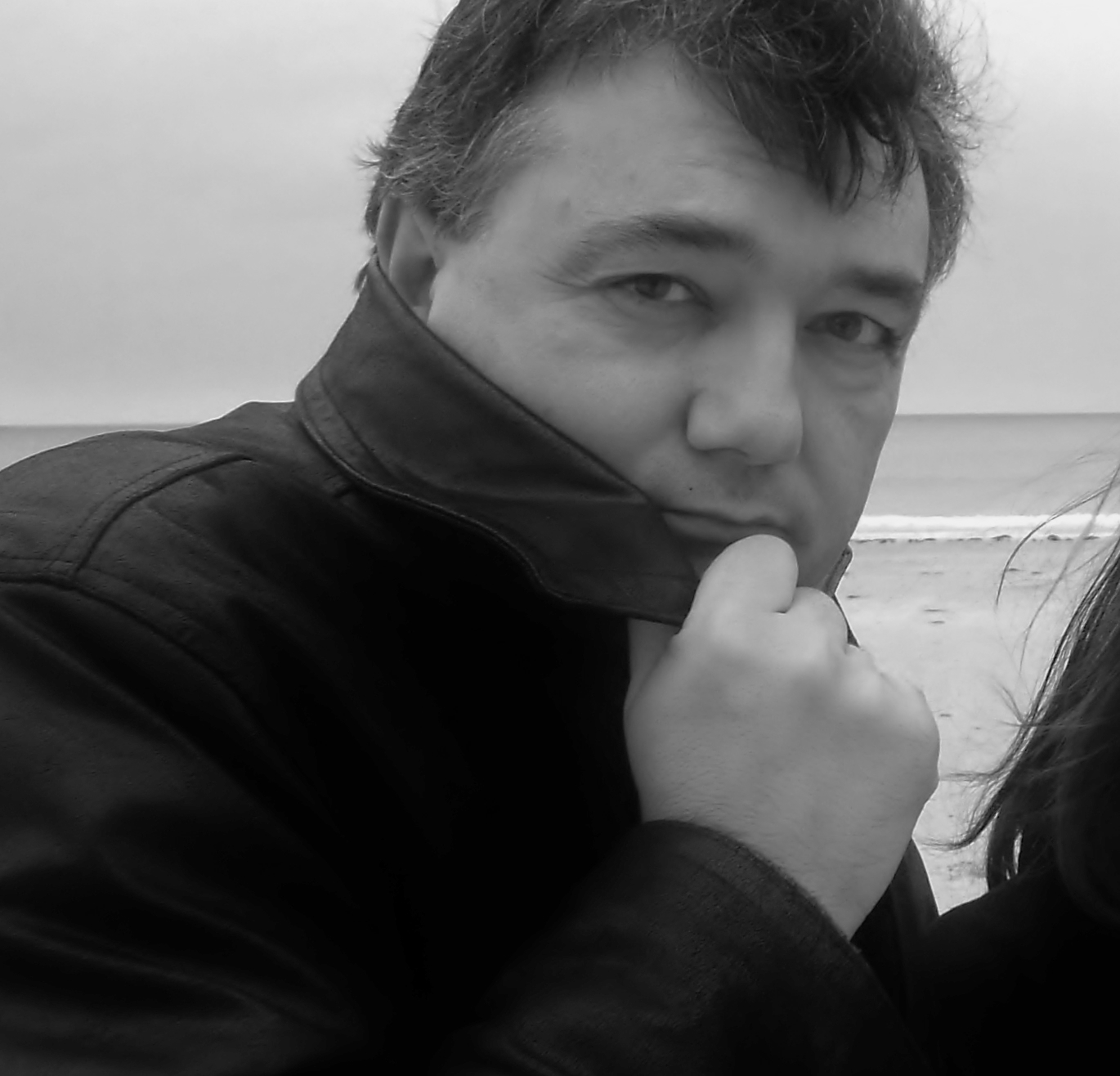
- Born: 17 February 1967 (age 59) Paris
- Areas: Writer, Artist
- Notable works: Les Grandes Affaires d'Espionnage de France; Les Grandes Affaires Criminelles du Rail, * Death of the Nile

Jean-François Miniac (born 1967), better known under his pen name Solidor, is a French comic book creator (writer and artist). He was born in Paris on 17 February 1967 and lives in France.

After a few drawing lessons taken at Hergé from 1976 to 1978, in 1987 he had formal training in the visual arts at the Gobelins School of the Image in Paris.

In 1994, Claude Lefrancq, a Belgian comic publisher, asked Rosalind Hicks to publish Hercule Poirot's comic book, showing her the Blake and Mortimer's comic book, Mortimer versus Mortimer. In 1995, with the novelist François Rivière, French Agatha Christie specialist, Miniac drew his first cartoon series, "Agatha Christie", published at Lefrancq publishing, in Edgar P. Jacobs's spirit, in schematic style. It was a success.

After the publisher went bankrupt in 2000, EP publishers (La Martinière group, Paris) published the comic books, the first one in October 2002 and the second one in February 2003. In four years, 20 000 copies of each have been sold in France (At the end of 2006, 148 000 copies for all the books).

In July 2007, Death on the Nile and Murder on the Orient Express were released by HarperCollins UK as a comic strip, adapted by François Rivière and illustrated by Solidor. These books will be published by HarperCollins in Australia the first November of this year.

Also, one Jean-François Miniac's ancestor is Louis Duchesne, a French historian (Académie française). Marc Tanguy, Saint-Malo's marksman, another ancestor was one of the survivors of the French 74-gun ship Redoutable at Battle of Trafalgar in 1805. At present, Miniac is writing his story.

== Bibliography ==
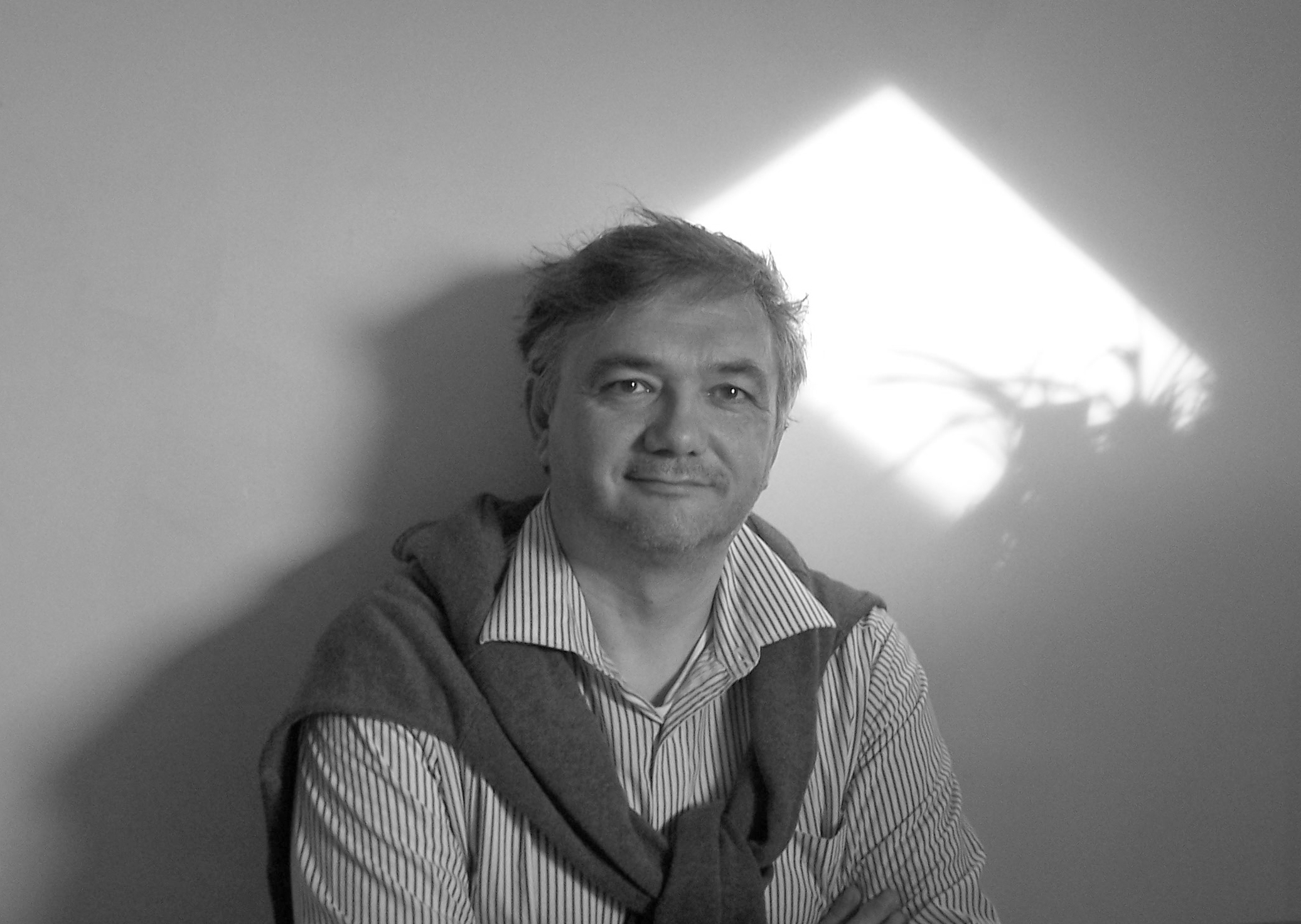
Jean-François Miniac, 2014

Twelve comic strip books in French :

- Agatha Christie (Author), François Rivière (Editor) and Jean-François Miniac (Artist), Murder on the Orient Express, Lefrancq publishers, Bruxelles, 1995. ISBN 2-87153-161-7
- Christie A, Rivière F and Miniac JF, Death on the Nile, Lefrancq publishers : Bruxelles, 1996. ISBN 2-87153-203-6
- Christie A, Rivière F and Solidor, Death on the Nile, EP publishers : Paris, October 2002. ISBN 2-84810-007-9
- Christie A, Rivière F and Solidor, Murder on the Orient Express, EP publishers : Paris, February 2003. ISBN 2-84810-013-3
- Rivière F (Author) and Miniac JF (Artist), cartoon series Outsiders, Glénat publishers : Grenoble, 1998. ISBN 2-7234-2446-4
- Rivière F and Miniac JF, Créatures de cauchemar, Glénat publishers : Grenoble, 1999. ISBN 2-7234-2748-X
- Rivière F and Miniac JF, La revanche de Donald Blank, Glénat publishers : Grenoble, 2000. ISBN 2-7234-3082-0
- Gégé, Belom and Miniac JF, Christophe, Vents d'ouest publishers : Issy-les-Moulineaux, 2005. ISBN 2-7493-0242-0
- Miniac JF, Casters Pauline and Dikeuss, Amiante, chronique d'un crime social, Septième choc publishers : Paris, 2005. ISBN 978-2914809030
- Miniac JF (Author) and Emmanuel Delente (Artist), cartoon series L'arche de Zoé, Zoé sème la zizanie, Des ronds dans l'o publishers : Vincennes, 2006. ISBN 2-9523173-3-X
- Miniac JF (Author) and Borj (Artist), Guillaume, bâtard et conquérant, Orep, 2014. ISBN 978-2-81510-177-6 (about William the Conqueror)

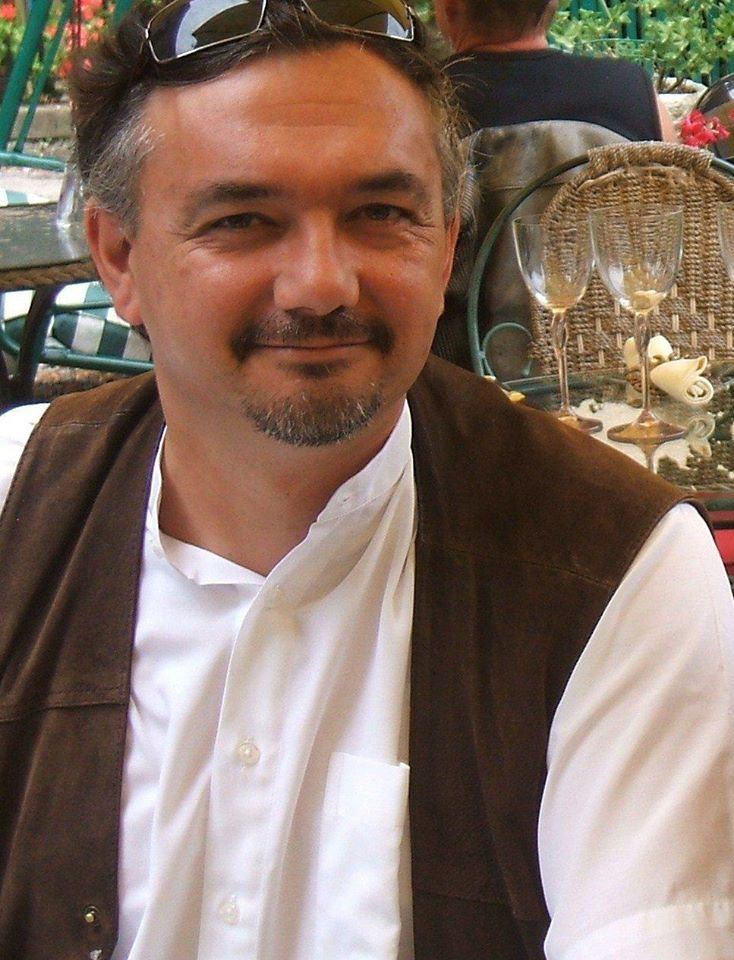
Jean-François Miniac, 2007

Others books in French :

- Miniac JF (Author), Les Grandes Affaires criminelles de l'Orne, De Borée : Paris, 2008, 356 pages (ISBN 978-2-84494-814-4).
- Miniac JF (Author), Les Nouvelles Affaires criminelles de l'Orne, De Borée : Paris, 2009, 384 pages (ISBN 978-2-84494-959-2)
- Miniac JF (Author), Les Mystères de la Manche, préface de Jacqueline et Claude Briot, De Borée : Paris, 2009, 416 pages (ISBN 978-2-84494-968-4)
- Miniac JF (Author), Les Grandes Affaires criminelles de Normandie, De Borée : Paris, 2009, 448 pages (ISBN 978-2-84494-950-9).
- Miniac JF (Author) Les nouveaux mystères de la Manche, De Borée : Paris, March 2011, 416 pages (ISBN 978-2-81290-253-6).
- Miniac JF (Author) Les mystères de l'Orne, De Borée : January 2011, 416 pages (ISBN 978-2-81290-254-3).
- Miniac JF (Author) Les Nouvelles Affaires Criminelles de la Manche, de Borée : Paris, April 2012, 400 pages (ISBN 978-2812906121).
- Miniac JF (Author) Flamboyants escrocs de Normandie, éditions OREP : Nonant, May 2012, 169 pages, (ISBN 978-2-8151-0092-2). (Couverture by Thierry Bruet.)
- Miniac JF (Author) Grandes pages amoureuses de Normandie, Orep : Nonant, June 2012, 169 pages (ISBN 978-2-8151-0093-9). Couverture by François Barraud (1899–1934)
- Miniac JF (Author) Les Grandes Affaires d'Espionnage de France, De Borée : Paris, 2013, 384 pages (ISBN 978-2-8129-0611-4).
- Miniac JF (Author) Les Crimes du rail en France, De Borée : Paris, 2013, 400 pages.(ISBN 978-2-8129-0714-2).
- Miniac JF (Author) Affaires d'Etat, Affaires Privées, Les Très Riches Heures de la République, Métive, April 2015, 336 pages. (ISBN 978-2-3710-9006-4).

Comic strip books in English :

- Agatha Christie, François Rivière and Solidor, Death on the Nile, Agatha Christie Comic strip ED edition, HarperCollins publishers, London, July 2007. ISBN 978-0-00-725058-5
- Agatha Christie, François Rivière and Solidor, Murder on the Orient Express, Agatha Comic Strip Ed edition, HarperCollins publishers, London, July 2007. ISBN 978-0-00-724658-8
- Agatha Christie, François Rivière and Solidor, Murder on the Orient-Express, Melbourne, Australia, November 2007. ISBN 9782848101712
- Miniac JF (Author) and Borja (Art), William, bastard and Conqueror, Orep publishers, Bayeux (France), March 2015. ISBN 978-2-81-510234-6.

== English press ==
- Mulholland Tara, International Herald Tribune, August 22, 2007.
- Lane Megan, BBC News, August 22, 2007.
- Beauman Ned, The Guardian, August 23, 2007.

== Awards ==
- 1997 : Public prize at Creil comics festival, France.
- 2006 : Tournesol prize at Angoulême International Comics Festival, France.(Amiante, chronique d'un crime social).
