= Franz-Olivier Giesbert =

French-American journalist

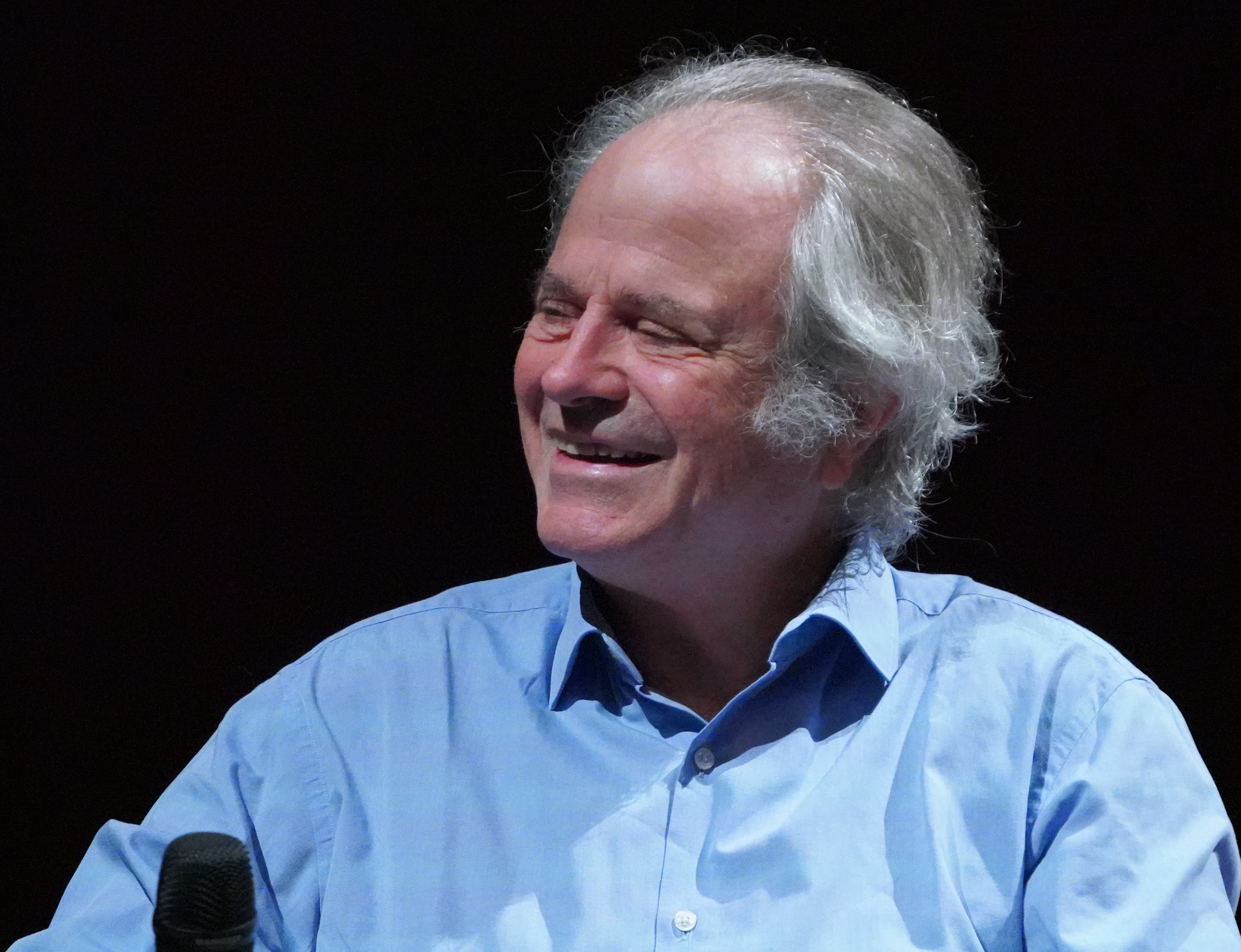
- Giesbert in 2022
- Born: January 18, 1949 (age 77); Wilmington, Delaware, United States
- Education: Centre de formation des journalistes de Paris
- Occupations: Journalist; Columnist; Author; Cultural television programs host

Franz-Olivier Giesbert (French: [fʁɑ̃ts olivje ɡisbɛʁ]; born January 18, 1949) is an American-born French journalist, author, and television presenter.

After serving as editor-in-chief of Le Nouvel Observateur (a French weekly newsmagazine), editorial director of Le Figaro (one of France's leading daily newspapers), and then director of Le Point (a major French right-wing weekly), he was editorial director of La Provence (a regional daily based in Marseille) from 2017 to 2021. A columnist for Le Point, he also sits on the editorial board of the prestigious Revue des Deux Mondes (a long-running French literary and cultural review).

== Early life ==
Franz-Olivier Giesbert's American father was a painter and G.I. during D-Day, and his mother, a philosophy teacher, was from Normandy, France. After the Second World War, his parents went to live in Delaware in the United States, where he was born. At the age of nine, he discovered Ninety-Three by Victor Hugo in a library; he then avidly read all of Hugo's books and those of Honoré de Balzac. At nine, he decided to become a writer and began writing essays, pastiches, and novels.

Franz-Olivier Giesbert grew up feeling entirely French and only discovered his American nationality by chance, around age thirty, while applying for a US visa at the consulate. After some hesitation, he accepted dual citizenship, reasoning that refusing it would have felt like a betrayal of his paternal ancestors. At home, his father insisted on speaking only French, despite a heavy American accent, and made a point of reading Céline and Proust in the original to refine his vocabulary.

== Career ==
With a degree in journalism, Giesbert debuted at the age of 19 on the literary page of the regional daily newspaper Paris-Normandie. There he published interviews with famous writers, such as surrealist Louis Aragon (a frequent nominee for the Nobel Prize in Literature), Henry de Montherlant, Jules Romains (nominated for the Nobel Prize in Literature sixteen times), Maurice Genevoix (who was a WW1 veteran), Alain Robbe-Grillet and others. In 1971, he joined Le Nouvel Observateur as a journalist in the political department and then became a senior reporter. In 1985, Giesbert became the editorial director of the Nouvel Observateur.

For his novel entitled L'Affreux (The Awful), he was awarded the 1992 Grand Prix du roman de l'Académie française (Grand Prize for the Novel of the French Academy) from the French Academy.

In 1997, Giesbert hosted the cable television weekly literary program Le Gai Savoir (The Cheerful Knowledge) broadcast on Paris Première. In recognition for his work with Le Gai Savoir, he received the Prix Richelieu from the Defense of the French language association, which rewards journalists for the quality of their language.

From 1998 to 2000, Giesbert was editorial director of Le Figaro.

Giesbert was chief executive officer of Le Point from 2000 until 18 January 2014; he remained an adviser to the magazine, continuing to write editorials and articles.

From 2011 to 2015, he hosted Les Grandes Questions (The Big Questions), a debate program broadcast on France 5.

From 2012, he also hosted the monthly show Le Monde d'Après (The World After) featuring several guests discussing current news, broadcast on France 3.

In 2013, he wrote the scenario of a documentary about his relationship with the former president of France: Nicolas Sarkozy, secrets d'une présidence (Nicolas Sarkozy, secrets of a presidency).

In May 2016, Giesbert was awarded the newly created Récamier Prize for his novel, L'Arracheuse de dents (The puller of teeth).

On 25 March 2023, he was awarded the Prix du livre politique (Political book prize) for his novel entitled Histoire intime de la Ve République: La belle époque (Intimate history of the Fifth Republic: The beautiful era).

== Controversies ==
In 2007, he wrote the biography of Marseille's (in)famous mobster Jacky le Mat, L'Immortel, adapted by Richard Berry.

In 2018, he was attacked by Asia Argento and Marlène Schiappa for claiming that actresses who accused Harvey Weinstein of sexual assault had to know what they were getting into. This was decried as gaslighting, slut shaming and victim blaming.

In 2021, the pedophile writer Gabriel Matzneff described Giesbert as an unwavering support.

Giesbert was criticized by Laure Adler for complaining that people didn't speak French at the Marseille train station.

== Selected novels ==
- L'Affreux (The Awful), Grasset, 1992 (Grand prix du roman de l'Académie française, 1992)
- La Souille (The Taint), Grasset, 1995 (Prix Interallié, 1995)
- Un très grand amour (A very great love), Gallimard, 2010 (Prix Alain Duménil, 2010)
- La cuisinière d'Himmler (Himmler's cook), Gallimard, 2013 (Globe de Cristal Awards winner, 2014)
