= French ship Redoutable =

Nine ships of the French Navy have borne the name Redoutable ("Redoubtable"):

== Ships named Redoutable ==
- Redoutable (1752), 74-gun ship of the line. She was destroyed at the Battle of Lagos in 1759.
- Redoutable (1795), a 74-gun ship of the line. She was captured at the Battle of Trafalgar in 1805.
- Redoutable (1800), an aviso captured by HMS Success on 26 June 1800.
- Redoutable (1801) a coastguard.
- Redoutable (1804) a xebec. (Note: The Redoutables of 1801 and 1804 might actually be the same ship.)
- Redoutable (1855), an Algésiras-class ship of the line.
- Redoutable (1876), the first warship in the world to be built in steel.
- Redoutable (1928) (1930), lead ship of the Redoutable-class submarines before the Second World War
- Redoutable (S611) (1971), first SNLE submarine of the French Navy, now a museum and the largest submarine in the world open to the public.
Ships of the French Navy named Redoutable
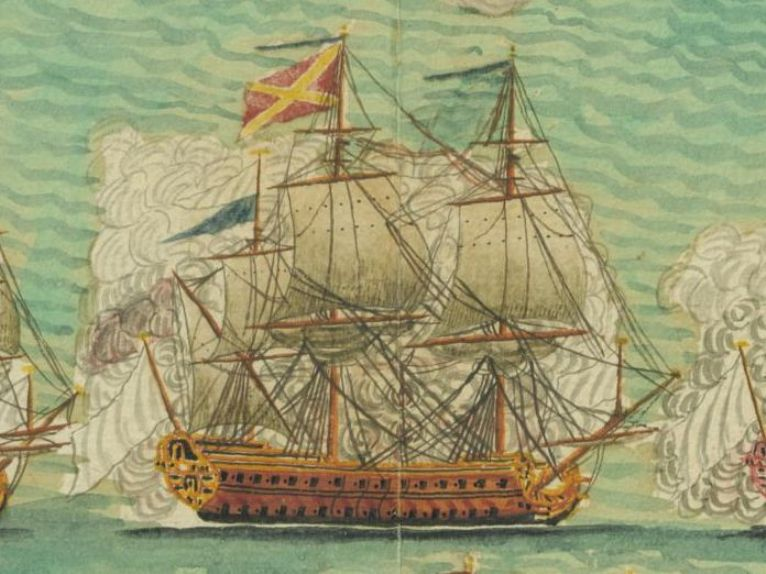
Redoutable (1752) at the Battle of Minorca

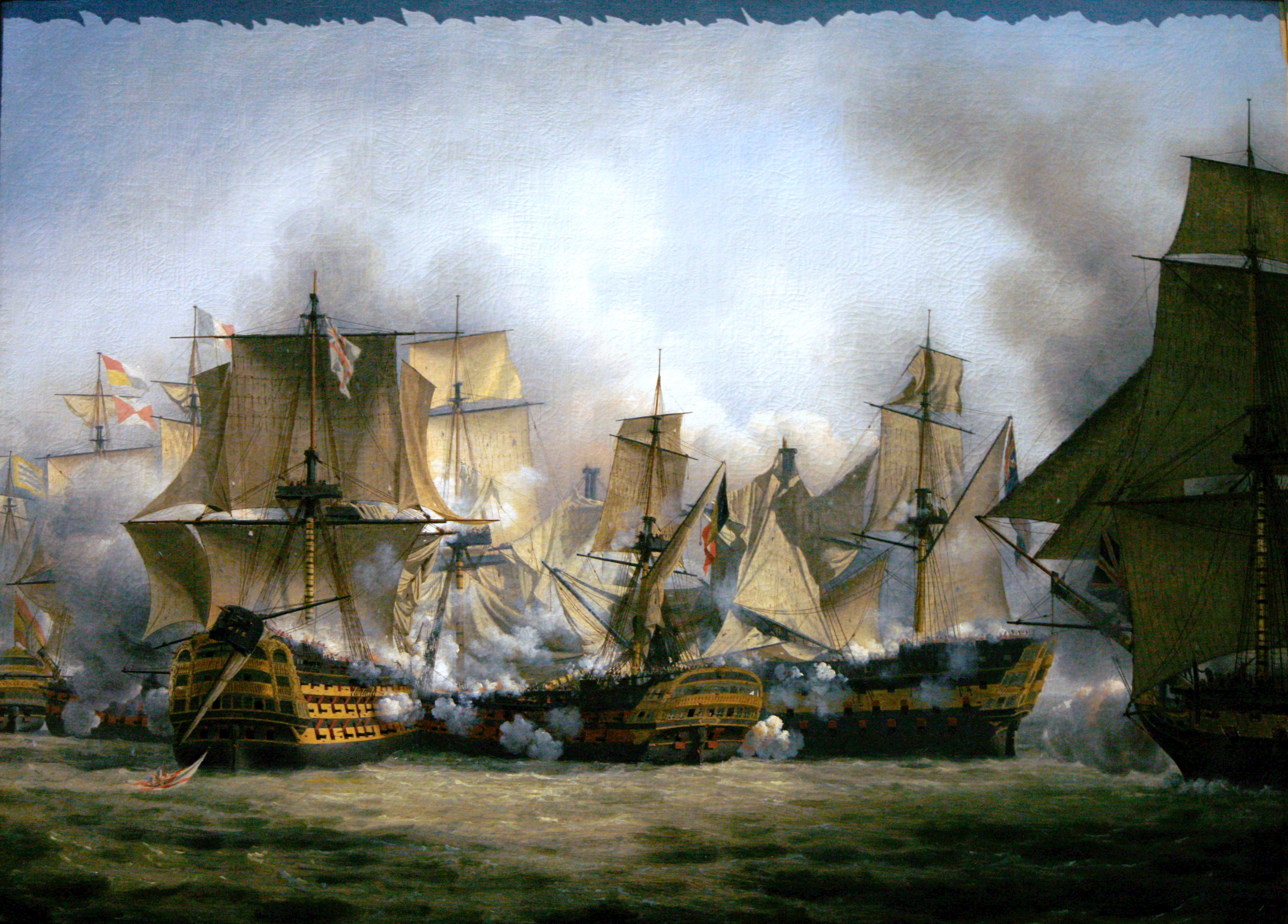
Redoutable (1795) (centre) at the Battle of Trafalgar

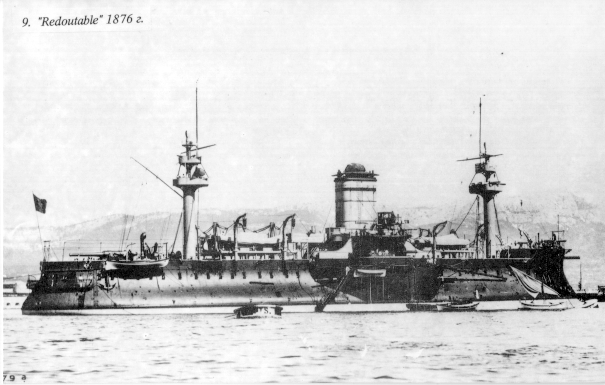
The ironclad Redoutable in 1876

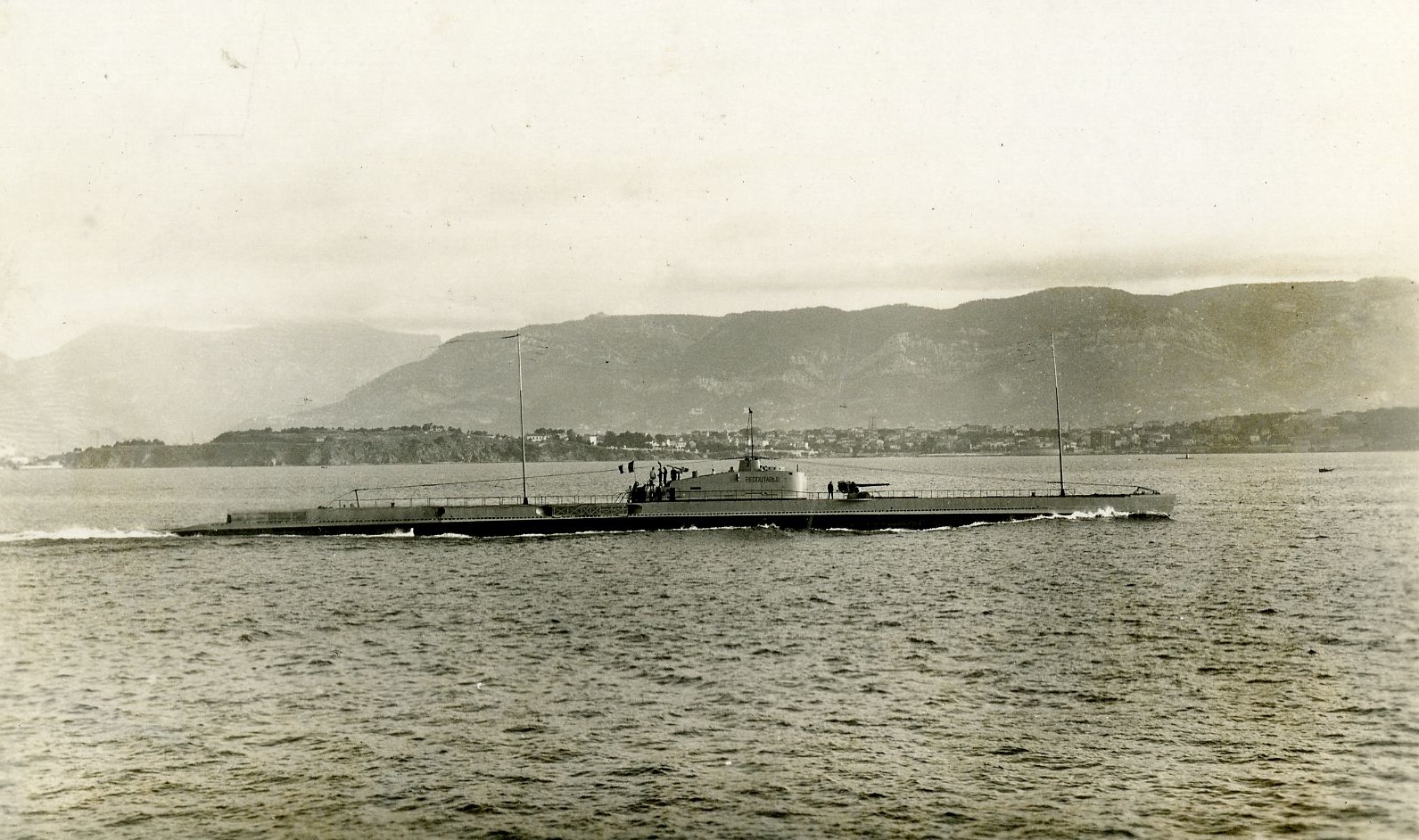
Redoutable (Q136) off Toulon in 1930

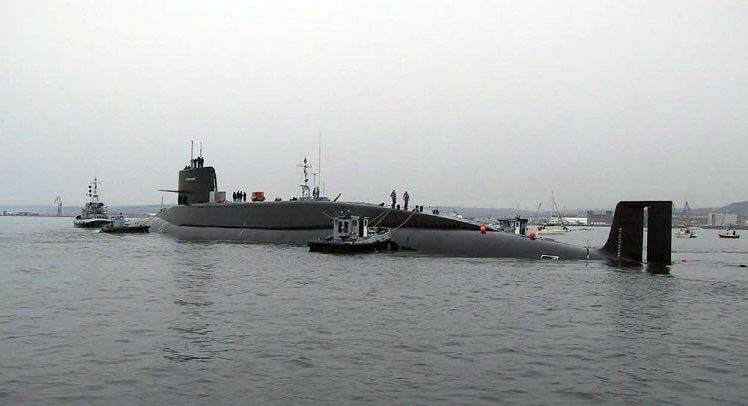
The nuclear submarine Redoutable (S611) in 2005

== See also ==
- HMS Redoubtable

== Notes and references ==
=== Bibliography ===
- Roche, Jean-Michel (2005a). Dictionnaire des bâtiments de la flotte de guerre française de Colbert à nos jours [Dictionary of French Warships from Colbert to the Present Day]. Vol. I: 1670–1870. Group Retozel-Maury Millau. ISBN 978-2-9525917-0-6. OCLC 165892922.
- Roche, Jean-Michel (2005b). Dictionnaire des bâtiments de la flotte de guerre française de Colbert à nos jours [Dictionary of French Warships from Colbert to the Present Day]. Vol. II: 1870–2006. Group Retozel-Maury Millau. ISBN 978-2-9525917-0-6. OCLC 165892922.
