= Jacky Imbert =

French gang leader (1929–2019)

Jacques Imbert
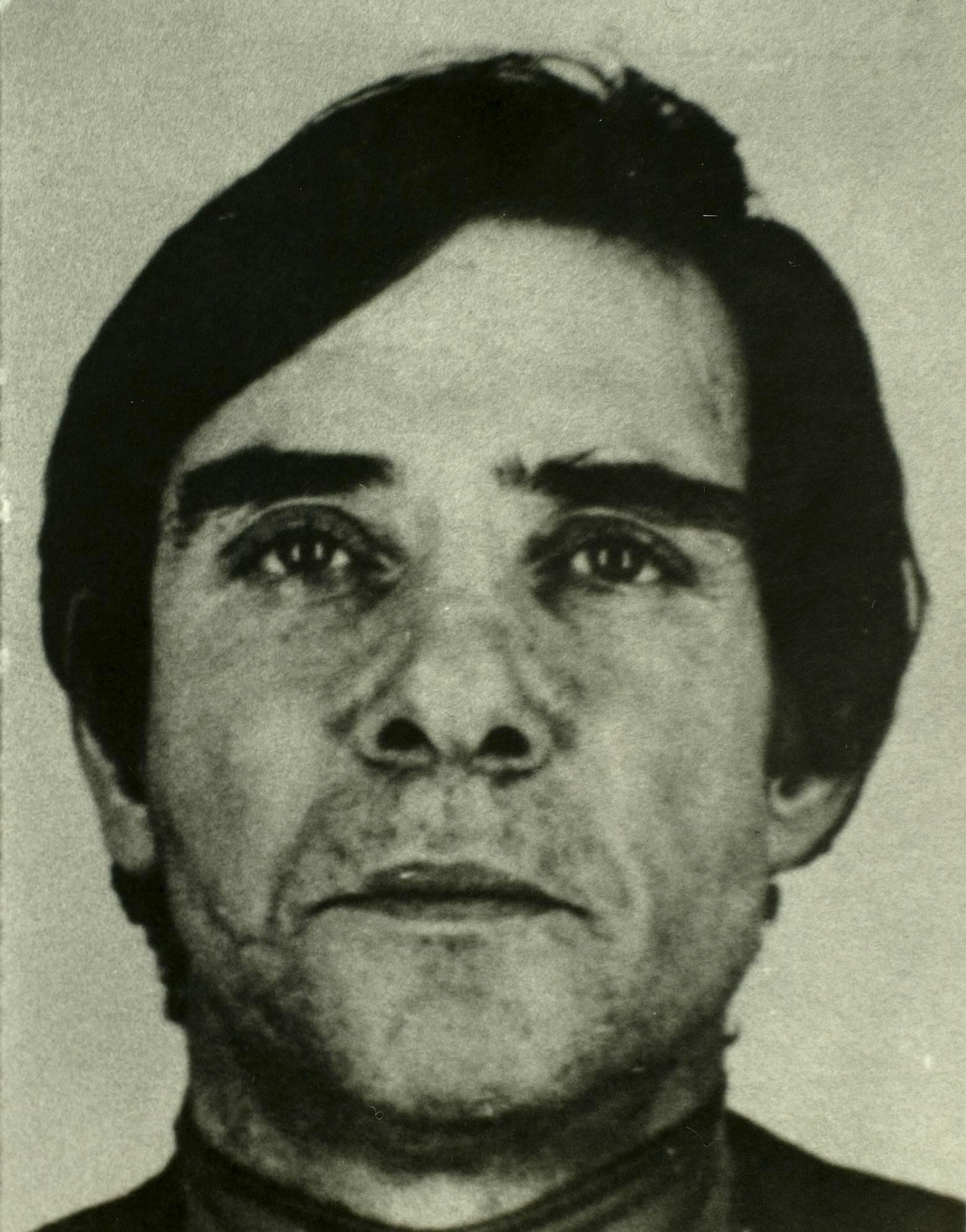
- Born: 30 December 1929; Toulouse, France
- Died: 11 November 2019 (aged 89); Aix-en-Provence, France
- Other names: Jacky Le Mat
- Occupations: Infantryman; Trotting trainer and driver; Stuntman; Nightclub public relations; Shipyard manager

Jacques Imbert (30 December 1929 – 11 November 2019) was a French gang leader who first came to prominence in 1960s Marseille's underworld, where he was considered "The Last Godfather". His nickname "Jacky le Mat" means "Jacky the madman" in Provençal. He was also known as "Pacha" and "Matou".

== Early life ==
Imbert was born in Toulouse, the son of an aviation worker with a passion for opera. Imbert was sentenced to five years in prison in 1947 for an assault on his mother-in-law's lover in a Montpellier bar, but served less than two due to good conduct. In prison his cellmate was Gustave Méla, nicknamed "Gu le Terrible", another criminal that would become notorious in the 1960s, and adopted the nickname Jacky Le Mat.

In 1948 Imbert enrolled in the French Army and spent four years in the 15e Régiment de Tirailleurs Sénégalais in Oran, French Algeria. He was discharged for having a "character incompatible with military regulations".

== Years with les Trois Canards ==
At the start of the 1950s Imbert joined the Bande des Trois Canards, the "Three Ducks Gang", so-named after the cabaret club which was their den. The gang specialised in burglaries, hold-ups and racketeering, and was said to have built a cellar in their club in which people who resisted paying protection money would be tortured. It was while he was in this gang, mainly composed of Marseille Italians, that Imbert met another future gang leader, Tany Zampa, with whom he would forge a close friendship. Other members were Marius Bertella, Gégène le Manchot (Gégène the one-armed) and Gaétan Alboréo. It was with them that the young Imbert learned the ropes of the trade, becoming a central element of the team, thanks to his self-control and his determination.

Imbert's legitimate work during this period was as a stunt driver, also taking part in races on Marseille's Old Harbour. He became known as a womaniser, with two marriages and six mistresses.

In 1961 he was convicted of pimping in a case involving Raymond Infantes, the kingpin of Oran's brothels, and condemned to six months in prison. Infantes had played on his connections to escape a prison sentence while implicating Imbert, who would never forgive him. Imbert exacted his revenge on Infantes: under cover of the night, he piloted a small Cessna airplane across the Mediterranean to Algeria, kidnapped Infantes and brought him back to Marseille, where he tortured him and demanded a large sum of money as ransom. Fearing for his life Infantes paid up, and the money permitted Imbert to set up his own gang. Imbert hired twenty men without Zampa's knowledge and, while appearing to remain under Zampa's control, he began to run his own separate organisation.

On 14 April 1963 Imbert shot a Corsican Parisian boss, Jean-Baptiste Andréani with a shotgun, twice at point-blank range. Andréani survived. The motive of the shooting is not clear: It might be that Andréani refused to pay the 500,000 Franc protection money demanded by the "Three Ducks", or it may have been a contract taken out by Andréani's rival, Marcel Francisci.

The "Bande des Trois Canards" disbanded around 1965. Mob boss Antoine Guérini was assassinated in a drive-by on 23 June 1967. Imbert is suspected of shooting him on Zampa's orders, as Zampa was still Imbert's boss. The murder was supported by the Milieu gang, who wanted revenge for the killing of Robert Blémant by the Guérini clan. In 1968 Imbert was put on the Police organised crime file with the number 909/68. He also became a trotting driver with his friend Alain Delon in 1968, and in 1973 he became the French champion.

== Attempted murder by Zampa Gang ==
On 1 February 1977 Imbert survived a murder attempt by Tony Zampa's crew. He was shot many times and doctors removed twenty-two projectiles, including seven bullets, from his body. His right arm remained paralysed as a result of the attack; though the French newspaper Le Monde wrote, "Small matter, he learned to shoot with the left".

Imbert's revenge came when eleven of Zampa's associates were gunned down for the failed murder attempt. Imbert was later arrested as he allegedly prepared for another killing. No charges were brought against him, and he was released after six months. When he came out a truce had been declared. After this period, Imbert seemed to lead a quiet life between the Caribbean, Italy and France. In the 1980s he was also the public relations man for the discothèque "Bus Palladium" in Paris, which was owned by his friend Richard Erman, a Russian-born businessman.

He was a close friend of Francis "The Belgian" Vanverberghe, another mob boss whose early drug trafficking was described in the movie The French Connection. Vanverberghe was shot dead in a betting club near the Champs-Élysées, Paris, in September 2000.

== Trials ==
Police were investigating a criminal operation run by the Russian Mafia who were planning to build a clandestine cigarette factory in a warehouse in a suburb of Marseille. As a part of that investigation police taped a phone conversation between Imbert and Erman. Imbert said: "Look, all these ups and downs, they are beginning to cause me problems, you get it?". Police were convinced this was evidence he was part of the operation run by the Russian mafia and in October 2003 he was arrested in a police raid on his home.

The trial started in November 2004. The state prosecutor asked for a five-year prison term for Imbert, the highest term asked for during the case. Prosecutor Marc Gouton said: "Everyone here has testified that without Imbert's authorisation nothing could be done. He has a very strong character. He is not a man who takes orders. He gives orders and others carry them out"; however, prosecution witnesses later retracted their initial testimony. The only remaining evidence linking Imbert to the Mafia project was the telephone call with Erman, which his lawyer said in court is open to interpretation: "The case against him is so hollow, so inexistent, so empty, that I am reduced to answering a charge based on the intonation of a voice".

The court in Marseille sentenced him to four years in prison for masterminding the operation. It seemed Imbert's long run of luck had run out. However, he appealed and on 8 April 2005, at 75 years old, Imbert was cleared of taking part in the scam to manufacture contraband cigarettes. The appeal court found that the telephone tap evidence against him was unconvincing. The link between the Russian Mafia and Imbert was Richard Erman.

On 16 June 2006 Imbert was sentenced to four years for extorting money from Paris businessmen in the early 1990s. Imbert's counsel appealed the verdict, but on 2 January 2008 Imbert was sentenced to two years.

== In popular culture ==
22 Bullets, a French film released in 2010, was based on Imbert, who was portrayed by actor Jean Reno.
