= List of French serial killers =

A serial killer is typically a person who murders three or more people, with the murders taking place over more than a month and including a significant period of time between them. The Federal Bureau of Investigation (FBI) defines serial killing as "a series of two or more murders, committed as separate events, usually, but not always, by one offender acting alone".

== Identified serial killers ==
Name	Years active	Proven victims	Possible victims	Status	Notes	Ref
Aiutino, Vincenzo	1991–1992	3	3	Sentenced to life imprisonment	Known as "The Man with the Fifty Affairs"; Swiss who raped and strangled three women between 1991 and 1992 in Meurthe-et-Moselle	
Alègre, Patrice	1987–1997	5	11+	Sentenced to life imprisonment	Raped and strangled women in Toulouse and Paris; his case caused accusations of a police cover-up	
Attoumani, Dailami	2017	3	3	30 years imprisonment	Known as "The Barbarian of Montluçon"; killed three old people and raped a young woman with Zaki Ali Toumbou in order to steal their money	
Madame de Brinvilliers	1666–1670	3	3	Executed 1676	Aristocrat who poisoned her father and two brothers	
Barbeault, Marcel	1969–1976	8	8	Sentenced to life imprisonment	Known as "The Shadow Killer"; killed his victims during the nighttime or early mornings	
Bodein, Pierre	2004	3	3	Sentenced to life imprisonment without possibility of release	Nicknamed “Pierrot le Fou”; murdered three young people aged 10, 38 and 14 on 18, 21 and 25 June 2004. He was the first Frenchman to be sentenced to this penalty	
Bonnal, Jean-Claude	1973–2001	7	7	Sentenced to life imprisonment	Known as "The Chinese"; convicted of seven murders, two attempted murders and several burglaries and armed robberies, between 1973 et 2001.	
Buffet, Claude	1967–1971	3	3	Executed 1972	Took a prison guard and nurse hostage and later killed while serving a life sentence for a previous murder	
Chambet, Ludivine	2012–2013	10	10	25 years imprisonment	Known as "The Poisoner of Chambéry"; nurse's aide who poisoned elderly people using antidepressants	
Chanal, Pierre	1975–1988	8	17	Committed suicide awaiting trial	Soldier suspected of raping and murdering young men in Marne	
Cottrez, Dominique	1989–2006	8	8	9 years imprisonment	Murdered her newborn infants in her home in Villers-au-Tertre	
Dankerque, Casimir	1935	4	4	Executed 1936	Known as "The Monster of Artois"; murdered elderly people during robberies in Pommier and Achicourt	
Dumollard, Martin	1855–1861	3	3	Executed 1862	Known as "The Maid Killer"; with the help of his wife Marie-Anne Martinet, attacked and robbed maids in Lyon and Ain, killing three of them	
El Borgi, Thierry	1989	3	3	Sentenced to life imprisonment	Together with partner Philippe Siauve and Thierry Jaouen, murdered two young women in July 1989 and murdered an officer with Siauve few days later	
Faleh, Mohamed	1995–1999	3	3	Sentenced to life imprisonment	Known as "The Axe Killer". Responsible for at least three murders and one attempted murder between 1995 and 1999. Nicknamed “Bouraba” by his acquaintances	
Fourniret, Michel	1987–2003	12	35	Died in prison	Known as "The Ogre of the Ardennes"; with his help of his wife Monique Olivier, kidnapped, raped and murdered predominantly young girls across France and Belgium	
Frantz, Véronique	1852–1854	3	3	Executed 1854	Poisoned her employer's mother-in-law and wife to become his mistress; later poisoned him after she learned he planned to remarry	
Fruminet, Jacques	1980–1998	3	3	Died in prison	Nicknamed "The Man with a Thousand and One Faces". Killed an elderly woman in 1980 and was sentenced to 15 years' imprisonment. Assaulted three other women, following successive releases, in 1989 and 1991. Released in May 1998, he kills two more women on November of the same year, and is sentenced to life imprisonment. Died in prison in 2014	
Garnier, Gilles	1572–1573	4	4+	Executed 1573	Known as "The Hermit of St. Bonnot"; reclusive hermit who confessed to murdering and cannibalizing young children	
Gateaux, Maurice	1956–1967	3	3	Released in 2016 and died in 2019	Known as "The King Kong". Committed his first murder in 1956, but was soon released due to insanity. In 1965, he committed a robbery in which he fatally beat a prison guard. Sentenced to 20 years' imprisonment, he killed a prison guard in 1967 and attempted to kill another. Sentenced to life imprisonment, he was released in 2016 after 51 years in prison, and died in 2019.	
Gaudissard, Poncé	2001–2003	2	4	Died in prison	Involved in four murders, in 2001 and 2003, as well as a rape in 2004. However, he was not prosecuted for the 2001 murders	
Georges, Guy	1991–1997	7	7	Sentenced to life imprisonment	Known as "The Beast of Bastille"; raped and murdered women in the Bastille neighbourhood of Paris	
Hachani, Saïb	1962–1963	3	3	Executed in 1966	Nicknamed "Saïb Le Rouge". Perpetrator of three murders in 1962 and 1963. Sentenced to death, he was executed in 1966.	
Haddouche, Jacquy	1992–2002	3	3+	Died in prison	Career criminal who murdered women across the country	
Heaulme, Francis	1984–1992	11	13+	Sentenced to life imprisonment	Known as "The Criminal Backpacker"; murdered a wide variety of victims across the country, some with a yet-unidentified accomplice	
Jaouen, Thierry	1989	3	3	Released in 2010	Together with partner Philippe Siauve and another accomplice, murdered a young woman in May 1989, and killed two other young women in July with Thierry El Borgi and Siauve.	
Jégado, Hélène	1833–1851	3	36	Executed 1852	Domestic servant who poisoned various people with arsenic	
Keller, Yvan	1991–2001	23	40–150	Committed suicide awaiting trial	Known as "The Pillow Killer"; smothered and then robbed elderly women across France, Germany and Switzerland	
Laget, Pierre	1922–1929	1	3	Committed suicide in prison	Nicknamed "Doctor Herbal Tea" and "Doctor Mystery". Convicted of killing his second wife in 1929 and attempting to kill his sister by poisoning in the winter of 1929-1930. Suspected of killing his first wife in 1922 and his tent in 1923 in the same circumstances. Sentenced to death, commuted to hard labour for life, he committed suicide in prison in 1944	
Lagrée, Pierre	1915–1916	4	6	Executed 1916	Soldier who killed people during robberies; confessed to two more while residing in New York, United States	
Lambin, Michel	1983–2004	4	10+	Sentenced to life imprisonment	Known as "The Shepherd of Caussols". Suspected of five murders in 1983. Acquitted in 1986 for a sixth murder in 1984. Perpetrator of four other murders between 2001 and 2004. Arrested in 2005 and sentenced to life imprisonment	
Landru, Henri Désiré	1915–1919	11	11+	Executed 1922	Known as "The Bluebeard of Gambais"; killed mistresses and lovers during the war period; inspired the character of Monsieur Verdoux played by Charlie Chaplin	
Lastennet, Claude	1993–1994	5	5	Died in prison	Strangled elderly women after burgling into their Paris apartments	
Lefèvre, David	1999–2011	3	3	Sentenced to life imprisonment	Known as "The Swamp Killer"; killed two acquaintances for trivial disputes and dumped their bodies in swamps, having previously served time for killing a homeless man	
Lesage, Céline	2000–2007	6	6	15 years imprisonment	Suffocated and strangled her newborn infants in Valognes	
Louis, Émile	1970–1986	7	12+	Died in prison	Prime suspect in the serial murders of handicapped women in Yonne	
Malèvre, Christine	1997–1998	30	30	10 years imprisonment	Killed terminally-ill patients in Mantes-la-Jolie	
Matencio, Joël	1974–1976	3	4	Died in 2022	Nicknamed "The Man of the Red Brigades", after kidnapping and murdering three people in the summer of 1976. He had already been prosecuted for the murder of a hotel manager in 1974, but his case was dismissed.	
Millet, Albert	1954–2007	3	3	Committed suicide to avoid apprehension	Killed two girlfriends and one of his lover's friends in Hyères	
Monvoisin, Catherine	17th-century	Unknown, alleged 1000	Alleged 2500+	Executed 1680	Head of a Paris fortune teller network who sold poisons, contributing to thousands of deaths	
Palmier, Yoni	2011–2012	4	4	Sentenced to life imprisonment	Known as "The Essonne Killer"; killed four people between November 2011 and April 2012 in Essonne, France.	
Pauletto, André	1960–1977	3	3	Died in prison	Convicted of the murders of three people close to him: his mistress in 1960, his wife in 1967 and his 10-year-old daughter in 1977. He died in 2016 after 53 years in prison, 49 of which were continuous.	
Paulin, Thierry	1984–1987	18	27	Died in prison	Known as "The Beast of Montmarte"; murdered old women in Paris, between 1984 and 1987. Died in prison in 1989	
Peiry, Michel	1981–1987	5	11	Sentenced to life imprisonment	Known as "The Sadist of Romont"; Swiss national who sexually abused and murdered hitchhikers across several European countries and the USA	
Pel, Albert	1872–1884	1	5	Died in prison	Known as "The Clockmaker of Montreuil"; killed his last wife in 1884, suspected of killing two other wives in 1880, and of killing his parents in 1872 and 1873. Sentenced to hard labour for life, he died in prison in 1924.	
Pesquet, Bernard	1941–1976	6	6+	Died in prison	Known as "The Landru of Val-d'Oise"; killed his best friend in 1941, released from prison and murdered at least six others	
Petiot, Marcel	1926–1944	27	63+	Executed 1946	Doctor who murdered would-be refugees fleeing from the Nazis	
Petroff, Jean-Marc	1995–1998	4	4	Died in prison	The perpetrator of three murders of homeless people in 1995 and 1998, he is also implicated in the murder of politician Jean-Claude Poulet Dachary in 1995. Sentenced to 30 years' imprisonment, he died in prison in 2012	
Philip, Baptistine	1871–1878	3	3	Died in prison	Fatally poisoned her employer, husband, and uncle-in-law for monetary gain	
Philippe, Xavier	1988–2005	2	4	Released in 2025	Known as "The Serial Killer of Associates"; Suspected of having killed three of his associates, of having attempted to kill another and of having deliberately killed a pensioner, between 1988 and 2005	
Poirson, Louis	1995–1999	4	5+	Sentenced to life imprisonment	Known as "Rambo"; Malagasy-born stonemason who kidnapped and raped women, killing four of them	
de Rais, Gilles	15th-century	Unknown, alleged 140	140+	Executed 1440	Compatriot of Joan of Arc who confessed to murdering scores of children	
Rançon, Jacques	1986–1998	3	3+	Sentenced to life imprisonment	Known as the "Perpignan Station Killer"; killed three young women between 1986 and 1998. Arrested in 2014, he was sentenced to life imprisonment.	
Recco, Tommy	1959–1980	7	10	Died in prison	Formerly one of the oldest French prisoners before his death in 2025, aged 91.	
Rezala, Sid Ahmed	1999	3	3+	Committed suicide in custody	Known as "The Killer of the Trains"; Algerian-born rapist who murdered at least three women near train tracks	
Richetto, Luigi	1893–1899	4	4	Died in prison	Italian concierge who robbed and murdered three women and one man in Lyon, dismembering their bodies afterwards	
Robini, André	1955–1956	3	3	Died in 2001	Known as "The Old Lady Killer"; assaulted and robbed numerous elderly women in Paris and Versailles, killing three of them	
Roy, Rémy	1990	3	3	Sentenced to life imprisonment	Known as "The Minitel Killer"; murdered three gay men after staged sadomasochistic acts	
Salameh, Patrick	2008	4	4	Sentenced to life imprisonment	Known as "The Marseille Ripper"; kidnapped, raped and murdered three prostitutes and a student in Marseille	
Sarret, Georges-Alexandre	1925–1930	3	5	Executed 1934	Nicknamed "The Lawyer Murderer". Convicted of murdering an abbot and his mistress in 1925, and a woman in 1930 whom he tried to pass off as his accomplice. Suspected of killing two spouses of his accomplices. Arrested in 1931 and sentenced to death, he was executed in 1934.	
Sasia, Giuseppe	1930–1934	4	5+	Executed 1936	Known as "The Shepherds' Killer"; Italian criminal who killed and then robbed shepherds in Draguignan; suspected of an earlier murder in 1930	
Scieri, Antoinette	1924–1926	12	12	Died in prison	Italian-born nurse who poisoned elderly patients with herbicide pyralion	
Sedrati, Nadir	1982–1999	3	5	Sentenced to life imprisonment	Known as "The Cutter of the Canal"; murdered and dismembered three people, disposing of the remains into the Marne-Rhine Canal; suspect in two other disappearances	
Siauve, Philippe	1989	4	4	Sentenced to life imprisonment	Together with partner Thierry Jaouen and another accomplice, murdered a young woman in May 1989, killed two other young women in July with Thierry El Borgi and Jaouen and one man with El Borgi a few days later	
Siegler, Franck	1986–2017	3	3	Sentenced to life imprisonment	Killed a gay man who made a pass at him in 1986. Sentenced to 10 years' imprisonment, he was released in 1993. Re-incarcerated in 1998 following a robbery, he escaped from prison in 2007 and killed a man in the company of a former cellmate. Sentenced to life imprisonment, he killed a fellow inmate in 2017 and had his sentence extended.	
Stranieri, Alfredo	1997–1999	4	4	Died in prison	Known as "The Classified Ad Killer"; Italian-born con man who committed two double murders and one murder attempt in order to obtain property or used cars	
Succo, Roberto	1981–1988	7	7	Committed suicide in prison	Murdered his parents in native Mestre, Italy, before fleeing to France and killing five more people	
Sydor, Michel	c. 1950–1993	3	3+	Died in prison	Known as "The Legionnaire". Sentenced to 5 years' hard labour for the murder of a prostitute around 1950. He killed his wife in 1961 and was sentenced to life imprisonment. Released in 1978, he killed a 7-years-old girl at the Vacheresse fair in 1993. Sentenced to life imprisonment with 30 years' security period, he died in prison in 2014.	
Tissier, Patrick	1971–1993	3	3	Sentenced to life imprisonment	Rapist who murdered two girls and a woman; his case and that of Christian Van Geloven influenced a judicial reform in France concerning infanticides and child killings	
Tomasini, François	1907–1913	3	3	Executed 1914	Shot two men in Volpajola, shortly after his release from prison for a previous murder	
Toumbou, Zaki Ali	2017	3	3	Sentenced to life imprisonment	Known as "The Barbarian of Montluçon"; killed three old people and raped a young woman with Dailami Attoumani in order to steal their money	
Vacher, Joseph	1884–1897	11	27+	Executed 1898	Known as "The French Ripper"; drifter who raped, murdered, dismembered and disemboweled his victims across southeastern regions of the country	
Vérove, François	1986–1990	4	6	Committed suicide before any apprehension	Nicknamed "Le Grêlé" ("the pockmarked man"), Verove, a former police officer was blamed for four murders and a series of rapes since 1986. His confession was found on his suicide note alongside his body after he committed suicide in 2021. The crimes include the 1986 murder of an 11-year-old child, Cécile Bloch, in Paris.	
Waxin, Denis	1985–1992	3	3	Sentenced to life imprisonment	Pedophile who raped and murdered children in Lille	
Weber, Jeanne	1905–1908	10	10+	Committed suicide in prison	Insane woman who strangled children, including her own	
Weidmann, Eugen	1937	6	6	Executed 1939	German who murdered and robbed people around Paris, including American dancer Jean de Koven; last public execution in the country	
Zanchi, Honoré	1992–2009	4	4	30 years imprisonment	Known as "The Cleaner". Killed a man in 1992 to avenge a friend who had been attacked. Sentenced to 10 years' imprisonment, he was released in 2000. Killed three other men in 2008 and 2009 to avenge the death of his biker friend. Sentenced to 30 years' imprisonment.	

== See also ==
- Lists of serial killers

== Bibliography ==
- Burkhalter Chmelir, Sandra (2003). "Serial Killers". In Robert Kastenbaum (ed.). Macmillan Encyclopedia of Death and Dying. Vol. 2. New York: Macmillan Reference USA/Thomson/Gale. p. 1. Archived from the original on May 3, 2009.
- Morton, RJ (2005). "Serial murder multi-disciplinary perspectives for investigators" (PDF). Federal Bureau of Investigation.
- Hollandsworth, Skip (2015). The Midnight Assassin (1st ed.). New York: Henry Holt. p. 81. ISBN 978-0-8050-9767-2.
- Lane, Brian; Gregg, Wilfred (1995) [1992]. The Encyclopedia Of Serial Killers. New York City: Berkley Book. ISBN 0-425-15213-8.
- "L'affaire Prévost". La Lanterne (in French). No. 963. 10 December 1879.
