= André Pauletto =

French serial killer (1936–2016)

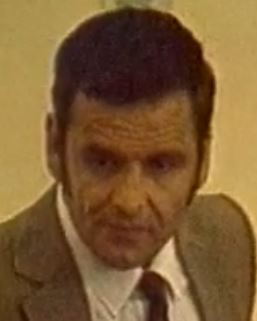
- André Pauletto, on 18 May 1981, during his trial before the Bouches-du-Rhône Assize Court.
- Born: André Eugène Pauletto; 20 April 1936; Marseille, France
- Died: 13 November 2016 (aged 80); Caen, France
- Other name: "The Monster"
- Status: Deceased
- Conviction: Murder x3
- Penalty: 7 years' imprisonment (1962); 20 years' imprisonment (1969); Death sentence (1981) commuted to life imprisonment (1982)

Details
- Victims: 3
- Span of crimes: 18 December 1960 – 20 October 1977
- Country: France
- Date apprehended: 18 December 1960 (first time); 23 August 1967 (second time); 20 October 1977 (final time)

André Eugène Pauletto (20 April 1936 – 13 November 2016) was a French serial killer, multi-recidivist killer and pedophile, convicted of three murders of his close relatives: his mistress in 1960, his wife in 1967 and his 10-year-old daughter in 1977.

At his trial in May 1981, Pauletto was at the centre of political debate because of his heinous crime against his own daughter, and was sentenced to death. Following an appeal to the Court of Cassation, Pauletto's conviction was overturned on a technicality, creating the Pauletto ruling. Retried in November 1982, he was sentenced to life imprisonment, the death penalty having been abolished in the meantime.

When he died in November 2016, he was known as one of the longest-serving prisoners in France, having served 49 years.

== Biography ==
=== Youth ===
André Eugène Pauletto was born on 20 April 1936 in Marseille. His older brother, Jean Pauletto, was born on 19 October 1929 in the same city. The Pauletto family were immigrants of Italian origin who arrived in Marseille in the 1920s. During the Second World War, Pauletto was sent to the bishop's palace, where he was severely medicated and lynched.

From the 1950s onwards, Pauletto began frequenting various places where he worked as a prostitute. He also frequented many prostitutes, with whom he had romantic relationships. In 1960, aged 24, he had a relationship with Anna Valentin, a prostitute nicknamed ‘Violette’.

=== First murder and first detention ===
On the night of 17–18 December 1960, Pauletto and Violette rented a room at the Hôtel Idéal in Marseille. Shortly after midnight, Violette announced her intention to leave him. Pauletto tried to convince her to stay with him, but she refused. Enraged by the idea of this break-up, Pauletto threw himself at her, grabbed a knife and stabbed her in the chest. Initially injured, Violette died after a short agony. By the time emergency services arrived, it was too late for the young woman. Placed in police custody, Pauletto claimed that he had not intended to kill his partner. However, he said he lost control after she told him she wanted to leave him.

On 19 December, Pauletto was charged with murder and remanded in custody. On 9 May 1962, Pauletto appeared before the Bouches-du-Rhône Assize Court. As the victim's status was illegal at the time, he was granted extenuating circumstances and sentenced to 7 years' imprisonment.

=== Release, marriage and second murder ===
Pauletto was released on 22 December 1964 after four years in prison.

In 1965, he met Lucette Baudry, also a prostitute. The couple soon married and gave birth to a daughter, Yvonne, on 7 February 1967. Pauletto was not happy about the arrival of his daughter, especially as Lucette was cheating on him with another man. He couldn't bear his wife's infidelities and decided to hunt her down.

On the night of 22 to 23 August 1967, Lucette packed her bags and left the marital home for good. Unable to bear this departure, Pauletto threw himself at her and killed her with thirteen stab wounds. He was arrested the same morning and taken into custody. In the same way as his first murder, Pauletto claimed that he could not bear his wife abandoning him and his infant daughter. He was charged with murder, a repeat offence, and remanded in custody. As for Yvonne, she was placed with her grandmother, Pauletto's mother.

In 1969, Pauletto appeared before the Bouches-du-Rhône Assize Court. During the trial, he said that he had killed his wife because she was about to leave him, and pleaded a crime of passion because his wife had been unfaithful to him. Here again, the victim's status as a prostitute played into Pauletto's hands. At the end of the trial, the court ruled in favour of the crime of passion and sentenced him to 20 years' imprisonment.

Incarcerated at the Baumettes prison, Pauletto was transferred to the Muret detention centre, where he was described as a model prisoner. While he was still being held there, his mother died. Pauletto's brother Jean was granted custody of the child, on condition that she stayed in a medical and educational institute. Jean visited her every fortnight, but touched her while André was still serving his sentence.

=== Temporary leave and third murder ===
Between August and October 1977, Pauletto was granted eight temporary absences, during which he visited the MPI to see his daughter Yvonne, now aged 10. He then learnt that she had been sexually abused by Jean when he was visiting her.

On 20 October, during his ninth leave, Pauletto went to the MPI again. Taking advantage of a moment alone with his daughter, he raped her, then strangled her to death, before dismembering her body. Pauletto then hid the remains in an iron trunk. Noticing that Yvonne was missing, the I.M.P. set out to find her. The girl's body was discovered in the trunk, with numerous signs of violence. The autopsy concluded that the murder had been preceded by rape. Pauletto was immediately arrested and taken into custody. He admitted to killing his daughter after learning that Jean was sexually assaulting her. Jean was arrested in turn and admitted to sexually abusing the girl. André was charged with murder, a repeat offence, causing bodily harm, and rape of a minor. Jean was charged only with sexual abuse of a minor. Both were remanded in custody.

The case caused quite a stir in the local press, because of Pauletto's profile: a multi-recidivist killer, twice a murderer in the past. He was even nicknamed the ‘monster’.

=== Trial and conviction ===
On 18 May 1981, Jean and André Pauletto went on trial before the Bouches-du-Rhône Assize Court.

At his trial, André Pauletto said he regretted what he had done and described himself as a ‘monster’. However, he said he felt obliged to kill Yvonne to protect her from Jean's repeated sexual abuse. When questioned about the sexual abuse, he admitted touching but denied any penetration. As for André, the psychiatrists stressed that he required treatment that the prison administration was unable to provide. Despite the election of François Mitterrand a few days earlier, the court decided to request the death penalty for André, even though it had little chance of succeeding.

On 21 May, André was sentenced to death, while Jean was sentenced to 7 years' imprisonment. Pauletto and his lawyer appealed to the French Court of Cassation, which, on 21 April 1982, overturned the judgement on the grounds that the acts of rape committed before 23 December 1980, were considered indecent assault and did not warrant a conviction on this ground. This decision by the Court of Cassation - which was a first - gave rise to the Pauletto ruling. In the meantime, the death penalty had been abolished.

Pauletto was retried by the Gard Assize Court from 15 to 18 November 1982. At this trial, Pauletto's criminal responsibility was confirmed, despite his troubled past and debates over the application of Article 64 of the Criminal Code concerning crimes committed in a state of insanity. Despite acknowledging his mental disorder, Pauletto was sentenced to life imprisonment.

=== The second longest prison sentence in France ===
In 1989, journalist Frédérique Lebelley visited Pauletto at Caen Prison to question him about his crimes. He told her that he intended to serve his sentence to the end, rejecting any idea of suicide.

"Without expecting anything, because I have no right to anything. I'm so ashamed of what I've done that I don't claim anything."

- André Pauletto

Releasable from October 1992, Pauletto never applied for his release, as he had said. After Lucien Léger's release in October 2005, he became one of the longest-serving prisoners in France, behind Pierre-Just Marny and Maurice Gateaux. From 2014 onwards, a number of media outlets began reporting that Pauletto was one of the longest-serving prisoners in France.

Pauletto died on 13 November 2016, at Caen Prison, after 49 years in prison. Including his first convictions, he will have spent 53 years of his life in prison. With 49 consecutive years in prison, he is currently the second longest-serving prisoner in France, behind Maurice Gateaux.

== See also ==
- List of French serial killers
