= François Tomasini =

Executed French serial killer

- Born: 1880; Venzolasca, Corsica, France
- Died: 23 December 1914 (aged 33–34); Bastia, Corsica, France
- Cause of death: Execution by guillotine
- Other name: "Cecco"
- Conviction: Murder x3
- Penalty: 5 years imprisonment (first murder); Death (double murder)

Details
- Victims: 3
- Span of crimes: 1907–1913
- Country: France
- State: Corsica
- Date apprehended: 11 January 1914

François "Cecco" Tomasini (1880 – 23 December 1914) was a French serial killer responsible for a double murder committed in 1913, committed shortly after his release from prison for a previous murder. He was sentenced to death for the latter crimes, and subsequently executed for them in 1914.

== Biography ==
Tomasini was born in Venzolasca in 1880, one of several brothers. According to locals, he was a problematic character who by 1907 had amounted ten convictions for offences such as theft, assault and battery. Nevertheless, he was married and worked as a day laborer in nearby Campile. In December 1907, he killed a 22-year-old man named Bacchia for a trivial matter, for which he was sentenced to 5 years imprisonment and a 10-year ban from visiting the town of the region of Haute-Corse.

=== Release and double murder ===
After his release from prison, Tomasini ignored the court-ordered ban and moved back to Haute-Corse. On 11 November 1913, he and a few friends travelled to the village of Barchatta, in the Volpajola commune, deciding to hang out at a local bar run by a Mme. Ciavaldini. In his drunken stupor, Tomasini asked another guest, an elderly man named Raffaeli, to lend him his accordion so he and his friends could sing together. Raffaeli, who was recently widowed, refused the offer, and was backed up by his friend, 79-year-old local farmer Roch Sarti. At that moment, Tomasini became angry, got up and slapped Sarti in the face. He then stepped back and pulled out his revolver, shooting Sarti twice in the heart and left arm, killing him on the spot.

Tomasini then vacated the premises and headed towards Sarti's home in nearby Canaja. On the way, he came across his daughter, whom he hit in the face, but allowed her to live. When he arrived, he called out for Félix Gabrielli, Sarti's 27-year-old servant who had known Tomasini for several years. When Gabrielli came out, he was held at gunpoint and forced to walk to the nearby roadside, where he was subsequently shot twice in the head and once in the pit of the stomach. After this, Tomasini went into hiding, with the local gendarmes launching a manhunt to capture him.

=== Arrest, trial and execution ===
Tomasini vanished from the authorities' radar for the next two months. On 11 January 1914, he was arrested in the village of Luciana, where he was being sheltered by a local named Ange-Paul Giorgetti, who was himself detained for harbouring a fugitive. Shortly after, Tomasini was put on trial for the murders, which he claimed to have committed in self-defence after Sarti had attacked him unprovoked. His statements were not believed, as several witnesses had seen him travel back to the crime scene, where he placed his revolver in Sarti's hands to make it appear as if the former had been the attacker. In an effort to prevent them from testifying against him, Tomasini's brother, Joseph, threatened to harm them, for which he would later be arrested.

On 26 July 1914, François Tomasini was found guilty of the two murders and sentenced to death. During his final statement to the jury and the court, Tomasini continued to profess his innocence and claim that it was done in self-defence. On 23 December 1914, he was taken to the local prison in Bastia and promptly executed in the early morning hours.

== See also ==
- List of French serial killers
