= André Robini =

French serial killer

- Born: April 29, 1928; Nice, France
- Died: June 28, 2001 (aged 73); Roanne, France
- Other name: "The Old Lady Killer"
- Status: Deceased
- Conviction: Murder (3 counts)
- Penalty: Death; commuted to life imprisonment; later pardoned

Details
- Victims: 3
- Span of crimes: 1955–1956
- Country: France
- State: Paris
- Date apprehended: February 28, 1956

André Robini (April 29, 1928 – June 28, 2001), known as The Old Lady Killer (French: L'assassin des vieilles dames), was a French serial killer who assaulted between 40 and 50 elderly women in the Parisian arrondissements and in Versailles between 1955 and 1956, killing three of them. A self-described gerontophobe, Robini was sentenced to death for his crimes, but was later pardoned.

== Early life ==
André Robini was born on April 29, 1928, in Nice, in what was described as an unhappy family. When he was a teenager, his mother suddenly died, causing the young Robini to quit his job as a baker and begin wandering the streets at night. Not long after, he was arrested for a minor offense and sent to a juvenile detention facility. After he was released, he voluntarily enlisted in the French Far East Expeditionary Corps's paratroopers division, where he attained the rank of sergeant and later fought at the fronts in French Indochina in the First Indochina War. He was demobilized in 1955, and while awaiting transfer to Morocco, he began his bloody crime spree.

== Murders ==
Robini's modus operandi was to stalk elderly women he had seen on the streets, initially assaulting them on the streets before he began to stalk them to their homes, where he would violate them without risking the chance of being caught. When he entered the chosen victim's home, he would then enter the premises by force and beat the victim, often gagging and sometimes stabbing her, then stealing their valuables and fleeing the crime scene. The attacks took place around the various arrondissements in Paris and in the neighboring town of Versailles, and he carried them out using a revolver, a sawn-off shotgun and his army issued-combat knife. From these assaults, two women were gruesomely killed and another died as a result of her injuries:

- Antoinette Broquerie (77) - an annuitant living alone in her apartment on Rue de Levis, she was found stabbed to death and gagged on May 28, 1955. Her carotid artery had been slashed, and Broquerie had been left to bleed to death.
- Marie Chenaud (77) - a newspaper saleswoman living at 42 Rue des Martyrs, Chenaud's body was found lying on her bed on January 20, 1956. She had been beaten on the head by her assailant, so much so that her skull had been dislocated all the way from the forehead to the occipital bone, but the cause of death was established as choking from the woolen rag that had been shoved down her throat.
- Marguerite Meurdrac (72) - six days after the Chenaud killing, the body of the retired journalist Meurdrac was found in her apartment on Rue de Montmorency in Boulogne-Billancourt. According to the autopsy, she had been viciously stabbed around 20 times in various places across her body, including the heart, with what appeared to be a commando knife. Like Broquerie before her, Meurdrac had had her carotid artery slashed as well.

In addition, between 40 and 50 non-fatal incidents were recorded during this time period, with the victims often escaping with minor slashes, stabs or gunshot wounds.

== Trial, sentence and pardon ==
On February 28, 1956, André Robini had assaulted another woman, but was caught in the act by multiple witnesses, including a PTT employee whom he threatened with his revolver. Robini then fled and hid in the sixth floor of a nearby building, situated at 9 Rue León. Not long after, the building was surrounded by gendarmes and two police vans, who managed to arrest the criminal without any resistance.

Several weeks after his arrest, Robini was brought to trial, where he was charged with the three murders and 13 assaults. He underwent a psychiatric examination, with the examining psychiatrist diagnosing him as a perverted gerontophobe without any regard for others' well-being, but nonetheless an intelligent individual. This was further verified by Robini's testimony before the jury and the judge, to whom he clarified that after each assault, he would use the stolen money to visit bars with friends and buy expensive drinks. He further clarified that he enjoyed killing the elderly, but couldn't understand why he did so. After two days, André Robini was found guilty and sentenced to death. When the verdict was announced, he simply replied that he had little to add, besides being remorseful for his crimes, asking for forgiveness from the public and saying that he wouldn't appeal the decision to the Court of Cassation.

Over the following two years, the case was rarely mentioned in newspapers, aside from a short segment in Le Voie de la Paix, where the Robini case was recalled as an example of the brutality of the French army commandos and their regime in French Indochina. On August 7, 1958, Robini received a pardon from the president, on the same day as another murderer, Jacques Sermeus. No information about him is available after the pardon, but in all likelihood, he was released after staying about 15-18 years behind bars (freed in 1978 after 22 years spent in jail, Guy Desnoyers, another murderer known as the infamous curé d'Uruffe, was mentioned by medias as the convict with the longest jail time) and he died forgotten in 2001.

== See also ==
- Gerontophobia
- List of French serial killers
