= David Lefèvre =

David Lefèvre may refer to:

- David Lefèvre (cyclist)
- David Lefèvre (serial killer)
