= Baptistine Philip =

French serial killer

- Born: Baptistine Favet
- Spouse(s): Bartholomew Philip (died 1878)
- Status: Deceased
- Penalty: Life imprisonment

Details
- Victims: 3
- Span of crimes: 1871–1878
- Country: France
- State: Provence-Alpes-Côte d'Azur
- Weapon: Arsenic
- Date apprehended: 1878

Baptistine Philip (born Baptistine Favet) was a French serial killer who fatally poisoned her employer, uncle-in-law, and husband in Aix, France, between 1871 and 1878 for monetary gain. Philip was caught after murdering her husband, when neighbours, who had long suspected Philip of the poisonings, went to the police with their suspicions. Experts examined the bodies of every victim and found large amounts of arsenic in all of them. The following year, she was sentenced to life imprisonment.

== Murders ==
In 1871, Philip was employed as a maid by a wealthy elderly woman named Madame Martin. In February of that year, Philip, who had been employed for less than a month, poisoned Martin, causing her to vomit and convulse until she died. At the time, doctors believed she died from cholera. Philip then claimed to be the sole heiress of the deceased and inherited most of her money. Furthermore, she ransacked her former employer's house, stealing francs and valuable jewellery. Relatives of Martin were suspicious after learning how little they inherited, but they did not report Philip to the police. Meanwhile, Philip boasted to others about her newfound wealth.

The uncle of Philip's husband, Lorenzo Philip, was a widower who owned a small fortune. After Lorenzo fell ill in 1876, Baptistine convinced him to move in with her and her husband. During this time, Baptistine cooked him meals and gave him medicine. On 30 June 1876, Lorenzo's condition worsened. He had a fever, the chills, and had a constant thirst. Soon afterwards, he began to unrelentingly vomit, and eventually died. Most of Lorenzo's fortune was inherited by Philip's husband, Bartholomew. Rumours began to spread throughout Philip's neighbourhood about her poisoning her uncle. However, neighbours once again did not report her to law enforcement.

On the evening of November 21, 1878, Bartholomew Philip fell ill in his bed and died in agony. Baptistine had previously persuaded him to make a will in her favour. This caused her neighbours to finally alert the police about their suspicions. Philip was arrested soon afterwards, and an examination of Bartholomew's body led doctors to the discovery of arsenic in it. The bodies of her two previous victims were exhumed, and the same poison was found in their corpses as well.

== Legal proceedings ==
Philip's trial started in 1879 and lasted several days. In court, she denied every accusation, arguing with the judge that the victims had not been poisoned. She also said that even if they were poisoned, she did not know where to buy poison, therefore she could not be the perpetrator. During witness statements, Philip was asked where the money belonging to Madame Martin had gone after her death. Philip replied that Martin had paid a large sum of money to a washerman before her death. When the washerman denied this, Philip shouted vulgar phrases at her, causing the judge to reprimand Philip. The doctors who examined the victims' bodies declared that they had never seen such clear signs of poisoning. The large quantities of arsenic found in the victims were then shown to the jury in glass jars. The judge also reminded Philip that she was the only person who tended to the victims while they were ill. Philip responded by saying, "I know nothing, only that I am innocent." The jury found Philip guilty on all counts with extenuating circumstances, and she was sentenced to hard labour for life.

== See also ==
- Mariticide
- Arsenic poisoning
- List of French serial killers
