= Jacques Fruminet =

French serial killer (1959–2014)

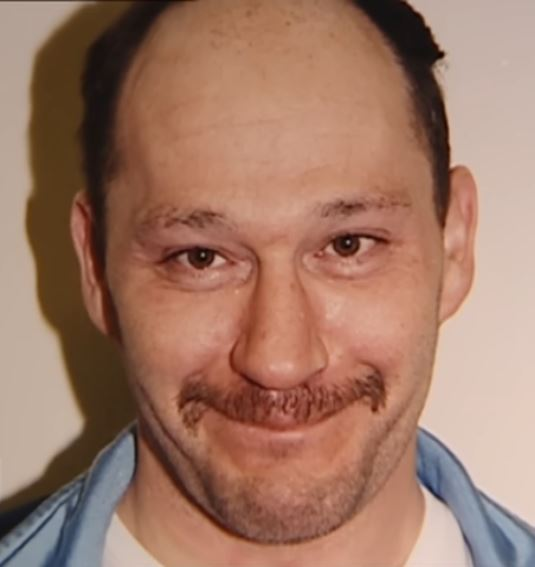
- Police mugshot of Fruminet, taken on 15 December 1998, a few weeks after his arrest.
- Born: Jacques Maurice Fruminet; 4 September 1959; Évaux-et-Ménil, France
- Died: 7 June 2014; Vandœuvre-lès-Nancy, France
- Other names: "The Man with a Thousand and One Faces" "The Killer with a Thousand and One Faces" "The Lady Killer" "The Jacques"
- Status: Deceased
- Penalty: life imprisonment with a 22 years security-period

Details
- Victims: 3+
- Span of crimes: 28 May 1980 – 20 November 1998
- Country: France
- State: Grand-Est
- Date apprehended: 22 November 1998

Jacques Maurice Fruminet (4 September 1959 – 7 June 2014), was a French serial killer and multi-recidivist criminal.

Fruminet committed his first murder in May 1980 at the age of 20. Sentenced to 15 years' imprisonment, he was released in June 1989. Three months later, he assaulted and robbed an elderly woman. Sentenced to four years' imprisonment, he was granted leave in December 1991, during which he sexually assaulted two women. Sentenced to 9 years' imprisonment, he was released in May 1998 and killed two other women on November of that year. Arrested on 22 November and then imprisoned, Fruminet was sentenced in December 2001 to life imprisonment with a 22-year security period.

He died at the Nancy-Maxéville prison on 7 June 2014.

== Biography ==
=== Youth and first convictions ===
Jacques Fruminet was born on 4 September 1959 in Évaux-et-Ménil, near Charmes in the Vosges. The youngest of seven siblings, he had a difficult childhood and grew up in a violent family that regularly abused alcohol. He says he was not loved by either his father or his mother. His father, he says, wakes him up almost every night to hit him and tell him that he only wanted six children: as the seventh, he is the victim of this ‘injustice’. His mother, who regularly beat him, lived with her husband and his lover.

Fruminet was a mediocre pupil, unable to read or write, and unable to get any qualifications. The villagers call him ‘crazy’ and describe him as a social case. He was placed in a medical-psychological institute to learn about the world of work: he was pleased with his stay, during which he learned painting and bricklaying, and flourished for the first time in his life.

When he reached the age of 16 on 4 September 1975, Fruminet was withdrawn from the medical-psychological institute at his parents' request. He proved to be a skilled bricklayer and earned a sizeable salary, which his parents and stepfather used in full to pay their bills and make purchases. In 1976, unable to bear being exploited for his income, Fruminet enlisted in the French Army. He was posted to Germany, to a unit in Wittlich and then Trier.

In 1979, he committed several violent robberies and deserted his post. He was caught and charged with these offences, but left at liberty. He appeared before the Landau Armed Forces Court on 7 June and was given a suspended prison sentence for desertion and theft with violence. He was discharged from the army for this offence. In October, aged 20, Fruminet was arrested for another robbery with violence. He was charged with repeated theft with violence and remanded in custody at the Metz-Queuleu prison. On 23 January 1980, the Metz Criminal Court sentenced him to eight months' imprisonment for these offences.

=== Release, first murder and detention ===
Fruminet was released on 27 May 1980, after seven months in prison. He returned to Évaux-et-Ménil, the village where he was born.

On the night of 28 May, Fruminet committed a murder. He went to the home of a 78-year-old local woman, Lucie Perrotez, widow Bottini, known as Andrée Bottini or generally Mme Bottini, and broke into her bedroom. Fruminet undressed her, tied her up, gagged her and strangled her to death. Thinking he had found a large sum of money, he made a mess of the room but only managed to steal 21 francs. After killing and robbing Mrs Bottini, Fruminet turns to his dead victim and tries to rape her. He left the scene and returned to his parents' home, where he spent the night.

On the morning of 29 May, a resident of Évaux-et-Ménil was surprised that Mrs Bottini had not opened her shutters, as she always did. Worried, the old lady's neighbour went to her house and discovered her dead upstairs. The village immediately suspected Fruminet, who had just been released from prison. According to the autopsy, the victim had been raped, as traces of semen were found on the quilt and on her body. Arrested that afternoon in Épinal, Fruminet confessed to killing the widow Bottini, but denied the rape, which turned out to be an attempted rape. The 20-year-old was charged with robbery and rape followed by murder and remanded in custody.

Fruminet appeared before the Épinal Assize Court from 15 to 16 June 1981. He was granted extenuating circumstances because of his chaotic childhood and was sentenced to 15 years' imprisonment. During his time in prison, Fruminet passed his driving test and a cook's C.A.P.: he was an exemplary prisoner who did not draw attention to himself and was noticed for his good behaviour. He married on 5 March 1986 at Ensisheim prison, but divorced after a few months.

=== Release and re-incarcerations ===
Fruminet was released in June 1989 after 9 years in prison, on parole for good behaviour. He decided to leave the Vosges and settle in Colmar (Alsace), where nobody knew him.

In September, having only been free for three months, Fruminet assaulted an elderly woman at Colmar station and stole her handbag. The victim lodged a complaint with the police station and recognised Fruminet when he was shown a photograph. Aged 30, he was arrested again, charged with theft and repeated acts of deliberate violence, then remanded in custody. He appeared before the Colmar Criminal Court on 20 February 1990 and was sentenced to four years' imprisonment. He was then considered "dangerous to society", but with a minor risk of re-offending, although he remained capable of committing acts reprehensible by law when he had the opportunity to do so.

In December 1991, Fruminet was granted two days' leave. Armed with a revolver, he committed two sexual assaults on women in Colmar: the first in the town centre and the second in a town car park. Following complaints from his new victims, Fruminet was arrested again, charged with escape, carrying a prohibited weapon, repeated violent robbery and sexual assault at gunpoint, and remanded in custody. He appeared before the Saint-Dié-des-Vosges Criminal Court on 27 February 1992 and was sentenced to 9 years' imprisonment. He served his sentence at the Ensisheim central prison, where inmates were described as "extremely dangerous" and "difficult to cure".

=== Release and new murders ===
Fruminet was released on 11 May 1998, after 6 years and 5 months in prison. He moved to Mulhouse, to the Foyer Espoir, where he worked as a caretaker. At his place of work, Fruminet tried to attack three women: an old lady whose neck he tried to squeeze, another woman he deliberately trapped in the lift and the cleaning lady who wanted to distance herself.

On the morning of 13 November, Nicole Kritter, a 41-year-old mother, disappeared as she left her home in Mulhouse. At around 5.30am, Fruminet held her up at gunpoint - the gun was never found - and tried to force her to have sex, which she refused. Fruminet then tied her up with electric wire and tried a second time to have sex, which she also refused. Fruminet strangled her to death before raping her post-mortem. He split the body in two, wrapped it in bin liners and tied it to two sewer grates, before dumping it in the Rhone-Rhine Canal. In the late afternoon, Nicole Kritter's husband Jean-Marc Kritter reported her missing, but the report was not taken seriously. On 17 November, Nicole Kritter's Peugeot 205 was found in a residential area of Riedisheim. The police found cigarette ashes, the front passenger seat in the reclined position, and the alarm had been ripped off.

On the evening of 20 November, Sylvie Arcangeli, 33, started her car in the Colmar station car park. At around 10pm, Fruminet stopped her and threatened her with his gun. He threw her to the ground and placed her on the passenger side of his car, tying her up and taking care to fold down the seat, with the intention of forcing her to have sex. When the young woman refused, Fruminet strangled her to death. Following this new crime, Fruminet puts his victim's body in the boot and sets fire to the car. In the process, Fruminet unintentionally burned his hands. The wreckage of the car was found the same evening, and the lifeless body of Sylvie Arcangeli was discovered burnt to a crisp. Superintendent Christian Aghroum, in charge of the case, opened a judicial investigation into the murder. The condition of the car suggested that the perpetrator had suffered a backlash.

=== Arrest and provisional detention ===
On 22 November 1998, Fruminet himself went to the police station, explaining that he had been attacked on the day of the crime. He said that he then went to the charred car to try to put out the blaze. Fruminet's behaviour was deemed ‘suspicious’ and aroused the interest of the police, who took him into custody. They discovered that the perpetrator was a 39-year-old habitual offender who had already spent more than 18 years of his life in prison. His multiple convictions were examined - murder accompanied by rape, robbery and sexual assaults - and his burns were consistent with the murder of Arcangeli. When he confessed to the crime in police custody, Fruminet stated that he had been in a relationship with the victim and then said that he had killed her because she had ended the relationship. At the end of his police custody, on 24 November, he was charged with murder accompanied by rape committed in a state of recidivism and destruction of evidence. He was remanded in custody at the Strasbourg prison.

Given Fruminet's background, the police quickly made a connection with Kritter's disappearance. Search parties were organised, but nothing was found. The police decided to sound the Canal du Rhône au Rhin. After three days of probing, the body was found at a depth of seven metres on 4 December, wrapped in rubbish bags and tied to two sewer grates. The similarity between the two cases aroused the suspicions of the police because, in the same way as Arcangeli, Kritter had been strangled and her trousers pulled down, suggesting that she had been raped. However, this hypothesis is impossible to verify because the body had been in the water for such a long time. What's more, the front passenger seat of the missing woman's car was lowered, as was the seat in Arcangeli's burnt-out car. In addition, Fruminet's workplace contained bin liners and manhole covers similar to those used in the crime. Apart from this material evidence, the investigators learned that Fruminet knew Kritter and that he had tried to seduce her.

On 14 November 2000, Fruminet was taken into police custody for the murder of Kritter. When questioned, he denied having killed her and claimed to have had a relationship with her. He claimed that Kritter had been harassing him for sex. According to him, she visited him on the day of his disappearance and committed suicide by taking antidepressants in his presence. Fruminet says that he panicked because of his criminal record, then weighed the body down and threw it into the Rhone-Rhine Canal. On 16 November, Fruminet was charged with rape and recidivist murder, and taken to the Strasbourg prison. Fruminet was referred to the Colmar Assize Court for rape and murder in the case of Kritter, and for murder accompanied by rape as a repeat offender in the case of Arcangeli.

=== Trial and conviction ===
Fruminet's trial opened on 10 December 2001 before the Colmar Assize Court. The accused, aged 42, appears to be suffering from obesity, having gained thirty kilos during his three years in custody.

The trial began in a heavy atmosphere. Arcangeli's family deplored the justice system's lax attitude towards the accused. Marie-Paule Debes-Lochner defended Fruminet. Thierry Moser is the lawyer for Kritter's family. On the second day of the trial, an elderly woman whom Fruminet had assaulted in December 1991 testified about her fear and the weapon he had used to make her submit to him. On the third day of the trial, Fruminet lost his temper and verbally attacked the journalist Roland Dinkel, calling him pretentious. He tried to step over the line of the court but was held back by the police. His version of the murder and rape of Kritter was changed: he claimed that he had forced her to swallow the antidepressants. Psychiatrists were unanimous about Fruminet's personality: they all described him as an ‘incurable pervert’ and ‘unadaptable’.

On 14 December, Jacques Fruminet was sentenced to life imprisonment with a 22-year security period.

=== Death ===
Fruminet died on 7 June 2014 at the Nancy-Maxéville prison in Vandœuvre-lès-Nancy. Detained since November 1998, he could have applied for parole from November 2020. He has spent almost 34 years of his life in prison.

== A man with a thousand and one faces ==
Among the archives and documentaries tracing Fruminet's career, everyone is struck by the change in his face over the months or years of the investigations. In the programme Faites entrer l'accusé, broadcast in December 2008, journalist Christophe Hondelatte referred to this change in physical appearance as the characteristic of a person capable of blending into the crowd. Fruminet could be classified as a serial killer for several reasons:

- he is helpful and kind in the eyes of his friends;
- he has a permanent job;
- he takes pleasure in committing his crimes;
- he pulls down his victims' trousers after killing them.
- he returns to work after his crimes, as if nothing had happened;
- his behaviour in custody is beyond reproach;
- his discreet behaviour makes him unsuspected.

== See also ==
- List of French serial killers
