= Bernard Pesquet =

Convicted French serial killer

- Born: 18 March 1922; Heugleville-sur-Scie, France
- Died: 10 May 2009 (aged 87); Fresnes Prison, Fresnes, France
- Other name: "The Landru of Val-d'Oise"
- Conviction: Murder x6
- Penalty: Life imprisonment x3

Details
- Victims: 6+
- Span of crimes: 1941; 1974 – 1976
- Country: France
- States: Seine-Maritime, Val-d'Oise, Hauts-de-Seine
- Date apprehended: 30 July 1976

Bernard Pesquet (18 March 1922 – 10 May 2009), known as The Landru of Val-d'Oise, was a French serial killer who killed at least six people between 1941 and 1976. Spending a total of 53 years behind bars, he was sentenced to life imprisonment for the latter murders, dying in prison in 2009.

== Early life ==
Bernard Pesquet was born on 18 March 1922, in Heugleville-sur-Scie. When his mother died, he was brought up by his maternal grandfather until 1931, after being relentlessly rejected by the latter's partner.

In 1936, at the age of 14, Bernard Pesquet was sent to boarding school for a period of four months. His first job was in a glass factory, but gave up after a year.

In 1938, at the age of 16, Bernard Pesquet joined his uncle in Rouen to become a cook, but quit his job a month later.

On 29 September 1939, he was arrested on charges of shoplifting but was later acquitted.

On 18 March 1940, his 18th birthday, Bernard Pesquet passed his radio electrician exam. He obtained his emancipation and then moved into a two-room apartment, 95, Rue aux Ours, which he made both his home and his workshop. In the district, Pesquet was nicknamed "the little electrician".

In June 1940, Pesquet was required to work at the German Soldier's Foyer. Every morning, a black Citroën Traction Avant came to pick him up in order to carry out several repairs in the various depots and buildings in the city. Bernard Pesquet did his job with the awareness and skill known by everyone. Pesquet, tossed about by events that went beyond him, seemed not to ask himself any questions, so others described him as "mysterious".

In 1941, at the age of 19, Bernard Pesquet met a certain Julien Quibel, a young man in his twenties, who quickly became his lover. Pesquet later explained that he had discovered that Quibel was a collaborator on the side of the Germans.

== Murders ==
=== First murder ===
On 22 August 1941, in Rouen at around 11 p.m., Bernard Pesquet beat Julien Quibel to death with an iron bar and slashed his veins with a razor. Having no possibility of defending himself against his lover, Quibel died of his wounds. The body was found the next day, not far from Pesquet's home. Bernard Pesquet was, at the time of the events, 19 years old and was quickly suspected by those close to Quibel because of their romantic relationship.

Arrested on 25 August 1941, Pesquet played against the police. It was not until the third day of his custody that he confessed to having killed Quibel. Pesquet specified that he killed Quibel to steal his savings and his money, and also because he collaborated with the Germans. He was imprisoned for the murder of his friend. Bernard Pesquet, being over sixteen at the time, faced the death penalty, even if it had little chance of being applied because Pesquet was still a minor (legal adulthood being set at 21 years old at the time).

On 8 November 1941, Bernard Pesquet was sentenced to hard labour for life. As a minor, he escaped the death penalty. At that time, life imprisonment did not allow the possibility of release. Bernard Pesquet expected to die, during his life sentence of hard labour.

=== Detention ===
On 18 March 1943, Bernard Pesquet reached adulthood. At the start of Pesquet's incarceration, France was at war and many prisoners were starving to death in detention. However, Bernard Pesquet managed to survive these daily famines due to his young age. Having retracted his crime in the meantime, Pesquet also requested a review of his trial on 28 December 1944.

On 8 May 1945, as World War II ended, prison conditions improved for Pesquet, then 23 years old. The young inmate subsequently received the result of his request from the court of revision which, considering Bernard Pesquet's retractions as a means of release, rejected Pesquet's request in July 1945.

In 1951, the sentence reductions were introduced. Pesquet had already served ten years in prison, when he was only 29 years old.

On 4 June 1960, penal labour was abolished in France, and Pesquet's sentence was automatically converted to a life sentence with a chance of parole. Pesquet was considered a likely candidate for release, as he was a model inmate with a clean record according to the Prison Administration.

=== Release and presumed respite ===
On 12 October 1961, Pesquet was paroled after serving a 20-year sentence, returning to mainland France. Aged 39, he said he was "happy" to finally be able to build a life for himself. He also became a self-employed painter.

In the mid-1960s, he met Christiane Ruaux, who was 19 years his junior, whom he married in December 1968.

From the early 1970s, Christiane Pesquet began to run away when disputes broke out with Bernard Pesquet. She was described as a "fickle woman".

In December 1972, the Pesquet couple began a move to Pierrelaye and settled there at the beginning of 1973.

In 1974, after only 5 1/2 years of marriage, Christiane Pesquet discovered her husband's criminal past as well as his homosexuality. Bernard Pesquet was bisexual and learned that his wife wished to leave him, then became suspicious of her.

=== The Landru of Val-d'Oise ===
==== Serial murders ====
On 23 November 1974, Bernard Pesquet ambushed his wife Christiane, 33, and killed her with a 7.65 mm rifle. Following this, he left her in agony until her death and then buried her corpse under a meter of earth in his second basement, at his home in Pierrelaye. In the days following the murder of his wife, Bernard Pesquet, questioned by the neighbourhood, pretended his wife had run away again, following an umpteenth argument between the couple.

On 28 January 1975, Bernard Pesquet wrote a letter to the parents of his wife that their daughter had turned out to be a "fickle wife", "egotistic" and "spendthrift". Pesquet also wrote in his letter that he was sorry for the "departure" of his wife. Although the claim she had run away was credible, a missing persons report was nevertheless put out for Christiane due to a loan not repaid to her family. The investigation into the disappearance of Christiane Pesquet resulted in dismissal.

On 30 April 1976, Henri Franqui, a 52-year-old real estate agent, went to Bernard Pesquet in Pierrelaye in order to buy his house after several unsuccessful attempts in the past. Annoyed, Pesquet shot Franqui with his 7.65 mm rifle, then buried the body of his victim in the basement, as he had done with his wife. Bernard Pesquet, then financially ruined, subsequently used Franqui's chequebook to do some shopping and also sold the latter's car.

On 29 July 1976, at around 11:30 a.m., Bernard Pesquet went to Neuilly-sur-Seine to visit a retired couple, Emile Bergaud, 71, his wife Alice Bergaud, 73, as well as their servant Alfeia Borgioni, aged 63. Under the pretext of repainting the house of the retired couple, Pesquet, being again in debt, killed the Bergaud couple as well as Mrs. Borgioni, using his 7.65 mm rifle, before stealing the booty and valuables and goods. He left without anyone stopping him. Upon the discovery of the three bloodied corpses, Commissioner Claude Cancès was immediately captured by this homicide case. When they arrived at the scene, the police discovered that Ms. Bergaud had received a letter from Bernard Pesquet, in which the latter had announced that he was coming to the couple's home.

On 30 July 1976, knowing that Bernard Pesquet lived in the region, the gendarmes went to his home for his testimony. But, upon the police learning that Pesquet had already spent 20 years of his life in prison for murder, they decided to immediately place him in custody. Bernard Pesquet, having been free for fifteen years, was the ideal culprit. Jewels and gold bars belonging to the Bergaud couple were found at Pesquet's home, but the 54-year-old man remained silent on the triple murder in Neuilly-sur-Seine.

==== Detention and end of death penalty ====
On 1 August 1976, Bernard Pesquet was imprisoned for the triple murder of the Bergaud couple and their servant. Although he denied it, Pesquet faced the death penalty. However, the gendarmes, including Claude Cancès, suspected him of being at the origin of several suspicious and unresolved disappearances, including the disappearance of his wife which occurred less than two years earlier.

On 11 August 1976, the investigators renewed their search and found the skeletal body of Christiane Pesquet, as well as that of Henri Franqui in advanced decomposition. Cornered, Bernard Pesquet confessed to the two murders and was charged with them. Pesquet immediately earned the nickname of "Landru du Val-d'Oise," because of his modus operandi resembling that of Landru; a modus operandi that had served him to kill his wife and his real estate agent. Happy to have indicted the repeat offender, Commissioner Claude Cancès and the other investigators were still convinced that Bernard Pesquet may have killed other people between his release from prison in October 1961 and his arrest in July 1976.

On 14 August 1976, Bernard Pesquet tried to escape but, aged 54, Pesquet was immediately overpowered by prison guards who intervened. Prosecuted for the murders of five people, Bernard Pesquet immediately knew he was facing the death penalty, which had become a sort of "lottery" for criminals.

Between 1977 and 1979, Bernard Pesquet and his lawyers tried, as best they could, to plead insanity in order to obtain the penal irresponsibility of Pesquet and avoid the death penalty. The defence of the accused was based on the fact that Bernard Pesquet began to paint various pictures with, according to the defence, different "disconnections from reality", thus being able to suggest that Pesquet had schizophrenia. However, the psychiatric experts contested the defence request, showing that Bernard Pesquet was seeking to delay his judgment in order to avoid the guillotine. Following Pesquet's manipulations, the psychiatric experts thus proved that he was aware of his crimes and that he did not have any mental illness, therefore holding him responsible for his acts.

In 1980, aged 58, Bernard Pesquet was referred to the Assize Court of Val-d'Oise.

The death penalty was finally abolished on 9 October 1981, by Robert Badinter, who became Keeper of the Seals. Since the trials of Bernard Pesquet had not yet taken place at that time, Pesquet now faced life imprisonment.

=== Trial ===
On 18 June 1982, Bernard Pesquet was tried for the murders of Christiane Pesquet (23 November 1974), that of Henri Franqui (10 April 1976), as well as the triple homicide of Neuilly-sur-Seine (29 July 1976). He was then 60 years old. The trial lasted nearly six years, which was the longest trial at this time. Tried before the Court of Assizes of Val-d'Oise, Pesquet played the "crime of passion" card vis-à-vis the murder of his wife, then confessed to having killed Henri Franqui because the latter annoyed him with the purchase request of his house. However, Bernard Pesquet denied having committed the triple homicide of Neuilly-sur-Seine. The death penalty having been abolished, Pesquet was sentenced on 25 June 1982 to life imprisonment.

Following his conviction, Bernard Pesquet lodged an appeal in cassation, which quashed the verdict under technicality on 12 July 1983.

On 17 April 1984, Bernard Pesquet was sentenced for his five murders but, affected by a prostate tumour, did not appear before the Court of Assizes in Paris. Hospitalized, Pesquet still plead his innocence for the triple murder in Neuilly-sur-Seine. Although he was not present during the hearing, Bernard Pesquet, 62, was again sentenced to life imprisonment.

=== Death ===
After spending 33 years behind bars, Bernard Pesquet died on 10 May 2009, at Fresnes Prison at 87.

== See also ==
- List of French serial killers
