= Antoinette Scieri =

French nurse

- Born: Italy
- Died: 1968
- Occupation: nurse
- Known for: killing patients

Antoinette Scieri (1890–1968) was a French nurse convicted of murdering her elderly patients.

Scieri was born in Italy and studied nursing at Doullens during World War I. She was arrested and imprisoned for fraud and theft in 1915 for stealing valuables and posing as injured men to receive funds.

After her release in 1916, she moved to Saint-Gilles in 1920 with her violent and abusive partner and began work as a private nurse. Deaths began in 1924 and continued through 1926. On April 27, 1926, she was convicted of poisoning twelve people with the herbicide pyralion. She confessed and was sentenced to death. Her sentence was commuted to life and she died in 1968 after being released from prison in 1960.

== See also ==
- List of French serial killers
- List of medical and pseudo-medical serial killers
