= Casimir Dankerque =

Executed French serial killer

- Photograph of Dankerque (center) during investigative experiments
- Born: 29 November 1903; Dainville, Pas-de-Calais, France
- Died: 13 August 1936 (aged 32); Arras, France
- Cause of death: Execution by guillotine
- Other names: "The Monster of Artois" "The Artois Killer"
- Conviction: Murder (4 counts)
- Penalty: Death

Details
- Victims: 4
- Span of crimes: September – October 1935
- Country: France
- State: Hauts-de-France
- Date apprehended: November 1935

Casimir Dankerque (29 November 1903 – 13 August 1936), known as The Monster of Artois (French: Le Monstre de l'Artois), was a French criminal and serial killer responsible for murdering four pensioners in Pas-de-Calais between September and October 1935. Convicted of these murders, in addition to other crimes, he was guillotined in 1936.

== Early life and crimes ==
Born in Dainville, Casimir Dankerque was the son of a coal merchant in nearby Achicourt. Described as an odd, sly brute by acquaintances, by 1930 Dankerque was divorced from his wife, separated from his three children, and jobless. His eccentric behavior was demonstrated after he had participated in a bicycle race in Arras: after finishing 22nd, the contestants were to have an aviation meeting, during which Dankerque parachuted in front of his astonished friends. On April 23, 1930, Dankerque was arrested for kidnapping a minor by an inspector who had caught him in the act. While behind bars in the Saint-Nicaise Prison, Casimir admitted that he burgled the local church in Arras on two separate occasions, stealing valuables from the trunks and desecrating the ciborium, as well as stealing more than 27 bikes in the span of two months. For all these crimes, he received a 2-year prison sentence.

== Murders ==
After he was released from prison, Dankerque survived by defrauding people and living in abandoned houses. Tired of his impoverished lifestyle, he turned to crime. Using the fact that he had delivered coal on behalf of his father's company, he picked and chose his victims from Arras and the surrounding area, most of whom were elderly pensioners and retirees. On September 23, 1935, after he had watched a movie in Arras, Dankerque travelled to a small house in Pommier, where two elderly widowed sisters, 73-year-old Zulma Delporte and 90-year-old Céline Demailly, were living by themselves. He snuck inside a cubicle and waited until nightfall, when the sisters were supposedly asleep. However, while he was stealing food from the buffet, he was surprised by Demailly, who was feeding her hens. She began screaming that there was a thief in her home and Dankerque kicked her in a panic, causing her to fall to the ground. He then took a big branch and proceeded to beat her with all his strength. In spite of her injuries, Demailly was still breathing, so Dankerque strangled her to death with a rope. After he had killed her, he ransacked the room for some cash and drank a glass of water, before Delporte entered. Horrified by the scene, she began to scream, causing the assailant to knock her down and begin beating her as well. After knocking the old woman into unconsciousness, Dankerque stole around 2,000 francs and immediately fled. When the crime scene was discovered, Zulma Delporte was still alive and driven to the hospital in Arras, where she died without regaining consciousness.

After spending the stolen money, Dankerque decided that he would strike another house, inspired by his previous success. He chose his elderly neighbors in Achicourt, 64-year-old François Duflos and his 63-year-old wife Adèle, as his targets. On October 26, he went to the Duflos household and knocked on the door, hid in a nearby bush with a stick, awaiting to strike whomever opened the door. When Adèle Duflos opened, she immediately recognized Dankerque and started screaming, prompting him to start beating her with the stick. Much to Dankerque's dismay, his weapon snapped and his victim was still breathing. Scared that passersby would see him, he dragged Duflos into the house, where he kicked her head in until she stopped moving. After assuring that she was dead, Dankerque started rummaging the house for money when he came across the wheelchair-using and half-dressed François. He attacked him as well, hitting him several times in the face and head, causing blood to gush out onto his clothes and the floor. After killing François, Dankerque stole jewelry and a total of 2,200 francs before fleeing from the crime scene.

== Arrest, trial and execution ==
On the day after the Duflos murders, Casimir Dankerque was arrested in a café in Arras and brought to the police station in Lille. When asked why he was arrested, the inspectors revealed that he had deposited 1,000 francs, jewelry and a ring at a pawnshop in Arras, which had raised suspicions. When asked where he had acquired this large sum, he gave several conflicting accounts, including that a fraudster from Amiens had supplied him.

Dankerque with investigators at the crime scenes

After the aforementioned jewelry was presented to him, Dankerque said in a calm manner that he was the perpetrator of both the Delporte-Demailly and Duflos homicides. He then recounted his crimes in great detail, speaking in an emotionless tone, ending it with a statement that he did not care that he was likely going to be executed. On the following day, he was escorted by detectives to the crime scenes, where he explained in meticulous detail how he committed the murders. When asked by one of the attending inspectors why he confessed to his gruesome acts, Dankerque revealed that he had been convinced by his lover, Suzy, on whom he had actually spent most of the stolen money. On the way back to the police station, Dankerque was chatting with the detectives when he suddenly revealed to them that he had planned another "hit" on an old couple in Warlus, after being told of their financial information from an unnamed debtor, but refused to clarify whether he planned to kill them or not.

Dankerque was put on trial, and throughout the proceedings he remained mostly silent, responding in simple sentences when he was asked a question by the judge. On May 20, 1936, he was found guilty by the jury and thereafter sentenced to death; in response, Casimir told the gendarmes guarding him in a low tone that it was "only natural". On August 13, he was woken up in the early morning at 4 o'clock to receive Mass and Communion, and after he was finished, he was driven to the execution site, where a large crowd had gathered to witness the event. At 4:55, Dankerque was guillotined. His execution marked the first time since 1891 that someone had been executed in Arras.

== See also ==
- List of French serial killers
