= Mohamed Faleh =

French serial killer (born in 1944)

- Born: 1944 (age 81–82); Maroc
- Other names: "The Axe Killer" "Bouraba"
- Convictions: Murder x3 Attempted murder x1
- Penalty: Life imprisonment with 22 years preventative detention

Details
- Victims: 3+
- Span of crimes: 29 September 1995 – 28 February 1999
- Country: France
- State: Bourgogne-Franche-Comté
- Date apprehended: 6 March 1999

Mohamed Faleh (1944) is a French serial killer. He was responsible for at least three murders and one attempted murder between 1995 and 1999.

Nicknamed ‘Bouraba’ by those close to him, the press called him the ‘Axe Killer’ because of the way he killed his victims.

== Biography ==
=== Youth and life ===
Mohamed Faleh was born in Morocco in 1944. He married in the 1960s and raised a modest family.

In 1970, at the age of 26, Faleh left Morocco and moved to France, leaving his family behind. He settled in Montbéliard, where he was employed in a metalworking factory. Faleh is described as a calm and exemplary worker. Faleh likes to collect female conquests. He even joked to his friends that he did not know how to refuse a woman. His friends call him ‘Bouraba’.

Faleh has a passion for PMU bars. While playing poker, his friends caught him cheating. Caught in the act, Faleh was constantly under surveillance during games and lost many times. He ended up in debt, owing 150,000 francs in 1997.

=== The facts and the investigation ===
On 29 September 1995, Faleh came across 82-year-old Anna Ratti in a bank in Audincourt and saw her withdrawing 15,000 francs. After the elderly woman left, Faleh followed her and entered her home. He took a knife from his pocket and slit the old woman's throat. Faleh then stole a cheque for 15,000 francs from the old woman, intended to pay for the tombstone of the victim's late husband. Faleh hid the body under the victim's car and left the scene, leaving the knife behind. The body was discovered by a child, who accidentally kicked his ball into the garage. A murder investigation was launched, focusing directly on the victim's bank withdrawal. The video surveillance system identified Faleh as Anna Ratti was making her withdrawal. Placed in police custody, Faleh denied any involvement in the murder of the elderly woman and denied having gone to the bank. He was brought before a witness for identification, but the witness refused to recognise Faleh. As there was no other evidence against Faleh, he was released.

On the night of 16–17 November 1998, Faleh prowled a car park in Belfort. He spotted Mohammed Sellami, aged 67, and killed him in the back with an axe and a knife. Following his crime, Faleh stole his victim's money and left the scene, leaving the weapons behind. The victim's body was discovered at 8am the following day. The victim's soiled personal effects were found at the scene. A lorry driver, parked in the car park, was suspected of the crime because of his proximity to the scene (30 metres). He was jolted awake by police bursting into his van. Placed in police custody, the driver stated that he had arrived at around 2 a.m. and had gone to bed at around 4 a.m. after reading a book. As there was no blood on his clothes, the suspect was released. Among Sellami's relatives, investigators suspected Niassa of having been jealous of him. Brownish stains were discovered in her flat. Niassa and her boyfriend were taken into custody, but denied being responsible for the murder. Analysis of the stains revealed traces of paint. The two suspects were therefore released.

On 28 February 1999, Faleh invited Abdelkader Chamrouki, aged 61, to his flat in Sochaux. Having borrowed 6,000 francs from Chamrouki, Faleh pretended to pay back the money and killed Chamrouki in the back with an axe. He then dismembered the victim's body, before scattering it in five bin bags. Faleh then threw the body parts into the garden of a building under construction in the town. He then returned home to clean up any traces of blood that could be traced back to his crime. Chamrouki's son was concerned about his father's disappearance and decided to report it. No investigation is launched, however, as the victim has just disappeared.

On the night of 3 to 4 March, Faleh approached Max, aged 31, and took him to his flat in Sochaux, claiming that he wanted to sell him cannabis. Max accepted the offer for 3,500 francs and decided to follow him. After making sure that Max had the money, Faleh brandished an old telephone directory, pretending to possess the cannabis on behalf of a third party whose telephone number he did not know. Max looks for the telephone number in the phone book, only to be hacked in the back by Faleh. Shocked by the situation, Max asks Faleh the reason for the blow, who tells him to keep quiet. When Faleh strikes him a second time in the neck, Max manages to escape from the flat. He then runs to the café du commerce and denounces Faleh to the manager, who knows him as a former customer who was expelled from the bar. Following his crime, Faleh flees and goes on the run. Transferred to hospital in a serious condition, Max miraculously survives his injuries. When questioned, Max tells of having been attacked by Faleh in the street. The gendarmes doubted this version, as no serious bloodstains had been found on the road. However, when the police searched Faleh's flat, they remained convinced that Max had been attacked by Faleh. The fugitive is now wanted.

The investigation took another turn on 5 March, after the discovery of a dismembered body in a rubble bin in the town. The autopsy concluded that death had been caused by a blunt object, possibly an axe and a butcher's knife. The investigators made a connection between the discovery and Chamrouki's disappearance.

=== Arrest, imprisonment and partial indictment ===
On 6 March 1999, Faleh presented himself at the Montbéliard police station. He claimed that he had attacked Max in self-defence because Max had tried to kill him with an axe. The gendarmes had serious doubts about this version, given Faleh's attitude, and decided to take him into custody: in their view, the fact that he had been gone for more than 48 hours was consistent with someone who had something to reproach himself for. For his part, Max was also re-interviewed, but was again put at fault when he told them he had been attacked in the street. Convinced that he is the victim, the police force him to tell the truth, under the pretext of having to release Faleh, who is suspected of murder. Max then admits that he went to Faleh's house because he was offering him cannabis at a reasonable price. He admits that he was attacked from behind while looking for a telephone number at Faleh's request. Given his young age, Max admits that he managed to flee to alert the nearby bar.

Despite Max's version of events, Faleh maintains his version of self-defence. However, the marks on Max's body show that Faleh was determined to kill her, although Faleh shows no signs of injury. In police custody, Faleh is also questioned about the recent discovery of bodies. He was surprised, but also denied being responsible. The gendarmes were convinced that Faleh was unaware of the discovery of Chamrouki's body when Chamrouki came to the police station. On 8 March, Faleh was charged with the attempted murder of Max and remanded in custody at the Montbéliard prison. However, his custody was lifted in respect of Chamrouki's murder because there was no evidence to incriminate him. Max was released and cleared of all suspicion.

Convinced that Faleh had killed Chamrouki, the investigators searched his flat. They found bloodstains that Faleh appeared to have wanted to clean. These were taken and compared with Chamouki's DNA. In April, the results of the tests came back: the blood found at Faleh's house was a match for Chamrouki's. Faleh was taken into custody. Faleh was taken into police custody, where he claimed not to have seen Chamrouki for some twenty years and denied being behind the murder. He also denied having dismembered the victim's body and claimed not to know where the body had been found. At the end of his period in police custody, Faleh was charged with the murder of Chamrouki and ‘harming a corpse’, and was taken back to the Montbéliard prison.

When investigators dug up Faleh's background, they discovered that he had already been a suspect in another homicide case: the murder of Anna Ratti in 1995. They quickly made the connection with the events of 1999, after discovering that the victim had been decapitated by a blunt object. On enquiring about Faleh's detention in police custody, the investigators discovered that a witness had refused to recognise him, probably for fear of reprisals. When they questioned this witness again, he initially denied that Faleh had been at the bank. The gendarmes then decided to warn him that Faleh was in custody. The witness then changed his story and confirmed that Faleh had been in the bank just before the crime.

On 5 February 2001, Faleh was taken from the Montbéliard prison. He was taken into police custody for the murder of Anna Ratti, but denied being behind it. He was again presented to the witness, who formally recognised him. At the end of his time in police custody, Faleh was charged with the murder of Anna Ratti and ‘harming a corpse’, and taken back to the Montbéliard prison. In 2001, the investigating judge ruled that there were insufficient charges against Faleh in the Sellami murder case and refused to bring him to trial.

=== Judgement in the Max and Chamrouki cases ===
On 24 March 2003, Faleh went on trial before the Besançon Assize Court (Doubs) for the murder of Abdelkaker Chamrouki and the attempted murder of Max.

The accused, aged 59, still denies the facts and appears to have a ‘provocative’ and ‘contemptuous’ attitude. On the stand, Max described Faleh as a ‘devil-eyed man’ and urged him to tell the truth. Faleh refused to acknowledge his guilt and called his victim a liar. With regard to Chamrouki's murder, he cries miscarriage of justice and conspiracy when presented with a trace of Chamrouki's blood in Faleh's wardrobe. It was established that Faleh's motives for killing his victims were linked to a financial dispute. He was then described as a serial killer with an obvious risk of re-offending if he were to find himself in similar situations. On 28 March, Faleh was sentenced to life imprisonment. Faleh appealed against his conviction, but his life sentence was increased by a 22-year prison term.

=== Judgement in the Anna Ratti case ===
On 24 November 2004, Faleh went on trial before the Besançon Assize Court for the murder of Ratti.

On the stand, Faleh vehemently denied the nine-year-old murder. Called to testify, the witness from the bank confirmed that Faleh had been present just before the crime. A former cellmate of the accused also testified to confidences made by Faleh while they were incarcerated at the Montbéliard prison. He also added that Faleh had confided in him that he had killed two other people, without giving the names of his victims. As at the previous trial, Faleh called the witnesses liars and denied having been at the bank at the time of the events. On 26 November, he was sentenced to life imprisonment.

=== Indictment brought 11 years after the events ===
In 2009, while Faleh had been in custody for 10 years, a new investigating judge was appointed in relation to Sellami's murder in 1998. She decided to carry out new forensic tests to identify the perpetrator's DNA. The seals were sent for analysis, but no DNA was found. The judge then examined Faleh's behaviour on the day of the crime and discovered that he had paid a taxi for 500 francs. When questioned, the taxi driver said that he had been surprised to see that Faleh had so much money, even though he was not used to it. He even said that he had asked Faleh about it, and Faleh had replied that he had won in a scratch card game in Sellami's bar. The investigators checked the bar's winnings, but found no winnings against Faleh.

On 30 November, Faleh was again taken into custody for the murder of Sellami, which had been committed 11 years earlier. As usual, he denied the charges and maintained that he had won the 500 francs in a scratch-off game. The examining magistrate brought fourteen charges against him and indicted him for the murder of Mohamed Sellami. Faleh was taken back to the Maison Centrale in Saint-Martin-de-Ré, where he had been serving his sentence for several years. Despite the absence of his DNA, the investigating judge decided on 27 August 2014 to refer Faleh to the Vesoul Assize Court.

=== Judgement in the Mohammed Sellami case ===
On 12 October 2015, Faleh's trial began before the Vesoul Assize Court (Haute-Saône) for the murder of Sellami.

Now aged 71, Faleh appears to be a ‘hardened old man’ and ‘contemptuous’. The accused still denies the charges against him and is once again crying ‘miscarriage of justice’. His lawyers insist that Faleh's DNA was not found at the crime scene. Called to the stand, the victim's son testified to an altercation between Faleh and Sellami shortly before the events, which had resulted in the accused being expelled from the bar because of his behaviour. Called to testify in his turn, the taxi driver repeated his testimony about Faleh, in which Faleh told him that he had won a 500 franc ticket by playing a scratch card in the same bar; this was confirmed as a lie by Faleh. The Court did not believe that Faleh had won a ticket in a bar from which he had been expelled shortly before the events. It therefore requested life imprisonment. For their part, Faleh's lawyers highlighted the grey areas surrounding this 17-year-old murder: the absence of DNA, doubts about Faleh's presence and the fact that the stolen money had never been found.

On 15 October, Faleh was sentenced to life imprisonment.

=== Life in prison ===
Although released in 2021, Faleh was still in prison at that date. He is now one of the oldest prisoners in France.

== See also ==
- List of French serial killers
