= Francazal murders =

Serial murders in France

- Conviction: Murder x4
- Penalty: Life imprisonment x4

Details
- Victims: 4
- Span of crimes: May – July 1989
- Country: France
- States: Haute-Garonne, Isère
- Date apprehended: 18 July 1989

The Francazal murders (French: Affaire des paras de Francazal) were a series of murders perpetrated near the 101 Toulouse-Francazal Air Base by four AWOL paratroopers (Philippe Siauve, Thierry El Borgi, Thierry Jaouen and Franck Feuerstein). Between 30 May and 18 July 1989, they murdered three women and a conservation officer, for which they were later found guilty and received varying terms of imprisonment.

== Crimes ==
On the evening of 30 May 1989, 23-year-old Isabelle Rabou disappeared near Toulouse; she had been drinking with her friends and slept over at one's house. The next morning, her parents and friends, worried that they hadn't heard from her, went to the Toulouse police station to report her disappearance, as it was unlike her to cease contact like that. An investigation was launched, but no serious leads were uncovered. Not long after, a charred car was found in a field not far from the Francazal Air Base: after examining it, it was declared the car was Rabou's.

Wishing to investigate the base's personnel, the police turned towards the gendarmerie, since ordinary members of law enforcement were barred from entering military bases. After examining the files of every paratrooper stationed at Francazal, the gendarmes found no incriminating evidence, putting the investigation at a standstill.

Then, on the early morning of 3 July, about twenty kilometres from Toulouse, a farmer discovered Isabelle's body buried in a field. The autopsy established that she had been sexually assaulted and promptly beaten to death. Immediately afterwards, the police and gendarmes staked out the Francazal Air Base for several days and nights, but nothing out of the ordinary was observed.

On 13 July, another charred vehicle was found in a field not far from Francazal; when the police made the first inspections, they found two bodies, both belonging to young women. Like Isabelle Rabou, they had been raped and beaten to death. Their identities remained unknown for the time being, but by then, authorities were convinced that the three women had been killed by the same perpetrators, who likely worked at the base. Police and gendarmerie patrols were strengthened, and after reviewing the employee files, investigators realized that two conscripts had recently deserted: Philippe Siauve and Thierry El Borgi, both 20. Arrest warrants were promptly issued for both of them.

In the early morning of 18 July, in Saint-Romain-de-Jalionas, 62-year-old conservation officer Marcel Douzet receiving a warning that some foxes had been seen in the woods; deciding to investigate, he ventured into the forest to see what was going on. Around 9 AM, worried that her father hadn't returned yet, Douzet's daughter called in the gendarmes to help search for him.

Throughout the rest of the day, hundreds of people including local villagers, policemen and an army helicopter set out in search for Marcel. At the end of the afternoon, Douzet's rifle was discovered in a cornfield; in the early evening, his body was eventually recovered deep in the woods.

Siauve and El Borgi, both natives of Saint-Romain-de-Jalionas, were eventually spotted by police in Isère and fled. Both the police and gendarmes rushed after them - after the two fugitives locked themselves in the basement of a house, the police expressly told them to surrender, with both of them complying. They were both arrested and then taken to Crémieu.

After being questioned concerning Douzet's death, Siauve and El Borgi admitted to killing him. They claimed that they had left the previous day from the base, going to Isère to visit Philippe's mother. There, they stole a car, and in the same evening, drove to a local bar and shot at a group of North Africans, before killing two cows in the countryside. Finally, while cruising around the city, they shot at a crowd of Arabs, but failed to cause any fatalities (according to Siauve, they shot at people of Arab origin because he hated "bougnoules"). Early the next morning, they came across Marcel while he was riding his bike. Philippe hurried to engage in conversation with him, while Thierry snuck up behind Douzet and shot him. He then threw Douzet's rifle into the cornfield, before both of them moved his body into the woods.

On 20 July, the two paratroopers were extradited to Toulouse to be questioned about their involvement in the deaths of Rabou and the two girls. When they arrived, Siauve and El Borgi implicated two other accomplices, Thierry Jaoeun and Franck Feuerstein. After their arrests, both men confessed that they had indeed participated in the murders. After investigating their pasts, the authorities determined that all four of the men had tragic childhoods. Siauve's mother had abandoned him at the age of 10, while El Borgi was born as the result of a rape. Before enlisting in the army, they had committed various petty offences as teenagers.

Siauve and El Borgi said that they had killed Rabou with Jaouen's help. On the evening of 31 May, they were wandering around Toulouse, searching for a car they could steal so they could return to the camp. By chance, they spotted Isabelle driving. They took her hostage, and at night, they drove towards Francazal, stopping in a nearby field. There, they beat and took turns raping her, before strangling Rabou to death. The trio then burned the car, and moved Isabelle's corpse to another field twenty kilometres from Francazal.

Afterwards, they explained how they had killed the two teenagers on 13 July. During a leave, they had wanted to go to a nightclub, which was closed so instead they went toward Toulouse, where a fun fair was being held. It was there they came across the two girls (identified as 17-year-old Noria Boussedra and 12-year-old Luisa De Azevedo) they lured the girls into their car and took them to a field. El Borgi started hitting and beating Boussedra, refusing to rape her as she was on her period. After strangling her, Siauve started hitting De Azevedo and raping her, soon after, he strangled and stabbed her in the throat with a knife. Due to the severity of the crimes, the four paratroopers were immediately indicted for four homicides, kidnappings, rapes and torture, and were immediately imprisoned.

== Trial and convictions ==
The four conscripts' trial began on 15 April 1991. They appeared before the Toulouse Assizes Court, providing no explanation as to what motivated their bloody killing spree. While they expressed some regret over killing the three women, none of them expressed any remorse when it came to Douzet's murder. They were indicted on 130 charges by the juries.

All four defendants received life imprisonment, with a chance of parole after 30 years for Philippe Siuave and Thierry El Borgi, 15 for Thierry Jaouen and 13 for Franck Feuerstein.

== Chronology of incarceration ==
Thierry Jaouen obtained supervised parole at the end of October 2008.

== Documentaries ==
- Bring in the accused, presented by Christophe Hondelatte, in April 2009 and August 2010, "The Paras of Francazal, a bloody trip", on France 2. (in French)
- Criminal Investigations: the magazine of various facts, on March 2, 2011: "The case of the paras of Francazal, a murderous spree", on W9. (in French)

== Radio broadcast ==
- "The case of the paratroopers of Francazal" (January 20, 2014) in L'heure du crime, hosted by Jacques Pradel on RTL.

== See also ==
- List of French serial killers
- List of serial killers by country
