= Véronique Frantz =

Executed French serial killer

- Born: c. 1825; Maisonsgoutte, Bas-Rhin, France
- Died: August 3, 1854 (aged 28–29); Barr, Bas-Rhin, France
- Cause of death: Execution by beheading
- Other name: The Poisoner of Nothalten
- Conviction: Murder ×3
- Penalty: Death

Details
- Victims: 3
- Span of crimes: 1852–1854
- Country: France
- State: Alsace
- Date apprehended: 1854

Véronique Frantz (c. 1825 – August 3, 1854) was a French serial killer. While working as a maid, she poisoned the family of her employer with arsenic from 1852 to 1854, in an attempt to marry her male employer. After his death, she was arrested, charged and convicted of the three murders, for which she was subsequently executed in 1854.

== Murders ==
Sometime during 1848, Frantz was hired to work as a servant to the household of George Guntz, a winemaker who lived together with his wife, son and his parents in Nothalten. Despite her status as a housemaid, Frantz was treated almost as a family member by everyone in the household due to her diligence and hard work. However, she was also admonished for her domineering and at times brash behavior.

In late November 1852, after Guntz's wife Marie-Elisabeth Ruhlmann overcame an unspecified illness, Frantz was told by her employer that in the sad case that his wife would pass away, he would consider her as a potential pick for marriage. Desiring to become his mistress, Frantz started using the arsenic bottles stored in the house's attic to poison the food and drinks she served to the family, with her first attempt resulting in most of the family members developing symptoms such as nausea and profuse vomiting, but still managing to live. After this incident, Guntz's mother-in-law, 75-year-old Marie-Anne Kobleth, threatened to leave the house if Guntz did not fire Frantz, which he refused to do. Fearing possible repercussions, Frantz continued poisoning Kobleth's drinks until she eventually succumbed to her illness on December 1, 1852.

After Kobleth's death, Frantz regained full control over the family, as the remainder of the family was often sickly and weakened. The next tragedy came with the death of Ruhlmann, who died after suffering from the aforementioned symptoms on July 6, 1853. While no inquest was held on the cause of death, some of her close friends believed that Frantz was responsible in some way, but could not accuse her without substantial evidence.

Since her mistress's death, Frantz believed that she could now become Guntz's wife, only to learn that he had chosen to marry another woman from a neighboring village. Angered by this revelation, she continued to poison the food and drinks, often preventing Guntz from participating in the preparation of the upcoming wedding ceremonies. Eventually, Guntz succumbed from the effects of the poison on January 27, 1854, aged 44, leaving his father-in-law and six-year-old son, who both suffered more mild symptoms of the arsenic poisoning, as the only surviving members of the household.

== Trial, sentence and execution ==
In the aftermath of Guntz's death, local townsfolk became suspicious of Frantz, believing that she was responsible for his death. An autopsy confirmed this belief, with the coroners finding signs of lesions and inflammations associated with arsenic poisoning. The internal organs were then sent for examination at the University of Strasbourg, where a professor named M. Caillot confirmed that there were traces of arsenic in Guntz's organs. As a result, the bodies of Kobleth and Ruhlmann were also exhumed and tested, with the results showing that they had been poisoned as well.

While she initially denied responsibility for the murders, Frantz eventually confessed in the presence of overwhelming evidence and was charged with three counts of murder and two of attempted murder. At trial, she was extensively questioned by the imperial prosecutor, M. Dubois, during which she admitted to poisoning all three, but was dismissive of questions pertaining to her motive for poisoning Guntz. In spite of the pleas of her public defender, Maurice Engelhardt, the jury deliberated for only half an hour before returning with a guilty verdict on all counts, with the court subsequently sentencing Frantz to death on 17 June 1854. While the sentence was read out, she was described as cold and impassive.

While awaiting execution, Frantz is said to have completely devoted herself to religion, spending most of her time praying at the prison chapel to abbot Guerber. On the day of her execution, she was transported to Barr accompanied by gendarmes and the abbot. After being placed on the guillotine, Frantz gave a final prayer before she was executed in front of a small crowd. At the time, her execution was the first to be conducted in Barr in 62 years. Her final meal consisted of a cup of café au lait and a bread roll.

== See also ==
- List of French serial killers
