= Jean-Marc Petroff =

French serial killer (1962–2012)

- Born: 24 January 1962; Toulon, France
- Died: 17 March 2012 (aged 50); Fresnes, France
- Other names: "The Homeless Killer" "The Axe Killer"
- Conviction: Murder x4
- Penalty: 30 years' imprisonment with 20 years preventative detention (2000); 20 years' imprisonment (2001); 15 years' imprisonment (2006)

Details
- Victims: 4
- Span of crimes: 29 August 1995 – 31 July 1998
- Country: France
- State: Provence-Alpes-Côte-d'Azur
- Date apprehended: 31 July 1998

Jean-Marc Petroff (born on 24 January 1962 – 17 March 2012) was a French serial killer, convicted of four murders including that of Jean-Claude Poulet-Dachary, the right-hand man of Jean-Marie Le Chevallier, the Front National (FN) mayor of Toulon.

== Early life ==
Jean-Marc Petroff was born on 24 January 1962 in Toulon. He grew up in an unstable family, with a physically abusive mother and a verbally aggressive father. During their childhood, Petroff and his sisters were regularly beaten by their mother and whipped with dog leads.

In 1976, at the age of 14, Petroff discovered that he was bisexual. Unwilling to come out at school, he dropped out in the third year. He then joined the army in the marine artillery in Rennes. He was described as "a withdrawn boy" and had few friends. When Petroff was arrested for theft, his parents broke off all contact with him, though he remained close with his sisters.

Petroff's sister described him as "a very sensitive boy" who loved children, and dreamed of building a home with a stable wife. He began a relationship in the 1980s, and regularly physically abused his girlfriend because she didn't know how to cook or clean. On 3 August 1993, Petroff kicked his partner out, and between September 1993 and August 1995, he had a homosexual relationship with Jean-Claude Poulet-Dachary, the right-hand man of Jean-Marie Le Chevallier, the Front National (FN) mayor of Toulon.

== Murders ==
On 29 August 1995, Poulet-Dachary was found dead at the foot of the stairs in his apartment block. Evidence at the scene indicated that the cause of death was a fall down the stairs. A resident of the building testified that an old lady had had to move out because of it. The investigation into the death was complex, with both an accidental death and a political crime being considered. The case soon attracted media attention, which prompted interventions from Le Chevallier and Jean-Marie Le Pen. On the night of 30 August, two members of the FN's Service d'ordre were inspecting the crime scene when they came across Petroff, who was parking his moped to enter the building. Questioned by the two men, Petroff replied that he had come for the same case. He then said that he had not killed him and left the scene quickly on his moped.

The next day, the two men reported the incident to Le Chevallier, but he refused to take the meeting into consideration as he considered the crime to be political. Petroff went to Toulon police station on 4 September to describe his relationship with Poulet-Dachary. When questioned about his movements on the night of his death, he claimed to have spent the evening with two lesbians. When questioned, they confirmed Petroff's alibi and he was released.

One evening in November, Petroff killed Alain Doridot, a 39-year-old homeless man, in the company of other rough sleepers in a squat in Toulon, after punching and slapping him. Petroff threatened to kill those present if they reported him, and forced one of them to help him take the body to an isolated wood in Signes, where he buried his victim. All of these witnesses denied any knowledge of what had happened to the homeless man when questioned by police, and were released.

On the night of 30 to 31 July 1998, Petroff invited Aoun Amarouche, aged 36, and Patricia Leblanc, aged 31, two homeless people, into his home on the ground floor of the Bon Abri building at 28 boulevard Alata in Toulon. As the couple slept, Petroff struck Amarouche and Leblanc with nine and ten axe blows respectively, then suffocated them to death with a tyre iron. He then tried to wipe traces of blood from the walls, floor and ceiling, but was unable to remove them all. Believing that he was being framed, he called the police to report the crime.

== Arrest, imprisonment and involvement in the four deaths ==
On 31 July 1998, Petroff was arrested at his home and taken into custody. A police search of the premises found the house filthy and covered with blood stains. The bodies of Amarouche and Leblanc were found disfigured with their skulls smashed in. When questioned, Petroff claimed that an argument had gone wrong. Detectives noted that he came across as 'cold' and impassive, showing no affection for the murdered couple, and cared more about the bloodstains than about his victims. At the end of his police custody on 1 August, Petroff was charged with murder and torture, and remanded in custody at Toulon prison. When a photo was published in the Var-Matin newspaper, the two members of the FN's Service d'ordre recognised Petroff and told Le Chevallier, but he again refused to believe it.

In April 1999, investigators reopened a judicial investigation into the disappearance of Alain Doridot in 1995. Petroff became the prime suspect because he was present on the last evening Doridot was seen alive. The investigators also suspected that others present on the night of the incident had played a role in the disappearance. They were all taken into custody at Toulon police station on 27 July. During questioning, Petroff admitted killing Doridot after beating him to death, and said he had buried him in a wood in Signes. The next day, the police went to the site identified by Petroff and discovered Doridot's remains. Petroff was charged with the murder and returned to Toulon prison.

One of the two members of the FN's Service d'ordre contacted a police officer he knew from the Intelligence Service regarding Poulet-Dachary's death. Based on his statements, the officer opened a murder investigation. Petroff behaved suspiciously during the investigation: he said he had not killed the day after the murder, and six days later he turned up to establish an alibi, in which he said he had spent the evening with two lesbians. The two young women were re-interviewed, and this time denied having spent the evening with Petroff on the night of the crime, removing Petroff's alibi.

On 13 September, Petroff was taken into police custody for the murder of Poulet-Dachary. At first, he denied being behind the crime, but was confronted with the retracted alibi from the two women. After several hearings, Petroff admitted that he had made a diversion to the victim's house to meet her. He said that he had been invited by Poulet-Dachary, but that the latter had reproached him for having seen the two women while they were on the stairs. Petroff then said that he had pushed Poulet-Dachary over the railing of the stairs. When asked where Poulet-Dachary was, Petroff replied that he was to his right. The lieutenant then told him that the victim must have been on his left if he had fallen. Petroff became confused and decided to retract his statement. On 14 September, Petroff was charged with 'assault and battery resulting in death without intent to kill' and returned to Toulon prison.

== Trials and convictions ==
On 22 June 2000, Petroff appeared before the Draguignan Assize Court for the double axe murder of Aoun Amarouche and Patricia Leblanc. Petroff did not explain his actions and claimed that the crime was linked to an argument between alcoholics. The psychiatrists who examined him found Petroff to have a psychopathic personality, devoid of feelings, and a high risk of reoffending. The public prosecutor requested a life sentence, reflecting the danger Petroff posed. The following day, he was sentenced to 30 years' imprisonment, with a 20-year security period.

In 2001, Petroff appeared before the Draguignan Assize Court for the murder of the homeless man Alain Doridot. He was granted mitigating circumstances and sentenced to 20 years' imprisonment.

On 11 December, while Petroff was still under investigation for 'assault and battery resulting in death without intent to kill' of Poulet-Dachary, the charge was changed to murder. The Indictment Division referred Petroff to the Assize Court on 8 December 2004.

Petroff appeared before the Draguignan Assize Court from 13 to 16 December 2005. The jury acquitted him, but he remained in prison for the other three murders. The public prosecutor appealed, however, and the case was referred back to the Aix-en-Provence court of appeal. Petroff was finally sentenced to 15 years' imprisonment for the murder of Jean-Claude Poulet-Dachary on 1 December 2006. This sentence and the previous one were combined with the first and heaviest sentence: 30 years' imprisonment with a 20-year security period.

== Death ==
Petroff died on 17 March 2012, aged 50, at the Fresnes prison, after 13 1/2 years in detention.
