= Poncé Gaudissard =

French murderer (1956–2019)

- Born: Poncé André Laurent Gaudissard; 25 September 1956; Marseille, France
- Died: 19 November 2019; Bordeaux, France
- Other name: The "Barbarian of Aix-en-Provence"
- Status: Deceased
- Penalty: life imprisonment with a 22 years security-period

Details
- Victims: 2-4
- Span of crimes: 23 December 2001 – 30 March 2003
- Country: France
- State: Provence-Alpes-Côte-d'Azur
- Date apprehended: 2 February 2004

Poncé Gaudissard (25 September 1956 – 19 November 2019), was a French murderer and rapist. Gaudissard was involved in two double murders, in 2001 and 2003, and a rape in 2004. However, he was not prosecuted for the 2001 murder.

Arrested on 2 February 2004, Gaudissard was implicated by his modus operandi and his criminal record (multiple rapes and sexual assaults, which he committed between 1973 and 1994). Remanded in custody, Gaudissard was sentenced to 30 years' imprisonment with a 20-year non-parole period (période de sûreté) in July 2008. After appealing, he was retried in March 2011. At the end of the appeal, his sentence was increased to life imprisonment, with a 22-year non-parole period. He had earlier been cleared of suspicion after DNA was mishandled.

== Biography ==
=== Youth ===
Poncé André Laurent Gaudissard was born on 25 September 1956 in Marseille. He was the second of four children. His mother was a housewife and his father a mechanic; the latter was an alcoholic who was violent towards his wife and children. The Gaudissard family is described as a modest one.

During his childhood, Gaudissard lived with his family in a small flat in Marseille. He was also the victim of a knife attack by his own father. His father's behaviour towards his family led to similar violence from the Gaudissard children, to the extent that Poncé ended up hitting his father with a chair. In the early 1970s, Gaudissard stopped dreading any punishment or coercion from his father.

=== First crimes ===
In 1973, aged 17, Gaudissard broke into the home of his neighbour, a 21-year-old mother of an infant. Gaudissard hid behind the bedroom door and lunged at the young woman, before taking her into the bathroom and groping her. In the meantime, the baby's bottle, prepared by the young mother, exploded due to overheating and Gaudissard, surprised by the explosion, fled back to his parents' house. The neighbour, who knew young Poncé well, did not press charges, but Poncé was reported to his parents and slapped in the face by his father.

In 1976, at the age of 20, he broke into the home of his employer's wife and tried to rape her. She reasoned with him and he gave up. Gaudissard worked as a postman for several years. He had fantasies of assaulting other young women he met on his rounds.

In 1979, aged 23, Gaudissard attacked a caretaker while delivering mail. Armed with a knife, Gaudissard broke into the concierge's apartment and lunged at her. However, he was startled by the sound of the doorbell ringing at the same time as the attack. He fled but was eventually caught. This was his first incarceration. Gaudissard was tried by the criminal court and sentenced to a year's imprisonment, four months of which were suspended. He was released after a few months in prison. In 1980, a few months after his release, Gaudissard harassed his victim by telephone. However, he was not prosecuted.

Until 1985, Gaudissard also continued to harass his first victim (his neighbour from 1973), in revenge for the slap he had received from her father at the time of the attack. Despite repeated complaints from the victim's partner and the arrival of the police at the scene, Gaudissard continued his relentless threats. He finally stopped after harassing the victim for 12 years.

Also in 1985, Gaudissard married and became a father. For several years, he seemed to have reintegrated into society and led a stable life for 9 years.

In 1994, Gaudissard broke into the home of one of his neighbours, then lunged at her and doused her with fuel. Gaudissard raped his neighbour several times and held her hostage to prevent her escaping. Following the attack, Gaudissard left his neighbour's residence and she lodged a complaint against him for rape and confinement. Arrested a few days later, Gaudissard was charged with rape and unlawful confinement and remanded in custody. He was 38 at the time. In 1995, Gaudissard was tried for the rape of his neighbour and sentenced to 10 years' imprisonment.

=== Release and Villeneuve-lès-Avignon incident ===
In 2000, Gaudissard was released from prison after 6 years. He was 44 years old.

In 2001, shortly after his release, Gaudissard appeared to show contempt for his sisters-in-law. As a result, Gaudissard harassed them by telephone, as he had done with one of his former victims. However, because he was one of the family's ‘close friends’, he was not prosecuted. He was therefore free and not subject to any judicial supervision. In June, after finding a job with a bus company in Aix-en-Provence, Gaudissard met his new secretary, Audrey d'Amato, aged just 23, who would later become one of his victims (she was murdered less than two years later). During this period, Gaudissard also began to see his uncle and cousin on a regular basis.

On the evening of 22 December, an incident took place in Villeneuve-lès-Avignon, at the home of Gaudissard's uncle and cousin: Laurent Gaudissard, aged 67, and his daughter, Sabine Gaudissard, aged 34. That night, Laurent was severely beaten on the head and mutilated 24 times with a knife that was never found. Sabine was hanged from the staircase banister by an electric cable. The house was then set on fire and the two bodies were burnt. According to the investigators (after Gaudissard's arrest in 2004), Gaudissard killed his uncle relentlessly, before killing his cousin by hanging. He is said to have killed them in revenge for a probable dispute with his uncle, who was 'target no. 1'. On 23 December, Gaudissard phoned his uncle and cousin, probably to establish an alibi that he was unaware of the possible double murder. As Sabine and Laurent could not be reached, Gaudissard went to their home and discovered smoke coming from the house. On arriving at the scene, Gaudissard alerted the fire brigade, who broke down the front door, which had been locked. The lifeless bodies of Laurent and Sabine were found in the rubble. When the police arrived, Gaudissard was questioned as a witness. However, due to a lack of evidence, Gaudissard was cleared of all charges.

The deaths of Sabine and Laurent were classified as parricide, followed by suicide. According to the findings, Sabine had knocked her father unconscious and then mutilated him, before setting fire to the house with a candlestick and then committing suicide by hanging herself from an electric cable in the house. Gaudissard was not suspected. Although he had a criminal record as a rapist, Gaudissard was not registered as a murderer. After these findings, the seals and evidence of the crime were destroyed. In March 2003, Gaudissard learned at work that Audrey d'Amato had just discovered his criminal record. He realised that he was on the brink of dismissal if Audrey were to reveal it to her employer, or if any of the bus company's employees were to find out. On top of this, Gaudissard was forced to pay compensation to his 1994 victim, but was unable to repay her. The fact that he was about to be made redundant made him realise that he would no longer be able to pay the compensation.

=== Double murder at Meyrargues ===
On the evening of 30 March 2003, Chantal d'Amato, aged 53, left her home in Meyrargues to walk her dog. Whenever she went out, she never locked her door. Meanwhile, Gaudissard entered the house. At around 10.30pm, Chantal d'Amato arrived home and Gaudissard lunged at her, before dragging her into his bedroom. He tied her up and then beat her. Gaudissard blindfolded her with plasters. It wasn't until 11pm that her daughter, Audrey d'Amato, 24, arrived at the house after spending the weekend with her boyfriend. When the younger woman arrived, Gaudissard lunged at her, then dragged her into the bedroom as well. Gaudissard tied her up and then blindfolded her with his plaster. Gaudissard attacked Audrey and mutilated her face with 29 stab wounds. She died instantly. After Audrey's death, Gaudissard again entered Chantal's room and slit her throat with his knife. Following the double murder, Gaudissard set fire to the home of his victims. He locked the door and shut the shutters before fleeing.

On 31 March, Christine Maréchal, a friend of Chantal d'Amato, was concerned that she and her daughter were not answering her phone calls. She contacted Chantal's partner, who was equally unhappy to learn that she and her daughter were not at work. Intrigued, he went to their home. When he arrived, he discovered that the door and shutters were locked. Concerned at this discovery, he called the fire brigade, who arrived on the scene a few minutes later. When they arrived, they discovered smoke billowing from the shutters and decided to open the window. When they saw waves of smoke, they decided to call for reinforcements, who extinguished the fire when they arrived, and discovered the charred bodies of Chantal and Audrey d'Amato. An autopsy showed that the two victims were killed before their bodies were burnt. Major Daniel Bianco opened an investigation into the double murder. When the bodies were discovered, Gaudissard drove past his victims' house. He stopped for around ten seconds, before continuing on his way to work.

In mid-April, the investigation was based on the assumption that the murderer knew the victims, because of the harassment that Audrey had suffered. Gaudissard worked at the same place as Audrey d'Amato before she was murdered, the Aix-en-Provence bus company. However, Gaudissard was not the only person with whom the young woman was in contact before her death. The investigation led first to Audrey's boyfriend and Chantal's ex-partner. Placed in police custody, they were cleared, however, because the DNA found in the rubble was not theirs. Traces of DNA found at the scene of the crime were then compared with that of the two victims. In May, Gaudissard was summoned to take a DNA sample. He claimed to have found out about the double murder, but said he had nothing to do with it. Following this brief questioning, Gaudissard's DNA was taken. He was not taken into police custody and was released after the sample was taken. He left the police station free, and none of the gendarmes noticed that he had a criminal record. Further, the DNA exonerated him from the double homicide in Meyrargues, as it was not the DNA found at the scene of the crime. Gaudissard was therefore not under any suspicion.

=== Criminal relapse and link with the Meyrargues case ===
On the morning of 2 February 2004, Gaudissard entered a block of flats in Pertuis, then cut off the electricity to the building. Muriel Montborgne, Gaudissard's 40-year-old sister-in-law, was alerted by the power cut and decided to go downstairs to see what was causing it. She opened the door to get down there, but just then Gaudissard jumped out and pounced on her. He hit her and threatened to kill her with his knife. Gaudissard tied her up, dragged her onto the sofa and raped her. Meanwhile, one of Muriel's neighbours heard her screams and alerted the police, who arrived on the scene a few minutes later. At the sight of the police cars, Gaudissard threatened to kill Muriel and then leaves, jumping from balcony to balcony. Once downstairs, Gaudissard found himself trapped in the ground floor garden. In the meantime, Muriel opened up to the police and described to the abuse she had just suffered, telling them that he has escaped into the enclosed garden of the residence.

Gaudissard was immediately arrested and taken into custody. Meanwhile, Muriel's husband learned that she had been abused by Gaudissard, and in turn alerted the police in Aix-en-Provence. He now suspected Gaudissard of being behind the double homicide in Meyrargues, and explained that Audrey d'Amato was his secretary at work. When Major Daniel Bianco received Montborgne's call, he quickly made the connection with the Meyrargues case. He made another connection, in relation to Gaudissard's paraphernalia (gloves, cords, lighter, knife, plaster), which suggested that he was preparing to kill Muriel, as he had done with Audrey and Chantal 10 months earlier. At the end of his police custody, Gaudissard was charged with Muriel's rape and remanded in custody at the Baumettes prison.

On 12 February, Gaudissard was taken from prison and placed in police custody for the double murder in Meyrargues. However, he claimed to be totally 'uninvolved' in the case and to have had an alibi on the day of the crime; this alibi turned out, however, to be an invention of Gaudissard's in order to exonerate himself. During his interrogation, Gaudissard spoke at length about his childhood, admitting that he had been marked by the violence inflicted on him by his father. He was held in police custody for 12 hours, before being released for lack of evidence. Gaudissard was then transferred to the Baumettes prison. Following the interruption of police custody, the investigators tried to find a motive for the double homicide in Meyrargues, in order to link it to Gaudissard. They were convinced of his guilt, because of his modus operandi. When they searched Audrey's computer, they discovered that she had uncovered Gaudissard's criminal past and that, knowing he was in danger of being made redundant, he would never have been able to repay the compensation he had to pay to one of his victims.

=== Indictment, new leads and proceedings ===
On 30 March 2004, Gaudissard was again released from prison. He was again taken into police custody for the double murder in Meyrargues. During questioning, Gaudissard continued to deny the charges against him. However, his modus operandi was directly established with his paraphernalia. When questioned, Gaudissard replied that he wore gloves because of the low-temperature days. He also said that he used the lighter to light the bus he was driving. He went no further in his explanations and said, after many hours of questioning: 'I don't feel guilty'. Following this statement, described as a 'semi-admission', Gaudissard was indicted for the double murder of Chantal and Audrey d'Amato and returned to Baumettes prison, even though the DNA found at the crime scene was not his.

In the weeks following Gaudissard's two indictments, investigators also discovered the existence of a third charge against him: the suspicious deaths of his uncle and cousin in December 2001. On discovering this, Commander Daniel Bianco questioned Gaudissard again about these events, but Gaudissard again denied any involvement in the alleged double murder. Although Gaudissard did not confess, he was investigated during his detention, and Commandant Bianco gradually became convinced that he was on the trail of a 'serial killer'. However, as the records had been destroyed, Gaudissard's case was dismissed.

Gaudissard was referred to the Assize Court twice. The first was for the rape of his sister-in-law, Muriel Montborgne, on 2 February 2004. Then, a few months later, for the double homicide of Audrey and Chantal d'Amato, committed on 30 March 2003.

=== Trials, convictions and DNA mishandling ===
==== Judgement at first instance ====
In 2007, Gaudissard was tried for the rape of his sister-in-law, Muriel Montborgne. He was sentenced to 15 years' imprisonment.

On 1 July 2008, Gaudissard went on trial before the Bouches-du-Rhône Assize Court for the double murder of Audrey and Chantal d'Amato. He was defended by Maître Guillaume de Palma. During the trial, Gaudissard claimed to be innocent of any involvement in the crime. The arguments of Gaudissard and his lawyer proved decisive in the trial, as the DNA found at the crime scene did not belong to Gaudissard. However, it was Gaudissard's former victims who described him as 'violent', "sadistic" and 'perverse'. During the trial, the various testimonies in the witness box were damning of Gaudissard.

On 4 July, after a four-day trial, Gaudissard was found guilty of the double murder of Chantal and Audrey d'Amato. However, he benefited from extenuating circumstances and was sentenced to 30 years' imprisonment, with a 20-year security period. Gaudissard appealed his conviction.

=== DNA handling error ===
On 3 November 2009, just as the appeal was due to go to trial in January 2010, the case took a new turn when the DNA present in the double murder turned out to match another man convicted of domestic violence: Philippe L., who lived in Compiègne. After Guillaume de Palma heard the news, he applied for release from prison, with a view to clearing Gaudissard on the basis of this new evidence. Following the discovery of this new genetic analysis, Major Daniel Bianco decided to investigate Philippe L. to find out whether he was an acquaintance of Gaudissard. He then investigated Philippe L. for several months in order to find charges against him. Meanwhile, Gaudissard remained in prison.

In October 2010, Philippe L. was arrested and placed in police custody. During questioning, he discovered that his DNA had been identified as that of the Meyrargues murderer. Upon hearing this accusation, Philippe L. collapsed and expressed his incomprehension at the DNA result. The possibility of an acquaintance with Gaudissard was considered, before being completely ruled out. His bank statements were examined and showed that he had not left Compiègne at the time of the crime. Following this, an investigation was launched at the Gendarmerie laboratory, which discovered that a handling error had been made between Philippe L.'s fingerprint and the one found at the Meyrargues double murder. Philippe L. was cleared at the last minute and released from police custody. Gaudissard, however, remained in custody and his trial was postponed.

=== Judgement on appeal ===
On 14 March 2011, Gaudissard was tried on appeal before the Var Assize Court for the double murder in Meyrargues. He was then 54 years old. The trial lasted five days (one day longer than the trial at first instance). During the trial, the surviving victims of Gaudissard's murders were again called to the witness stand, amplifying the cruelty that Gaudissard could display during some of his acts.

During the trial, the jurors examined the accused, who, faced with his contradictions, still denied the double murder. Gaudissard's personality revealed that, although he took various risks, his meticulousness altered a great deal of the evidence and left him in a position to re-offend at any time. Although he was not prosecuted for the suspicious deaths of his uncle and cousin in December 2001, the Assize Court remained convinced of his guilt. The jurors also noted that there was a clear resemblance with the d'Amato case, due to the profile of the victims (parent and child) and the fact that one of the two victims was 'target n°1' in both cases. They also established that Gaudissard had the personality of a 'cold-blooded killer', with the characteristics of a serial killer, even though he had 'only' committed two double murders, fifteen months apart. The Assize Court also demonstrated that Gaudissard would have been perfectly capable of murdering his sister-in-law had he not been surprised and arrested by the police that day. At the end of the appeal, the court found him to be 'extremely dangerous' and declared him 'difficult to cure'.

On 18 March, Gaudissard was found guilty of the charges of premeditated double murder of Chantal and Audrey d'Amato, and of acts of torture and barbarity against Audrey d'Amato. He was sentenced to life imprisonment with a 22-year prison term.

=== Death ===
Incarcerated in Bordeaux prison for several years, Gaudissard died there on 19 November 2019, aged 63. According to psychiatrists, they were convinced that he would resume the rapes and murders once released. Having died after more than 15 years in prison, he could have applied for release from April 2026.
