= Xavier Philippe (criminal) =

French criminal (born 1956)

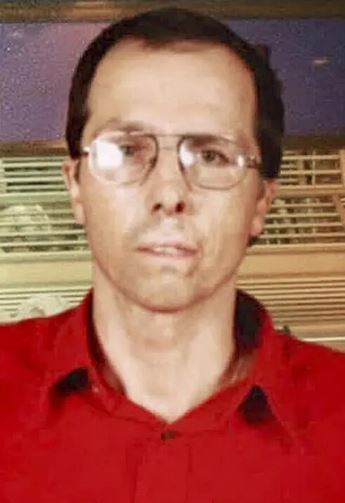
- Philippe in 2000s.
- Born: 8 November 1956 (age 69); Orléans, Loiret, France
- Other name: "The Serial Killer of Associates"
- Convictions: First degree murder x1 Third degree murder x1
- Penalty: 30 years' imprisonment

Details
- Victims: 2–4
- Span of crimes: 18 November 1988 – 17 May 2005
- Country: France
- States: Centre-Val de Loire, Île-de-France
- Date apprehended: 29 November 2005

Xavier Philippe (born 8 November 1956 in Orléans) is a French serial killer and criminal.

Philippe was suspected of killing three of his associates, attempting to kill another, and deliberately killing a pensioner between 1988 and 2005. These suspicions earned him the nickname 'serial killer of associates'.

In July 2008, Philippe was sentenced to 30 years in prison for murdering his associate, a pastry chef in the Marais district of Paris, in 2005. This sentence was upheld on appeal in June 2010.

After the case against him for the 1988 murder was dismissed and he was acquitted of the 1998 attempted murder, Philippe was released from prison in February 2025.

== Biography ==
=== Youth and life ===
Xavier Philippe was born on 8 November 1956 in Orléans, a few minutes before his twin brother, Bertrand. He was raised in a middle-class family in the same community.

In 1971, at age 14, Philippe developed a passion for business, he bought and refurbished old mopeds, which he would then resell.

As an adult, his appearance was distinguishable by his hoarse voice—caused by a crushed chest from a plane crash—as well as facial burns caused by a suicide attempt in which he tried to set himself on fire.

He gained a vocational qualification in car bodywork and founded a karate club with several hundred members. Philippe went into the fur trade, while also managing a restaurant-nightclub on a barge in Orléans. Philippe felt ‘crushed’ by his brother Bertrand's success and was extremely jealous of him. His business ventures were very similar to those of his twin brother and to Tony Gomez, a French nightclub businessman. The latter stated, 'As soon as we had something, he wanted to copy us.'

On the night of August 21, 1982, Philippe set fire to his brother's and his partner's nightclub in Orléans. Seriously burned, he went to a hospital to have his injuries treated. Investigators searched the hospitals and quickly identified Philippe because of his burns caused by the fire. Placed in police custody, Philippe admitted to attempting suicide and stated that he had burned down the nightclub to ensure his death. He denied any intention of killing his twin brother. For these acts, he was sentenced to three years in prison before being released in 1984.

In 1989, their mother organised a reconciliation between Tony Gomez, Xavier and Bertrand, and the three of them founded Banana Café, a gay nightclub in the Les Halles district. Philippe later found himself in court after shooting at young people at another nightclub in the city and served time in prison. He set up a transport company in Paris before being imprisoned again for trailer theft and carrying prohibited weapons. In 2000, Philippe became the manager of a bakery and pastry shop, partnering with Christophe Belle. They opened ‘l'Avion Délices’ in the Marais district of Paris.

=== Attempted murder of Grégory C. and Tony Gomez ===
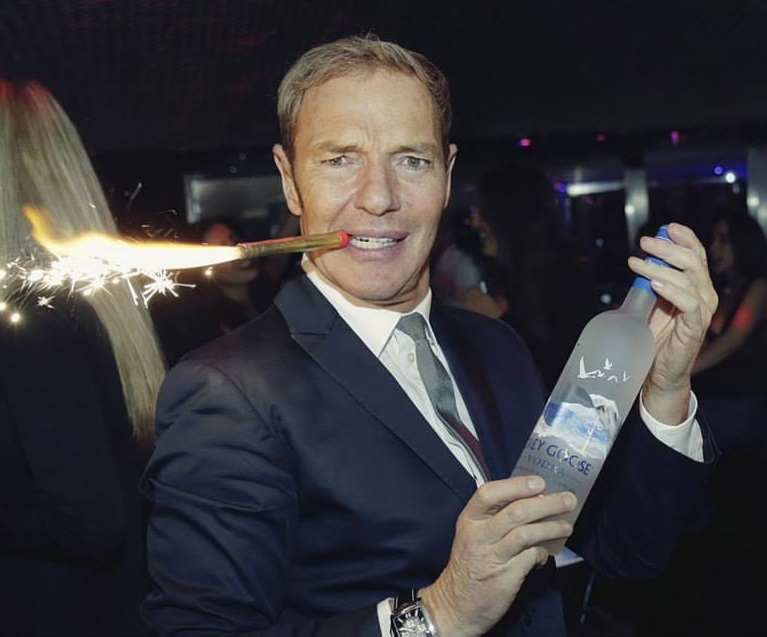
French businessman Tony Gomez

Around midnight on April 28 in 1998 Grégory, who was living with Tony Gomez, was shot in the arm with a rifle when returning home. The victim escaped and went to alert the emergency services in the bar. The shooter was apprehended after bar patrons blocked the exit of the residence. Philippe denied any knowledge of the shooter, but investigation revealed that they had spoken six times on the phone that night. The shooter, a truck driver, claimed to have acted on orders but refused to name his employer. At the time of the incident, Philippe was the financial director of the Banana Café.

Gomez was questioned and believed Philippe organised the attack. He had seen Xavier Philippe stealing from the café's cash register and had discovered the existence of a life insurance policy taken out in his name for the benefit of Philippe's mother. When the case was revisited, Gomez stated:

"I truly realize how lucky I was to have escaped Xavier Philippe's clutches when I avoided the death he had planned for me. His strength is (...) to always position himself as a victim. He is intelligent and completely amoral."

Gomez was Bertrand Philippe's partner for over twenty years. When Bertrand Philippe committed suicide on 5 July 1995, his brother was convinced that Tony Gomez was to blame for his death. He allegedly ordered his assault in 1998.

Philippe was charged in May 2006 with the attempted murder of Tony Gomez. At his residence, police had seized a pistol as well as swords and daggers, but these were not connected to the crime.

=== Murder of Christophe Belle ===
On 17 May 2005, a man was found dead in the woods near the town of Sucy-en-Brie. The national police observed three bullet wounds in the head. The Paris criminal police took charge of the investigation. At the crime scene, investigators found a bag of white powder near the victim, which was suspected to be cocaine. The initial evidence at the scene suggested a drug-related settling of scores. The deceased's identity papers were found in his jacket and he was identified as Christophe Belle, a well-known Parisian pastry chef.

Upon investigation of Belle's family and lifestyle, investigators ruled out the possibility of a drug deal gone wrong. Although cocaine was found at the scene, toxicology reports had shown no drug use. Belle was considered to be a meticulous and punctual individual, arousing suspicion when he did not arrive to open the bakery. Police suspected that Belle's murder was staged, and so investigators interviewed his relatives and bakery staff. It was commonly mentioned that Belle had been subjected to numerous incidents recently: threatening phone calls and minor damage to the bakery. And they all accuse Christophe's rival, a certain M.F., who has been in a commercial dispute with him for several years. The police discover he lives in the town where the body was found, close to the woods. He is arrested but claims to have an alibi: he has not lived in the town for nearly four years (failure to change his address) and on the evening of the crime, he was in Normandy.

On 24 May, a judicial investigation was opened for murder. The police officers from the criminal investigation department suspected manipulation and a staged crime scene. Philippe, Belle's boss, had received a voicemail from the victim saying, 'I'll be there in 5 or 10 minutes'. A friend stated that it was rare for Belle to call Philippe and it was suspected that Philippe had lured the victim to him in the early hours. Philippe claimed it was a mistake on Christophe Belle's part. The police analysed the victim's phone and observed that there could be no mistake.

A month later, Belle's wife alerted the police: she had discovered a life insurance policy taken out by her husband, with Xavier Philippe as the beneficiary. Philippe would have received over €40,000 from the life insurance policy as well as over €300,000 from selling the shop after the death of Belle. According to the bakery staff, Philippe was known for 'dipping into the till'. Belle had noticed a discrepancy between receipts and purchases of goods as well as the embezzlement of tens of thousands. The investigation into Xavier Philippe reveals his criminal record, his unstable profile, many suspicions of insurance fraud, and the 1998 assassination attempt against Gomez. As the case was still under investigation at the time and the police observed many similarities, they issued a report on 28 November.

On 29 November, Xavier Philippe was arrested for the murder of Belle. He continued to deny responsibility for the crime, despite evidence against him. Philippe was charged with murder and placed in pre-trial detention.

=== Other deaths linked to Xavier Philippe ===
On 7 December 2005, his ex-wife was interviewed. She stated that, on the night of 17 to 18 November 1988, he came home later than usual. He allegedly confessed to her that he had killed Pascal Le Roy in order to avoid prison. Pascal Le Roy was a former business partner who had been missing since then. He warned her not to go to the police and even threatened her. This added a new element to the case before Xavier Philippe's trial.

When checking Philippe's criminal record, investigators discovered a conviction for manslaughter. On 27 June 1991, while riding a motorcycle and running a red light, Philippe struck and killed 86-year-old Joseph Terzian in Paris. Initially charged with murder, Philippe was ultimately convicted of manslaughter and briefly imprisoned before being released.

A third death is suspected of being linked to Philippe. When his brother Bertrand was found dead on 5 July 1995, the investigation concluded that it was suicide. Philippe has always maintained that his brother's suicide was Gomez's fault. This case allegedly motivated the attempted murder of Gomez in 1998. For his part, Gomez has always maintained that Philippe killed his brother and then made it look like suicide.

=== Trial for Belle's murder. ===
On 23 June 2008, Philippe's trial began at the Val-de-Marne Assize Court. The court examined the case and the defendant's background for two long weeks. During the trial, Gomez, his former business partner and nightclub owner, was questioned. He said of the defendant: 'He never had any rules, he dares to do anything because he doesn't know the difference between what is allowed and what is not.' He made no secret of his negative opinion of him; he was convinced of his former business partner's guilt in the 1998 assault case. Gomez is convinced that he was the target. He filed a complaint against Philippe.

During his closing argument, Philippe Sarda, Philippe's lawyer, stated: "We will focus on the many inconsistencies in this case and try to prove that it was a set-up that ultimately benefited Tony Gomez." On 5 July, Philippe was sentenced to 30 years' imprisonment.

Philippe's lawyer lodged an appeal, but the 30-year sentence was upheld on appeal on 17 June 2010. Philippe appealed to the Court of cassation, but the Court rejected his appeal. He then requested a priority constitutionality review, but this was also rejected, confirming his 30-year prison sentence.

=== Trial for the attempted murder of Grégory C. and Tony Gomez ===
A suspicious letter disrupted the trial. According to investigators, this unsigned letter was sent by Philippe to be a witness in the murder of Belle. The letter read: "You correct your statement. Alain Samycia does not know Xavier, that's all." Alain Samycia was one suspect in the attempted murder of Grégory and Gomez in 1998; more specifically, the man Philippe allegedly paid to kill Gomez.

On 23 June 2011, Philippe and his lawyer referred a Priority Preliminary Constitutionality Question (QPC) to the 10th Chamber of the Paris Criminal Court based on Article 6 of the ECHR: 'Everyone is entitled to a fair and public hearing within a reasonable time.' His lawyer emphasised that the charges against his client, Philippe, dated back to 28 April 1998. He also denounced 'the extraordinary length of time taken to deal with a case that is not so complex' and attempted to make the jury aware of the suffering of the relatives of Belle, the victim. The prosecutor retorts that the convicted man is a 'Machiavellian', "calculating" individual, 'a man with no limits, no moral sense', 'of endless greed and appetite'.

On 4 July 2012, Philippe was sentenced to an additional four years in prison for organising the attempted murder of Grégory and Gomez. On 12 June 2013, the Paris Court of Appeal acquitted Philippe of aggravated assault against Grégory in the Tony Gomez case.

=== Release ===
Philippe was released in February 2025, after 19 years in prison.

== See also ==
- List of serial killers by country
- Mark Dutroux
