= Maurice Gateaux =

French serial killer and prisoner (1936–2019)

- Born: Maurice Gateaux; 2 August 1936; Longchamps, Aisne, France
- Died: 17 May 2019 (aged 82); Soissons, France
- Other name: "The King Kong"
- Status: Deceased
- Conviction: Murder x3
- Penalty: 20 years' imprisonnement (1966); Life imprisonment (1968) (released in 2016)

Details
- Victims: 3
- Span of crimes: 1956–1967
- Country: France
- Date apprehended: 1956 (first time); 5 April 1965 (final time)

Maurice Gateaux (2 August 1936 – 17 May 2019) was a French serial killer, multi-recidivist killer and prisoner who spent 51 years in prison without benefit of a reduced sentence.

In 1956, Gateaux killed an Algerian prisoner without being prosecuted, because he was intellectually disabled and the events took place during the Algerian War. In 1965, he committed a robbery by fatally beating a police officer. Placed in detention at the age of 28 in April 1965, he was sentenced in 1966 to 20 years' imprisonment before being transferred to the Nîmes Central Prison due to his diagnosed dangerousness. Incarcerated at Nîmes Prison, Gateaux killed a prison guard in May 1967 and attempted to kill another guard with a pair of scissors he was using in the sewing workshop. Tried in February 1968, he was granted mitigating circumstances on account of his intellectual disability, and was sentenced to life imprisonment.

Released in July 2016 at the age of almost 80, Gateaux was cared for in a nursing home in Soissons, where he died on 17 May 2019. Between 6 April 1965 and July 2016, Gateaux remained in prison, without being granted a modified sentence, making his case the longest uninterrupted detention in France.

== Biography ==
=== Youth ===
Maurice Gateaux was born on 2 August 1936 in Longchamps, Aisne. He was the sixth child of a first marriage, whose mother subsequently gave birth to ten other children. Gateaux had a difficult birth, almost suffocating, which delayed his physical growth.

From 1942 to 1950, he was educated at the local school, where he was finally expelled at the age of 14. Gateaux left the local school in 1950 with poor reading and writing skills. He also began to drink alcohol, which led him to undergo several detoxification threatments.

A farm labourer and then a labourer, Gateaux was drafted into the airborne troops in French Algeria in 1956. He was 20 years old at the time.

=== The first deaths ===
Gateaux was arrested in 1956 and remanded in custody for beating an Algerian prisoner to death. He was eventually discharged for ‘profound debility’, as his mental state did not allow him to be prosecuted or kept in detention. Gateaux was therefore released from prison and returned to France without prosecution or follow-up. In 1959 and 1960, Gateaux was imprisoned for theft and assault. He was later released after serving his sentences.

In April 1965, Gateaux committed a robbery during which he violently beat a police officer, before driving off with the stolen goods. The police officer was seriously injured and died as a result of the blows sustained by Gateaux. Following this robbery, which was considered particularly violent, some people in the vicinity recognised Gateaux, particularly because of his characteristic mental state. He was arrested on 6 April 1965 and remanded in custody, charged with robbery followed by fatal blows.

In May 1966, Gateaux appeared before the Assize Court, charged with fatal blows and robbery. He was granted extenuating circumstances because he had been diagnosed as intellectually disabled, which impaired his discernment and reduced his responsibility. At the end of his trial, Gateaux was sentenced to 20 years' imprisonment. In August, while serving his prison sentence, Gateaux was transferred to the Nîmes central prison, described by President Panet (who would later judge him) as being intended for ‘particularly fearsome convicts who require severe discipline.

=== Murder of Marius Albe and violence against Bereyziat ===
At around 1.30pm on 16 May 1967, while in Nîmes prison, Gateaux emerged from the sewing room with a pair of scissors and fatally stabbed guard Marius Albe, then injured his colleague Bereyziat. Gateaux was eventually overpowered and charged with the murder of Marius Albe and the attempted murder of guard Bereyziat. In prison, following this particularly violent murder, Gateaux was nicknamed ‘King Kong’ by his fellow inmates, due to his so-called Herculean strength, which could go as far as murder.

Gateaux appeared before the Nîmes Assize Court on 31 January 1968. He was 31 years old at the time. At the start of his trial, Gateaux fiercely denied the murder of Marius Albe, which had only been witnessed by prisoners, and declared that the prisoners who had witnessed the crime were liars. Gateaux nevertheless confessed to the attempted murder of Mr Bereyziat, but said he had had no intention of killing him. When President Panet confronted him with the facts, Gateaux simply said they were false and called them ‘liars’.

During the three-day trial, President Panet spoke of Gateaux's case, stating:

"Gâteaux is judged to be a dangerous man. The two experts who took the stand on Wednesday agreed on this point. They even described him as unacceptable. In their view, Gâteaux has a psychopathic personality whose ‘character disorders mitigate against criminal responsibility’.

- President Panet

Gateaux, who faces the death penalty, also refuted President Panet's statements, denying that any violence was involved in the crime: "I don't know what happened. I didn't screw him up". On 2 February, Gateaux was sentenced to life imprisonment for murder and attempted murder, escaping the death penalty and benefiting from extenuating circumstances, again because of his mental retardation.

=== The longest continuous detention in France ===
On the night of 20 to 21 July 1974, the sewing room at the Maison Centrale in Nîmes, where Marius Albe had died, was set on fire, killing two inmates.

Sentenced to life imprisonment, Maurice Gateaux was eligible for release in May 1982, but refused to be released, arguing that he felt ‘at home’ in prison. During his captivity, he worked out until 2011. For many long years, Gateaux was incarcerated at the Château-Thierry penitentiary (Aisne), where he ‘resigned himself to dying in prison’, as one of his warders told the Courrier picard in 2014, which named him as one of the longest-serving prisoners in France.

Gateaux was quietly released in July 2016, just a few days before his 80th birthday. Paroled after 51 years of uninterrupted detention, Gateaux held the record for the longest prison sentence in France. On his release, Gateaux was admitted to a nursing home in Soissons, where he was cared for. Gateaux died on 17 May 2019 at the Soissons nursing home, aged 82.

== See also ==
- List of French serial killers
