= Annuitant =

Person entitled to receive benefits from an annuity

An annuitant is a person who is entitled to receive benefits from an annuity. The payout benefits for an annuitant are based on the person's life expectancy.

Since 2000, in the United States of America, Federal and State agencies have allowed the rehiring of retired employees without the loss of their retirement benefits. Such a "rehire" is referred to as an annuitant. Often a maximum number of hours per year which the annuitant may work is specified. In 2020/2021, these annuitants were providing emergency pandemic support.

For instance, the State of California has posted annuitant guidelines.

The rehiring of retired employees often allows agencies to benefit from the experience of retired employees who may be relied upon to share their experience and training with new hires, or to supplement or "bridge" areas where person power is needed but not currently affordable.
