= Lucien Léger =

French criminal (1937–2008)

Lucien Léger, (30 March 1937 – 6 July 2008) was a French criminal, sentenced to life imprisonment for the murder of a child in 1964. He was the oldest detainee in France before his release, and was nicknamed the Strangler by the press because of the signature "Strangler No. 1" affixed to the bottom of anonymous letters sent to the police.

== Biography ==
=== Childhood ===
Eugène Lucien Léger was born on 30 March 1937, in the 14th arrondissement of Paris, into a modest family of seven children, originally from Château-Regnault in the Ardennes department. His father was a metal turner at Renault. Incorporated into the Camp de Mourmelon, he performed his military service in French Algeria. In 1959, he married Solange in Charleville-Mézières, sister of a friend of the regiment. Léger first worked as a storekeeper at Éditions Denoël. His wife was interned several times. Léger became a nursing student at the Villejuif psychiatric hospital.

=== Crime ===
On 26 May 1964, late in the afternoon, Luc Taron, born 9 May 1953, disappeared after being scolded by his mother Suzanne Taron for having stolen 15 francs from her. His parents initially believed that he ran away and did not immediately notify the police. On 27 May, around 5 a.m., Jules Beudard, while walking in the woods of Verrières-le-Buisson, in Essonne, before going to the factory, discovered the body of the child, mutilated and strangled, at a place called "Le Salvart". The same evening of the discovery, at 11:50 pm, the murderer telephoned Europe 1 and indicates where to find a message on the windshield of a car. The handwritten text describing the crime, and which announces other kidnappings if an advance ransom is not paid to him, is signed The strangler no 1. The press reported only the nickname "strangler", omitting the no 1 which apparently annoyed the murderer: in the following month, fifty-five anonymous letters were sent to the press, the police, the victim's father and the Minister of the Interior, claiming to be the perpetrator of the crime as well as announcing others, and asking for "50 million" francs.

On 27 June 1964, Lucien Léger reported the theft of his 2CV to the Invalides police station. Four days later, he returned to the police station and claimed to have found his vehicle in a parking lot following a phone call from the Strangler. He also reported that the interior of the car was soaked with stains of human blood. On 2 July, the fifty-sixth letter signed by the Strangler arrives at the police station. The criminal wrote there that he used the 2CV to abduct a mobster from Pigalle and kill him. Summoned for interrogation on 4 July, Lucien Léger was the main suspect, especially as the search of his hotel room uncovered that he kept newspapers relating to the case and a draft novel entitled Diary of an Assassin. His writing confused the police and he was arrested and imprisoned the next day. Lucien Léger confessed but subsequently retracted to the crime during a reconstitution in June 1965.

== Release and death ==
Léger was the oldest detainee in France before being released on 3 October 2005, after 41 years of imprisonment, which constitutes one of the longest detentions in Europe (it does not, however, equal that of serial killer John Straffen who was detained for 55 years in the United Kingdom). He died in Laon in July 2008.
