= David Lefèvre (serial killer) =

Convicted French serial killer

- Born: 17 May 1980 (age 46); Reims, France
- Other name: "The Swamp Killer"
- Convictions: First degree murder x1 Second degree murder x1 Manslaughter x1 Drug trafficking Car theft
- Penalty: 5 years (first murder); Life imprisonment x2 (later murders)

Details
- Victims: 3
- Span of crimes: 1999; January – September 2011
- Country: France
- State: Picardie
- Date apprehended: 14 December 2011

David Patrick Roger Lefèvre (born 17 May 1980), known as The Swamp Killer (French: Le Tueur des Marais), is a French serial killer.

On 5 August 1999, Lefèvre committed an armed robbery with an accomplice. Three days later, he killed a homeless man during a second robbery. Sentenced to five years' imprisonment, he was released in November 2002. In 2003, Lefèvre was re-incarcerated for car theft and violation of the terms of his release. Released in 2004, Lefèvre was re-incarcerated again in 2005 for drug trafficking and vehicle theft. Sentenced to five years in prison, he was released in 2008.

In January and September 2011, Lefèvre killed two of his friends near the Avre marshes towpaths. After an initial investigation into an accident, the case turned into a criminal investigation following the discovery of the second victim's body. Arrested on 14 December, Lefèvre was charged with first-degree murder and second-degree murder and placed in pre-trial detention. On 15 November 2013, he was sentenced to life imprisonment with a minimum term of 22 years.

== Biography ==
=== Early life ===
David Lefèvre was born on 17 May 1980 in Reims (Marche). He was one of six children and grew up in a dysfunctional family environment, with unloving and incestuous parents who subjected him to physical and sexual abuse; he later described them as “social cases”.

In 1988, at the age of 8, Lefèvre was placed in foster care near Laon with his brothers and sisters after their father was arrested for gang rape. Lefèvre was a reserved child and evasive on certain subjects, particularly when his parents and his early years with them were mentioned.

Lefèvre's childhood was marked by absenteeism. Although he never saw his parents again, Lefèvre developed a persecuted and unhealthy personality, without noticing any difference from reality. In contrast, Lefèvre built a swing for his brothers and sisters to bring comfort to siblings who were also marked by neglect — one of his sisters would later testify to this. As a teenager, Lefèvre turned to crime. He and his accomplice bought a pellet gun with the intention of committing armed robberies.

=== Armed robberies and first death ===
On 5 August 1999, Lefèvre, aged 19, and his accomplice, a minor, committed their first armed robbery in Laon. The robbery was successful and a small amount of money was stolen. By the time the police arrived on the scene, the two robbers had already left. No clues were found at the scene. Following their crime, Lefèvre and his accomplice planned to commit a long series of armed attacks, which could earn them more money.

On 8 August, Lefèvre and his accomplice attacked a homeless man and robbed him. Seeking to impress the victim, Lefèvre shot the homeless man in the head with his pistol. Overcome with emotion, he also shot his victim's rat and then crushed it with his foot. The two murderers then decided to steal the victim's minimum income allowance as loot before fleeing. Several passers-by near the scene of the crime were alerted by the sound of the gunshot and decided to go to the scene. They alerted the emergency services, but attempts to resuscitate the homeless man were unsuccessful. An investigation into armed robbery followed by death is opened. Investigators establish a link with the first robbery. Witnesses quickly came forward with information about the death of the homeless man. Witnesses at the scene claim to have seen two young men fleeing after the shots were fired. They estimate their age to be around 20. Another person claims to have recognised one of the perpetrators during the robbery that went wrong. With this testimony, the police are able to track down Lefèvre and his accomplice.

On 12 August, Lefèvre and his accomplice were arrested and taken into custody. A search was carried out at the suspects' respective homes, leading to the discovery of a pellet gun. Ballistic tests confirmed that this was the weapon used to kill the homeless man. Lefèvre and his accomplice admitted to the crimes and claimed that they had committed the robberies to get as much money as possible. However, they denied any intention to kill the homeless man, but admitted that they had intended to commit further robberies if they had not been arrested. The police quickly realised that their suspects were two young men who had lost their way in life. Lefèvre and his accomplice were charged on 14 August with armed robbery and armed robbery resulting in death, then placed in pre-trial detention at Laon Penitentiary.

At this stage of the investigation, police are attempting to determine whether the murder of the homeless man was intentional or even premeditated. An initial investigation concluded that it was intentional but not premeditated, as Lefèvre and his accomplice were unaware of the homeless man's presence before the crime was committed. However, Lefèvre and his accomplice's lawyers refute their clients' intent to kill and are requesting that the charges be reclassified as robbery with violence [for both robberies] and manslaughter [for the second robbery], so that they can be tried in a criminal court. They also point out that a pellet gun is not lethal and does not constitute intent to kill. The investigation partially complied with this request, reclassifying the offences as armed robbery [for the first robbery] and "robbery with violence resulting in manslaughter" [for the second]. For these offences, Lefèvre and his accomplice were referred to the Douai Juvenile Court, as the accomplice was a minor at the time of the offences.

=== Trial for robbery and death assault ===
On 2 May 2002, the trial of Lefèvre and his accomplice began before the Douai Juvenile Court for armed robbery [for the first robbery] and robbery with violence resulting in manslaughter.

Now 22 years old, Lefèvre kept a low profile and kept his head down. However, he admitted to the facts, without confessing to any valid motive for the death of the homeless man: according to him, the victim was ‘in the wrong place at the wrong time.’ In response to this argument, the Court reminded him that he faced up to 20 years in prison at the end of his trial. On the stand, Lefèvre's sisters, Sylvie and Nathalie, testify about their childhood marked by violent, alcoholic and incestuous parents, as well as a father convicted of complicity in gang rape. Psychiatrists also confirm that his personality was shaped by a childhood marked by neglect. They point to a downward spiral consistent with the unhealthy environment in which he grew up, but curable. These testimonies made an impression on the court, which decided to grant Lefèvre mitigating circumstances.

On 3 May, Lefèvre was sentenced to five years' imprisonment, six months of which were suspended, with a three-year probation period.

=== Release and further imprisonment ===
Lefèvre was released on 8 November 2002, after serving three years and three months in prison. Following his release, he returned to live with his foster family and was reunited with his brothers and sisters.

In 2003, while still on probation, Lefèvre was arrested after stealing a car. He was charged with vehicle theft and violating the terms of his release—his probation—and then placed in pre-trial detention. Lefèvre appeared before the Douai Criminal Court on 21 August for these offences and was sentenced to one year in prison. With his six-month suspended sentence added to his sentence, his conviction was increased to 18 months in prison.

When he was released from prison in 2004, Lefèvre decided to move out on his own. With no qualifications, he took on a few temporary jobs, but soon found himself short of money. He then decided to sell cannabis resin. Lefèvre did not use drugs himself and developed a hatred for this world, which he felt he had been forced into. He strongly disliked drug addicts, considering them to be "parasites" and "good-for-nothings".

In 2005, Lefèvre was arrested again by the police for illegal possession of cocaine during a roadside check. In addition to his illegal possession, the police noticed that the vehicle had been stolen. Lefèvre was charged with drug trafficking and repeat vehicle theft, then placed in pre-trial detention. In 2006, he appeared before the Péronne Criminal Court for his offences — repeat vehicle theft and drug trafficking — and was sentenced to five years' imprisonment.

=== Release and murders in the Avre marshes ===
Lefèvre was released in 2008 after three years in prison. He then moved to Amiens, where no one knew about his criminal record. He worked as a temporary warehouse worker and helped his neighbours when they needed it. Only a rehabilitation worker noticed his domineering and narcissistic personality.

On the night of 13 to 14 January 2011, Lefèvre travelled to Belgium. He was supposed to take Julien Guérin, a 22-year-old friend, back to his home in Amiens. Guérin had consumed a large amount of vodka and was severely intoxicated. Lefèvre drove him to the Camon marshes and struck him on the head with a crowbar. Guérin fell into the Avre River and drowned. Lefèvre left the scene to return home and dispose of the crowbar. The next day, Guérin's family became concerned when they had not heard from him. The police were contacted but did not take the disappearance seriously. Lefèvre helped search for him, but the search was unsuccessful. In the evening, Lefèvre went to Alice's house, Guérin's partner, touched her left breast and offered to tell her what had happened in exchange for sex. Alice refuses and files a complaint against him for sexual assault the next day. Taken into custody, Lefèvre says he had an argument with Guérin and dropped him off in Amiens. He claims to have come to see Alice with the intention of seducing her, but also to provoke Guérin. He says he was convinced that Guérin would return. With no charges against Lefèvre, he was released. On 21 January, Alice decided to contact the press, who took her disappearance seriously. Guérin's body was found in the Avre River on 14 February by a lock keeper carrying out an inspection. An investigation was then opened with a view to conducting an autopsy to determine the cause of death. It was concluded that the death was accidental, after the young man had drunk a large amount of vodka. As for the fracture to his skull, the forensic scientist suggested that it was caused by a boat propeller during the drowning.

On the night of 4 to 5 September, in Amiens, Alexandre Michaud, 24, violently struck the wall following an argument with his partner and injured his wrist. Having no means of transport, Nelly called Lefèvre. He took Michaud in his car to the hospital. When they left the hospital, Lefèvre took Michaud to the Camon marshes and killed him with two gunshots. He then dragged Michaud's body into the marshes, where it became entangled in a boat mooring chain. Lefèvre fled the scene and returned home. Nelly went to the police station on 6 September to report Michaud's disappearance. She recounted their argument the day before and said that he had disappeared after Lefèvre took him to hospital. The next day, the missing man's mother alerted the police. On 10 September, Michaud's body was discovered in the Camon marshes, his feet caught in a mooring rope. An investigation was then opened for murder. The police did not immediately make the connection with Guérin's death because the two victims were not found in the same place. They first took Nelly's former partner into custody because he had threatened to kill Michaud during his short stay in the Somme. He confirmed his death threats against Michaud, but claimed to have reconciled with his rival when he dropped his children off at his house a few hours before the tragedy. The suspect is therefore released. The police turn their attention to Lefèvre, who was the last person to see Michaud alive. They are surprised to discover that Lefèvre has already been questioned about Guérin's death and that he has previously killed a homeless person. When they reopen the Guérin case, the investigators discover that Lefèvre was the last person to have been with the two young men before their deaths.

Lefèvre is taken into custody on 14 September for the murder of Michaud. During his hearing, the suspect resists the police officers who are questioning him. Lefèvre gives his version of events, but the police extend his custody after discovering his criminal record. After extensive questioning, Lefèvre leaves the police station a free man because there is insufficient evidence to incriminate him. The investigators decided to place him on wiretapping his phone and gather more evidence. A new autopsy was performed on Guérin's body. The medical examiner, who was responsible for examining the photos of the body, immediately rejected the accident hypothesis: the wounds on the head were consistent with an ante-mortem rather than a post-mortem injury. In his report, issued on 2 November, he mentions an impact caused by a blunt object, probably wielded by a third party. This is therefore a case of voluntary homicide, with Lefèvre becoming the prime suspect.

On 8 November, a telephone call between Lefèvre and Nelly caught the attention of the police: while Nelly seemed to be getting on his nerves, Lefèvre told her not to provoke him, saying that he had [already] killed three people and that he would have no qualms about doing it again. As this was said in a joking tone, Nelly did not take Lefèvre's statements seriously. Investigators also discovered that Lefèvre had purchased a gun holster on 12 February 2011. As for the blood found in his car, Lefèvre was unaware that it was unusable and mentioned it on the phone. He claimed that Michaud was bleeding when he arrived at the hospital, which the hospital denied when staff were questioned. Lefèvre's behaviour therefore became suspicious.

=== Arrest and imprisonment for the Marsh Murders ===
On 14 December 2011, Lefèvre was once again taken into custody. After lengthy questioning, Lefèvre denied the allegations and decided to stop answering the police officers' questions. Confronted with his inconsistencies regarding Michaud's death, he finally admitted to being responsible for his death, but claimed that he had killed him accidentally. According to him, Lefèvre took the victim to the scene to give him a weapon. Michaud then allegedly snatched it from his hands and fired it. Lefèvre said he killed Michaud so that he would no longer suffer. When questioned about his choice of location, Lefèvre made a mistake: he said he chose this place because it was where Guérin's body had been found. Following his confession, Lefèvre was taken to the Camon marshes to answer for the murder of Alexandre Michaud. Unaware that Julien's body had drifted away with the marsh current, Lefèvre noticed that Guérin had been discovered further away, thus unwittingly confessing his involvement in the first case. Because of this "accidental confession", Lefèvre was charged on 15 December with the murder of Michaud and the murder of Guérin, as a repeat offender, and then placed in pre-trial detention at Amiens Prison. He was thus nicknamed the "marsh killer" and the "swamp killer".

On 20 March 2012, Lefèvre wrote a letter to the prosecutor from his prison cell in which he admitted to killing Guerin and Michaud. He claimed to have struck Guerin in a fit of rage after Guerin refused to return his baseball bat. However, he denied any intention to kill Guerin, claiming he did not know that Guerin was drowning. Regarding the murder of Michaud, Lefèvre claimed that his fate was sealed from the moment he got into the car. He claimed that he could not stand the victim mocking him, to the point of committing the irreparable. At the end of the letter, Lefèvre expressed his apologies and remorse to the families of his victims. No one is convinced by his confession, given the trivial motive Lefèvre gives.

On 25 September, a reconstruction of the events took place at the Avre River, the scene of the murders. Lefèvre was taken from Amiens prison to corroborate his statements. The prosecution had to decide whether Guérin had really died accidentally. The victims' families were also present. When she saw Lefèvre, Michaud's mother was stunned to see such an ordinary-looking murderer. When the murder of Guérin is re-enacted, the frogman [tasked with mimicking the victim] struggles to reach the surface and has to be helped by the emergency services. Lefèvre could not have been unaware that Guérin was going to drown. The actions relating to Michaud's murder are consistent with Lefèvre's statements. At the end of the reconstruction, Lefèvre was returned to Amiens prison, without having changed his story about the motive for his crimes.

In early 2013, Lefèvre was sent to the Assize Court of the Somme for the first-degree murder of Alexandre Michaud and the second-degree murder of Julien Guérin, committed as a repeat offence. Premeditation was not considered for the murder of Guérin because Lefèvre did not possess a lethal weapon at the time of the crime.

=== Trial for the Marsh Murders ===
On 12 November 2013, Lefèvre's trial began before the Assize Court of the Somme.

The 33-year-old defendant keeps a low profile and lowers his head, announcing his wish to remain silent. He remains motionless and silent, admitting that he would accept his sentence and that he does not deserve any support from his friends and family. Called to the stand, Lefèvre's friends paint a very positive picture of the accused. As in his first trial in 2002, Sylvie and Nathalie Lefèvre testify about their difficult childhood: violent, alcoholic parents, a mother who blamed each of her children for being born, and a father convicted of complicity in gang rape. One of them went even further, reporting that her only good memory was thanks to Lefèvre: he had built a swing for her brothers and sisters when they were young. As for Guérin's younger brother, he painted an inhuman portrait of Lefèvre and stated his desire to kill her if she ever got out of prison.

One of the lawyers for the civil parties paints a picture of a serial killer, emphasising that he appears to kill without motive. Most of the key figures in the case describe him as narcissistic and capable of exerting a toxic influence over others. They also claim that Lefèvre would have continued killing if he had not been arrested. It is also mentioned that Lefèvre refused to see psychiatrists while in pre-trial detention. These three elements do not work in the defendant's favour and do not inspire any leniency. The Court is therefore convinced that Guérin's murder was motivated by Lefèvre's hatred of drug addicts. It is also convinced that Michaud's murder was motivated by Lefèvre's narcissistic personality; considering himself superior to Michaud, Lefèvre could not accept that Nelly chose him as her partner instead.

On 15 November, Lefèvre was found guilty of the first-degree murder of Michaud and the second-degree murder of Guérin, as a repeat offender. He was sentenced to life imprisonment with a minimum term of 22 years.

== See also ==
- List of French serial killers
