= Volpajola =

Volpajola A Vulpaiola
- Commune
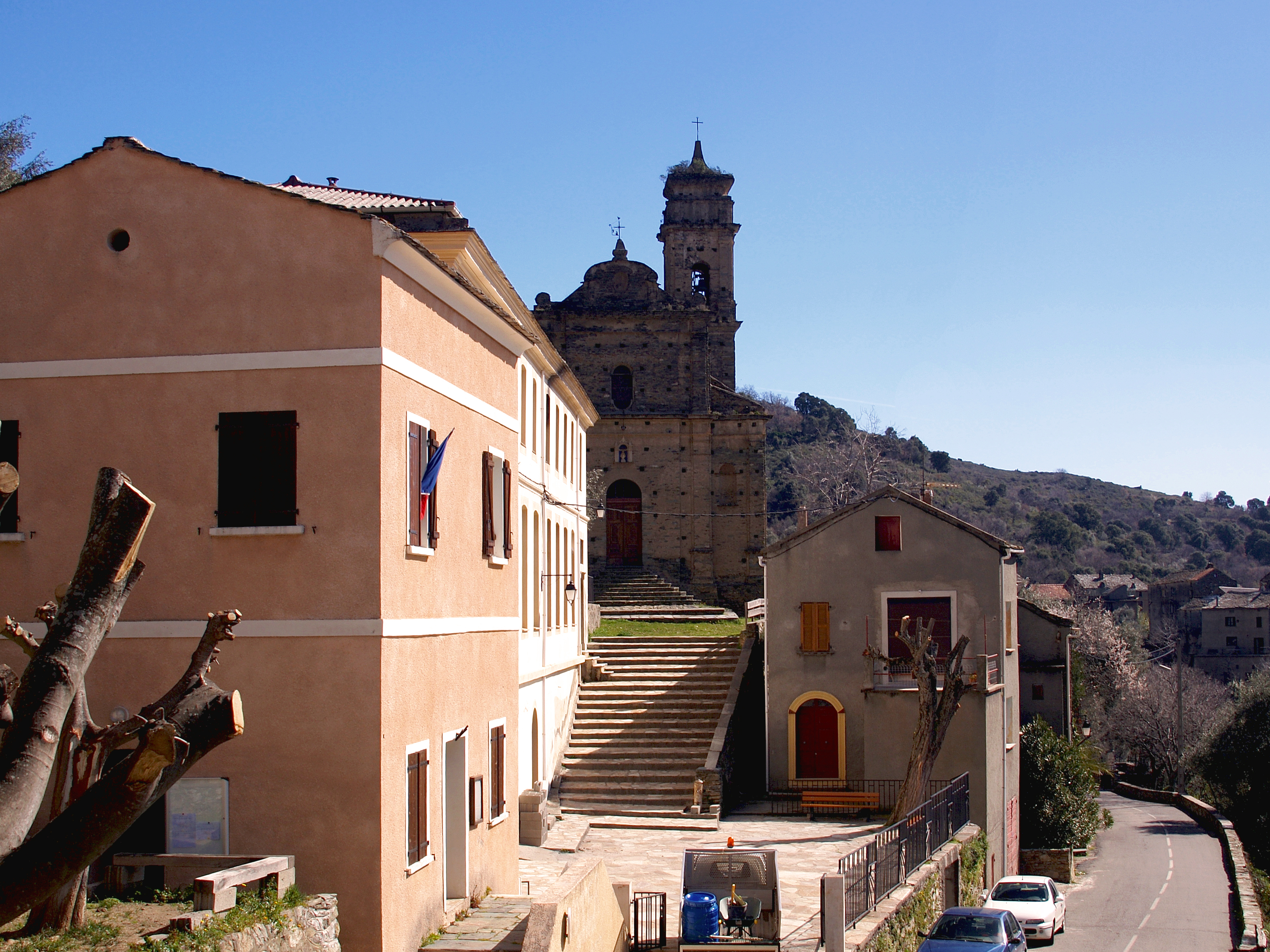
- Town hall and church

- Coat of arms
- Location of Volpajola
- Location within France Location within Corsica
- Coordinates: 42°31′35″N 9°21′29″E
- Country: France
- Region: Corsica
- Department: Haute-Corse
- Arrondissement: Corte
- Canton: Golo-Morosaglia
- Intercommunality: Castagniccia-Casinca

Government
  - Mayor (2020–2026): André Agostini
- Area^{1}: 13 km^{2} (5.0 sq mi)
- Elevation: 400 m (1,300 ft)
- Highest elevation: 1,231 m (4,039 ft)
- Lowest elevation: 45 m (148 ft)
- Population (2023): 418
  - Density: 32/km^{2} (83/sq mi)
- Time zone: UTC+01:00 (CET)
  - Summer (DST): UTC+02:00 (CEST)
- INSEE/Postal code: 2B355 /20290
- ^{1} French Land Register data, which excludes lakes, ponds, glaciers > 1 km^{2} (0.386 sq mi or 247 acres) and river estuaries.

Volpajola is a commune in the Haute-Corse department of France on the island of Corsica.

It is part of the canton of Golo-Morosaglia.

== Geography ==
Volpajola is 6 kilometres (4 mi) to the east of Campitello. Its territory stretches over the left bank of the River Golo, through which runs Route N193 towards Bastia.

== Population ==
Historical population
Year	Pop.	±% p.a.
1968	492	—
1975	460	−0.96%
1982	281	−6.80%
1990	275	−0.27%
1999	366	+3.23%
2007	433	+2.12%
2012	453	+0.91%
2017	390	−2.95%
2023	418	+1.16%
Source: INSEE

== See also ==
- Communes of the Haute-Corse department
