= List of major crimes in France (1900–1999) =

This page presents, in a non-exhaustive manner, notorious or significant French criminal cases whose developments that took place in the 20th century. Types of crime include murders, rape, theft, kidnappings, sex crimes, assassinations, poisonings, drug crimes, war crimes, missing person cases, terrorism, high-profile criminal trials and miscellaneous organised crime.

== 1901–1910 ==
Year	Department	Case	Summary	Convictions and comments
1905–1908	Drôme	Chauffeurs de la Drôme	From 1905 to 1908 in the Drôme, acts of banditry followed by assassinations by Urbain Liottard, Octave David and Louis Berruyer.	Urbain Liottard was sentenced to death on 10 July 1909, Octave David to death, and Louis Berruyer to death by the Drôme Assize Court. They were guillotined on 22 September 1909 in Valence.
1907	Seine	Albert Soleilland	On 31 January 1907 in Paris, eleven-year-old Marthe Erbelding was murdered after being raped and stabbed.	Albert Soleilland was sentenced to death on 23 July 1907. He was pardoned and died in prison in 1920 after 13 years of detention.
1907	Gironde	Crime de Langon	On 6 February 1907 in Langon, heinous murder of an insurance agent, Jean-Théodore Monget, strangled with a towel, committed by Jean-Eugène Branchery and Henri Parrot.	Jean-Eugène Branchery was sentenced to death on 29 February 1908, and Henri Parrot to death by the Assize Court of Gironde. They were pardoned on 18 July 1908.
1909	Seine-et-Oise	Marie Bourette	On 22 October 1909 in Le Vésinet, the Belgian tenor Jules Godart was poisoned by Marie Bourette	Marie Bourette was sentenced on 13 July 1910 to forced labor for life by the Seine-et-Oise Assize Court.
1910	Seine	Jean-Jacques Liabeuf	On 8 January 1910 in Paris, a police officer was murdered by anarchist Jean-Jacques Liabeuf.	Jean-Jacques Liabeuf was sentenced to death on 4 May 1910 by the Assizes of the Seine. Executed by beheading on 1 July 1910 in Paris.
1910	Seine-Inférieure	Jules Durand	On 8 September 1910 in Le Havre, Louis Dongé was killed during a fight during a strike.	Jules Durand was sentenced to death on 25 November 1910, by the Seine-Inférieure Assize Court. He was pardoned and released on 15 February 1911, after one year of detention.

== 1911-1922 ==
Year	Department	Case	Summary	Convictions and comments
1911–1912	Paris, Val-de-Marne, Val-d'Oise, Oise	The Bonnot Gang of Jules Bonnot	Series of robberies and murders.	The gang's misdeeds notably inspired a film released in 1968.
1913	Loire-Inférieure	Marcel Redureau affair	Murder of seven people on 30 September 1913, in the village of Bas-Briacé, commune of Le Landreau. A fifteen-year-old adolescent, Marcel Redureau, admitted to being the perpetrator of the acts.	The affair particularly interested Gide, who published a collection of documents on the subject in 1930.
1914	Paris	Henriette Caillaux	Assassination of the director of Le Figaro , Gaston Calmette, on 16 March 1914, by the wife of Joseph Caillaux, irritated by a press campaign directed against her husband, Minister of Finance in the Doumerguegovernment.	The president of the republic gave a statement during the trial. Henriette Caillaux was ultimately acquitted, her crime being considered a crime of passion.
1914	Paris	Assassination of Jean Jaurès	Assassination of socialist leader Jean Jaurès, on 31 July 1914 by Raoul Villain.	Tried five years after the events, Raoul Villain was acquitted on 29 March 1919 by eleven votes out of twelve, while Jaurès' widow was ordered to pay the costs of the trial.
1915–1919	Yvelines	Henri Désiré Landru	Murder of eleven women between February 1915 and January 1919 in Vernouillet and Gambais by Henri Désiré Landru.	The affair inspired a film in 1947 by Charlie Chaplin, and more explicitly Landru (film, 1963) by Claude Chabrol in 1963.
1916	French Algeria	Murder of Charles de Foucauld	Killing of Charles de Foucauld, a 58-year-old hermit priest on 1 December 1916 in the Algerian Sahara slaughtered by looters.	
1917–1922	Corrèze	Tulle Crow Affair	A wave of anonymous letters signed "The Eye of the Tiger" and denouncing the actions of one and all, caused one death in December 1921 and suicides.	This case had national repercussions. Trapped during a group dictation, Angèle Laval was sentenced. She died on 16 November 1967, at the age of 81. The case inspired Le Corbeau by Henri-Georges Clouzot.
1920–1922	Paris	Bassarabo Affair	Assassination of commissioner Georges Bassarabo on 31 July 1920, whose body was discovered in a trunk sent to Nancy. His wife, born Louise Grouès, writer and feminist activist known under the pen name of Héra Mirtel, defended by Vincent de Moro-Giafferri, is being tried in June 1922 at the Seine Assizes at the same time as her daughter, Paule Jacques. At the end of a trial rich in dramatic twists, Paule Jacques was acquitted, and her mother, benefiting from mitigating circumstances, was sentenced to twenty years of forced labour. She died in Rennes on 21 March 1931.	The crime and the trial made headlines because of the accused's personality and the strangeness of the so-called "bloody trunk" procedure. Several books and television documentaries have echoed this.

== 1923–1930 ==
Year	Department	Case	Summary	Convictions and comments
1922–1929	Hérault	Pierre Laget	Murders by poisoning perpetrated by Pierre Laget on his first wife on 28 May 1922, then on his aunt in 1923, as well as on his second wife on 12 August 1929. He also attempted to kill his sister by poisoning between December 1929 and February 1930.	The affair inspired a book published in 2015: "The Laget affair, an enigma that shook the South of France".
1923	Finistère ?, Région parisienne ?	Seznec affair	The disappearance of Conseiller départemental Pierre Quémeneur during the night of 25 to 26 May 1923, during a trip from Rennes to Paris. Guillaume Seznec, who accompanied him, was sentenced in 1924 to life imprisonment for murder and forgery.	Following the judgment, around ten requests for review were filed and rejected between 1926 and 2006. The case inspired Denis Langlois to write a book, L'Affaire Seznec (Plon, 1988), which received the Human Rights Prize in 1989 and led to a television film adaptation in 1993 by Yves Boisset, with Christophe Malavoy in the role of Guillaume Seznec.
1925	Paris	Ernest Berger	The murder of Ernest Berger, treasurer of the Action Française, on 26 May 1925, in the Saint-Lazare station on the Paris Métro, was shot in the back by the young anarchist activist Maria Bonnefoy, allegedly for her resemblance to Charles Maurras.	She was declared to have total dementia.
1925	Bouches-du-Rhône	Georges-Alexandre Sarret	Murder by a crook lawyer of one of his accomplices and his mistress on 20 August 1925 in the Aix-en-Provence region.	The case inspired the 1974 film The Infernal Trio.
1926	Paris	Affaire Schwartzbard	Assassination of Symon Petliura, Ukrainian socialist and independence leader on 25 May 1926 by revolutionary activist Sholem Schwartzbard.	
1927–1949	Vienne	Affaire Besnard	Death in Loudun of several people suspected of having been poisoned with arsenic by one of their relatives or acquaintances, Marie Besnard.	
1928	Paris	Paul Grappe	Murder of Paul Grappe shot dead by his wife Louise Landy on 21 July 1928.	The case inspired André Téchiné's Golden Years, released in 2017.
1928	Alpes de Haute-Provence	Valensole massacre	Deaths in Valensole, of five people including two children in an isolated farm. The two assassins (Jules Ughetto and Micha Witkowski) are quickly arrested, tried and sentenced to death	

== 1931–1940 ==
Year	Department	Case	Summary	Convictions and comments
1932	Paris, Seine	Affaire Gorgulov	Assassination of President Paul Doumer on 6 May 1932 by Paul Gorgulov.	
1933	Sarthe	Christine and Léa Papin	Murder by two sisters, Christine and Léa Papin, domestic employees, of their boss and her daughter on 2 February 1933 in Le Mans.	L'affaire, dans laquelle on a pu voir un drame lié à la lutte des classes sociales, aurait notamment inspiré la pièce Les Bonnes de Jean Genet. Elle inspire également le film Les Blessures assassines et, moins directement le film La Cérémonie de Claude Chabrol.
1933	Paris, Seine	Violette Nozière	Poisoning of his family members by Violette Nozière on 21 August 1933.	The case inspired the 1977 film Violette Nozière by Claude Chabrol.
1933	Paris, Seine	Oscar Dufrenne	Murder of Oscar Dufrenne, director of Le Palace, in his office on 24 September 1933.	"The Palace Crime"
1934	Haute-Savoie	Stavisky affair	Death in suspicious circumstances of Alexander Stavisky, on 8 January 1934 in Chamonix.	The affair led to a political and financial scandal and contributed to the fall of the Camille Chautemps government and the outbreak of the anti-parliamentary riots of 6 February 1934. It inspired the film Stavisky by Alain Resnais, released in 1974.
1934	Martinique	André Aliker	André Aliker, a Martinican communist activist, was found dead tied up on 12 January 1934 to Case-Pilote.	His death was a detonator for the workers' movement in the overseas territory of Martinique.
1934	Bouches-du-Rhône	Assassination of Alexander I of Yugoslavia	Assassination of King Alexander I of Yugoslavia by Bulgarian nationalist Vlado Chernozemsky on 9 October 1934 in Marseille.	Louis Barthou Minister of Foreign Affairs, wounded in the arm by friendly fire, died shortly afterwards.
1934	Var	Giuseppe Sasia	Murders of four people in Haut-Var.	Italian-born Giuseppe Sasia, nicknamed "the shepherd killer" or "the Haut-Var killer," murdered four people in a few months. He confessed to the murders before admitting to only two. Convicted in December 1935, he was guillotined in Draguignan on 17 February 1936.
1935	Seine-et-Oise	Murder of Henri Pélissier	Murder of cyclist Henri Pélissier shot dead by his mistress Camille Tharault on 1 May 1935 in Dampierre-en-Yvelines.	
1937	Seine-et-Oise, Seine-et-Marne	Affaire Weidmann	Kidnappings and murders of six people, from 21 July to 27 November 1937 by Eugène Weidmann.	The last convict to be guillotined in public in France.
1938	Ille-et-Vilaine	Maurice Pilorge	Murder of a young Mexican, Nestor Escudero, by Maurice Pilorge on 6 August 1938 in a hotel in Dinard. Pilorge was guillotined in Rennes on 4 February 1939.	The affair, which seems to have marked the writer Jean Genet, is mentioned – at least the name of Pilorge – notably in Notre-Dame des Fleurs.
1940–1943	Manche	Marie-Louise Giraud	Twenty-seven illegal abortions in the Cherbourg region by Marie-Louise Giraud.	She is the only woman – but not the only person – to have been guillotined for this reason in France. She inspired the film Une affaire de femmes by Claude Chabrol. Following this affair, a law was passed which promulgated that only a doctor could prescribe an abortion.

== 1941–1950 ==
Year	Department	Case	Summary	Convictions and comments
1941	Drôme	Marx Dormoy affair	Assassination of politician Marx Dormoy, by Ludovic Guichard, Yves Moynier and Maurice Vaillant, from the La Cagoule, with the complicity of an actress, Annie Mourraille, who served as "bait". It is the death of Maurice Vaillant, with two accomplices, in the explosion of their bomb intended for an anti-Semitic terrorist act, in Nice, on the night of 14 to 15 August 1941, which puts investigators on the right track.	The defendants will never be tried, and will be released from Largentière prison on 23 January 1943, by German soldiers.
1941	Paris	Marcel Gitton	Assassination of Marcel Gitton, politician on 5 September 1941 in a street in Les Lilas by Marcel Cretagne, member of the Détachement Valmy, an action group under the direction of the French Communist Party aimed in particular at executing "traitors".	
1941–1944	Paris	Affaire Petiot	Assassination of twenty-seven people during the Occupation, by Doctor Marcel Petiot.	The case notably inspired the film Docteur Petiot, released in 1990.
1941–1944	Paris	French Gestapo affair of rue Lauriston	Many resistance fighters were tortured in this house during the Occupation by French auxiliary agents of the Gestapo from the Bonny – Lafontgroup.	World War II period. Those responsible were brought to justice in December 1944, they are sentenced to death and executed by firing squad.
1943 ?	Moselle	Affaire Moulin	Jean Moulin, a senior French civil servant and resistance fighter, was tortured by the head of the Lyon Gestapo, Klaus Barbie, before dying of his injuries on the train transporting him to Germany shortly before crossing the border.	World War II period. The official date of his death on 8 July 1943, leaves a doubt. The next day, the body of "a French national who died in German territory" – presumed to be Jean Moulin – is repatriated to Paris, Gare de l'Est and immediately cremated, and the urn transferred to the Panthéon contains only the "presumed ashes of the deceased". His torturer, Klaus Barbie, would die in prison nearly 50 years later.
1943	Paris	Julius Ritter	Julius Ritter, an SS colonel who supervised the STO in France, was killed on 28 September 1943 by a team of FTP-MOI.	
1944	France	Klaus Barbie affair	Klaus Barbie, German war criminal, SS officer under the Nazi regime, on the run for more than 40 years, was finally extradited from Bolivia to France and was found guilty of seventeen crimes against humanity and sentenced to life imprisonment "for the deportation of hundreds of Jews from France and in particular the arrest on 6 April 1944, of 44 Jewish children and 7 adults at the children's home in Izieu and their deportation to Auschwitz. Barbie died in prison in 1991.	"The Butcher of Lyon"
1944	Paris	Alain de Bernardy de Sigoyer	Assassination of Jeanine Kergot by her husband Alain de Bernardy de Sigoyer, on 29 March 1944.	
1944	Manche	Clarence Whitfield affair	Rape of a young Polish refugee in a Normandy farm in Sainte-Mère-Église by Clarence Whitfield, a black American GI, a few days after the landing of 6 June 1944 .	Whitfield was convicted and hanged.
1944	Allier	Jean Zay affair	Assassination of Jean Zay, lawyer 20 June 1944 by Charles Develle, head of security for the Militia.	Develle was arrested in Naples , tried in February 1953, Develle was sentenced to forced labor for life by the military tribunal of Lyon, then released two years later.
1944	Ain	Rillieux cemetery murders	Execution of the seven Jews at the Rillieux cemetery 29 June 1944 by the French militia under the responsibility of Paul Touvier, in retaliation for the assassination of the Vichy Secretary of State for Information Philippe Henriot, executed by resistance fighters (having posed as militiamen), in Paris, on June 28, 1944.	Touvier was hunted down during the Liberation, but he nevertheless managed to hide with friends. A double death sentence was imposed upon meeting him in 1946 and 1947, he took advantage of a lack of surveillance to escape. He went on the run again in Catholic networks, then and finally arrested in 1989, tried and convicted in 1994 to life imprisonment. He is the first Frenchman to be convicted of crimes against humanity. Touvier is also suspected of having murdered the Basch couple in 1944. Touvier dies in prison in 1996 from widespread prostate cancer in Fresnes Prison at the age of 81.
1944	Hauts-de-Seine	Georges Barthélémy	Assassination of Georges Barthélémy, French mayor, on 10 July 1944.	
1944	Paris	François Van Aerden	Assassination of François Van Aerden, Belgian diplomat who had taken refuge in France, in mysterious circumstances on 1 September 1944.	
1945–1951	Paris	Gang des Tractions Avant	Banditry. Pierre Loutrel, known as "Pierrot le Fou", Émile Buisson, René Girier, known as "René la Canne"	The gang inspired several films, including The Good and the Bad in 1976 and Rene the Cane in 1977.
1946	Indre	Carteron murders	Murder of the Carteron family on 21 July 1946 at "Ajoncs-Barrats" near Bommiers	
1946	Indre	Mis and Thiennot affair	Assassination of gamekeeper Louis Boistard, on 29 December 1946 in Mézières-en-Brenne by Raymond Mis and Gabriel Thiennot.	
1947	Maine-et-Loire	Germaine Leloy-Godefroy	Axe-murder of Albert Leloy on 10 December 1947 in Baugé, by his wife Germaine.	She is the last person sentenced to death to be executed in France.
1950–1993	Pas-de-Calais, Haute-Savoie	Michel Sydor	Serial killer Michel Sydor. The murder of a prostitute, around 1950, the murder of his wife and attempted murder of his father-in-law near Lens, on 22 December 1961. Years later he committed the kidnapping, rape and murder of 7-year-old Jessica Blanc in Vacheresse, on 25 July 1993.	"The Legionnaire"

== 1951–1960 ==
Year	Department	Case	Summary	Convictions and comments
1951	Guadeloupe	Assassination of Amédée Fengarol	Alleged assassination of Amédée Fengarol, 45, mayor of Pointe-à-Pitre in Guadeloupe on 11 January 1951.	
1951	Paris	Pauline Dubuisson	Assassination of Félix Bailly by his ex-lover Pauline Dubuisson, a medical student, on 17 March 1951.	This case inspired the character in the film La Vérité (film, 1960) by Henri-Georges Clouzot.
1951	Loiret	Pierre Chevallier	Assassination of Pierre Chevallier, Member of Parliament (MP) and Secretary of State, on 12 August 1951 in Orléans by his wife Yvonne.	
1952	Alpes-de-Haute-Provence	Dominici affair	Murder of three members of an English family, Jack, Anne and Elizabeth Drummond, on the night of 4 to 5 August 1952 in Lurs. Gaston Dominici was suspected for a long time but later cleared.	The case notably inspired The Dominici Affair (film, 1973) from 1973, with Jean Gabin in the role of patriarch Gaston Dominici.
1953	Pyrénées-Orientales	Marty case	Alleged poisoning of Jeanne Candela with phenethylamine by her cousin Marguerite Marty.	
1954	Paris	Jacques Fesch	Robbery followed by the murder of Jean-Baptiste Vergne, peacekeeper, on 25 February 1954 by Jacques Fesch.	Guillotined on 1 October 1957, he is considered by some Catholics as an example of redemption.
1954–2007	Var, Alpes-Maritimes	Albert Millet	Series of murders in Hyères by Albert Millet between 1954 and 2007. Also an attempted murder on 17 February 2002 in Nice.	"The Moorish Boar"
1955	Protectorat français au Maroc	Jacques Lemaigre-Dubreuil	Assassination of Jacques Lemaigre Dubreuil, 60-year-old French businessman and political activist, shot dead on 11 June 1955 in Casablanca.	The main witness was found "murdered or committed suicide" a month after the events.
1955	Somme	Murder of Janet Marshall	Murder of Janet Marshall, a 29-year-old British schoolteacher, on 28 August 1955 at the La Chaussée-Tirancourt by Robert Avril.	
1956	Meuse	Uruffe priest case	Murder of Régine Fays, 19 years old, on 3 December 1956 on the road leading to Pagny-la-Blanche-Côte by the Catholic priest Guy Desnoyers, because she was pregnant by him.	
1955	Montfort-l'Amaury	Montfort-l'Amaury double murder case	The accused and the two victims were negotiating a military contract. He had passed them the file of "Captain Lahana-Landrieux", former leader of the BCRA then of the SDECE, who committed suicide in 1946. Common actors with the Lemaigre Dubreuil Affair killed by La Main Rouge on 11 June 1955, the main witness "assassinated or committed suicide" a month later and the White Valley Affair of 8 April 1956.	The double murder of Montfort-l'Amaury took place only one kilometer from the Rompu Pond scne of the Robert Boulin Affair
1956	Chamonix	White Valley Affair	Death at 3000 meters altitude, along with former ski champion Henryk Mückenbrunn and Paul Demarchi, the most famous of the Chamonix guides, of the international trafficker of precious metals Frédéric Ebel, close to Jacques Franchi, of the "cigarette gang" . Ebel is wanted by the police. His accomplice managed to get to Italy before. The anger caused by the loss of Demarchi played a role in the Vincendon and Henry Case eight months later.	The Vallée Blanche affair inspired a novel written by a friend of the victims.
1958–1959	Seine-et-Marne, Val-de-Marne	Georges Rapin	Crimes committed by Georges Rapin.	"Mr. Bill"
1959–1980	Hérault, Var, Corse-du-Sud.	Tommy Recco	Tommy Recco murdered his godfather in Propriano in 1960, then three cashiers in 1979 in Béziers, and three people in 1980 in Carqueiranne. He is suspected of being behind the disappearance of three German tourists in Propriano in 1959.	Tommy Recco, imprisoned since 1980, is the oldest prisoner in France.

== 1961–1970 ==
Year	Department	Case	Summary	Convictions and comments
1961	French Algeria	Barthélémy Rossello	Barthélémy Rossello, a 25-year-old agent of the Commando Jaubert, was shot dead by the OAS on 19 March 1961.	
1961	Haute-Savoie	Blanc Affair	Assassination of Camille Blanc, mayor of Evian, on 31 March 1961in Évian-les-Bains by the OAS.	
1961	French Algeria	Roger Gavoury	Roger Gavoury, 25 years old, central commissioner of Algiers, was assassinated in the exercise of his duties as central commissioner of Algiers on 31 May 1961. He was the first civil servant killed by the OAS.	Ten people involved in his assassination were brought before the military tribunal by decree of the President of the Republic on 6 February 1962, including deserter lieutenant Roger Degueldre (then on the run), deserter sergeant Albert Dovecar and Claude Piegts: for the latter, the trial took place at the Palais de justice de Paris from 26 to 30 March 1962. Arrested on 7 April 1962, Roger Degueldre appeared on 28 June 1962 before the Military Court of Justice, at Fort Neuf de Vincennes. The first two were executed on 7 June 1962, the third on 6 July 1962.
1961	Marne	1961 Vitry-Le-François train bombing	Bomb attack carried out by the OAS on 18 June 1961 leaving 24 dead and 132 injured.	
1961	Rhône	Deveaux Affair	Assassination of Dominique Bessard on 7 July 1961in Bron-Parilly in the suburbs of Lyon. Case of miscarriage of justice: Jean-Marie Deveaux, retried, was acquitted in 1969.	The second trial is at the origin in France of the law on compensation for persons acquitted, discharged or having had their case dismissed, having suffered detention which caused them particularly serious harm.
1961–1979	France, Québec, Suisse, Espagne, Italie, Belgique	Jacques Mesrine	Banditry, robberies, escapes, kidnapping, attempted assassination by Jacques Mesrine.	Jacques Mesrine was shot dead by police on 2 November 1979.
1962	Algérie française	Camille Petitjean	Camille Petitjean, an engineer from Arts et Métiers, was kidnapped on 26 February 1962 in Rouïba.	His body was found riddled with bullets near Orléansville in March 1962.
1962	Hauts-de-Seine	1962 Issy-les-Moulineaux bombing	Car bomb attack in Issy-les-Moulineaux on 10 March 1962, resulting in the death of three people and injuring forty-seven.	
1962	Hauts-de-Seine	Petit-Clamart attack	Attempted assassination of President of France Charles de Gaulle, on the evening of 22 August 1962 in Clamart, in the southern suburbs, near Paris.	A group (OAS-Métropole / OAS-CNR) led by lieutenant-colonel Jean Bastien-Thiry wanted to assassinate President de Gaulle. The attempt failed and they were brought to justice: only Bastien-Thiry was sentenced to death and shot, becoming the last person to be executed by firing squad in France
1962–1963	Loire	Saïb Hachani	Series of murders perpetrated by Saïb Hachani for financial gain.	On 22 March 1966, Saïb Hachani was guillotinéd.
1963	Hauts-de-Seine	Henri Lafond affair	Henri Lafond, a banker, was assassinated on 6 March 1963 with three shots from an 11.43 pistol by Jean de Brem, journalist and former paratrooper.	On 18 April 1963, de Brem was shot dead by police on Sainte-Geneviève mountain, while trying to steal a car to escape.
1964	Essonne	Lucien Léger	Lucien Léger murdered 11-year-old Luc Taron on 27 May 1964 in the woods of Verrières-le-Buisson.	
1964	Var	Saint-Aubin affair	On 5 July 1964 near Fréjus, two young people, Jean-Claude Saint-Aubin and Dominique Kaydash were killed in a car accident. The Saint-Aubin parents claimed that their son was the victim of an attack by the French secret services. A military truck was believed to have caused the accident.	In 1990, the Ministry of Justice awarded Mr and Mrs Saint-Aubin compensation of 500,000 francs for the poor functioning of the judicial system.
1965	Bouches-du-Rhône	Robert Blémant	Assassination of Robert Blémant, former police officer and resistance fighter on 15 May 1965 in his car.	Blémant's two assassins were also murdered in 1966 and 1969, along with their accomplice who was driving the car during the murder.
1965	Paris	Disappreacne of Mehdi Ben Barka	Kidnapping and disappearance of Moroccan politician Mehdi Ben Barka on 29 October 1965.	
1966	Cher	Georges Segretin case	Assassination of Georges Ségretin, head of the Société Générale office in La Guerche by Ernest Rodric.	"The Bois Bleu Affair." Monique Case is finally cleared.
1966	Marne, Ardennes	Nylon Mask Gang	Multiple robberies and involuntary manslaughter	Janos C. was sentenced to 12 years in prison. Ferenc E. committed suicide.
1967	Moselle	Günther Volz	Günther Volz raped and murdered 9-year-old Solange Kintzinger in Basse-Yutz on 13 March 1967.	
1967	Bouches-du-Rhône	Antoine Guérini	Murder of gangster Antoine Guérini, in his car on 23 June 1967.	
1967	Bouches-du-Rhône ?	Guérini brothers case	Barthélemy Guérini, François Guérini and Pascal Guérini were arrested for the murder of a burglar who attacked Antoine Guérini's villa during his funeral. The burglar's name was Mondroyan and he had returned to the scene to return what he had stole.	François died in prison shortly after and Barthélemy was sentenced to twenty years in prison, despite having constantly proclaimed his innocence, and Pascal to fifteen years. Barthélemy died of rectal cancer in 1982, in a clinic in Montpellier.
1967	Aisne	Jean-Laurent Olivier	Murders of Pierrette Demarle, twelve years old, and her brother Lucien, ten years old, on 17 June 1967 in Montlevon by Jean-Laurent Olivier, farm worker.	
1968	Yvelines	Marković affair	Assassination of Stevan Marković, employee of Alain Delon.	The murder remains officially unsolved, but the case sets the media in motion when it involves Claude Pompidou, the wife of the former prime minister and future president of France, with certain Parisian circles attempting to graft onto this crime a state scandal targeting Georges Pompidou.
1968	Savoie	Thévenin affair	Suspicious death of a young man, Jean-Pierre Thévenin, in a cell at the Chambéry police station.	This case gave rise to militant demonstrations and inspired a play, I have confidence in the justice of my country by Alain Scoff (1973).
1968–1990	Paris, Orne	Jean-Charles Willoquet	Banditry, robberies, escape by Jean-Charles Willoquet.	
1969	Paris	Delaunay Pharmacy Case	Bloody robbery of the Delaunay pharmacy, costing the lives of two people and injuring two others on 19 December 1969. Pierre Goldman, initially found guilty, saw the court's decision overturned. He was murdered himself ten years later.	Following the Goldman trial, left-wing intellectual and artistic figures such a Jean-Paul Sartre, Simone de Beauvoir, Simone Signoret and Maxime Le Forestier – who wrote his song La Vie d'un homme about him – took up his cause.
1969–1976	Oise	Marcel Barbeault	Series of murders committed by Marcel Barbeault, in the Nogent-sur-Oise region.	"The Shadow Killer"

== 1971–1980 ==
Year	Department	Case	Summary	Convictions and comments
1971	Aube	Affair of Claude Buffet and Roger Bontems	Hostage taking, two of whom are killed on 21 September 1971 at prison de Clairvaux.	The case, which led in 1972 to the execution of the two men, Buffet and Bontems, had an influence on one of the latter's two lawyers, Robert Badinter, convinced that his client had not killed anyone, and who less than ten years later would be the main architect of the abolition of the death penalty in France.
1971–1999	Seine-et-Marne	Lydia Gouardo case	Kidnapping, rape and torture of Lydia Gouardo by her legitimate (but not biological) father Raymond Gouardo for 28 years.	Raymond died unpunished from an illness. Lucienne Ulpat, Lydia's stepmother, was sentenced to four years in prison, suspended, for failure to prevent a crime in 2008.
1971	Alpes-Maritimes	Ali Ben Yanes	Mother assaulted and her seven-year-old daughter murdered on 28 September 1971 by Ali Ben Yanes.	"The Gattières throat-cutter”
1971–1993	Cher, Pyrénées-Orientales, Aude	Patrick Tissier	Series of rapes and murders by Patrick Tissier.	"The Ogre of Perpignan"
1972	Hauts-de-Seine	Murder of Pierre Overney	Murder of Pierre Overney, a Maoist activist of the Proletarian Left, on 25 February 1972 by Jean-Antoine Tramoni, Renault security officer.	Tramoni was assassinated in Limeil-Brévannes by two killers on a motorbike on 23 March 1977.
1972	Pas-de-Calais	Murder of Brigitte Dewèvre	Murder of Brigitte Dewèvre, sixteen years old, on 6 April 1972.	Far-left activists took advantage of the bourgeois background of two suspects to turn the case into a symbol of class struggle in a region hit by the closure of coal mines, but the two suspects were eventually released due to lack of evidence.
1972	Seine-Saint-Denis	Bobigny trial	Abortion of a minor girl Marie-Claire Chevalier following rape, at a time when abortion was still criminalized.	The case had a huge impact and contributed to the move towards the decriminalization (1975) of voluntary termination of pregnancy.
1972	Charente	Méchinaud family disappearance	Disappearance of the Méchinaud family on 25 December 1972, near Cognac.	This case is absolutely unique to date in the annals of French justice, since it is the only case in France where, after the disappearance of an entire family, none of the bodies have ever been found, nor the car, and where there is neither the slightest testimony nor the slightest clue, nor anything that would allow the investigation to be directed. Bad nighttime encounter? Mass suicide? Murder of the family by the father, before he himself took his own life or fled? Hasty flight of the family abroad to start a new life there? All these avenues (and others) have been explored by the gendarmes in charge of the investigation, in vain.
1973	Rhône	Jean Augé	Assassination of the criminal Jean Augé on 15 June 1973 in Caluire-et-Cuire.	
1974	Bouches-du-Rhône	Christian Ranucci case	Kidnapping and murder of Marie-Dolorès Rambla, eight years old, on 3 June 1974 in the Marseille region by Christian Ranucci.	Condamné à mort le 10 et exécuté le 28 juillet de la même année. L'affaire a inspiré le livre, adapté au cinéma, Le Pull-over rouge Sentenced to death on 10 March 1976 and executed on 28 July of the same year. The case inspired the book, adapted for the cinema, Le Pull-over rouge (film)(Ramsay, 1978), instilling doubt as to Ranucci's guilt, which book (and film) was able to weigh in the debates concerning the abolition of the death penalty in France, and in any case on public opinion. Following the publication of Le Pull-over rouge, three requests for review were filed and rejected.
1974	Bouches-du-Rhône	Hamida Djandoubi	Kidnapping, rape, torture and murder of Elisabeth Bousquet on 3 July 1974in the Marseille region by Hamida Djandoubi.	Last death row inmate executed in France.
1974	Bouches-du-Rhône	Tonglet-Castellano case	Rape of two young Belgian women in August 1974 in a cove in Marseille, by three young local residents.	Thanks to the tenacity of the victims' lawyers, and particularly Gisèle Halimi, the trial was held before the Bouches-du-Rhône Assize Court (and not before the criminal court) in 1978. The three men were sentenced to moderate prison terms (six and four years). The trial sparked a social debate and a wider awareness of what rape was, leading to its criminalization in 1980.
1974–1983	Paris, Haute-Vienne, Drôme, Bouches-du-Rhône	Carlos the Jackal	Carlos, a Venezuelan terrorist, carried out the attack on the Publicis drugstore that killed two people and injured 34 others. On 15 September 1974, murders of Raymond Dous and Jean Donatini, inspectors at the DST and of Michel Moukharbalun, Lebanese national on the night of 27 June 1975 by the same author, attack on the Capitol which cost the lives of 5 people and injured 28 committed by the latter, he used a car bomb in front of the headquarters of the newspaper Al-Watan al-Arabi on 22 April 1982 (one dead, 63 injured), in the TGV near Tain-l'Hermitage and at the Marseille-Saint-Charles station on 31 December 1983 (5 dead and 50 injured).	The Venezuelan serial killer, nicknamed Carlos, the "killer without borders", he reigned terror in France and Europe for nearly twenty years, committing a series of murders and attacks. He was sentenced to life imprisonment.
1975	Charente-Maritime	Guy Mauvillain	Murder of Elise Meilhan, a 76-year-old retired music teacher, on 9 January 1975 in La Rochelle.	Sentenced to eighteen years in prison at the end of 1975, Guy Mauvillain was retried and acquitted on 29 June 1985.
1975	Rhône	François Renaud	Assassination of Judge François Renaud on 3 July 1975 in Lyon.	Renaud is the first magistrate to be assassinated since the Occupation in France. After seventeen years of investigation, investigating judge Georges Fenech issued a non-lieu on 17 September 1992. His life inspired the film "Le Juge Fayard dit Le Shériff" (1977).
1975	Nord	Jérôme Carrein	Murder of eight-year-old Cathy Petit on 27 October 1975 in Arleux by Jérôme Carrein.	Penultimate death row inmate executed on 23 June 1977 in Douai.
1975–2000	Yonne	The case of the missing women of the Yonne	Rapes and murders of several young mentally handicapped women by Émile Louis. Some bodies were never found.	The investigation, which had been abandoned, was relaunched by the audiovisual media and the case was thus resolved.
1975–2007	Nord	Francis Evrard case	Kidnapping and rape of 5-year-old Enis Kocakurt on 15 August 2007 in Roubaix by Francis Evrard, a serial rapist.	The television channel France 2 obtained authorization to film the trial, for a program broadcast on 14 October 2010.
1976	Aube	Patrick Henry	Kidnapping and murder of 8-year-old boy Philippe Bertrand by Patrick Henry in Troyes.	Journalist Roger Gicquel will open the TF1 news with the phrase "France is afraid". A central issue in the debates concerning the abolition (1981) of the death penalty in France. Henry, who suffered from lung cancer, died on 3 December 2017, after 40 years of detention, less than three months after his release from prison.
1976	French Territory of the Afars and the Issas	Loyada hostage crisis	5-year-old Nadine Durand and 8-year-old Valérie Geissbuhler were killed on 4 February 1976 in Loyada, Djibouti during the assault on the school bus following the hostage-taking by independence activists from the Front de libération de la Côte des Somalis.	
1976	Paris	Jean de Broglie	Assassination of MP Jean de Broglie on 24 December 1976.	
1977	Alpes-Maritimes	Murder of Agnès Le Roux	The disappearance of Agnès Le Roux, a wealthy heiress to a casino in Nice. Her lover, Jean-Maurice Agnelet, was finally convicted in 2014, nearly forty years after the events.	The case inspired a film by André Téchiné, In the Name of My Daughter, released in 2014.
1977	Somme	Michel Cardon	64-year-old René Roullet, a retired plumber, was tortured and killed at his home in Amiens on the night of 25 to 26 October 1977 by Michel Cardon and Jean-Yves Defosse.	
1978	Paris	Édouard-Jean Empain	Kidnapping on 23 January 1978 in Paris, followed by his sequestration until 28 March, of Édouard-Jean Empain, wealthy heir and president of the Schneider Electric group.	The case is the main subject of the film Rapt (2009) by Lucas Belvaux, released in 2009, starring Yvan Attal as the Belgian baron.
1978	Seine-Maritime	François Duprat	Assassination of far-right politician François Duprat in a car bomb attack on 18 March 1978 near Caudebec-en-Caux.	
1978	Paris	Henri Curiel	The murder of Henri Curiel, a French far-left activist, in unclear circumstances, while he was on his way to his yoga class on 4 May 1978.	This news item inspired Gilles Perrault to write the book A Man Apart in 1984, which retraces the life and activist commitments of Curiel, particularly in Egypt, alongside the police investigation into his assassination. In January 2018, the French justice system has reopened the investigation into the assassination of Henri Curiel following the posthumous confession of René Resciniti de Says, a member of the Action Française.
1978	Paris	1978 Orly Airport attack	This attack left two police officers dead and five injured, as well as the three terrorists killed.	This attack was the origin of an inter-ministerial circular organizing the beginnings of the plan Vigipirate.
1978	Bouches-du-Rhône	Marseille bar massacre	Shooting, costing the lives of ten people, on 3 October 1978 in Marseille.	
1978–1985	Tarn, Paris, Hérault, Moselle, Essonne	Bruno Sulak Affair: "The Arsène Lupin of Jewelry Stores"	Bruno Sulak is a famous robber known for his good manners, his friendly demeanor, his audacity, and his robberies without physical violence. He is also famous for several prison escapes.	He died on 29 March 1985 in Paris during an escape attempt.
1978–1979	Oise	Alain Lamare	Series of murders committed by Alain Lamare, a model policeman.	"The Oise Killer." The case inspires Next Time I'll Aim for the Heart, released in 2014, as well as an episode of the series Tandem in 2022.
1978	Morbihan	Disappearance of Danielle Judic	26-year-old Danielle Judic disappeared in Belle-Île-en-Mer. Neither she or her car were seen again.	Case not solved as of 2026.
1979	Paris	Assassination of Pierre Goldman	Murder of Pierre Goldman – tried ten years earlier in the Delaunay Pharmacy Case – on 20 September 1979.	The crime was claimed by a mysterious far-right group, Honneur de la Police, but was never solved.
1979	Yvelines	Robert Boulin case	Robert Boulin, Minister of Labour, died in suspicious circumstances on 30 October 1979in a pond in the Forest of Rambouillet.	
1979–1987	Paris, Yvelines	Action Directe	Series of attacks and assassinations, including those of Georges Besse and the engineer general René Audran, by a terrorist group.	
1979–1988	Bouches-du-Rhône, Gard	Luc Tangorre cases	A series of rapes from 1979 to 1981 in Marseille, then two rapes in 1988 near Nîmes by Luc Tangorre.	The case was highly publicized, and intellectuals took up Tangorre's defense, including Pierre Vidal-Naquet, Marguerite Duras and Françoise Sagan as well as politicians Robert Badinter, Albin Chalandon, Jean-Claude Gaudin and Dominique Baudis. Tangorre would repeat the offense, demonstrating that they seemed to have been wrong.
1980	Marseille	Lahouri Ben Mohamed case	Racist murder of a teenager by a police officer.	This crime was part of the increase in anti-Algerian racist murders of 1981–1983.
1980	Paris	Assassination of Joseph Fontanet	Assassination of 59-year-old deputy Joseph Fontanet on 2 February 1980.	
1980	Paris	1980 Paris synagogue bombing	Anti-Semitic attack targeting the synagogue on Copernic Street, Paris on 3 October 1980.	
1980	Isère	Pignot affair	Disappearance of 13-year-old Philippe Pignot on 25 May 1980 in La Morte-sur-Isère.	
1980–1998	Vosges, Haut-Rhin	Jacques Fruminet	Serial killer who committed the following crimes: 28 May 1980: Rape and murder of Lucie-Andrée Perrotez-Bottini in Évaux-et-Ménil; September 1989: robbery with violence and assault in Colmar, December 1991: two sexual assaults in Colmar; 13 November 1998: murder of a woman in Mulhouse; 20 November 1998: murder of a woman in Colmar	Convicted in June 1981, to 15 years of criminal imprisonment, by the VosgesAssize Court. Sentenced to four years in prison, in February 1990, by the criminal court of Colmar. Sentenced to nine years in prison, in February 1992, by the criminal court of Saint-Dié-des-Vosges. Sentenced to life imprisonment with a security period of 22 years, in December 2001, by the Colmar Assize "The Killer with a Thousand Faces"
1980	Paris	Louis Althusser	Murder of his wife by the philosopher Louis Althusser on 16 November 1980.	
1980–1983	Essonne	RN 20 Murders	Murders of four young blonde women left on the side of the RN 20.	
1980–1987	Marne	Mourmelon missing persons case	Disappearances of young conscripts and civilians around the Camp de Châlons.	Chief Warrant Officer Pierre Chanal, the prime suspect, committed suicide at the start of his trial.

== 1981–1990 ==
Year	Department	Case	Summary	Convictions and comments
1981	Bouches-du-Rhône	Auriol massacre	On 18 July 1981 in Auriol, execution of Jacques Massié, head of the Service d'Action Civique of Bouches-du-Rhône, and seven members of his family.	Jean-Joseph Maria was sentenced in May 1985 to life imprisonment, Lionel Collard to life imprisonment, Ange Poletti to life imprisonment by the Bouches-du-Rhône Assize Court
1981	Bouches-du-Rhône	Assassination of Pierre Michel	On 21 October 1981 in Marseille, investigating judge Pierre Michel was assassinated by an armed commando.	François Checchi was sentenced on 30 June 1988 to life imprisonment with a security period of 18 years. François Girard was sentenced to life imprisonment with a security period of 18 years by the Bouches-du-Rhône Assize Court. Charles Altiéri was sentenced on 19 April 1991 to life imprisonment by the Bouches-du-Rhône Assize Court . Charles Altiéri was released in October 2014 after 21 years in detention, François Checchi in September 2014 after 28 years in detention, François Girard in February 2017 after 31 years in detention.
1981–1986	Paris	The Gang des postiches	A series of robberies involving hostage-taking by disguised gangsters from 6 October 1981 to 14 January 1986.	
1981–1986	Isère	Pontcharra disappearances	Disappearance of three young women, between 1981 and 1986, in the town of Pontcharra in Isère.	Only one murder case has been solved, that of Marie-Thérèse Bonfanti, 36 years after the events. In May 2022, the murderer (Yves Chatain) admitted the facts. The murder is confessed but nevertheless prescribed.
1981–1997	Paris	Guy Georges	Series of rapes and seven murders of young women by Guy Georges.	"The killer of eastern Paris"
1982	Paris	Marcel Francisci	Assassination of the politician Marcel Francisci, 62 years old, nicknamed "the emperor of games", in the parking lot of the building where he lived, Rue de la Faisanderie, on 16 January 1982.	He has already been the target of two assassination attempts (in Corsica in 1958 and nine years later at his home west of Paris).
1982	Bouches-du-Rhône	Murder of Christelle Bancourt	Rape and murder of Christelle Bancourt, aged twelve, in June 1982 in Marseille by Christian Marletta.	Sentenced in March 1985 to life imprisonment. Released in 2006 .
1982	Cher	Jean-Pierre Maïone-Libaude	Jean-Pierre Maïone-Libaude, a former member of the Organisation armée secrète (OAS), was assassinated on 13 June 1982 in Argent-sur-Sauldre.	
1982	Paris	Chez Jo Goldenberg restaurant attack	Anti-Semitic attack targeting a Jewish restaurant on Rue des Rosiers in the 4th arrondissement of Paris on 9 August 1982.	
1982	Nord	Brabant killers	Bloody robberies at the Piot grocery store in Maubeuge on 13 August 1982. A police officer was injured, and some boxes of tea and bottles of wine were stolen.	
1982–1992	Haute-Corse	The Gang de la Brise de Mer	Series of robberies.	
1982	Gard	Coral Affair	Sexual abuse of minors in an educational "living space".	The highly publicized affair is notable for the implication of several public figures, which gives rise to suspicions of manipulation of political or police origin.
1983	Alpes-Maritimes	Bernard Nut	Assassination of Bernard Nut, head of the DGSE, shot dead on 15 February 1983 in car in Rigaud.	
1983	Isère	Disappearance of Ludovic Janvier	Abduction of Ludovic Janvier, 6 years old, on 17 March 1983 in Saint-Martin-d'Hères.	One of the Disparus de l'Isère
1983	Corse-du-Sud	Guy Orson	Guy Orsoni, 24 years old, nationalist activist of the FLNC was tortured then executed.	His assassins were themselves murdered in the Ajaccio remand center.
1983	Isère	Disappearance of Grégory Dubrulle	Disappearance of Grégory Dubrulle on 9 July 1983, at Rue Adrien Ricard in Grenoble.	He regained consciousness the next day, with serious head injuries, in a landfill in Pommiers-la-Placette.
1983	Paris	1983 Orly Airport attack	Bomb attack in the south terminal hall of Orly Airport by a Syrian branch of ASALA, causing 8 deaths and more than 56 injuries.	
1983	Haute-Corse	Assassination of Pierre-Jean Massimi	Assassination of the Secrétaire général de préfecture of Haute-Corse, Pierre-Jean Massimi on 13 September 1983.	
1983	Hauts-de-France	Labrousse family murders	On the night of 5–6 October 1983, six members of the Labrousse family were murdered at the family home in Saint-Martin-le-Nœud. The family was killed by Pascal Dolique, an apprentice butcher who was the ex-boyfriend of Caroline, the eldest child, who could not accept their separation. Dolique fatally stabbed the parents, Jean-Jacques and Franciane, aged 41 and 37; the maternal grandparents Georges and Christiane Becquet, aged 62 and 63; Caroline, aged 18; and her younger brother Fabrice, aged 12, who were present in the house. Only Jean-Yves, aged 15, survived his injuries but with from several cognitive disorders. A neighbour, Roland Bizet, 62, also died of a heart attack while calling the police.	Pascal Dolique, 23, was sentenced to life imprisonment, and, by special decision, the criminal court increased the security period to eighteen years.
1983	Gironde – Paris	Lionel Cardon	On 111 October 1983 in Pessac, Lionel Cardon killed a couple of doctors: François-Xavier Aran, a surgeon, was strangled. His wife Aline, an anesthesiologist, was shot dead. While on the run, he killed a national police motorcyclist with a bullet to the heart on 22 November 1983 in Paris.	Lionel Cardon was sentenced on 16 April 1986, to life imprisonment with a security period of 18 years by the Gironde Assize Court. He was released in October 2012 after 29 years in prison.
1983	Bouches-du-Rhône	Gilbert le Libanais	Gilbert Hoareau, a member of the clan of Tany Zampa, deceased godfather of Marseille, was assassinated on 6 October 1983 by five large caliber bullets.	
1983	Tarn-et-Garonne	Murder of Habib Grimzi	On 14 November 1983 in Castelsarrasin, Habib Grimzi, an Algerian tourist, was killed on board a Bordeaux-Ventimiglia train by three recruits for the Foreign Legion Command.	Anselmo Elviro-Vidal was sentenced on 25 January 1986 to life imprisonment, Marc Béani to life imprisonment, Xavier Blondel to 14 years of criminal imprisonment by the Tarn-et-Garonne Assize Court . The consequences are unknown.
1983–1987	Meurthe-et-Moselle	Jacques Maire affair	Disappearance of two women in 1983 and 1985, and murder of a third in 1987 in the Dombasle-sur-Meurthe region. The suspected killer Jacques Maire was acquitted after a third trial.	
1983–1999	Bas-Rhin, Yvelines, Eure	Louis Poirson	Series of rapes in 1983–1984, then a series of rapes and murders in 1995–1999 by Louis Poirson.	Nicknamed "Rambo"
1984	Vosges	Murder of Grégory Villemin	Murder of 4-year-old Grégory Villemin, who was found tied up, drowned in the Vologne river on 16 October 1984. A suspect, Bernard Laroche, a member of the family, was shot dead by Jean-Marie Villemin, the victim's father, then Christine Villemin, the victim's mother, was in turn suspected of having killed Grégory. In 1993, she benefited from a dismissal for "total absence of charges", a first in criminal law.	The Gregory affair, due to the sordid nature of the crime and its many twists and turns, is undoubtedly the most publicized criminal case of the second half of the 20th century in France, and remains an enigma to this day. The case particularly aroused the interest of the writer Marguerite Duras who, while convinced of the guilt of the victim's mother, simultaneously justified the act of which she presumed her guilty.
1984	Paris	Disappearance of Teddy Vrignault	Disappearance of Teddy Vrignault, 55 years old, comedian and actor, on 1 November 1984.	His death was pronounced on 1 November 2004, twenty years after the date of his disappearance, as provided by law in unresolved cases of disappearance.
1984	Paris	Hattab-Sarraud-Subra affair	Heinous murders of two men on the 7 and 17 December 1984, by two young people, using a young girl, Valérie Subra, serving as their "bait".	The case inspired a book, The Bait, from which The Bait (film, 1995) was taken.
1984–1987	Paris	Thierry Paulin and Jean-Thierry Mathurin	A series of murders of around 21 old ladies from 1984 to 1987 in the Paris region by Thierry Paulin and Jean-Thierry Mathurin.	Paulin, who had AIDS, died before he could be tried. The case inspired I Can't Sleep, released in 1994.
1984–1992	Meurthe-et-Moselle, Moselle, Ardennes, Var, Finistère, Marne, Pas-de-Calais	Francis Heaulme	Series of at least nine murders by Francis Heaulme	"The Crime Backpacker"
1985	Hauts-de-Seine	Bruno Joushomme case	Murder of Evelyne Joushomme, 62, by her husband Bruno, a philosophy student, on 28 February 1985, burned out in their 2 CV on the side of a forest road in Chaville.	
1985	Ille-et-Vilaine, Côtes-d'Armor	Dol massacre	Spree shootings that resulted in seven deaths and five injuries on 19 June 1985.	
1985	Meurthe-et-Moselle	Simone Weber	Murder of Bernard Hettier by his former mistress in June 1985.	
1985	Isère	Disappearance of Anissa Ouadi	Kidnapping of 5-year-old Anissa Ouadi in Grenoble on 25 June 1985.	Isère missing persons case. She was found drowned on 9 July 1985 in Isère, at the Beauvoir dam.
1985–1986	Charente, Somme, Tarn-et-Garonne	Bourdin-Fasquel affair	Kidnapping, sequestration and rape of seven young women, two of whom were murdered, between December 1985 and February 1986.	
1985	Loire-Atlantique	Georges Courtois case	Georges Courtois a repeat robber, held around fifteen hostages at the Nantes courthouse with his accomplices, Khalki and Thiolet.	On 28 February 1988, for this hostage-taking and his previous hold-ups, Georges Courtois was sentenced to twenty years in prison, Khalki and Thiolet for the hostage-taking alone to twenty and fourteen years respectively. Courtois left the Saint-Maur central prison on 9 October 1997.
1985–1988	Paris, Seine-Maritime	Marie-Élisabeth Cons-Boutboul	Assassination of Jacques Perrot by Bruno Dassac ordered by Marie-Élisabeth Cons-Boutboul, the 27 December 1985. Dassac's body was found on 5 May 1988 in the Port of Le Havre.	Marie-Élisabeth Cons-Boutboul is sentenced, the 24 March 1994, to 15 years in prison for "complicity in murder".
1985–1999	Nord	Denis Waxin	Kidnapping and rape of two boys and four girls, murder of three girls by Denis Waxin in Lille and its surrounding suburbs.	
1986	Paris	Rue de Rennes bombing	On 17 September 1986, an explosive device exploded in a municipal trash can fixed to the ground on the sidewalk, killing seven people and injuring fifty-five.	
1986	Moselle	Montigny-lès-Metz murders	Murder of two children, Cyril Beining and Alexandre Beckrich, on 28 September 1986 in Montigny-lès-Metz. Patrick Dils, initially found guilty of the crime and imprisoned for several years, was finally acquitted during a second trial, the miscarriage of justice having been recognized.	Serial killer Francis Heaulme was sentenced to life imprisonment on 17 May 2017 for the murder of the two children.
1986	Paris	Killing of Malik Oussekine	Murder of Malik Oussekine, 22-year-old student, on the night of 5 to 6 December 1986. He was beaten to death by two "voltigeurs" (motorcycle police officers) in the context of student demonstrations against the Devaquet Bill.	Malik Oussekine, pursued by them to the apartment of a civil servant where he took refuge at 20, Rue Monsieur-le-Prince, was beaten to death and died of cardiac arrest in hospital.
1986	Saône-et-Loire	Murder of Christelle Maillery	Murder of 16-year-old Christelle Maillery, on 18 December 1986in the cellar of a building in Le Creusot, who was stabbed 33 times by Jean-Pierre Mura.	
1986–1988	Savoie, Haute-Savoie, Var	Roberto Succo	A series of crimes (murders, rapes, burglary) committed in the Savoy region by the Italian criminal Roberto Succo, who was first interned in Italy for having killed his father and mother.	Succo committed suicide in prison on 26 May 1988, using a gas canister and a plastic bag. The incident inspired a play by Bernard-Marie Koltès, created in 1990, and Roberto Succo, released in 2001.
1986–1994	Paris, Seine-et-Marne, Essonne	François Vérove	Rapes, murders, assaults and attempted rapes by "the Pockmarked man". notably the murder of Cécile Bloch	François Vérove, a former gendarme turned police officer, committed suicide in Grau-du-Roi on 29 September 2021, leaving behind a letter in which he confessed to his crimes. His confession was confirmed by DNA testing.
1986–1998	Somme, Pyrénées-Orientales	Gare de Perpignan murders	Isabelle Mesnage, a 20-year-old computer scientist, hitchhiking near Amiens, was abducted, beaten, raped and strangled by Jacques Rançon in 1986. On 21 December 1997, he kidnapped, killed and mutilated19-year-old Mokhtaria Chaïb, in the station district of Perpignan. On 16 June 1998, Marie-Hélène Gonzalez, 22, suffered the same fate.	On 26 March 2018, Ransom was sentenced to life imprisonment, with a 22-year safety period after several convictions.
1986	Haute-Garonne	Disappearance of Martine Escadeillas	On 8 December 1986, in Ramonville-Saint-Agne, Martine Escadeillas, 24, an accounting secretary, disappeared; her body was never found. In January 2014, a relative of the victim relaunched the investigation by pointing to a former jilted lover. He was arrested in January 2019.	On 6 July 2022, Joël Bourgeon was sentenced to 20 years in prison for murder. He appealed but committed suicide in prison before the second trial.
1987	Seine-Saint-Denis, Seine-et-Marne	Murder of Virginie Delmas	On 5 May 1987 in Neuilly-sur-Marne, Virginie Delmas, 10 years old, was kidnapped. Her body was found naked 5 months later in an orchard.	Investigation ongoing; crime unsolved as of 2025.
1987	Hauts-de-Seine	Murder of Hemma Davy-Greedharry	Kidnapping of 10-year-old Hemma Davy-Greedharry, 10 years old, in Malakoff on 30 May 1987.	Her burned body was in Châtillon the same day. Case not solved as of 2026.
1987	Seine-et-Marne	Murder of Perrine Vigneron	Abduction of 7-year-old Perrine Vigneron, in Bouleurs, on 3 June 1987.	His body was found in a rapeseed field in Chelles on 27 June 1987. Case not solved as of 2026.
1987	Hérault	Yves Dandonneau case	Joël Hipeau was murdered in a staged car accident on 6 June 1987 by Yves Dandonneau to receive his own life insurance.	
1987	Essonne	Murder of Sabine Dumont	Abduction of 9-year-old Sabine Dumont in Bièvres on 27 June 1987.	She was found dead, naked, raped in Vauhallan on 28 June 1987. Case not solved as of 2026.
1987	Isère	Disappearance of Charazed Bendouiou	Disappearance of 10-year-old Charazed Bendouiou on 8 July 1987 in the Champ-Fleuri district in Bourgoin-Jallieu.	
1987	Gard	Murder of Évelyne Boucher	Viol et meurtre d’Évelyne Boucher, 16 ans, le 8 December 1987 à Villeneuve-les-Avignon par Robert Greiner, un pompier volontaire.	L'ADN de Greiner est enregistré en 2003 à la suite d'une bagarre ; il sera arrêté trois ans plus tard. Greiner est condamné à perpétuité en 2008.
1987–2003	Yonne, Marne, Ardennes, Loire-Atlantique, Seine-et-Marne	Michel Fourniret	Kidnappings, rapes and murders of at least seven young girls by Michel Fourniret and his wife Monique Olivier from 11 December 1987 to 5 May 2001 in France and Belgium. They were convicted in 2008. In 2020 they were convicted of the murder of 9-year-old Estelle Mouzin on 3 January 2003 in Guermantes.	Monique Olivier claims that it was her ex-husband Michel Fourniret, a serial killer sentenced to life imprisonment, who killed Estelle Mouzin on 24 January 2020, 17 years after her death in 2003.
1987–2002	Gironde, Landes	Roland Cazaux	Series of rapes committed by Roland Cazaux in Arcachon and Hossegor.	"The Cat"
1988–2018	Nord	Dino Scala	Serial rapist Dino Scala was indicted on 27 February 2018, 30 years after his first crimes	Le « violeur de la Sambre » est condamné à 20 ans de réclusion criminelle.
1988	Paris	Assassination of Dulcie September	Dulcie September, ANCrepresentative in France, was assassinated on 29 March 1988 on the landing of the ANC offices on the 4th floor of 28 Rue des Petites-Écuries. Five bullets fired at close range from a 22 caliber rifle equipped with a silencer.	Case not solved as of 2026.
1988	Nouvelle-Calédonie	Ouvéa cave hostage taking	This hostage-taking, between 22 April and 4 May 1989, cost the lives of twenty-one people and injured four.	Most of the attackers were killed by the security forces, including Alphonse Dianou, a member of the FLNKS.
1988	Alpes-de-Haute-Provence	Murder of Celine Jourdan	Murder and rape of 7-year-old Céline Jourdan on 26 July 1988 in La Motte-du-Caire by Didier Gentil.	Richard Roman, also accused, was acquitted after several years of pre-trial detention.
1988	Isère	Murder of Nathalie Boyer	Abduction of Nathalie Boyer, 15, in Villefontaineon 3 August 1988.	She was found on 4 August 1988 with her throat slit on a path in Saint-Quentin-Fallavier.
1988	Essonne	Murders of Gilles Naudet and Anne-Sophie Vandamme	Murders of Gilles Naudet and Anne-Sophie Vandamme, a young 25-year-old couple and their dog in the Forest of Fontainebleau on 31 October 1988.	
1988	Indre-et-Loire	Murder of Françoise Gendron	Murder and dismemberment of Françoise Gendron by her friend Sylvie Reviriego, the 12 December 1988 in Tours.	
1988–1990	Meurthe-et-Moselle	Rodica Negroiu	Rodica Negroiu, a nursing assistant of Romanian origin, convicted of the poisoning murders on 16 February 1988 in Custinesof her 68-year-old husband Gérard Helluy. Later the death of, and the murder of 82-year-old Raymond Jactel on 14 December 1990 in Vandœuvre-lès-Nancy.	She is suspected of the suspicious death of Herman Goldstein, the "poisoner of Maxéville."
1989–2017	Paris, Loire-Atlantique, Indre-et-Loire, Morbihan, Finistère, Charente-Maritime, Orne, Nord	Joël Le Scouarnec	Dr. Joël Le Scouarnec, a specialist in digestive surgery, was under investigation in May 2017 following several accusations of rape and sexual assault against several people, including a number of children. The known number of victims is 349.	
1989	Isère	Murder of Fabrice Ladoux	Kidnapping of 12-year-old Fabrice Ladoux in Grenoble on 13 January 1989.	His body was found in Quaix-en-Chartreuse on 16 January 1989.
1989	Bouches-du-Rhône	Henri Pacchioni case	Henri Pacchioni, professional diver, was sentenced in 1996 for the disappearance of his 32-year-old partner Michèle Moriamé who went missing on 1 April 1989.	
1989	Nouvelle-Calédonie	Ouvéa cave hostage taking	Two FLNKS leaders, Jean-Marie Tjibaou, 53, a politician, and Yeiwéné Yeiwéné, his right-hand man, were attending the ceremony to lift the mourning for the 19 militants killed a year earlier during the assault on the Ouvéa cave when they were assassinated by Djubelly Wea on 4 May 1989.	Djubelly Wea was immediately shot dead by Tjibaou's personal bodyguard.
1989	Haute-Garonne	Francazal murders	Rape and murder of three women and murder of a gamekeeper by four deserting paratroopers from the military logistics camp located near the Air Base 101 Toulouse from May to July 1989.	
1989	Nord	Ida Beaussart case	Assassination of Jean-Claude Beaussart, shot dead by his 17-year-old daughter Ida, on 18 July 1989 in Salomé.	
1989–1997	Haute-Garonne, Ariège, Paris	Patrice Alègre	Series of murders and rapes committed by Patrice Alègre in Toulouse, Verdun and Paris.	
1989	Paris	Murder of Sirima	Murder of Sirima Wiratunga, a 25-year-old French-British singer on 7 December 1989 by her companion Kahatra Sasorith.	He was sentenced to 9 years in prison.
1989–1999	Vendée, Loire-Atlantique	Didier Tallineau	Murder of his 23-year-old partner Catherine Charuau, in August 1989 in Oulmes by Didier Tallineau and murder of Carole Le Yondre, a 20-year-old nursing student, in Châteaubriant on 19 July 1999, in the cellar of his bar.	
1989–2001	Eure	Marcel Lechien case	3 rapes and 36 sexual assaults on his students by Marcel Lechien, a first grade teacher in Cormeilles.	The alert had first been given in 1996.
1990	Paris	Disappearance of Alain Kan	Disappearance of Alain Kan, the French singer in the night of 14 April 1990.	He was officially declared dead in the early 2000s, although his body was never found.
1990	Vaucluse	Grave desecration at a Jewish cemetery in Carpentras	Desecration of Jewish graves in the Carpentrascemetery on the night of 8 to 9 May 1990.	3 former members of the French and European Nationalist Party (PFNE), confessed on 2 August 1996.
1990	Yvelines	Murder of Joseph Doucé	Kidnapping and murder of Pastor Joseph Doucé, a defender of sexual minorities, including pedophiles, in July 1990.	
1990	Isère	Murder of Rachid Bouzian	Kidnapping, rape and murder of 8-year-old Rachid Bouzian on 3 August 1990 in Échirolles by Karim Katefi.	His body was discovered in a garage on 5 August 1990.
1990–1991	Val-de-Marne, Paris, Essonne	Rémy Roy	The murders of two homosexuals in Draveil and Champigny-sur-Marne and the murder of another in Paris. Attempted murder of another man on 8 October 1991 in Villeneuve-Saint-Georges by Rémy Roy.	The "minitel killer" contacted and arranged to meet his victims via the homosexual Minitel rose to kill them under sadomasochistic circumstances.
1990–2003	Essonne, Calvados, Marne, Eure, Ardennes, Côte-d'Or, Saône-et-Loire, Drôme	Jean-Luc Blanche	Kidnapping and rape of three women in Caen in 1990 by Jean-Luc Blanche. A new series of assaults, kidnappings, sequestrations, and rapes followed in 2003 after he was released from prison.	"The Rape Backpacker"

== 1991–1999 ==
Year	Department	Case	Summary	Convictions and comments
1991	Alpes-Maritimes	Jean-Louis Turquin case	On 21 March 1991, 8-year-old Charles-Édouard Turquin disappeared in Nice; his body was never found.	Jean-Louis Turquin was sentenced on 21 March 1997, to 20 years of criminal imprisonment by the Alpes-Maritimes Assize Court. Released on 18 July 2006, after 10 years in prison. He was murdered on 7 January 2017, on Saint-Martin in the Caribbean (case currently unsolved).
1991–1996	Isère	Georges Pouille	On 17 April 1991 in Voreppe Georges Pouille killed Sara Siad. On 24 November 1996, he killed 10-year-old Saïda Berch. The two girls were strangled.	Georges Pouille was sentenced on 11 March 2016 to 30 years of criminal imprisonment by the Isère Assize Court.
1991	Bouches-du-Rhône	Rida Daalouche	On 29 May 1991, Abdelali Gasmi, a 26-year-old heroin dealer, had his throat slit in a bar in Marseille.	Rida Daalouche was sentenced on 12 April 1994, to 14 years of criminal imprisonment by the Bouches-du-Rhône Assize Court. Acquitted and released on 8 May 1999, after 5 years in prison.
1991	Alpes-Maritimes	Omar Raddad Affair	On 24 June 1991, Ghislaine Marchal, a financially well-off widow, was found dead in the cellar of her villa in Mougins.	Omar Raddad was sentenced on 2 February 1994, to 18 years of criminal imprisonment by the Alpes-Maritimes Assize Court. He was pardoned and released on 4 September 1998, after seven years in prison. Subsequently, two requests for review, based on prior DNA tests, were filed and rejected.
1991–1992	Meurthe-et-Moselle	Vincenzo Aiutino	Between 6 August 1991 to 25 February 1992, Vincenzo Aiutino murdered three young women in Longwy.	Vincenzo Aiutino was sentenced on 6 March 1998 to life imprisonment with a security period of 18 years by the Meurthe-et-Moselle Assize Court.
1991	Pyrénées-Orientales	Christian Van Geloven case	On 19 October 1991, Christian Van Geloven committed the kidnapping, robbery, rape and murder of two 10-year-old cousins Muriel Sanchez and Ingrid Van de Portaeleet in Elne.	Christian Van Geloven was sentenced on 25 March 1994, to life imprisonment with a 30-year security period by the Pyrénées-Orientales Assize Court. He died in prison on 6 August 2011, after 19 years in detention.
1991	Nièvre	Murder of Marie-Claire Bégo	On 25 October 1991, Marie-Claire Bégo, 37, disappeared after getting off her bus in Béard (58160) where she had left her car.	On 27 October 1991, her body was found tied up and partially charred at the Imphy slag heap on the banks of the Loire. She had been raped and then strangled. Investigation ongoing; crime unsolved as of 2025.
1991	Puy-de-Dôme	Bernard Rouhalde case	On 26 November 1991, 43-year-old Françoise Ferreyrolles, was executed by a mafia commando in Clermont-Ferrand, ordered by her husband Bernard Rouhalde, with the complicity of Christiane Seguin, his lover.	Christiane Séguin was sentenced on 27 May 1998 to 16 years of criminal imprisonment by the Puy-de-Dôme Assize Court.
1991	Hauts-de-Seine	Disappearance of Jérôme Cantet	On 14 December 1991, ten-year-old Jérôme Cantet disappeared after going to buy a toy at the La Défense Shopping Center in Courbevoie. On the same day the Olympic flame of the Albertville Winter Olympics passed through the neighborhood square. His skateboard was found in a parking lot, but the boy was never found.	Disappearance unsolved as of 2025.
1992	Seine-Maritime	Murder of Sylviane Kaas	On 5 April 1992 in Anneville-Ambourville, 40-year-old Sylviane Kaas, was killed at home while her children and husband were at the cinema.	Crime unsolved as of 2025.
1992–2002	Oise, Loire, Pas-de-Calais	Jacquy Haddouche	From 30 November 1992 to 13 September 2002 in Beauvais and Saint-Étienne, murder of three men.	Jacquy Haddouche was sentenced on 7 May 2008, to life imprisonment with a 22-year security period by the Oise Assize Court. He died in prison on 23 October 2010, after eight years in detention.
1993	Isère	Marinescu murders	On 7 January 1993, gendarmes discovered the lifeless bodies of Michèle Marinescu, 42, and her daughter Christine, 13, in their house in the commune of Sassenage.	Her husband, Marian Marinescu, is suspected of brutally killing his wife and daughter, but he maintains his innocence and claims he was 2,000 km from the crime scene.
1993	Ain, Jura	Jean-Claude Romand	On 9 January 1993, in Prévessin-Moëns, Jean-Claude Romand killed his wife and two children, aged seven and five. He went on to kill his parents on 10 January 1993.	Jean-Claude Romand was sentenced on 2 July 1996, to life imprisonment with a 22-year security period by the Ain Assize Court. He was released on 28 June 2019, after 26 years in prison.
1993–2001	Hérault, Aude	Albert Foulcher	On 21 January 1993 in Pailhès, revenge murder of André Meffray, 64 years old. Later repeated the offense on 8 January 2001, killed police officers Hervé Prior, 40, Patrick Rigaud, 45, Pascal Herrero, 45, and Maurice Michaud, 52, in Narbonne.	The perpetrator, Albert Foulcher, committed suicide on 17 January 2001.
1993	Aube	Pierre Dubois case	On 21 April 1993, Denise Descaves a college principal was murdered by deputy principal Pierre Dubois in Troyes.	Pierre Dubois was sentenced to 20 years of criminal imprisonment on 9 June 2000, by the Aube Assize Court. He was released in 2009 after 12 years in prison.
1993	Haute-Savoie	Murder of Jessica Blanc	On 25 July 1993, Michel Sydor, abducted 7-year-old Jessica Blanc from the village fair at Vacheresse. A few hours later, her body was found at Sydor's home 15 km away. The girl had been raped and then killed. Michel Sydor had already been convicted of the murder of a prostitute around 1950 and his wife in 1961.	Michel Sydor was sentenced on 15 June 1995 by the Haute-Savoie Assize Court to life imprisonment. He died in prison on 1 November 2014 of natural causes.
1993	Savoie, Var	Joseph Messina	On 10 September 1993, at Mont Granier, murder of 27-year-old Thierry Garbolino was murdered at Mont Granier. On 12 September 1993, 30-year-old Magali Ferrand was murdered at Brignoles.	Joseph Messina was sentenced on 13 October 1995, to life imprisonment, with an 18-year security sentence, by the Savoie Assize Court. He escaped in March 2019 after 25 years in prison. He was sentenced to an additional 3 years of imprisonment in April 2019.
1993–1995	Paris	Patrick Trémeau	Patrick Trémeau committed the rape and assault of thirteen women in underground car parks in Paris between April 1993 and 29 March 1995.	Patrick Trémeau was sentenced in October 1998 to 16 years of criminal imprisonment with an 8-year security period by the Paris Assize Court. He was released on 7 May 2005 after 10 years in prison but reoffended within months and was returned to prison.
1993	Hauts-de-Seine	Neuilly kindergarten hostage crisis	On 13 May 1993, a hostage-taking in a nursery school by a man identifying himself as "Human Bomb" in Neuilly-sur-Seine.	Erick Schmitt, the perpetrator, was killed by law enforcement on 15 May 1993.
1993	Paris	Christian Didier	On 8 June 1993, the assassination of the former Vichy police chief René Bousquet in Paris.	Christian Didier was sentenced in November 1995 to 10 years of criminal imprisonment by the Paris Assize Court. He was released on 24 February 2000 after 6 years of detention.
1993	Var	Murder of Barbara Coll	On 21 August 1993, in Saint-Tropez, Barbara Coll, a 29-year-old British woman, was found dead, naked, her clothes folded next to her, near a villa.	Crime unsolved as of 2025.
1993–1994	Val-de-Marne, Hauts-de-Seine	Claude Lastennet	Between 24 August 1993 and 8 January 1994, Claude Lastennet murdered five elderly ladies in Chevilly-Larue, Thiais, Boulogne-Billancourt et Bourg-la-Reine.	Claude Lastennet was sentenced on 22 October 1997 to life imprisonment with a security period of 18 years by the Val-de-Marne Assize Court.
1993–2004	Gironde, Oise, Charente	Raoul Becquerel	Between 1993 and 29 September 2004, a series of kidnappings, sequestrations and rapes occurred in Bordeaux, Crépy-en-Valois, Angoulême and Senlis.	Raoul Becquerel was sentenced on 12 December 2004, to 18 years of criminal imprisonment with a 12-year security period by the Gironde Assize Court.
1994	Var	Assassination of Yann Piat	On 25 February 1994, Yann Piat, a former UDF Member of Parliament Yann Piat was assassinated by a mafia commando in Hyères.	Gérard Finale was sentenced to life imprisonment on 16 June 1994, and Lucien Ferri to life imprisonment by the Var Assize Court. Gérard Finale died in prison on 10 May 2010, after 16 years in prison. Lucien Ferri was released in 2010 after 16 years in prison.
1994	Seine-Maritime	Poisoned Josacine case	On 11 June 1994 in Gruchet-le-Valasse, nine-year-old Émilie Tanay, died following cyanide poisoning in the care of Jean-Michel and Sylvie Tocqueville.	ean-Marc Deperrois was sentenced on 26 May 1997, to 20 years of criminal imprisonment by the Seine-Maritime Assize Court. He was released on 8 June 2006, after 12 years in prison.
1994	Val-d'Oise	Pierre Lorcy	In June 1994, 88-year-old Gaston Moysset was murdered at his home in Bezons.	Pierre Lorcy was sentenced to 10 years of criminal imprisonment by the Val d'Oise Assize Court on 22 June 2001. He was released in 2004 after five years in prison.
1994	Sarthe	Leprince family murders	On 5 September 1994, Christian Leprince, his wife Brigitte and two of their daughters, aged ten and six, were murdered in Thorigné.	Dany Leprince was sentenced on 11 December 1997, to life imprisonment with a 22-year security period by the Sarthe Assize Court. He was released on 8 July 2010, after 15 years in prison.
1994	Finistère	Murder of Marie-Michèle Calvez	On 22 September 1994, in Penmarch, Marie-Michèle Calvez's car was found burnt out with the woman's body tied up in the trunk.	The family offered a reward to anyone who can provide any information that can help solve the crime. Crime unsolved as of 2025.
1994	Paris	Rey-Maupin affair	On 4 October 1994 in Paris, a murderous attack on a student couple, Florence Rey and Audry Maupin, cost the lives of three police officers and a taxi driver.	Florence Rey was sentenced to 20 years of criminal imprisonment by the Paris Assize Court on 30 September 1998. She was released on 2 May 2009 after 15 years in prison.
1994	Bouches-du-Rhône	Air France Flight 8969	On 26 December 1994, in Marignane, members of the GIA hijacked a plane, followed by a hostage-taking in which three passengers were killed.	The perpetrators, Abdul Yahia, Mustafa Chekienne, Makhlouf Benguetaff and Salim Layadi, were killed by the security forces.
1994–1995	Ain	Sarrasin-Doyonnas affair	On 4 July 1994, in Montagnat a mechanic Gilles Doyonnas, was murdered by his wife Danielle and her lover Patrick Sarrasin. They repeated the crime on 13 October 1995, in Bourg-en-Bresse, killing Sébastien Faisant, a 25-year-old student.	On 30 November 1999, Patrick Sarrasin was sentenced to life imprisonment, Danielle Doyonnas to 30 years of criminal imprisonment by the Ain Assize Court.
1994–2006	Haut-Rhin, Bas-Rhin	Yvan Keller	From 1994 to 2006 in Alsace, Yvan Keller killed at least forty elderly women, suffocating them to make them look like natural deaths.	Yvan Keller committed suicide before his trial on 22 September 2006.
1995	Yvelines	Louveciennes massacre	On 26 February 1995, Alexi Polevoi murdered six members of his family in Louveciennes.	Alexi Polevoi was sentenced to 8 years of criminal imprisonment by the Yvelines Assize Court on 14 March 1998. He was released on 8 July 2000 after 5 years in prison.
1995	Bas-Rhin	Murder of Carole Prin	On 16 May 1995, 37-year-old pregnant woman Carole Prin was murdered in Strasbourg by her companion, Roland Moog.	Roland Moog was sentenced on 28 November 2001 to 25 years of criminal imprisonment with a 15-year security period by the Bas-Rhin Assize Court. He was released in 2015.
1995	Rhône	Saint-Andéol massacre	On 30 May 1995, in Saint-Andéol-le-Château, murder of the Bébien couple and two of their children.	In October 1999, Éric Bruyas was sentenced to life imprisonment with a 22-year security period by the Rhône Assize Court. Detained since 16 June 1995, he was released in October 2021 and died in 2022.
1995	Paris, Rhône	1995 France bombings	Between 11 July 1995 and 17 October 1995, a series of attacks killed 8 people in Paris and Villeurbanne.	The perpetrator, Khaled Kelkal, was killed by law enforcement on 29 September 1995.
1995	Essonne	Murder of Gilles Andruet	On 22 August 1995, Gilles Andruet, a 38-year-old chess champion was murdered in Saulx-les-Chartreux.	Crime unsolved as of 2025.
1995	Var	Cuers massacre	On 23 September 1995, 16-year-old Éric Borel murdered three members of his family were murdered in Solliès-Pont. The next day he carried out a massacre of twelve people in the village of Cuers.	Eric Borel committed suicide on 24 September 1995.
1995	Pyrénées-Orientales	Disappearance of Tatiana Andújar	On 24 September 1995, 17-year-old Tatiana Andújar, disappeared in the station area of Perpignan. The case was linked to the Gare de Perpignan murders.	Case unsolved as of 2025.
1996	Nord	Gang de Roubaix	From 27 January 1996 to 29 March 1996 in the Nord department, a series of robberies, three murders and an attempted attack.	Omar Zemmiri was sentenced on 18 October 2001 to 28 years of criminal imprisonment, Hocine Bendaoui to 20 years of criminal imprisonment by the Nord Assize Court. Omar Zemmiri was released in 2013 after 16 years of detention, Hocine Bendaoui was released in 2011 after 15 years of detention.
1996–2000	Paris	Brumark-Bourgeois affair	An international prostitution ring involving influential Middle Eastern clients and prominent figures in the business and show business worlds. Producers Alain Sarde, Christophe Lambert and Robert De Niro are implicated.	The judicial aspect resulted in the conviction of Jean-Pierre Bourgeois and Annicka Brumark for pimping.
1996	Haut-Rhin	Charles and Christophe Cretello case	On 2 April 1996, Angela and Alain Hay were murdered by father and son Charles and Christophe Cretello in Rosenau.	Charles Cretello was sentenced in June 2003 to life imprisonment with a 22-year security period, while Christophe Cretello was sentenced to 20 years' imprisonment by the Haut-Rhin Assize Court.
1996–1997	Seine-Maritime	Jean-Yves Morel case	On 5 April 1996 in La Frénaye, Jean-Yves Morel killed his sister-in-law Marylène Rousset. On 26 June 1997 he murdered Élisabeth Griffin, a chemistry student intern at the company where he worked.	Jean-Yves Morel was sentenced to life imprisonment in February 2000 by the Seine-Maritime Assize Court.
1996	Yvelines	Murder of Willy Pomonti	On 16 April 1996, 69-year-old Willy Pomonti was tortured and murdered at his home in La Celle-Saint-Cloud during a burglary.	Michel Ambras was sentenced on 13 September 2010, to 25 years of criminal imprisonment with a 16-year security period by the Yvelines Assize Court. He died in prison in 2017 or 2018.
1996	Paris	Mamadou Traoré	From 23 April 1996 to 30 October 1996, Mamadou Traoré committed attacks on six women, two of whom were fatal, in Paris.	Mamadou Traoré was sentenced on 15 February 2000 to life imprisonment with a 22-year security period by the Paris Assize Court.
1996	Ille-et-Vilaine	Francisco Arce Montes	On 18 July 1996, a British schoolgirl, Caroline Dickinson, was raped and murdered in a youth hostel in Pleine-Fougères by Francisco Montes, a Spanish truck driver.	Francisco Montes was sentenced on 14 June 2004 to 30 years of criminal imprisonment with a 20-year security period by the Ille et Vilaine Assize Court.
1996	Isère	Disappearance of Léo Balley	On 19 July 1996, 6-year-old Léo Balley disappeared in Taillefer. His body was never found.	Linked with the Disparus de l'Isère. Case unsolved as of 2025.
1996	Paris	1996 Paris RER bombing	On 3 December 1996, in Paris, four people were killed and 91 others were injured in a terrorist attack on the Réseau Express Régional.	Case unsolved as of 2025.
1996	Lot-et-Garonne	Disappearance of Marion Wagon	On 14 November 1996, Marion Wagon, a 10-year-old schoolgirl, disappeared a few hundred metres from her home in Agen.	Case unsolved as of 2025.
1996	Saône-et-Loire	Murder of Christelle Blétry	On 27 December 1996, 20-year-old Christelle Blétry was found dead in Blanzy with 123 stab wounds by farm worker Pascal Jardin.	Pascal Jardin was sentenced on 2 February 2017 to life imprisonment with a 20-year security period by the Saône-et-Loire Assize Court.
1997	Aisne	Jean-Baptiste Hennequin	On 20 January 1997, the murder of the couple of directors and the receptionist of the Grand Hotel in Saint-Quentin by Jean-Baptiste Hennequin.	Jean-Baptiste Hennequin was sentenced in June 1999 to life imprisonment with a 22-year security period by the Aisne Assize Court.
1997	Côte-d'Or	Disappearance of Virginie Bluzet	On 7 February 1997, 21-year-old Virginie Bluzet disappeared in Beaune. One of the A6 disappearances.	Case unsolved as of 2025.
1997	Pas-de-Calais	Jourdain brothers	On 11 February 1997, four young girls were kidnapped, raped and held captive, followed by the murder of Jean-Michel and Jean-Louis Jourdain while they were on their way to the carnival in Le Portel.	Jean-Michel Jourdain was sentenced on 27 October 2000 to life imprisonment with a security period of 22 years, Jean-Louis Jourdain to life imprisonment with a security period of 20 years by the Pas-de-Calais Assize Court. Jean-Louis Jourdain died in detention on 9 March 2019 after 21 years in detention.
1997–1998	Yvelines	Christine Malèvre	From February 1997 to May 1998, in Mantes-la-Jolie, murder of six patients by Christine Malèvre, a hospital nurse.	Christine Malèvre was sentenced to 12 years of criminal imprisonment by the Yvelines Assize Court on 31 January 2003. She was released in August 2007 after four years in prison.
1997	Savoie	Disappearance of Cécile Vallin	On 8 June 1997, 17-year-old Cécile Vallin disappeared in Saint-Jean-de-Maurienne.	Case unsolved as of 2025.
1997	Yvelines	Atouillant affair	On 14 October 1997, the murder of an infant by a childminder who was looking after him in Saint-Rémy-lès-Chevreuse.	Marie-Christine Atouillant was sentenced on 20 October 2004 to 12 years of criminal imprisonment by the Yvelines Assize Court.
1997–1999	Essonne, Aveyron	Alfredo Stranieri	Italian serial killer Alfredo Stranieri committed four murders between November 1997 and March 1999 in Viry-Châtillon and Bez-de-Naussac. The victims were killed during meetings set up through classified ads.	Alfredo Stranieri is sentenced on 28 February 2003 to life imprisonment with a security period of 22 years by the Essonne Assize Court.
1997	Tarn-et-Garonne	Altobella Cappelleri case	In 1997 in Aucamville, Georges Hourdin was kidnapped, tortured and killed by Altobella Cappelleri in an inn.	Altobella Cappelleri est condamné en 2005 à 20 ans de réclusion criminelle par les assises du Tarn-et-Garonne. Elle meurt en prison en 2015
1998	Corse-du-Sud	Assassination of Claude Érignac	On 6 February 1998 in Ajaccio, assassination of the prefect of Corsica, Claude Érignac, who was shot dead by an armed commando.	Alain Ferrandi was sentenced to life imprisonment on 11 July 2003, and Pierre Alessandri to life imprisonment by the Paris Assize Court. Yvan Colonna was sentenced to life imprisonment with a 22-year security period by the Paris Assize Court on 13 December 2007. After he was attacked by a fellow inmate on 2 March 2022, Yvan Colonna died in Marseille on 21 March.
1998	Loiret	Murder of Jean-Paul Zawadzki	On 11 March 1998, Jean-Paul Zawadzki was murdered by his wife Nicole with the help of her lover, Doctor Michel Trouillard-Perrot in Sougy.	Nicole Zawadzki was sentenced to 28 years in prison on 20 June 2001, and Michel Trouillard-Perrot to 20 years in prison by the Loiret Assize Court. Michel Trouillard-Perrot was released in December 2007 after 9 years in prison.
1998	Bouches-du-Rhône	Murder of Sylvain Alloard	On 23 March 1998, Sylvain Alloard, 31, was shot dead in front of his home in Marseille.	Case unsolved as of 2025.
1999	Ain, Rhône	Jamila Belkacem affair	On 23 February 1999 in Bourg-en-Bresse, Jacques Brunet was murdered by her lover by Jamila Belkacem by poisoning him.	Jamila Belkacem was sentenced on 4 February 2006 to life imprisonment with a security period of 22 years by the Loire Assize Court.
1999	Meurthe-et-Moselle	Nadir Sedrati	Between 14 May 1999 to 19 July 1999, in Nancy, three men were murdered and dismembered before being thrown into a canal. Two other alleged murders, committed in May 1982 and October 1994, were also attributed to Sedrati, but without a confession, he was acquitted in 1985 and 1998.	Nadir Sedrati was sentenced on 26 May 2003 to life imprisonment with a 22-year security period by the Metz Assize Court.
1999	Calvados	Godard family disappearance	On 3 September 1999, the doctor Yves Godard, his wife and two children disappeared at sea.	The case was closed on 14 September 2012
1999	Haute-Vienne, Somme, Pas-de-Calais	Sid Ahmed Rezala	From 13 October 1999 to 14 December 1999 in Chabenet, Amiens and Calais, three women aged 20 to 36 were murdered.	The perpetrator, Sid Ahmed Rezala, committed suicide on 28 June 2000.
1999	Tarn	Murder of Evelyn Wilkinson-Lund	On 29 December 1999, Evelyn Lund-Wilkinson disappeared in Rayssac.	Her second husband Robert Lund was sentenced to 12 years in prison by the Tarn Assize Court in October 2007. He was released on 14 September 2013 after nine years in prison.
1999	Charente-Maritime	Véronique Courjault	In 1999 in Villeneuve-la-Comtesse, murder of a newborn by his mother Véronique Courjault, and two other murders of newborns committed in South Korea.	Véronique Courjault was sentenced to 8 years of criminal imprisonment by the Indre-et-Loire Assize Court on 18 June 2009. She was released on 17 May 2010 after 11 months in detention.

== Bibliography ==
- Armand Fouquier, Causes célèbres de tous les peuples, Paris, Lebrun, 1858–1867. Livraisons 1–25, p. mult. Livraisons 26–50, p. mult. Livraisons 51–75, p. mult. Livraisons 76–100, p. mult. Livraisons 101–114, p. mult. Livraisons 115–139, p. mult. Affaires Armand et La Pommerais (« Les procès du jour », 1864), et de Épisode des journées de juin 1848 à l'affaire Castaing (No. 249), p. mult. En ligne sur Gallica.

== See also ==
- List of major crimes in France (2000–present)
- List of major crimes in Ireland
- List of major crimes in Singapore (2020–present)
- List of major crimes in the United Kingdom
