= Janet Marshall =

Janet Marshall may refer to:

== People with the name ==
- Janet Marshall, fictional character from Halloween
- Janet Marshall Stevenson, American writer and social activist
- Murder of Janet Marshall

== See also ==
- Jane Marshall
- Ghislaine Maxwell, used the name as a pseudonym
