= Rodica Negroiu =

Romanian murderer

- Born: 1940 (age 85–86); Romania
- Other name: "The Poisoner of Maxéville"
- Conviction: Murder
- Penalty: 20 years imprisonment

Details
- Victims: 2–3
- Span of crimes: 1985–2004
- Country: France, possibly Romania
- State: Meurthe-et-Moselle

Rodica Negroiu (born 1940), also known as The Poisoner of Maxéville, is a Romanian murderer who was initially captured on 14 December 1990 for the death of 82-year-old retired French soldier Raymond Jactel in Vandœuvre-lès-Nancy, Meurthe-et-Moselle. The subsequent investigation carried out brought to light a second victim: Negroiu's second husband, in whose body was found the same toxic substance as in Jactel: digoxin. These two murders echoed with the Romanian community in Tel Aviv, Israel, which brought to attention the existence of the first husband, Herman Goldstein, who also died under suspicious circumstances back in Romania.

== Murder of Raymond Jactel ==
On 14 December 1990, the retired soldier died at 8:30 PM at Nancy Hospital of what appeared to be a heart attack, shortly after calling for help. It was revealed that Jactel had taken out a life insurance with Rodica Negroiu and that he had converted his savings into Treasury Bills, worth 700,000 francs, which disappeared on the day of his death. The case resembled that of Simone Weber, who had also used poison and had a similar motive: money.

== Investigations ==
=== Raymond Jactel ===
Before meeting Rodica, Jactel had taken under his wing the young Claude, a public assistant's child, intending to be his legatee. After meeting Negroiu, however, their relationship began to disintegrate, as Raymond no longer wanted Claude to inherit the house. Despite this, he confided to him the place where he hid the Treasury Bills and their serial numbers.

A few days after Jactel's death, a person came to the post to exchange three Treasury Bills. When faced with the request of the counter to present his identity document, the man left without insisting. Alerted to this incident, the police made the link with the bills being lost the day Raymond Jactel died. Later, he was identified as Roger, Rodica Negroiu's current companion, by the postman, who formally identified him.

Authorities discovered that the life insurance between Jactel and Negroiu was signed just two months before the retiree's death. The terms of the contract specified a monthly pension of 2,000 francs to be paid to Jactel, moreover, Negroiu had to take care of him until his final days.

The neighbourhood survey showed that she had been dealing with him for the last two years, and that the pensioner was reputed to be authoritarian and possibly had a hold on Rodica.

Ten days after his burial, Raymond Jactel's body was exhumed and analyses were carried out on his viscera by the Medical Institute of Strasbourg. The analyses revealed the presence of digoxin (digitalis) and phenobarbital (an antiepileptic drug), which had not been prescribed by the doctor. On the other hand, on 29 August 1990, six months before the pensioner's death, Negroiu was prescribed these two substances by a pharmacy in Nancy.

=== Gérard Helluy ===
The investigation showed that after leaving her native Romania and arriving in France, Rodica Negroiu married Gérard Helluy, 68, who died two years after their wedding, on 7 December 1985 in Nancy.

When interviewed, Helluy's sisters described Rodica as a profiteer. They explained that, for example, soon after the marriage Gérard offered an apartment to her son. Moreover, he was forced to give her a mink coat which cost him three months' pension, or about 14,500 francs. Subsequently, in lack of liquidity, Gérard asked Rodica to return it to him for the seller, with her admitting to already selling it.

Following this incident, and accompanied by his sisters, Helluy went to the notary to file for divorce and cancel the life insurance he signed three days after the wedding. Following an inquiry by the Direction centrale des renseignements généraux, it was revealed that at the beginning of the marriage Gérard and Rodica did not even live under the same roof: he lived in Custines and she in Nancy. Negroiu's naturalization application was rejected twice for this very reason. Following these rejections, they began to live together, however, Jactel's sisters explained that they did not share the same room and that their brother locked the door at night with a chain, as he feared Rodica would attack him. The sisters said that in their presence, Gérard had a strong character when Rodica was absent, but when she was present he behaved like "a mop".

In this context, Gérard cancelled the divorce petition and signed a new life insurance policy.

On the day of the death of her husband Gérard, Rodica had just acquired French nationality and obtained the right to receive the money from the insurance policy in the event of her husband's death. Negroiu claimed that he died as a result of excessive drinking, which was mentioned as the cause of death by the doctor. However, the autopsy 4 years after his death determined that Helluy had traces of digoxin on his hair and on the liver. Indeed, the analysis of hair growth demonstrated a chronic consumption of digoxin by Helluy, spread over several months.

This feature was also found on hair samples taken from Jactel: his consumption of digoxin was also chronic, spread over several weeks.

=== Herman Goldstein ===
Following these revelations, Rodica Negroiu was charged with two murders and voluntarily imprisoned at the Charles III prison in Nancy. The similarities between this case and that of Simone Weber resonated with the Romanian community in Tel Aviv, Israel. Thus, by reading the press, Esther Goldstein, the sister of Negroiu's first husband, Herman Goldstein, discovered the two murders of which her ex-sister-in-law was accused. She contacted the judge in Nancy to inform him of the first marriage in 1982 with her brother, while Rodica and Herman were still living in Romania. At age 51, Goldstein died from a suspicious heart attack.

== Temporary release and liberty ==
During her temporary incarceration, Rodica Negroiu's lawyer claimed against expertise on the bodies of Jactel and Helluy. The analyses carried out by the Forensic Institute of Paris proved that there was the presence of phenobarbital on Jactel's body, but negative on both bodies regarding digoxin. The lawyer submitted a request for freedom for his client and obtained it against a deposit of 500,000 francs.

A third toxicological expertise was then ordered by the judge, with an expert from Lille. The results this time were positive and consistent with the first analysis. When asked about the fluctuation of results between the various analyses, the expert explained to the judge that the results depend on the amount of sampling evaluated and the methods. Despite these new results, the judge decided to keep Negroiu free for now.

== Back in custody ==
During her period of freedom, Rodica Negroiu lodged complaints against a number of actors in her case: X, Esther Goldstein, Raymond Jactel's neighbours, Claude, the Helluy family, the landowner at Nancy, the judge in charge of her case and the police officers who arrested her. Following these complaints, she was sentenced twice for slanderous and reincarcerated denunciation.

== Trial ==
The judge decided to prosecute Rodica only for the murders of Jactel and Helluy, with her defence being provided by Alain Behr and Gérard Michel.

The trial began on 21 June 1999, at the Assizes Court of Meurthe-et-Moselle, in Nancy. During the trial, Rodica's behaviour played against her; she was described as wanting absolute control of the trial, as well as being angry when contradicted. She also attacked, threatened and insulted the witnesses. The President of the Tribunal allowed the Helluy family's lawyer to say the truth, thus lowering the defendant's defences. Thus, she fell into a trap:

- Claude, the heir chosen by Raymond Jactel, finally admitted to having cashed the 700,000 francs on the day of death: he presented the serial numbers of the coupons. This revelation was likely to invalidate the motive of the defendant to murder Jactel, and thus lead to an acquittal. But Rodica made the mistake of exploding with anger when dealing with the thief. This strategy by Claude, although initially putting him in danger, resulted in him being the hero of the trial, the one that led Rodica to reveal her true greedy nature to the jury. Mad with rage, Negroiu pointed at him as being the person who stole "her" treasury bills.
- In addition, the other significant event of this trial was the presentation before the court of all the objects that were found at Negroiu's home during a search, all of which belonged to Raymond Jactel. She claimed, however, that each belonged to her because it supposedly came from Romania, which was false. Faced with this claim, without her noticing, the Civil Party lawyer slipped his own watch and asked Rodica to whom it belonged. Falling right into the trap, she responded that the watch belonged to her, presenting herself before the jury as both a greedy person and a liar.

At the end of the trial, in July 1999, the jury followed the requisitions of the Advocate General and sentenced Rodica Negroiu to 20 years imprisonment. At the time, no appeals did not exist, to the sentence was final.

A few years later, the Grand Tribunal of Nancy declared the marriage between Rodica Negroiu and Gérard Helluy null, stripping her of her French citizenship.

Negroiu was released from prison on 24 January 2015. She spent most of her time in solitary confinement, because of her tendency to revolt against the prison authorities.

== See also ==
- List of French serial killers

== Mediagraphy ==
=== TV documentaries ===
- "Rodica Negroiu, the Poisoner of Maxéville" 24 March 2013, on Enter the Accused with Frédérique Lantieri on France 2.
- "Rodica, the mortal inheritance" (second report) on Deadly Seductions; 28 March 2019 on NRJ 12.

=== Radio broadcasts ===
- "The Rodica Negroiu Affair", 19 January 2018, on the programme Hondelatte Tells on Europe 1.
