= Michel Sydor =

French serial killer (1929–2014)

- Born: Michel Sydor; 8 September 1929; Corbeil-Essonnes, France
- Died: 1 November 2014 (aged 85); Ensisheim, France
- Other names: "The Légionnaire" "The Monster" "The Farmer of Red Valley"
- Status: Deceased
- Conviction: Murder x3
- Penalty: 5 years penal labour (c. 1950); Life imprisonment (1964) commuted in 20 years' imprisonnement (1972); Life imprisonment with a possibility of parole after 30 years (1995)

Details
- Victims: 3+
- Span of crimes: c. 1950; 1961; 1993 (confirmed) c. 1950; 1950s – 1961; 1978 – 1993 (possible)
- Country: France
- Date apprehended: c. 1950 (first time); 23 Décember 1961 (second time); 26 July 1993 (final time)

Michel Sydor (September 8, 1929 – November 1, 2014) was a French serial killer and multi-recidivist killer.

Around 1950, Sydor killed a prostitute following a dispute. Sentenced to 5 years' hard labour, he was released after serving his sentence. In December 1961, he shot his wife dead when she wanted to leave him and then attempted to kill his father-in-law as well. Remanded in custody, he was then sentenced to life imprisonment in June 1964. Following a presidential pardon in 1972, his sentence was reduced to 20 years' imprisonment.

Released in 1978, he raped and killed Jessica Blanc, aged 7, on July 25, 1993 in Vacheresse (Haute-Savoie). Sydor was arrested the next day and remanded in custody. During this last case, he was nicknamed ‘the Legionnaire’ and ‘the Monster’. Sentenced in June 1995 to life imprisonment with a 30-year security period, Sydor died at the Ensisheim prison on November 1, 2014.

Blanc's murder outraged public opinion and led, along with the case of Patrick Tissier, to the creation of an incompressible life sentence in France.

== Biography ==
=== Youth and first murder ===
Sydor's childhood was marked by abuse and the Second World War. During his youth, he took pleasure in torturing and killing animals. Growing up in an unhealthy and unstable environment, he fell into marginality and wandered the streets. He invented the persona of a legionnaire and adopted it as his nickname (he was never a legionnaire, but he identified himself as one).

Sydor committed his first murder around 1950, killing a prostitute during a dispute with her. He was arrested and remanded in custody for murder. The Assize Court sentenced him to 5 years' hard labour, as the victim's status was illegal at the time.

After his release, Sydor settled in Pas-de-Calais, where he worked in farming and forestry. He met Gilberte Boudry, whom he married in January 1958. The couple settled in the village of Troisvaux, where they had two children. None of his in-laws or friends knew of his criminal record. Sydor worked as a miner's helper. In 1961, Sydor was dismissed after sending love letters to two young girls. Giberte decided to leave him and move in with her parents, along with their two children. Unemployed, he then decided to take revenge on his wife.

=== Second murder and detention ===
On the night of December 22, 1961, Sydor went to visit Gilberte's parents in Lens. Armed with a 9mm pistol, he shot his wife in the head and her father-in-law, Henri Boudry, in the chest. Wounded in the shoulder, he returned fire with his shotgun and shot Sydor, who was seriously injured. The young man fled, while Henri called the emergency services. When they arrived on the scene, they found Gilberte dead, but managed to treat Henri, who recovered from his injuries.

The day after the crime, Sydor was arrested and taken into custody. He denied the crime, before admitting that he had killed his wife because she was about to leave him. Once in custody, Sydor was charged with murder and attempted murder and remanded in custody. The press dubbed him the ‘Farmer of the Red Valley’, referring to a valley of blood.

From the 25th to 26 June 1964, Sydor appeared before the Pas-de-Calais Assize Court for the murder of his wife and the attempted murder of his father-in-law, where he faced the death penalty. Although he pleaded a crime of passion, the court refused him the 20-year prison sentence - which he could have received on the basis of the mitigating circumstances of a crime of passion - and sentenced him to life imprisonment. In 1972, Sydor was granted a presidential pardon reducing his sentence to 20 years' imprisonment.

=== Release and alleged respite ===
Sydor was released in 1978, after 17 years in prison, and moved to Haute-Savoie.

In 1981, his neighbours caught him torturing animals and denounced him. Sydor was charged with cruelty to animals, but was allowed to go free. In 1982, he was banned from living in the department of Haute-Savoie in France. Sydor then moved into a barracks in Neuvecelle, which was still in Haute-Savoie, despite being banned from the department. His neighbours identified him as a former legionnaire, although they had no idea that this was a pure fabrication.

On several occasions, Sydor tried to shoot his neighbours with a hunting rifle. The neighbours lodged two complaints against him in 1988 and 1989, but the investigations were dropped. In addition to the shootings, Sydor wrote indecent letters to young girls. Several complaints were also lodged against him in this regard, but nothing came of them. Because of his behaviour, Sydor was perceived by his neighbours as a ‘strange’ and ‘disturbed’ person. It is suspected that he may have committed other crimes between 1978 and 1993, but no evidence has been found to prove his guilt.

=== Third murder and repercussions for the law ===
On the night of July 25, 1993, Sydor abducted Jessica Blanc, aged 7, from a fair in the village of Vacheresse, between Evian and Morzine. He accosted her in the street and got her into his car. He then drove her to his home in Neuvecelle, where he proceeded to rape and kill her, eventually dumping her body in his garden. Jessica's parents, worried about her absence, reported her disappearance to the police station. Two young men also went to the station and claimed to have seen Blanc with a man before she disappeared. They also said that they had a bad feeling because they had never seen the man before in Vacheresse. Their description of the man and the model of his car identified the kidnapper, 64-year-old Sydor.

The police went to Sydor's house at around 1am. When questioned about the traces of blood on his hands, he said he had tripped. Convinced that Jessica might still be alive, the police searched Sydor's home and found the girl's body in his garden. Sydor was taken into custody and claimed to have met Jessica at the fair. According to his statement, the little girl told him that she was tired, but that her parents couldn't take her home. Sydor asked her if she had ever had sex with boys. According to Sydor, Blanc replied that she had done so twice with her cousin. Sydor then said that he had taken the girl to his house, but that he had killed her by accident.

On July 27, Sydor was charged with abduction, murder and rape of a minor under the age of 15, committed in a state of recidivism, and was remanded in custody. Following his indictment, a female lawyer was appointed to represent him. Sydor refused her services and asked to be defended by Maître Georges Rimondi. The case caused quite a stir in the press, because of Sydor's profile: a multi-recidivist killer, twice a murderer in the past. After this case and the case of Patrick Tissier, who was also a child killer and repeat offender, it led to the adoption of a new law: the introduction of an incompressible life sentence in France.

=== Trial and conviction ===
On June 14, 1995, Sydor went on trial before the Annecy Assize Court for the murder and rape of Jessica Blanc.

During the trial, Sydor remained calm, without showing any emotion, and discussed certain points of the procedure. He also accused the courts that by having set him free in 1978, they were made responsible for Jessica's murder. The atmosphere was heavy in the court since the accused was a multi-recidivist killer, twice convicted of murder, although the image of serial killer was not used until 1997. During the hearing, Blanc's father lost control and threw a chair at Sydor, who continued to deny his involvement. The police intervened and managed to stop the incident. Although aged 66, the accused was judged to be extremely dangerous and quite capable of re-offending, despite his age.

On June 15, Sydor was sentenced to life imprisonment, with a 30-year security period. He was transferred to the Ensisheim prison. Maître Rimondi later spoke of a man ‘of extreme rudeness’, who ‘could not find his place in society’. Rimondi, who then went on to become a notorious defender during the Flactif case and the Allinges tragedy, admits that "this case and this man marked me for life. I defended the worst of criminals for the worst of crimes", he admits, "but there had to be a court decision, a verdict so that justice could be done in full".

=== Release proceedings and death in custody ===
In 2012, Sydor and his lawyer, Yüksel Demir, invoked the Kouchner law and applied for his release on medical grounds. Blanc's family signed a petition for his continued detention. At 82 years old, Sydor suffered from heart disease and urinary incontinence. On July 11, the Colmar enforcement court rejected Sydor's request for release as experts considered that he was still dangerous and should remain behind bars. Sydor and Demir appealed against this decision. On December 11, the Court of Appeal again rejected his application for release, finding a high risk of re-offending despite his 83 years of age.

The court then went further on to explain in its recitals that the villagers had mobilised to prevent Mr Sydor's release, causing the mayor of the village to say he feared public disorder if Sydor were to be released. The court judge followed the conclusions of the medical and psychological expert reports and proposed a transfer to a suitable medical prison, which Sydor and his lawyer refused as unacceptable, considering this type of establishment to be a 'death trap'.

The Blanc victim's family lawyer, Frédéric Noetinger-Berlioz, welcomed the court's decision. He argued that "The Code of Criminal Procedure is clear: for such an application to have a chance of succeeding, there must be no risk of re-offending, and the condition of the convicted person must be incompatible with detention. In this case, neither condition was met".

Sydor died on 1 November 2014 at the Ensisheim prison, aged 85. Detained since July 1993, he could have applied for parole starting from July 2023.

== See also ==
- List of French serial killers
