= Murder of Janet Marshall =

1955 murder case in France

- Location: La Chaussée-Tirancourt, France
- Date: 28 August 1955 (CET)
- Attack type: Murder
- Weapon: Manual strangulation
- Deaths: 1
- Perpetrator: Robert Avril
- Motive: sexual motive

Janet Marshall (7 September 1925 – 28 August 1955) was a 29-year-old British schoolteacher who was murdered as a tourist in France in 1955, at La Chaussée-Tirancourt, by Robert Avril. He was a criminal who was arrested several times for assaults and rapes of young women.

== Background ==
Janet Marshall was born on 7 September 1925. She was a teacher for disabled children in Nottingham, England. She had one brother. She was a single brunette and had no children.

== Crime and investigation ==
On 28 August 1955, in the Somme, the half-naked body of Janet Marshall was found in a thicket on the border of the communes of La Chaussée-Tirancourt and Belloy-sur-Somme, at a place called "le chemin des Bruas". She had been cycling around France during her summer holidays. Barely three years after the Dominici affair, yet another murder of a British tourist made headlines across France and the United Kingdom. The initial searches yielded nothing. As the case was extremely sensitive, the investigation was entrusted to three commissioners: Divisional Commissioner Chabot, his deputy, Chief Commissioner Grassien, and Commissioner Léon Castellan of the Lille judicial police. The investigation was at a standstill and the British media mocked the inefficiency of the French police.

Commissioner Chabot puts the young inspector Henri Van Assche (1920-2018), on the case, the man whom the press would eventually dub the "Maigret of the North." The investigation was difficult, with contradictory testimonies. Van Assche had the idea of having a composite sketch drawn up based on testimonies about a sinister-looking stranger seen several times scouring the area on his bicycle. After a few months, Van Assche and his colleagues established the link between Janet Marshall's murder and a stolen moped found near the scene of the crime. Some time later, after an accident in the Paris region, a man fled, abandoning another stolen moped. Notably his left hand had three fingers missing, a detail given by several witnesses. He was Robert Avril, a 43-year-old vagrant, previously convicted of rape and released from prison the previous July. In his criminal record, the mug shot resembles the composite portrait. Arrested on 7 January 1956, he confessed on the fourth day of interrogation, saying that he had strangled the teacher who refused his sexual advances.

== Trial and conviction ==
On 7 May 1958, he was sentenced by the Somme Cour d'assises to forced labour for life. In July 1968, he received a presidential pardon which reduced his sentence to 20 years of criminal imprisonment. Through automatic sentence reductions, he was released in June 1971 after 15 years of detention. In 1994, he was mowed down on his moped by a motorist on the national road 10 in Trappes. He died three days later, on 5 October 1994, at the age of 81. Previously he was a horse groomer in Chesnay (Yvelines). Robert Avril was buried in the hamlet of Mérangle in Germainville (Eure-et-Loir).

== Legacy ==
The case is famous for having given rise to one of the very first distributions of a composite sketch in France thanks to Henri Van Assche who called on the head of the 2nd mobile brigade of Lille, Émilien Paris. The latter had already tried this technique when he was stationed in Lyon in 1953, but it led to the arrest of an innocent Lyon merchant. This first failure did not compromise the future of the robot portrait, Émilien Paris having since improved the technique whose precursor was Roger Dambron.

According to some journalists, the trauma caused in the region was not unrelated to Marc Fasquel's murderous drift . Aged eight at the time of the events, this native of Chaussée-Tirancourt became famous thirty years later for a series of rapes and two murders, perpetrated with the complicity of his partner Jocelyne Bourdin. This case inspired the screenplay for the film "And Soon the Darkness" by Robert Fuest (1970), written by Terry Nation and Brian Clemens, a film which also incorporates characteristic elements of the television series "The Avengers", for which Terry Nation and Brian Clemens were the main screenwriters.

In 2015, a memorial ceremony was held at the renovated grave of Janet Marshall, with the mayor of La Chaussée-Tirancourt, Philippe François in attendance.

== See also ==
- List of major crimes in France (before 2000)

== Bibliography ==
- Jacques Béal, Philippe Randa, Crimes en Picardie, Martelle, 1993.
- André Sehet, L'affaire Miss Janet Marshall, Racines Calcéennes, 2015.

== Television documentaries ==
- « Affaire Marshall : la traque », le 11 December 2013, dans 50 ans de faits divers, sur 13e rue et sur Planète+ Crime+Investigation.
- (en) Reconstruction of Janet Marshall Murder, British Pathé, 1956.

== Radio documentaries ==
- « L'affaire Janet Marshall », dans L'heure du crime, les 8 June 2012 and 19 June 2015, présenté par Jacques Pradel sur RTL.
- « L'affaire Janet Marshall », dans Hondelatte raconte, le 4 July 2017, présenté par Christophe Hondelatte sur Europe 1.
