= Disparus de l'Isère =

Series of missing child cases in France

Disparus de l'Isère (literally "Disappeared of the Isère") is the collective name given to between nine and twelve disappearances of children in the French département of Isère between 1983 and 1996. Some children were murdered, one was attacked, but survived and others have never been found. Only three of the cases (which themselves consist of two separate, unrelated cases) have been solved.

== Victims ==
1. Philippe Pignot, age 13, disappeared 25 May 1980 in La Morte-sur-Isère, never found.
2. Ludovic Janvier, age 6, disappeared 17 March 1983 in Saint-Martin-d'Hères, never found.
3. Grégory Dubrulle, age 7, disappeared 9 July 1983 in Grenoble, found alive the next day with head injuries in a landfill site in Pommiers-la-Placette.
4. Bones of an unidentified child who had been dead for at least several months and possibly several years – found 12 February 1985 in the Vercors Cave System.
5. Anissa Ouadi, age 5, disappeared 25 June 1985 in Grenoble, found strangled and drowned in Beauvoir dam 13 days later.
6. Charazed Bendouiou, age 10, disappeared 8 July 1987 in Bourgoin-Jallieu, never found.
7. Nathalie Boyer, age 15, disappeared 2 August 1988 in Villefontaine, found murdered in Saint-Quentin-Fallavier.
8. Fabrice Ladoux, age 12, disappeared 13 January 1989 in Grenoble, found murdered three days later, sexually attacked and with a head wound, in Quaix-en-Chartreuse in the Chartreuse Mountains.
9. Rachid Bouzian,* age 8, disappeared 3 August 1990 in Échirolles, found murdered the next day. A suspect was apprehended later that month.
10. Sarah Siad,* age 6, disappeared 16 April 1991 in Voreppe, found murdered.
11. Léo Balley, age 6, disappeared 19 July 1996 on the massif du Taillefer, never found.
12. Saïda Berch,* age 10, disappeared 24 November 1996 in Voreppe, found murdered.

== Investigations ==
In the spring of 2008, the authorities created a unit called "Mineurs 38" ("Minors 38" – 38 being the French departmental code for the Isère), comprising several investigators charged with reexamining all the cases.

=== Solved cases ===
1. The murder of Rachid Bouzian was solved shortly after the event. On 23 August 1990, a man who had taken part in the abduction was arrested, and accused his brother (who had by then fled abroad) of instigating the crime. The former was found guilty of abduction and murder and was sentenced to life imprisonment. He died in prison.
2. The murders of Sarah Siad (1991) and Saïda Berch (1996) were solved thanks to DNA profiling. On 25 July 2013, a man (who had been 15 years old at the time of the first murder) was investigated after traces of his DNA turned up at both of the different places where the two bodies were found. The man's profile was on the FNAEG, the French national DNA database, due to having previously been arrested for driving under the influence and driving without insurance.

== See also ==
- List of fugitives from justice who disappeared
