= Disappearance of Ludovic Janvier =

1983 missing child case in France

Ludovic Janvier
- Born: 1977; France
- Disappeared: March 17, 1983 (age 6); Saint-Martin-d'Hères, France
- Status: Missing for 42 years, 6 months and 4 days

Ludovic Janvier is a six-year-old French boy who went missing on 17 March 1983 from Saint-Martin-d'Hères, a suburb of Grenoble, in the Isère département of south-eastern France. His disappearance has been linked to that of several other children in the area, collectively known as the Disparus de l'Isère (literally, the "Disappeared of the Isère"). Ludovic's whereabouts remain unknown to this day.

== Disappearance ==
Six-year-old Ludovic Janvier disappeared from Saint-Martin-d'Hères on Thursday 17 March 1983. He was last seen in Place de la République, on the way home with his two brothers, Jérôme (8) and Nicolas (2½). They had gone to buy cigarettes for their father sometime between 6:30 and 7:45 pm.

== Investigation ==
Several witnesses testified that a man wearing a construction-style hard hat, blue work overalls and black heavy-duty zip-up shoes approached the boys and said to them: "I've lost my wolf-dog. If you help me find him, I'll buy you sweets." The man allegedly asked them to separate in two different directions. Jérôme and Nicolas went one way, and the unknown man left in the other direction with Ludovic in hand. Jérôme and Nicolas returned home and told their father what had happened. Their father then informed the police.

Later that year, the clerk of a court judge in Grenoble received a phone call informing her that the child had been adopted by a new family. The anonymous correspondent claimed to have read this in the newspaper L'Union de Reims.

On 12 February 1985, police found the body of a child in the nearby Vercors Cave System. The body was never identified.

== Aftermath ==
Around 2010, Virginie – Ludovic's sister – received a phone call from a nurse at a hospital near Reims, a French city 600 km (370 miles) to the north. The nurse claimed to have seen someone resembling Jérôme, Ludovic's older brother. She recognised the now adult Jérôme after seeing him in a news report about Ludovic's disappearance.

In 2011, the Grenoble authorities announced that they were reopening Ludovic Janvier's case, as well as that of another girl in the "Disparus de l'Isère" investigation. Their disappearances were reclassified as "illegal confinement".

In 2013, Ludovic's mother appealed to the authorities in an attempt to find out whether the body of the unidentified child found in 1985 was that of her son.

In 2014, the Grenoble authorities announced that they were closing Ludovic Janvier's case. The family's lawyers, Didier Seban and Corinne Herrmann, hope to appeal this decision on the basis of witness statements which they believe have not been followed up.

In 2015, the Court of Appeal reopened the case and ordered new investigations.

== See also ==
- Disparus de l'Isère
- List of people who disappeared
