= Murder of Gilles Andruet =

1995 unsolved murder of French chess player Gilles Andruet

French chess player Gilles Andruet was murdered during the night of 21–22 August 1995. His body was found on the bank of the Yvette at Saulx-les-Chartreux, in the Essonne department. He had been beaten to death with a baseball bat.

The initial investigation focused on Joseph Liany and his son Franck. In 2003, Joseph Liany was convicted of murder at first instance and sentenced to fifteen years’ imprisonment, while Franck Liany was sentenced to seven years’ imprisonment for handling the proceeds of the murder. Joseph Liany appealed and was acquitted in 2006; his acquittal became final.

Sacha Rhoul was convicted in absentia in 2006. After his extradition to France, he was retried in person before the Essonne Assize Court in January 2014. The advocate general requested his acquittal, stating that Rhoul’s participation in Andruet’s death could not be established and that no evidence supported either a logistical or financial role. The court acquitted him on 30 January 2014. Joseph Liany and Sacha Rhoul were therefore ultimately acquitted. Franck Liany was not convicted as the perpetrator of the killing. No person has been definitively convicted as the perpetrator of Gilles Andruet's murder, and the case remains unresolved.

== Background ==
During the early 1990s, Andruet increasingly frequented casinos and played blackjack using card-counting methods based on his memory and mathematical abilities. After initially winning substantial amounts, he accumulated gambling losses and debts. He later became subject to a French banking ban and could no longer open a bank account.

In August 1995, Andruet received a cheque for approximately 398,000 French francs from the sale of inherited family property. Because he was unable to deposit it into an account of his own, an account was opened with the assistance of Joseph and Franck Liany. Franck Liany was given power of attorney over the account.

== Murder ==
On the evening of 21 August 1995, Andruet stopped outside the Paris restaurant L’Entrecôte to greet a woman he knew who worked there. She was the last known person to see him alive. She later told investigators that she had recognised Joseph Liany among the men in the vehicle.

Andruet's body was found on 22 August on the bank of the Yvette at Saulx-les-Chartreux. It had been wrapped in a mattress protector and was partly immersed in the river. He had been beaten to death with a baseball bat.

The account over which Franck Liany held power of attorney was emptied shortly after Andruet's death.

== Investigation ==
=== Initial focus on Joseph and Franck Liany ===
The initial investigation focused on Joseph Liany and his son Franck. Investigators examined the opening of the bank account, Franck Liany's power of attorney and the withdrawal of the funds after Andruet's death.

According to Le Parisien, Andruet had been staying with Joseph Liany on the evening of his death. The newspaper reported that the mattress protector in which the body was found probably came from Joseph Liany's apartment. Two days after the killing, beds from the apartment were discarded and replaced.

A hair found on the mattress protector was analysed in 2001. The analysis produced a mitochondrial DNA profile rather than a nuclear DNA profile. Because mitochondrial DNA may be shared by members of the same maternal line, the profile did not permit an individual identification.

Le Parisien also reported that Loïc Simon, an employee at the Golf de l’Étoile, had told acquaintances that he had attacked a chess player with a baseball bat in exchange for money allegedly promised by Joseph Liany. Simon died by suicide in 1996 before he could be questioned by the judicial authorities about those reported statements.

=== Late implication of Sacha Rhoul ===
According to La Voix du Nord, Sacha Rhoul was not implicated during the first six years of the investigation. His name entered the case in November 2001, when a former employee told police that Loïc Simon had said he had attacked a chess player with a baseball bat in exchange for money allegedly promised by Joseph Liany. Because Simon was not the person speaking to the police, the allegation reached investigators through an indirect account.

Loïc Simon had died by suicide in 1996 and could therefore not be questioned by investigators about the reported statement.

The investigating judge also relied on the mitochondrial DNA profile obtained from the hair found on the mattress protector. Because Joseph Liany and his nephew Sacha Rhoul belonged to the same maternal line, the profile was compatible with both men and could not individually distinguish Rhoul from Liany.

== Judicial proceedings ==
=== First trial in 2003 ===
The first trial took place before the Essonne Assize Court in November 2003. Joseph Liany and his son Franck were the defendants. Both denied any responsibility for Andruet's death and accused one another.

Among the evidence examined in relation to Joseph Liany was the testimony of the last known person to see Andruet alive. She told investigators that she had recognised Joseph Liany among the men travelling with Andruet shortly before the killing.

According to Le Parisien, the mattress protector in which Andruet's body had been wrapped probably came from Joseph Liany's apartment. The newspaper also reported that beds from the apartment were discarded and replaced two days after the murder.

A hair found on the mattress protector produced a mitochondrial DNA profile compatible with members of the same maternal line. The profile was considered during the proceedings, but it did not permit an individual identification and could therefore correspond to more than one member of that maternal line.

The financial evidence concerned the account opened to receive Andruet's inheritance cheque. Franck Liany held power of attorney over the account and withdrew the funds shortly after Andruet's death. According to Le Parisien, Franck Liany stated that he had given the money to his father, Joseph Liany.

The case also included reports that Loïc Simon had told acquaintances that he had attacked a chess player with a baseball bat in exchange for money allegedly promised by Joseph Liany. Simon died by suicide in 1996 before he could be questioned by the judicial authorities about those reported statements.

At the conclusion of the trial, Joseph Liany was convicted of murder and sentenced to fifteen years’ imprisonment. Franck Liany was sentenced to seven years’ imprisonment for handling the proceeds of a murder; he was not convicted of committing the killing itself.

Joseph Liany appealed against his conviction.

=== Appeal proceedings in 2006 ===
Joseph Liany's appeal was heard in March 2006 before the Val-de-Marne Assize Court, sitting on appeal. The proceedings reconsidered the murder charge for which he had been convicted at first instance in 2003.

The case against Joseph Liany included the testimony of the last known person to see Andruet alive, who said that she had recognised Liany among the men travelling with Andruet shortly before the killing. It also included reports that the mattress protector in which the body had been wrapped probably came from Liany's apartment and that beds from the apartment were discarded and replaced two days after the murder.

The financial evidence concerned the inheritance cheque and the account over which Franck Liany held power of attorney. Franck withdrew the funds shortly after Andruet's death and, according to Le Parisien, stated that he had handed the money to his father, Joseph Liany.

The case also included reports that Loïc Simon had told acquaintances that Joseph Liany had promised him money to attack a chess player with a baseball bat. Simon died by suicide in 1996 before the judicial authorities could question him about those reported statements.

On 15 March 2006, Franck Liany again implicated his father. He told the court that Loïc Simon had said he had been with Joseph Liany on the day of the killing and that the events had taken place in Bonneuil-sur-Marne, where Joseph Liany lived. The prosecution sought Joseph Liany’s conviction.

The court also considered the mitochondrial DNA profile obtained from a hair found on the mattress protector. The profile was compatible with Joseph Liany's maternal line but could not identify him individually. Because his nephew Sacha Rhoul belonged to the same maternal line, the result was also compatible with Rhoul.

On 17 March 2006, Joseph Liany was acquitted on appeal. His acquittal became final.

According to La Voix du Nord, Rhoul's lawyer Éric Dupond-Moretti later stated that Rhoul had not been summoned and had not known that the proceedings held in his absence were beginning.

=== Extradition and proceedings in France ===
Sacha Rhoul was convicted in absentia in 2006 and sentenced to fifteen years’ imprisonment. He was arrested in Morocco in February 2010 and extradited to France shortly afterwards. Upon his arrival, he was placed in custody, then released under judicial supervision in June 2010 after several months’ detention, pending a new trial in his presence.

=== Trial and acquittal of Sacha Rhoul in 2014 ===
Rhoul's trial took place before the Essonne Assize Court in January 2014. He continued to deny any participation in Andruet's death.

The defence argued that Joseph Liany had taken advantage of Rhoul's absence and of the ambiguity of the mitochondrial DNA profile to redirect suspicion towards his nephew. This was an argument advanced by the defence and was not itself a judicial finding.

During the hearing, the advocate general referred to Joseph Liany's final acquittal. According to La Voix du Nord, he said that he did not necessarily agree with that acquittal but acknowledged that it was final. He added that a possible previous injustice should not be followed by another and expressly asked the jury to acquit Rhoul.

The prosecution stated that Rhoul's role in Andruet's death could not be established. It considered whether he might have had a logistical or financial role but concluded that no evidence supported either possibility.

On 30 January 2014, after less than two hours of deliberation, the court acquitted Rhoul in accordance with the prosecution's request.

Following the verdict, defence lawyer Éric Dupond-Moretti said that the decision was not an acquittal based merely on doubt but one based, in his words, on Rhoul's “total innocence”. This was a statement by the defence lawyer and not a separate legal finding by the court.

== Current status ==
Joseph Liany's conviction at first instance was followed by his final acquittal on appeal. Sacha Rhoul's conviction in absentia was followed by a new trial in his presence and his acquittal. Franck Liany's conviction concerned property obtained through the murder and did not identify him as the person who killed Andruet.

No person has been definitively convicted as the perpetrator of Gilles Andruet's murder. The identity of the killer has therefore not been judicially established, and the case remains unresolved.
