= Pierre Laget =

French murderer and suspected serial killer

- Born: 11 July 1885; Gignac, France
- Died: 1 September 1944 (aged 59); Devil's Island, Salvation Islands, French Guiana
- Convictions: Murder x1 Attempted murder x1
- Penalty: Death; commuted to 20 years penal labour

Details
- Victims: 1–3
- Span of crimes: 1922–1929
- Country: France
- State: Hérault
- Date apprehended: 10 February 1930

Pierre Laget (11 July 1885 – 1 September 1944) was a French dentist, convicted murderer and suspected serial killer who fatally poisoned his wife and later attempted to kill his younger sister between December 1929 and February 1930. Although he was also suspected of killing his first wife and aunt in 1922 and 1923, he was convicted for the latter crimes and sentenced to death, but his sentence was later commuted by President Paul Doumer.

While serving his new sentence in prison, he committed suicide in September 1944.

== Biography ==
=== Youth ===
Pierre Laget was born on 11 July 1885, in Gignac. He had a younger sister, Marie-Louise, and was described by his parents as a brilliant pupil through his school years, between September 1891 and July 1903. Later on, he went to a high school in Béziers and later on to the University of Montpelier, from where he graduated in 1909 with a degree in medicine.

=== Occupation, first marriage and first world war ===
After his graduation, in September, 1909, the 24-year-old Laget became a dentist and opened his own practice in Béziers, in 1910.

In 1911, he met a woman named Sarah Alexandre, whom he subsequently married in 1912. Their union produced two children, Jean and Gaston. Another child, Jacqueline, died shortly after birth.

In August 1914, Laget was mobilized and went to fight at the front, where he was injured on 31 August; however, he recovered and was dispatched back. After the armistice was signed on 11 November 1918, he returned home where his relationship with his wife quickly began deteriorating. Laget always arrived later to his office, much to the dismay of his patients, but used this as an opportunity to welcome mistresses and gamble. After discovering his double life, Sarah began to frequently argue with him, initially only in private but later in public as well and sometimes in front of family members. Noémie, Sarah's sister, and her husband Georges Leboucher often witnessed these arguments and regularly had to calm and dissuade the young wife from divorcing her husband. Sarah Laget then bequeathed 262,000 francs to her children and their father who, until they came of age, was to hold the money in trust for them. Upon learning this, Pierre concocted a scheme to obtain the money for himself.

=== First suspicious death ===
One morning in April 1922, Sarah Laget fell gravely ill, constantly vomiting and unable to get out of bed. Doctors suspected that she might be suffering from cancer but were incapable of doing anything as it was poorly understood at the time. Meanwhile, a seemingly unconcerned Laget tried to ease his wife's pain by treating her with herbal tea, which had secretly been poisoned with arsenic.

On 28 May 1922, Sarah succumbed to her mysterious ailment. Georges, her brother-in-law, informed the Alexandre family of his suspicions towards Pierre, which seemed to be validated when the family learned that Sarah had 262,000 insured for her children, but as they weren't old enough, it was temporarily given to their father. As for Laget himself, he seemed to quickly recover from his wife's tragic death.

At the end of 1922, only a few months after Sarah's death, Laget decided to remarry, choosing his first wife's younger sister, Suzanne, as his bride. While the Alexandre family were unhappy with this predicament as they were well aware of the doctor's penchant for women and money, they still agreed to pay the 300,000 francs sum for the marriage.

=== Second suspicious death ===
In 1923, while Laget was preparing for his wedding, his aunt suddenly died, much to his indifference. Due to the woman's advanced age, it was recorded as due to natural causes and ignored. On 26 January 1924, Laget married Suzanne; they later had one daughter, Micheline. After Suzanne took out a life insurance policy on herself in 1925, Laget decided to take advantage of the situation, buying himself a gigantic villa in Tarn and other real estate, where he frequently went to spend his money. By the end of 1928, he was broke.

=== Third suspicious death ===
In the beginning of 1929, Suzanne suddenly fell ill with symptoms similar to those of her sister years prior. Over the course of several months, she lost her eyesight and ability to speak, with her condition worsening even more by the summer.

On 12 August 1929, Suzanne Laget died in her bed. When questioned by her family, Pierre claimed that it was the result of a hereditary disease; unconvinced by his claims, the Alexandre family members looked into whether she had any life insurance policies on her. To their shock, they discovered that Suzanne had indeed been insured for 100,000, which would automatically go to Pierre if she died.

In mid-August, Laget announced that he planned to marry for a third time, this time to one of his mistresses, a woman named Paule. This proposition was opposed by his sister, Marie-Louise, who also began to demand that he repay her a debt of 172,000 francs. Because of this, the two got into a heated argument after which Laget decided that he wanted to get rid of his sister.

=== Attempted murder and exposure ===
Near the end of August 1929, Marie-Louise Laget caught a slight cough after spending a vacation with her older brother. She recovered from it rather quickly, and the examining doctor, Dr. Roulleau, concluded that it was from intoxication. While he was relieved that his foiled attempt went by unnoticed, Pierre remained indebted to his sister and began offering arsenic-laced soups and herbal teas to her.

On Christmas Day, Marie-Louise fell ill again but was unable to recover, spending four weeks under the care of Dr. Roulleau. As her condition worsened, Roulleau and his colleague, Dr. Pages, worked to have her hospitalized in January 1930.

On 1 February 1930, the doctors advised that Marie-Louise be housed in a specialized establishment, explicitly forbidding Pierre Laget from visiting her as they suspected he had attempted to poison her. After two days without contact with Pierre, Marie-Louise's condition improved. She later confided to her doctor that her brother visited her every day to treat her with some tea, but she got worse and worse with each day after drinking it. On the advice of Dr. Roulleau, Marie-Louise filed a complaint against Pierre for attempted poisoning, in which she was joined by the Alexandre family.

=== Arrest and investigation ===
On 10 February 1930, Pierre Laget was arrested and placed in preventative detention. Although he claimed he was innocent, he was charged with two counts of murder and one count of attempted murder. Puzzlingly, a crazy rumour was started in Béziers that Marie-Louise, after having an affair with a married man who infected her with syphilis and impregnated her, had asked her brother to poison her with arsenic to 'get to' the child and cure her illness. To disprove these allegations, Marie-Louise agreed to undergo several medical exams, which conclusively concluded that she had never been pregnant or had syphilis but had indeed been poisoned with arsenic.

On 14 March, the bodies of Sarah and Suzanne were exhumed for autopsy in front of their husband, who seemed impassive about the ordeal. The coroners later proved that Suzanne had indeed been poisoned with arsenic but were unable to definitively say the same for Sarah, whose body was too decomposed. Charged with the murder of his two wives, Laget was returned to prison, and the two bodies were reburied.

In April 1930, the body of Laget's aunt was also exhumed, but as they were unable to find any indicators of foul play, no charges were brought against him. In December, Laget was transferred to the cour d'assises in Hérault. He was moved to Montpellier prison in May 1931.

=== Trial ===
On 3 June 1931, Laget's trial began to much public fascination. The doctor tirelessly proclaimed his innocence, claiming that perhaps the victims had deliberately poisoned themselves, but his claims were rebuked by the judges.

After six days, Laget was convicted of killing his second wife as well as the attempted poisoning of his sister but was acquitted of killing his first wife. As a result, the cour d'assises of Hérault sentenced him to death.

A day after the verdict, Laget insisted to his lawyer that he "preferred the scaffold to perpetual prison", but he nonetheless allowed an appeal to be filed, which was promptly dismissed on 19 September 1931.

=== Commutation, prison and suicide ===
Ten days after his appeal's dismissal, Laget's death sentence was commuted to life in prison by President Paul Doumer. Days later, he was sent to Devil's Island, where he worked for several years as a nurse. In 1938, his sentence was reduced to 20 years penal labour. Unable to bear the fact that he was known as a killer, Pierre Laget committed suicide on 1 September 1944, by swallowing a large dose of poison. He left behind a suicide letter, expressing his desire to end it all and requesting that he not be resuscitated.

== See also ==
- List of French serial killers

=== Radio broadcasts ===
- "The Laget Affair: The Double Life of Dr. Mystery", aired 30 October 2015 on L'Heure du crime on RTL, presented by Jacques Pradel.
- "Pierre Laget, Doctor Poisoner", aired 25 September 2019 on Hondelatte tells, presented by Christophe Hondelatte on Europe 1.
