= Claude Lastennet =

French serial killer (1971–2023)

- Born: January 19, 1971; Brest, Finistère Department, France
- Died: December 19, 2023 (aged 52); Poitiers-Vivonne Penitentiary Center, Vivonne, Vienne Department, France
- Conviction: Murder x5
- Penalty: Life imprisonment with 18 years security period

Details
- Victims: 5
- Span of crimes: 1993–1994
- Country: France
- States: Val-de-Marne, Hauts-de-Seine
- Date apprehended: January 12, 1994

Claude Lastennet (January 19, 1971 – December 19, 2023) was a French serial killer who was convicted of murdering five elderly women in several Parisian suburbs between August 1993 and January 1994. He was convicted and sentenced to life imprisonment with the possibility of parole for these crimes, and died behind bars.

== Early life ==
Lastennet was born on January 19, 1971, in Brest, just a few minutes after his older brother Frédéric. The son of a sailor who never interacted with the family, and the two boys were raised separately by aunts and uncles in Crozon, while their mother Jacqueline left for Paris to earn money as a postal worker. She took in her children two years later to live with her in the capital, but all three returned to live in their native region in 1983, settling in Morlaix.

In 1984, Jacqueline married a man ten years younger than her with whom she had two more children - Claude, who was very attached to his mother, saw this union as a "betrayal". This, coupled with the bad relationship with his alcoholic stepfather, led the then-14-year-old Lastennet to flee from home in 1985. He graduated from a school in Quimper with certificates in restaurant management and pastry-making, and started working as a seasonal waiter at a hostel. Around 1987, Lastennet got addicted to hashish and started dealing drugs at the hostel.

After being discharged from the French Army, Lastennet admitted himself to a psychiatric hospital in 1990, after suffering a mental breakdown upon learning of his grandmother's death. The following year, he was hired to work at the Chez Dumonet restaurant in Montparnasse, where he gained a reputation for having "trysts" with older female customers. His former employer noted that Lastennet refused to serve customers that he disliked, ultimately leading to his dismissal.

In February 1993, while staying with his brother in Paris, Lastennet attempted suicide by swallowing Lexomil, but survived. Several months later, in August, he abruptly stopped taking his medication altogether and started searching for elderly people on the streets.

== Murders ==
=== First murder ===
On August 24, 1993, a woman living at 51 Avenue du Président-Franklin-Roosevelt in Chevilly-Larue noticed Lastennet standing motionless on the opposite sidewalk. After a while, she called out to him and asked what he was doing, with the young man replying that he was looking for number 52. After being given instructions to where it is, he realized that it is a public park and instead went to number 49, where there was a bungalow occupied by 87-year-old Marcelle Cavilier. Lastennet broke the glass on the door, reached for the key and unlocked the door, after which he went inside and threatened Cavilier to give up all her money. When she refused, Lastennet strangled her in her bedroom, leaving her lying on her back on the bed, with her feet touching the floor. He then searched through the bungalow, stole 12,000 francs and left.

That same day, Cavilier's family arrived home, only to find their relative dead and with a heavily swollen face. Investigators were summoned, but were unable to obtain any useful information aside from the neighbor claiming that she had observed a strange young man who, three days earlier, stood outside the house for two hours. While her descriptions allowed a facial composite to be made, this did not aid in the capture of Lastennet at the time.

In September 1993, Lastennet paid his rent and debts using the stolen money. In his later confessions, he claimed that he was depressed at the time and had no intent of killing Cavilier, but after escaping seemingly unnoticed, he developed an "urge to kill" and continued his criminal activities.

=== Later murders ===
On November 15, at 19 Edgar-Quinet Street in Thiais, Lastennet broke a window pane on the veranda of 76-year-old Antoinette Bonin's house, breaking inside. Startled by the sound of broken glass, Antoinette went into the room, where she was attacked and strangled by Lastennet. While rummaging through a cupboard in the kitchen, he was discovered by Antoinette's son François, who had come to check in on his mother. When asked what he was doing there, Lastennet calmly replied that the old woman had a fit and that she was lying in the back room with blood coming out of her ear. François immediately went to her side and after realizing that she was unresponsive, he turned to the mysterious man, who by then had already fled.

After noticing the broken window and the ransacked rooms, François concluded that the man was a burglar and immediately informed his wife Nicole, who called the police. Initially, police suspected that it was François who killed his mother, as during interrogations with the family, they noted that his sister claimed that her brother always coveted his mother's house. A palm print was located on the broken window pane, and it was taken into evidence.

On the following day, Lastennet broke into a home in Boulogne-Billancourt occupied by 72-year-old Raymonde Dolisy (sometimes reported as Suzanne Fournier), strangling her before ransacking the place. Her body was not found until three days later by the building block's concierge, who was alarmed by the amount of postcards stacked at her door.

On December 18, Lastennet broke into a house in Bourg-la-Reine and strangled the occupant, 91-year-old Augustine Royer, whose body was found on the next day. After this murder, investigators noticed that the crime scenes were scattered along the 1924 bus route, leading to them finally interviewing François Bonin about the supposed burglar he had seen. Bonin provided them a sketch of the man he had seen.

Two days later, in Chevilly-Larue, Lastennet broke into the home of 82-year-old Polish immigrant Rosalie Czajka and demanded that she hand over money at gunpoint. Czajka gave him 500 francs, but Lastennet demanded more and threatened to kill her. Czajka defended herself and screamed, attracting the attention of a neighbor. In the ensuing struggle, Lastennet dropped a cap that he was wearing and was scared off.

On January 8, 1994, on Avenue de Versailles in Thiais, Lastennet broke into the third-floor apartment of 92-year-old Violette de Ferluc and strangled her. He then ripped out the telephone wires and ransacked the apartment before fleeing. De Ferluc's body was found on the following day by her son Gérard, who had gone to deliver food to her.

== Investigation and arrest ==
On January 11, 1994, Arnaud Bossu, another young man who lived in the same hostel as Lastennet, contacted the police claiming that his friend had asked him how to use a credit card he had stolen from an old woman he had murdered. Upon seeing Bossu's disgusted reaction, Lastennet immediately retracted his question and claimed that he was lying, but Bossu realized that he was being serious after reading an article in the newspaper about Violette de Ferluc's murder.

On the following day, Lastennet was arrested at his apartment while asleep in bed. He did not resist and immediately admitted responsibility, with a search of his apartment leading to the discovery of the stolen credit card, numerous pieces of jewelry, a beret and a radio. While in police custody, Lastennet gave another confession giving a detail account of all his crimes, claiming that he chose his victims based on certain things that captured his attention - for example, he claimed that he chose Dolisy because of the big glasses that she was wearing.

== Trials, imprisonment and death ==
In October 1997, Lastennet's trial began at the cour d'assises in Créteil, with Pierre Olivier-Sur acting as his attorney. During the legal proceedings, Lastennet spoke about his crimes in the third person, claiming that he was imbued with fantasy and that he "dealt out death to become immortal, like Satan." He also revealed that whenever he strangled his victims to death, he would dip his right little finger in the blood gushing from their ears or nose, as blood "excited [him]." In the testimony, he also said that he was inspired by stories of vampires and Lucifer.

On October 22, 1997, Lastennet was convicted on all counts and sentenced to life imprisonment with a security period of at least 18 years, making him eligible for parole in January 2012. During his incarceration, he claimed that psychotherapy lessons helped him regain his sense of self and that he was improving as a person behind bars.

This was never granted, and he died while serving his sentence at the Poitiers-Vivonne Penitentiary Center on December 19, 2023.

== List of victims ==
Date	Name of victim	Age at death
24 August 1993	Marcelle Cavilier	87
15 November 1993	Antoinette Bonin	76
16 November 1993	Raymonde Dolisy (née Fournier)	72
18 December 1993	Augustine Royer	91
8 January 1994	Violette de Ferluc	92

== See also ==
- List of French serial killers

== Books ==
- Jean-Pierre Vergès (September 26, 2007). Les tueurs en série [Serial killers] (in French). Hachette Plaque. ISBN 2012374174.

== In the media and culture ==
- The case was covered on Faites entrer l'accusé on the episode "Claude Lastennet, the old lady killer" (French: Claude Lastennet, le tueur de vieilles dames), hosted by Christophe Hondelatte on December 6, 2009.
- It was also covered on L'Heure du Crime with the episode "The Claude Lastennet Affair" (French: L'affaire Claude Lastennet), hosted by Jacques Pradel on June 3, 2014.
