= Custines =

- Commune
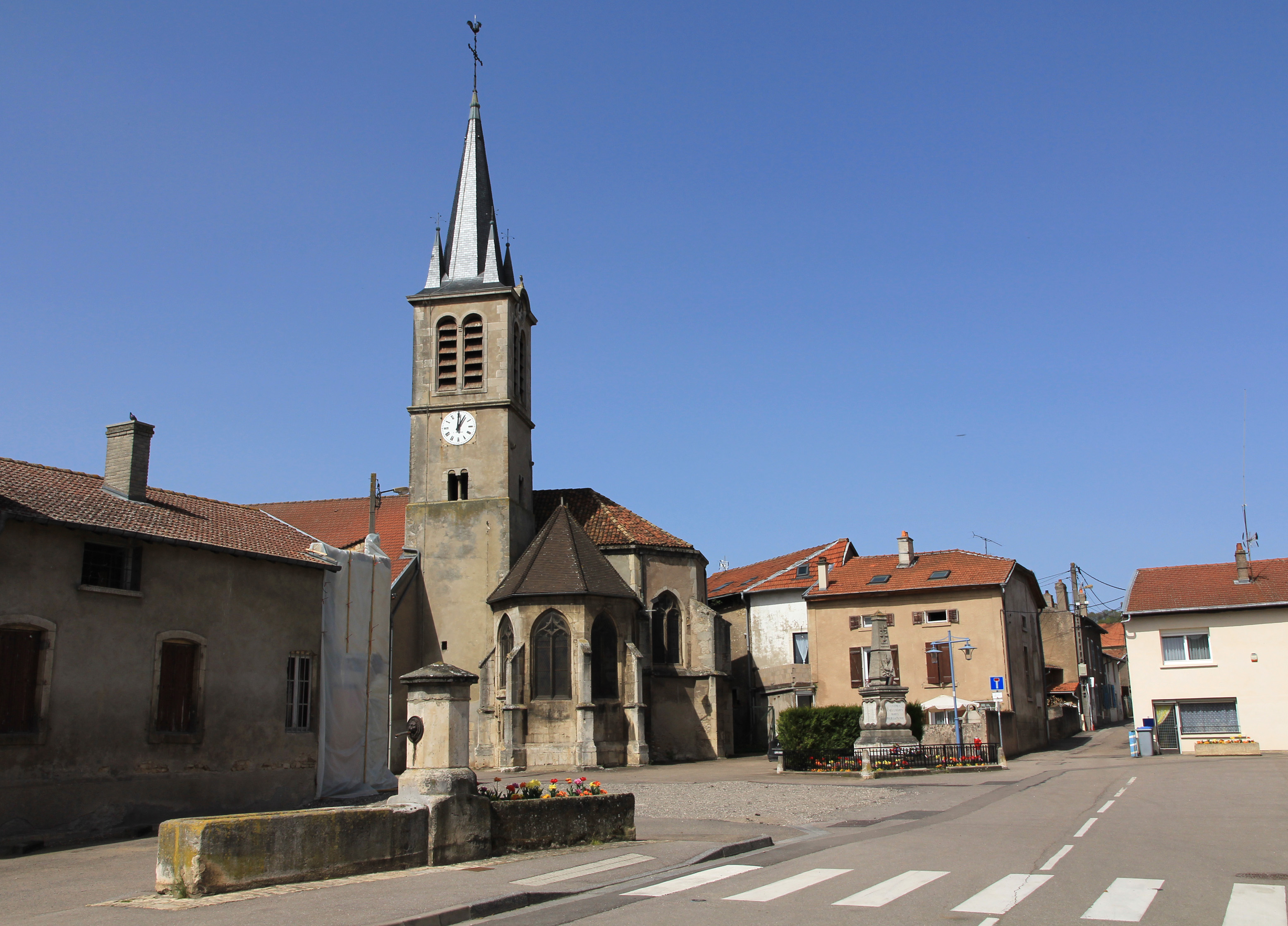
- Saint-Léger Church in Custines

- Coat of arms
- Location of Custines
- Location within France Location within Grand Est
- Coordinates: 48°47′33″N 6°08′36″E
- Country: France
- Region: Grand Est
- Department: Meurthe-et-Moselle
- Arrondissement: Nancy
- Canton: Entre Seille et Meurthe
- Intercommunality: CC du Bassin de Pompey

Government
  - Mayor (2020–2026): Pierre Julien
- Area^{1}: 11.76 km^{2} (4.54 sq mi)
- Elevation: 195 m (640 ft)
- Highest elevation: 395 m (1,296 ft)
- Lowest elevation: 182 m (597 ft)
- Population (2023): 3,089
  - Density: 262.7/km^{2} (680.3/sq mi)
- Time zone: UTC+01:00 (CET)
  - Summer (DST): UTC+02:00 (CEST)
- INSEE/Postal code: 54150 /54670
- ^{1} French Land Register data, which excludes lakes, ponds, glaciers > 1 km^{2} (0.386 sq mi or 247 acres) and river estuaries.

Custines (French pronunciation: [kystin]) is a commune in the Meurthe-et-Moselle department in north-eastern France.

== History ==
The town was called Condé until 1719.

== Population ==
Historical population
Year	Pop.	±% p.a.
1968	3,046	—
1975	2,900	−0.70%
1982	2,841	−0.29%
1990	2,813	−0.12%
1999	2,991	+0.68%
2007	3,002	+0.05%
2012	2,861	−0.96%
2017	3,079	+1.48%
2023	3,089	+0.05%
Source: INSEE

== See also ==
- Communes of the Meurthe-et-Moselle department
