= Vacheresse =

- Commune
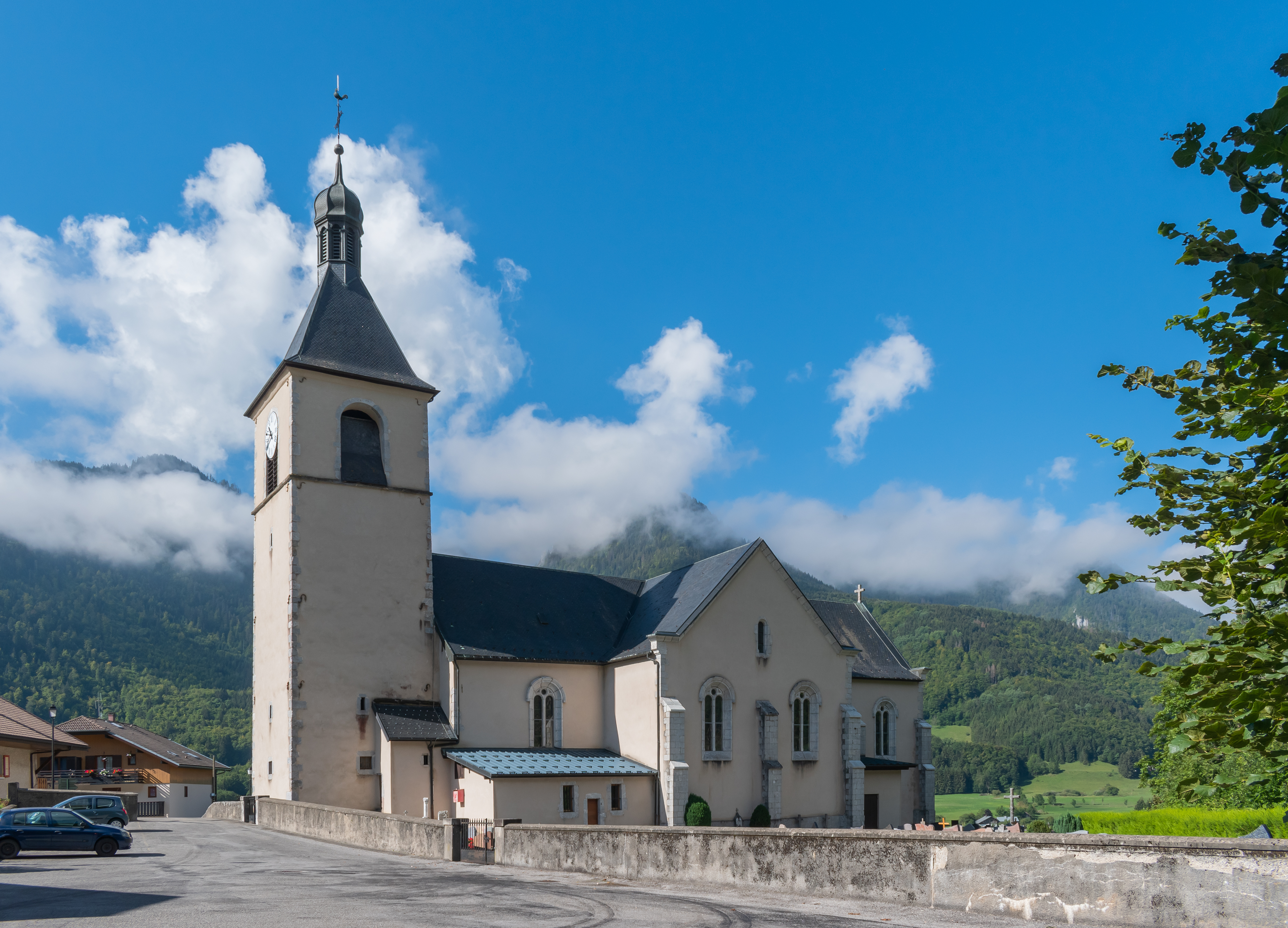
- Church of Saint-Étienne

- Coat of arms
- Location of Vacheresse
- Location within France Location within Auvergne-Rhône-Alpes
- Coordinates: 46°19′31″N 6°40′28″E
- Country: France
- Region: Auvergne-Rhône-Alpes
- Department: Haute-Savoie
- Arrondissement: Thonon-les-Bains
- Canton: Évian-les-Bains
- Intercommunality: Pays d'Évian Vallée d'Abondance

Government
  - Mayor (2024–2026): Jean Tupin-Bron
- Area^{1}: 31.02 km^{2} (11.98 sq mi)
- Highest elevation: 2,090 m (6,860 ft)
- Lowest elevation: 755 m (2,477 ft)
- Population (2023): 939
  - Density: 30.3/km^{2} (78.4/sq mi)
- Time zone: UTC+01:00 (CET)
  - Summer (DST): UTC+02:00 (CEST)
- INSEE/Postal code: 74286 /74360
- ^{1} French Land Register data, which excludes lakes, ponds, glaciers > 1 km^{2} (0.386 sq mi or 247 acres) and river estuaries.

Vacheresse (French pronunciation: [vaʃʁɛs]; Arpitan: Vashrèfe) is a commune in the Haute-Savoie department in the Auvergne-Rhône-Alpes region in south-eastern France.

== Population ==
Historical population
Year	Pop.	±% p.a.
1968	571	—
1975	559	−0.30%
1982	523	−0.95%
1990	533	+0.24%
1999	606	+1.44%
2007	729	+2.34%
2012	781	+1.39%
2017	855	+1.83%
2023	939	+1.57%
Source: INSEE

== See also ==
- Communes of the Haute-Savoie department
