= Hartland (surname) =

Hartland is a surname. Notable people with the surname Hartland include:

- Blair Hartland (born 1966), New Zealand cricketer
- Colleen Hartland (born 1959), Australian politician
- Edwin Sidney Hartland (1848–1927), British folklorist
- Ethel Mary Hartland (1875–1964), Welsh magistrate and activist
- George Hartland (1884–1944), British politician
- Gertrude Hartland (1865–1954), Irish illustrator and landscape painter
- Henry Albert Hartland (1840–1893), Irish artist
- Ian Hartland (1939–1992) New Zealand cricketer
- John Hartland (1862–1918), New Zealand cricketer
- Kerri Hartland, Australian public servant
- Michael Hartland (born 1941), British thriller writer
- William Baylor Hartland (1836–1912), Irish plantsman

== See also ==
- Baron Hartland, Irish peerage
- Hartland
- Hartland (given name)
