= Heartland =

Heartland or Heartlands may refer to:

== Businesses and organisations ==
- Heartland Bank, a New Zealand-based financial institution
- Heartland Inn, a chain of hotels based in Iowa, United States
- Heartland Alliance, an anti-poverty organization in Chicago, Illinois, U.S.
- The Heartland Institute, a libertarian thinktank based in Chicago, Illinois, U.S.
- Heartland Payment Systems, a payment processing company based in Oklahoma City, Oklahoma, U.S.

== Film and television ==
- Heartland (1979 film), a film starring Rip Torn and Conchata Ferrell
- Heartland (1989 film), a British television film featuring Jane Horrocks
- Heartland (2026 film), an American mystery thriller film
- Heartlands (film), a 2002 film starring Michael Sheen and Celia Imrie
- Heartland (1979 TV series), a British series made by ATV (Associated Television)
- Heartland (1989 TV series), an American comedy series starring Brian Keith
- Heartland (Australian TV series), a 1994 television series starring Cate Blanchett
- Heartland (Canadian TV series), a 2007 drama series
- Heartland (2007 American TV series), a medical drama series
- Heartland with John Kasich, an American political television show
- The Heartland Series, a production of WBIR-TV in Tennessee
- "Heartland" (Kavanagh QC), a 1995 television episode

== Television channels ==
- Heartland (TV network), an American country music & lifestyle-focused television network
- TVNZ Heartland, a defunct New Zealand television channel

== Literature ==
- Heartland (Shiau novel), a 1999 novel by Daren Shiau set in Singapore
- Heartland (novel series), an equestrian, young-adult series by Lauren Brooke
- Heartland (comics), a comic book series by Garth Ennis and Steve Dillon
- Heartland (Smarsh book), a 2018 memoir by Sarah Smarsh
- Heartland, a 2009 football-themed novel by Anthony Cartwright (writer)
- Heartland, a 1964 novel by Wilson Harris
- Heartland, a 2004 novel by John MacKay
- Heartland, a 1976 autobiography by Mort Sahl

== Music ==
- Heartland rock, a late-1970s and 1980s genre of rock music
- Heartland (American band), an American country music band
- Heartland (British band), a British hard rock band

=== Albums ===
- Heartland (Client album) (2007)
- Heartland (The Judds album) (1987)
- Heartland (Nelly album) (2021)
- Heartland (Owen Pallett album) (2010)
- Heartland (Real Life album) (1983)
- Heartland (Runrig album) (1985)
- Heartlands (Kate Rusby album) (2003)
- Heartland (Michael Stanley Band album) (1979)
- Heartland, a 2017 album by John Tibbs
- Celtic Thunder: Heartland, by Celtic Thunder (2012)

=== Songs ===
- "Heartland" (George Strait song), 1993
- "Heartland" (U2 song), 1988
- "Heartland", by the Sisters of Mercy from Some Girls Wander by Mistake, 1992
- "Heartland", by the Sound from Jeopardy, 1980
- "Heartland", by The The from Infected, 1986
- "Heartland", by Bob Dylan and Willie Nelson from Across the Borderline, 1993

== Places ==
- Heartland (United States), a central U.S. cultural region
- Heartland, Texas, U.S.
- Heartlands Cornwall, a mining attraction in Pool, England
- Heartland of America Park, Omaha, Nebraska, U.S.
- Heartland Village, Staten Island, New York City, U.S.
- Southern Illinois ("Little Egypt"), Illinois, U.S.

== Schools ==
- Heartland Baptist Bible College, Oklahoma, U.S.
- Heartland Christian Academy, Missouri, Shelby County, Missouri, U.S.
- Heartland Christian School, Ohio, U.S.
- Heartland Community College, Illinois, U.S.
- Heartland Elementary School, Kansas, U.S.
- Heartlands Academy, Birmingham, England
- Heartlands High School, London, England

== Sports ==
- Heartland Championship, a New Zealand rugby union competition
- Heartland Collegiate Athletic Conference, an American N.C.A.A. league in Division III
- Heartland Conference, a defunct American N.C.A.A. league in Division II
- Heartland F.C., a Nigerian association football club
- Heartland League, a defunct American baseball league
- Heartland Trophy, an American-football award for Iowa–Wisconsin games

== Other uses ==
- Heartland (video game), 1986

== See also ==
- Hartland (disambiguation)
- Heartland Theory in geopolitics
- Heartlanders, a 2002 Singaporean television series
- List of institutions and events with Heartland in their name
