= List of institutions and events with Heartland in their name =

== Organizations and institutions ==
- Schools:
  - Heartland Baptist Bible College
  - Heartland Community College, in Illinois
  - Heartland Elementary School, part of the Blue Valley Unified School District, Kansas, USA
- Heartland Institute, political research
- Commercial and industrial:
  - Heartland Payment Systems
  - Heartland Corridor, American transportation complex
  - Heartland Flyer, railroad route
  - Heartland Inn, chain of hotels based in Iowa, USA
- Occasional events
  - Heartland Film Festival in Indiana
  - Heartland Pagan Festival

== Sports ==
- Leagues:
  - Heartland League, independent baseball league that operated from 1996–98 in the central United States
  - Heartland Conference, American NCAA Division II college athletic conference
  - Heartland Collegiate Athletic Conference (HCAC), American NCAA Division III college athletic conference
  - Heartland Wrestling Association, independent wrestling promotion based in Cincinnati, Ohio, USA
- Teams:
  - Heartland F.C., formerly Iwuanyanwu Nationale, Nigerian soccer club based in Owerri, Nigeria
  - St. Louis Heartland Eagles, Tier 1 junior ice hockey team playing in the West Division of the United States Hockey League (USHL)
- Heartland Championship, amateur domestic rugby union competition in New Zealand
- Heartland Park Topeka, multi-purpose motorsports facility south of Topeka, Kansas, USA
- Heartland Trophy, brass bull presented to the winner of the Iowa–Wisconsin American football game

== See also ==
- Hartland (disambiguation)
