= Thamesmead Housing Co-operative =

Housing estate in Thamesmead, London

Coordinates: 51°30′21″N 0°7′3″E

The Thamesmead Housing Co-operative was a housing estate in Thamesmead, South East London in the London Borough of Greenwich. It was a purpose-built housing cooperative and like others it was an experiment in building close-knit communities and as a way of helping single people and couples.

It was initially wound up in the mid to late 1980s and then managed by Hyde Housing Association (now The Hyde Group) with the committee structure continuing for allocations and liaison with Hyde.

== Co-operative ==
Thamesmead Housing Co-operative was established to address the lack of housing for vulnerable single people in the area. It was the sister site to the Deptford Housing Co-operative. Applicants to live on the Co-op were interviewed in order to establish their housing needs and also their ability to co-exist with others in shared houses. New tenants were required to purchase a £1 share in order to become a member of the co-operative, which entitled them to attend and vote in the annual general meeting, to elect or stand for the management committee, participate in the co-operative's affairs and receive its services.

The co-operative consisted of an enclave in red brick of 30 flats, 20 shared houses.. The flats were intended for couples but not families and the houses were shared by 4 - 6 people, some having a purpose build disabled unit attached. The buildings were laid out in five courtyards with addresses in Blyth Road and Slocum Close. A hall and office were provided for purpose of holding meetings and managing the co-operative.

The interview and selection process was wound up under Hyde's management, As this wound down the scheme inevitably gained less genuine and more friend based applications. Opinions have been put forward that this was due to overseas students but certainly by 1997 this not the case according to one of the last Management Committees of the Management Co-op,

A BBC article about Thamesmead as a whole has suggested it was a residential starting point in the UK for West African students and that it had become known locally "Little Lagos". In fact this term was originally used for Peckham (LIttle Lagos) and the name was later applied to various ares of the Borough of Greenwich. It should be borne in mind however that at those times there were significant right wing political (BNP) activities in the area 1993 Welling riots, murder of Stephen Lawrence , Murder of Rolan Adams and the BNP bookshop in Welling, and that the racially biased term being used was never widely in use for the Co-op

== Transfer to Hyde Housing ==
Difficulties in running the co-operative as a stand-alone project led to the involvement of Hyde Housing Association, which took over the management of the properties around some time before 1988.

During the transition period the project ran under two names, the original Thamesmead Housing Co-Op and Thamesmead Management Co-Op, as named by Hyde Housing. It was run from the Community Hall, adjacent to the Hyde Housing Office at Blyth Road, London, SE28 8LJ. Residents after the dissolution of the Housing Co-op were all tenants of Hyde Housing Association.

The Management Co-op continued under Hyde until after 1997. The final Management Committee at that time, after investigations with a past member of the old Co-op, established that the transfer process had not been correctly handled. In order to put this right a new interim Housing Co-op was legally established purely to enact the transfer to Hyde.

The properties have continued as a shared housing scheme.

== See also ==
- Clays Lane Estate across the river
- Deptford Housing Co-op is still running
- Sanford Housing Co-operative is still running
