= John Hands (author) =

British author (born 1945)

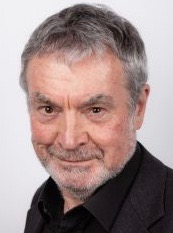
- Hands in 2022
- Born: 19 January 1945 (age 81); Lancashire, England
- Education: University of London
- Occupations: Non-fiction author; novelist; and tutor
- Writing career
- Notable work: The Future of Humankind 2023, Cosmosapiens 2015, Housing Co-operatives 1975
- Website: www.johnhands.com

John Hands (born 19 January 1945) is a British author who has been published in 12 countries. Trained as a scientist, he has written three novels, plus non-fiction books, most recently The Future of Humankind: Why We Should Be Optimistic, the sequel to Cosmosapiens: Human Evolution from the Origin of the Universe, which spans scientific disciplines from cosmology to neuroscience, and Housing Co-operatives.

== Biography ==
Hands was born near Rochdale in Lancashire, England, and read chemistry at Queen Mary College, University of London. He was elected president of the University of London Union, the first undergraduate to occupy that post. He worked in cooperatives, including as founding director of the Government's Co-operative Housing Agency, and served on three Government committees.

From 1987 to 1990, Hands tutored in physics as well as management studies for the Open University, and contributed features to national newspapers while also writing novels.

In 2001, he was appointed visiting lecturer in creative writing at the University of North London, and in 2004 Royal Literary Fund Fellow at University College London (UCL), a post he held for five years.

Afterwards, he became an external tutor in the Graduate School for 10 years, giving 2-day interactive workshops showing students what they need to produce an effective PhD. These workshops were also given at other graduate schools in London.

== Books ==
=== Cosmosapiens ===
Hands won an Arts Council England award to research and write Cosmosapiens: Human Evolution from the Origin of the Universe, published in the UK by Duckworth Overlook in 2015 and in the US in 2016. It was subsequently published in Germany, Spain, China, Korea, and Romania. The book constitutes a survey of current scientific knowledge of human evolution from the origin of the universe, in which Hands argues that commonly accepted theories including the Big Bang, Darwinism and the selfish gene are contradicted by twenty-first-century evidence; concluding that, uniquely, the human species, possesses self-reflective consciousness—and is still evolving, not physically or genetically but mentally.

The book was selected by two reviewers in the Times Literary Supplement as a 2015 Book of the Year: A.N. Wilson called it "an invaluable encyclopedic achievement " and Tim Crane described it as "Lucid and intelligible to non-specialists... a book of astonishing ambition and scope". Nicholas Blincoe listed it as one of the Best Science Books of 2015 in The Daily Telegraph, calling it "Shocking and invigorating". It was also praised in The Observer.

=== The Future of Humankind ===
Published in 2023, the sequel to Cosmosapiens begins where that book finished, at the present. Hands evaluates forecasts for human extinction, survival, and transformation. He then shows what they have in common before making his own unique forecast by projecting into the future the distinct pattern in the scientific evidence of an accelerating cosmic evolutionary process over some 15 billion years.

Professor Denis Noble CBE, FRS, FMedSci, MAE reviewed the book, saying it “really brings all the relevant facts and problems together in a magnificently coherent way. It is at one and the same time a treasure trove of research and careful arguments”, while Perry Marshall, author of Evolution 2.0, said “it’s majestic. Impossible not to finish.”

=== Housing Co-operatives ===
The definitive book on housing co-operatives round the world, republished with a new introduction for 2016. Three chapters focus on the establishment and management of the Sanford Housing Co-operative, the first housing co-operative in the United Kingdom with its own purpose-designed new buildings, which Hands pioneered.

The Architects’ Journal said “John Hands’ timely and exemplary guide is marvellous...this is a book for all concerned with the role of and effects of housing in this society of ours”, while The Guardian commented “Shock, horror, drama. A new book is out about housing which says it's all about people and not about social engineering or investing for your old age...it's by John Hands who has actually succeeded in doing what he's talking about, which is to set up co-operative housing schemes that actually work.” The Catholic Herald called it “a book for those who believe in the power of people to shape their own lives”.

=== Perestroika Christi ===
A thriller about the secret battle between the Kremlin and the Vatican for the soul of humankind, international best seller.

Norman Stone selected it as a Guardian Book of the Year, saying “I could not put it down. It is set in the crisscross world of the KGB and the Vatican, with scenes (extraordinarily prescient, it turns out) of Ukrainian nationalism: an elaborately crafted plot leads to a surprise outcome.” George Bull in The Sunday Times called it a “fast moving first novel [that] explores the penultimate battle, fought with dastardly and Machiavellian brio...read this clever and vivid book.”, while Harriet Waugh in the Sunday Telegraph described it as “Genuinely scary, exciting, well plotted and nicely written.”

=== Darkness at Dawn ===
Prophetic espionage novel in which an amoral undercover agent is plunged into a crisis of loyalties when resurgent nationalism threatens war between Russia and Ukraine.

Michael Hartland in The Daily Telegraph said it “Hums with the realism of tomorrow's headlines and the suspense is as sharp as a scalpel”, while Mary Dejevsky, wrote in The Independent that “The suspense is sustained to the very last page." Vera Rich commented in The Tablet that “The author's artistry means that the book succeeds not only at the adventure tale level—gripping as the plot line is—but more profoundly... A moving, remarkable book”.

=== Brutal Fantasies ===
A CIA officer's quest for a terrorist confronts him with the truths of his own past, forcing him to choose between his own redemption and the most precious thing in his life.

Peter Millar in The Times rated it “Excellent. A psychological thriller about the compromised soul of the secret agent... The character of John Darcy is as convincing as any I have encountered in espionage fiction...Hands builds and holds a palpable sense of tension that has all the drama and intimacy of good theatre. The achingly tantalizing crawl towards the climax is a masterpiece of suspense.” The Editorial Review on Amazon.com said “A top CIA agent, John Darcy, quickly brought to life with the kind of details that only an artist would include, is forced to take independent action when a ghost from his own past combines with an act of horrific destruction.” Jonathan Kemp in The Catholic Herald commented “This book is not merely a thriller. It is a novel of great profundity... One of the best novels I have read for a very long time. It deserves not only to become a best seller on its own merits, but also because it will promote greater understanding of the best and worst of humanity.”
