= Murder of Joanna Parrish =

British murder case

Joanna Parrish
- Born: 30 July 1969; England
- Died: 16 or 17 May 1990 (aged 20); Auxerre, Burgundy, France
- Cause of death: Strangulation
- Body discovered: Yonne River, Auxerre, France
- Education: University of Leeds
- Occupation: Tutor

Joanna Marie Parrish (30 July 1969 – 16 or 17 May 1990) was a British tutor and language student from Newnham on Severn, Gloucestershire, England, who was murdered in the Burgundy region of France while working at a local school as part of her degree course in 1990. Parrish, a University of Leeds undergraduate who was studying French, disappeared on the night of 16–17 May after placing an advertisement in a local Burgundy newspaper offering private English lessons, and arranging to meet a man who it is believed contacted her with details of a potential student. Her naked body was found in the Yonne River in Monéteau a small town next to Auxerre the following day. She had been raped, beaten and strangled.

A major suspect in the case was Michel Fourniret, a convicted serial killer known as "The Beast of Ardennes," who detectives suspected because the murder had similarities to crimes he was convicted of in 2008. Fourniret's wife, Monique Olivier, also gave police several statements linking him to Parrish's death, but she later withdrew the allegations, claiming they had been made under duress. The case was closed in 2011, but re-opened the following year after the emergence of fresh evidence. In February 2018, it was announced that Fourniret had confessed to Parrish's murder, but Fourniret died before he could stand trial.

In 2023, it was announced that prosecutors had charged Olivier with involvement in Parrish's murder. She was convicted of the crime in December and sentenced to life imprisonment.

== Background and death ==
Joanna Marie Parrish was born on 30 July 1969 to Pauline Murrell and Roger Parrish. She spent many of her formative years in the Gloucestershire village of Newnham on Severn, and was a student at Ribston Hall High School in nearby Gloucester. She attended the University of Leeds to study for a four-year degree in French, a sandwich course that required her to undertake a work placement during the third year. At the time of her death in May 1990, she was teaching English as an assistant at the Lycée Jacques Amyot in Auxerre, and had been due to finish a week after her disappearance. Her parents had planned to visit her in France to take home her belongings, while Parrish herself would travel on to Czechoslovakia to join her boyfriend, a fellow Leeds student who had also been working overseas.

To supplement her income during her stay in Auxerre, Parrish had advertised her services as a teacher in a local newspaper, offering private English lessons. According to a flatmate, she had been contacted by a man asking her to teach his son. She arranged to meet the caller outside the Banque Populaire in Auxerre at 7:00 p.m. on 16 May 1990, but did not return home from the appointment. Her naked body was found the following day in the River Yonne, three miles outside the town. She had been raped, beaten and strangled.

== Investigation ==
A key suspect in the investigation was Michel Fourniret, convicted in 2008 of the murders of seven girls and young women in France and Belgium between 1987 and 2001— crimes that earned him the nickname "The Beast of Ardennes"— and he was declared an official suspect. The crime had similarities to his modus operandi. In particular, Parrish had died in similar circumstances to a number of Fourniret's victims, having been raped and strangled, and there were puncture marks on her body similar in appearance to puncture marks found on some of the others who had been killed.

The theory that Fourniret was responsible gained added strength when his wife claimed to have witnessed her husband kill a young woman in Auxerre before dumping her body into the river. Olivier was convicted as an accomplice to the murders after helping her husband to procure victims by offering them a lift. She later retracted her statements, saying they had been given under duress.

In the wake of Fourniret's conviction, DNA evidence collected at the Parrish crime scene was taken to a specialist laboratory for examination. At a meeting with French investigators in June 2009, Parrish's father, Roger, was informed that it had been mislaid. He expressed his disappointment at the loss of the samples: "It is not completely the end of the line but the biggest chance has slipped through our grasp." In May 2010, it was confirmed that examining magistrates had completed their evaluation of evidence, and decided there was not enough to put Fourniret on trial. The case was formally closed the following year, after prosecutors ruled there was "no case to answer" against Fourniret.

Parrish's family expressed their frustration at the decision by French authorities, particularly as in France, charges cannot be brought against a suspect if a murder case remains inactive for ten years. Parrish's mother, Pauline Murrell, wrote Olivier a letter calling on her to tell the truth.

== Fresh inquiries ==
In June 2012, judges at the Paris appeals court decided to reopen the investigation after the emergence of fresh evidence identifying a new suspect described as "a man with a serious criminal record". A former girlfriend of the individual, known as "TV", told police of an evening on which she recalled seeing the suspect return home "with scratch marks on his face" and "a jean bag looking similar to Miss Parrish's." It was never made clear whether the incident occurred on the same date as the murder.

== Confession ==
On 16 February 2018, the lawyer for the Parrish family, Didier Seban, told news organisations that Fourniret had repeatedly confessed before a judge to the murder. However, Fourniret died before he could be prosecuted for the murder.

== Legal proceedings ==
In May 2023, French authorities indicted Olivier on charges of being involved in the murders of Parrish, Estelle Mouzin and another woman named Marie-Angele Domece. She stood trial for the crimes in November 2023. On 19 December 2023, Olivier was convicted of playing a part in the rape and murder of Parrish and Doemece, and helping to kidnap Mouzin, and was sentenced to life imprisonment.

== See also ==
- List of kidnappings (1990–1999)
- The case of the missing women of the Yonne
