= Hartland =

Hartland may refer to:

== Places ==
=== Canada ===
- Hartland, New Brunswick

=== United Kingdom ===
- Hartland, Devon
- Hartland Point, a headland of Devon

=== United States ===
- Hartland, California
- Hartland, Connecticut
- Hartland (Lexington, Kentucky), listed on the National Register of Historic Places in Fayette County, Kentucky
- Hartland, Illinois
- Hartland, Maine
  - Hartland (CDP), Maine, a census-designated place in the town of Hartland, Maine
- Hartland, Michigan
- Hartland, Minnesota
- Hartland, North Dakota
- Hartland, New York
- Hartland, Vermont
- Hartland (Lewisburg, West Virginia), a historic home
- Hartland, Wisconsin, in Waukesha County
- Hartland, Pierce County, Wisconsin
- Hartland, Shawano County, Wisconsin

== People ==
- Hartland (given name)
- Hartland (surname)
- Baron Hartland, in the Peerage of Ireland

== Other uses ==
- Hartland Institute, in Rapidan, Virginia
- Hartland Railroad Depot, in Hartland, Wisconsin

== See also ==
- Hartland Township (disambiguation)
- Heartland (disambiguation)
