= Ballintemple =

Suburb of Cork, Ireland

Ballintemple Baile an Teampaill
- Village
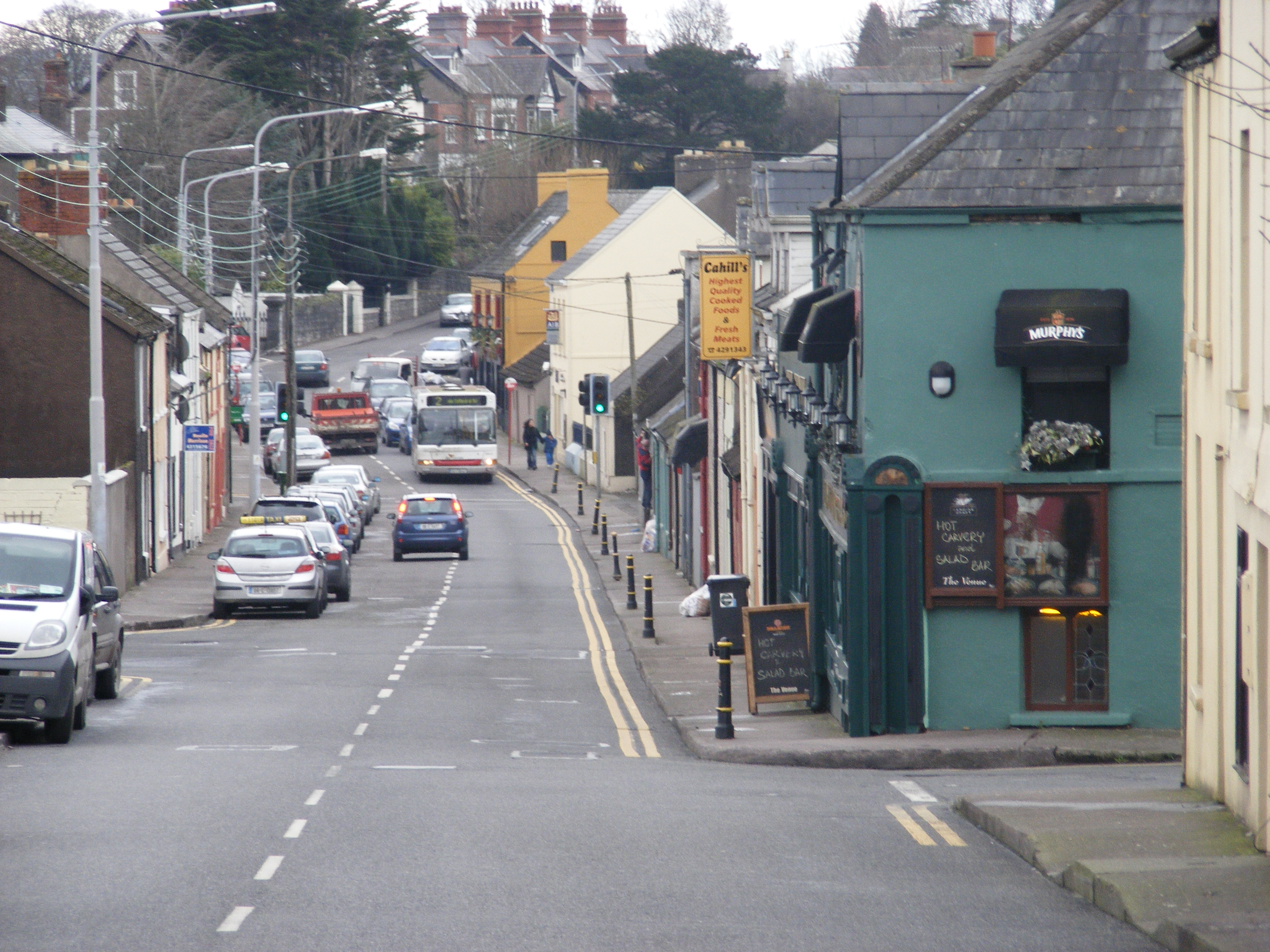
- Ballintemple village

- Location in Ireland
- Coordinates: 51.8954°N 8.4343°W
- Country: Ireland
- Province: Munster
- County: County Cork
- Time zone: UTC+0 (WET)
  - Summer (DST): UTC-1 (IST (WEST))

Ballintemple (Irish: Baile an Teampaill, meaning 'town of the church') is a suburb of Cork city, Ireland. The village is situated on the east side of the city with its limits extending to the River Lee and the village of Blackrock further to the east. Originally, Ballintemple was a separate village but today it has been enclosed by the city.

== History ==
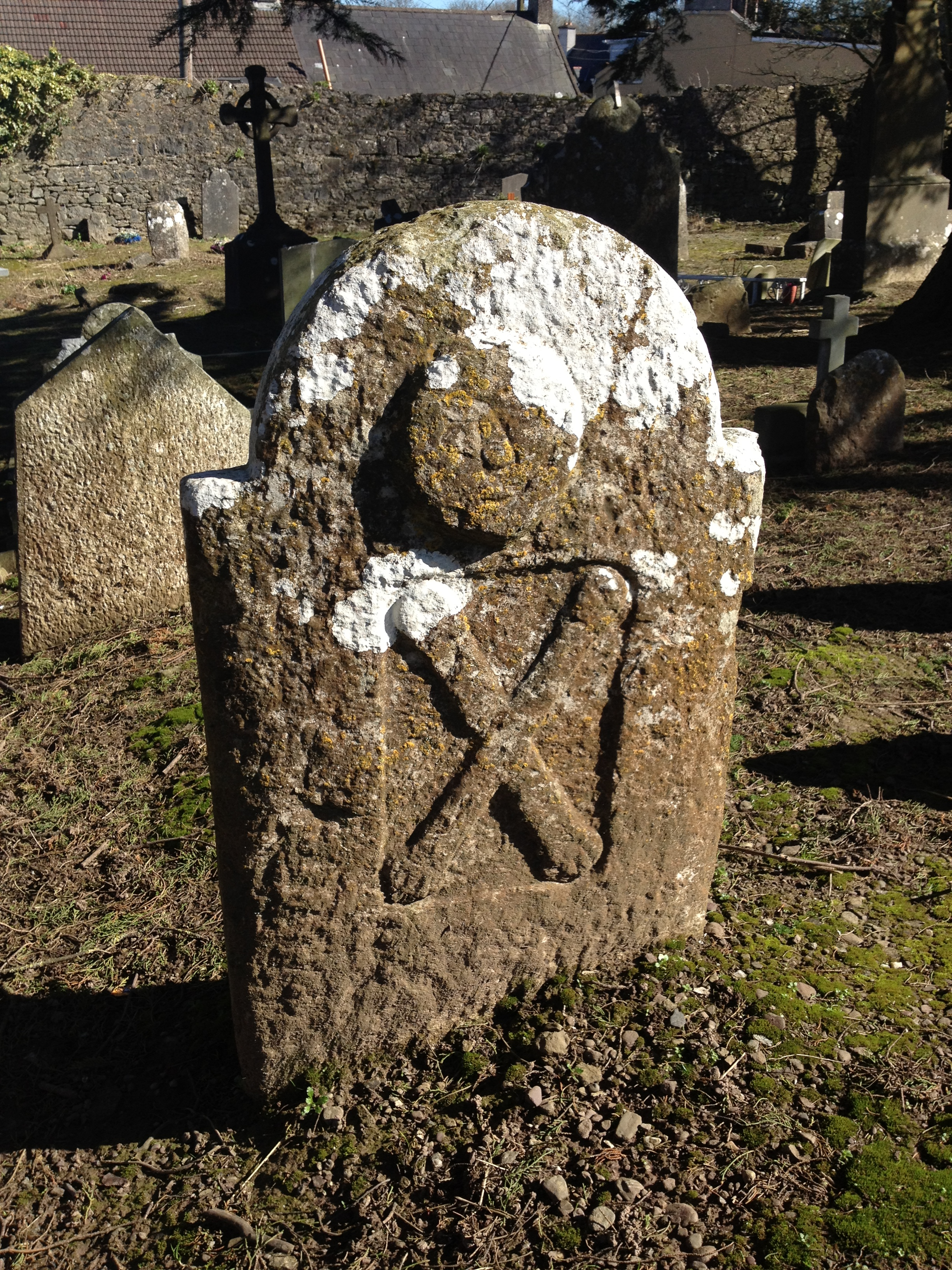
Grave marker in Temple Hill burial ground

Temple Hill, Churchyard Lane, and Ballintemple itself derive their names from an ecclesiastical and burial site at the top of Temple Hill. While some historical texts suggest that this graveyard was sited at an early medieval church of the Knights Templar, this is not supported by other texts, and modern historians assert that this association is incorrect. The name may denote land belonging to the church as opposed to the site of a church building. Whatever the case, while the graveyard remains, no archaeological evidence of an adjoining church has been subject to modern survey. The graveyard itself has been surveyed, and while it may have been used in the early mediaeval period, the earliest recorded burial event was that of the entrails of Henry FitzRoy, 1st Duke of Grafton who was killed in the 1690 Siege of Cork and whose intestines were removed and buried here to preserve the body prior to transport back to England. The earliest remaining extant burial markers (with discernable dates) are dated to the early 18th century. The antiquary and folklorist Thomas Crofton Croker surveyed the graveyard in the early 19th century. He recorded a folksong relating to the graveyard as well as documenting a marker for an 18th-century burial of a Lieutenant Henry Richard Temple who died with his young wife during a journey from the Caribbean (via Ireland) to England. During one such survey in the early 1800s, Croker was chased by locals who mistook his survey for grave robbery. The graveyard is accessible but closed to new burials (save to a few families with existing burial rights).

Other memorial markers in Ballintemple include the McCarthy Monument (constructed in the 19th century at Diamond Hill to honour ex-MP Alexander McCarthy), and a plaque at the junction of Ardfoyle and Blackrock road (commemorating the 1798 hanging in Ballintemple of an accused United Irishman).

The ruins of Dundanion Castle lie close to Páirc Uí Chaoimh by the River Lee. William Penn, the founder of the state of Pennsylvania, is said to have departed from here on his journey to the United States in 1682. Some time earlier, Sir Walter Raleigh is reported to have spent some time here before setting off on his final voyage to the West Indies in August 1617.

George Boole, the mathematician and inventor of Boolean algebra, lived in Ballintemple during the nineteenth century whilst professor at University College Cork. He died in December 1864, after catching pneumonia as the result of a rain storm whilst walking the four miles between his house and the university to give a lecture.

The old, abandoned Beaumont Quarry lies adjacent to Páirc Uí Rinn and Temple Hill. In its time, it provided limestone blocks for some of the notable buildings of Cork City. Prior to the expansion of Cork's suburbs in the 20th century, Ballintemple (as with nearby Ballinlough and Flower Lodge) was also home to a number of market gardens and nurseries - such as that of William Baylor Hartland.

== Amenities ==
The Blackrock Road runs through the heart of the village which has a post office, some small shops, and two public houses – The Venue and The Temple Inn (known locally as Longboats). The Lavanagh Centre is also located in the village, and offers services to the physically disabled - including physical therapy in its swimming pool.

== Stadia and events ==
Páirc Uí Rinn and Páirc Uí Chaoimh, both owned by the Gaelic Athletic Association, are based in the area. These are used by various Cork GAA teams and clubs for hurling and Gaelic football matches, and contribute to congestion in the area on match-days and when used for special events. Also close by to Temple Hill are the grounds of Cork Constitution Football Club.

On the eastern side of Páirc Uí Chaoimh is the Atlantic Pond, which was built as part of the scheme to drain the marshy area next to the River Lee and which is now used by walkers and runners. The showgrounds of the Munster Agricultural Society also adjoin Páirc Uí Chaoimh and prior to 2012 were used for occasional agricultural exhibitions. Cork City Council proposed a broad redevelopment of the showgrounds, Páirc Uí Chaoimh and Atlantic Pond areas, under a master plan for the "Marina Park" area. The proposed development included considerable changes to Páirc Uí Chaoimh, which were completed during 2017, with additional works to follow.

== Transport ==
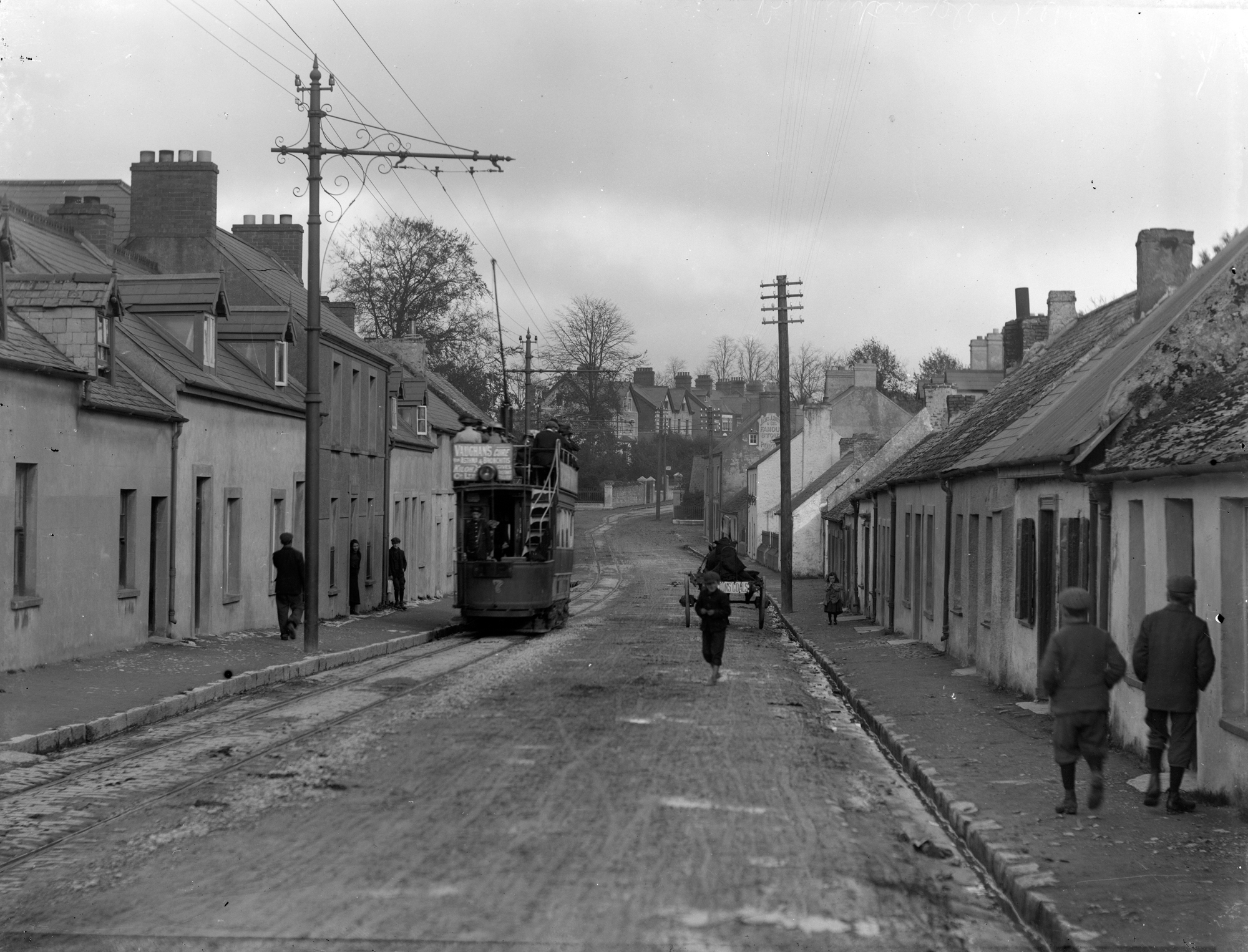
An open top tram in Ballintemple with a Cork Electric Tramways and Lighting Company service (c.1910)

Ballintemple is served by two city bus routes, numbers 202, which runs from Mahon, through Blackrock, Ballintemple, Cork City Centre, to Gurranabraher and Knocknaheeny, and 212, which runs from Kent Station Cork to Mahon Point Shopping Centre via Blackrock, Ballintemple and Monahan Road.

The nearest currently active railway station is Kent Station Cork. However, from 1850 to 1932, the line of the Cork, Blackrock and Passage Railway ran just north of the village centre. From 1880 to 1932, there was a station along this stretch of line called the Show Ground Halt railway station, and this served Ballintemple.

The area was also previously served by trams.

== Notable residents ==
- George Boole, mathematician and logician
- Mary Elmes, humanitarian activist
- William Baylor Hartland, horticulturist
- Maurice Healy, politician, lawyer and Member of Parliament
- Cillian Murphy, film and stage actor
- Alison Oliver, actress
- Ethel Voynich, author
- Simon Zebo, professional rugby player

== See also ==
- List of towns and villages in Ireland
