= Émile Louis =

French serial killer (1934–2013)

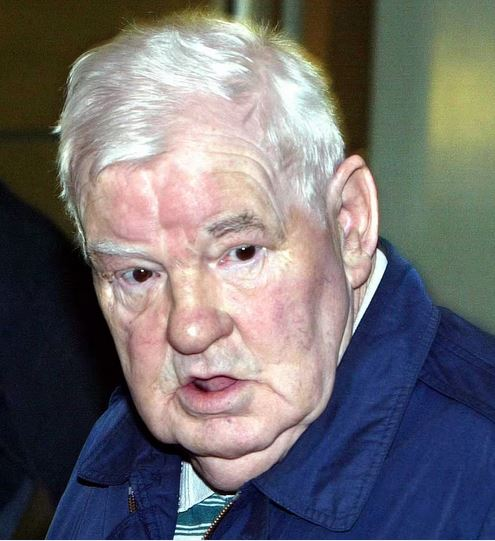
Émile Louis in 2004.

Émile Louis (21 January 1934 – 20 October 2013) was a French serial killer and former bus driver and the prime suspect in the disappearance of seven young women in the Yonne department, Burgundy, in the late 1970s. He confessed to their murders in 2000, but retracted this confession one month later. Louis was sentenced to life in prison by the cour d'assises of Yonne in 2004. The sentence, which was upheld on appeal in 2006, was confirmed by the Court of Cassation in 2007.

== Disappearances ==
Louis was a prime suspect in the disappearances in the Yonne Département of seven young women with mild mental deficiencies between 1975 and 1980. The disappearances initially did not attract much attention, as the girls had no close relatives and lived in homes for the disabled; it was assumed that they had simply run away. A local detective, Christian Jambert, looked into the possible crimes as early as 1981. However, his reports were ignored.

After a long depression following this episode, Jambert committed suicide by gunshot in 1997. Because of two different impacts on Jambert's skull, police doubted the suicide thesis at first. After investigations, it appeared that Jambert's carbine was modified to shoot in burst mode, and might have caused several skull wounds. The suicide thesis was then confirmed by Justice on several occasions.

In 1992, Pierre Charrier, the head of the Yonne APAJH association managing the home for disabled young people where the missing girls had been staying, was sentenced to six years in prison for raping a 23-year-old disabled woman.

In 2000, Louis confessed to two of the murders, and gave information as to where the bodies could be found, which police were able to use to recover the bodies from shallow graves. He later retracted his confession, but was convicted of the seven murders in November 2004, and sentenced to life in prison.

== Death ==
Louis died on 20 October 2013. In the newspaper it was mentioned that he died in a secure hospital aged 79.

== See also ==
- List of French serial killers
- The case of the missing women of the Yonne
