= Hartland (given name) =

Hartland is a masculine given name. Notable people with the given name Hartland include:

- Hartland MacDougall (1876–1947), Canadian ice hockey player and businessman
- Hartland Molson (1907–2002), Anglo-Quebecer businessman and military aviator
- Hartland Monahan (1951–2023), Canadian ice hockey player
- Hartland Snyder (1913–1962), American physicist

== See also ==
- Hartland
- Hartland (surname)
