= Ribston Hall High School =

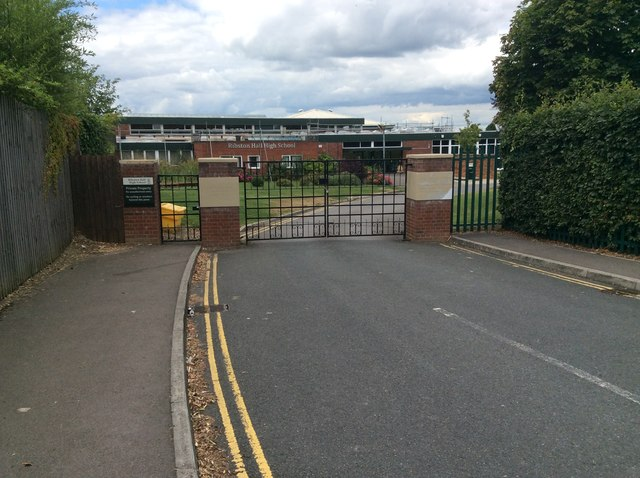

Location
- Stroud Road; Gloucester, Gloucestershire, GL1 5LE; England; 51°50′46″N 02°14′37″W

Information
- Type: Grammar, Academy
- Established: 1921
- Local authority: Gloucestershire
- Specialist: Humanities & Sports
- Department for Education URN: 136767 Tables
- Ofsted: Reports
- Head teacher: Alec Waters
- Gender: Girls (mixed in Sixth Form)
- Age: 11 to 18
- Enrollment: 819
- Website: http://www.ribstonhall.gloucs.sch.uk

Ribston Hall High School is a selective grammar school with academy status in Gloucester, England, for girls between the ages of 11 and 18. It was founded in 1921.

== Admissions ==
It also has a sixth form for both girls and boys. It is situated south of Gloucester city centre on Stroud Road (B4072), between Linden and Tredworth, a few hundred metres west of the Cross Country Route.

== History ==
It was known as High School for Girls, Ribston Hall. In 1886 Ribston Hall was known as The Ladies' College.

=== 1963 aircraft incident ===
On the morning of March 27 1963, Vickers Varsity G-APAZ crashed on top of a house near to the school in Tuffley. The twin-engined aircraft narrowly missed the school, by only feet. Both pilots were killed. Girls in the hockey field saw the aircraft approaching at a low level.

- 26 year old Kelston Thomas of Bristol, who was to marry 23 year old Margaret Clements of Failand on Saturday March 31 1963; he was living at Charlton Kings
- 38 year old Russell Palmer of Up Hatherley, a former wartime bomber pilot. He was found strapped in his seat.

=== Funding ===
It became a grant maintained school in April 1990.

== Houses ==
Students are divided into five houses: Britons, Celts, Danes, Saxons and Romans.

== Notable former pupils ==
- Christina Baily, actress as Dannii Carbone in Hollyoaks
- Ethel Mary Hartland, magistrate and activist
- Mary-Jess Leaverland, won the 2010 Chinese Jiangsu province equivalent of The X Factor.
- Joanna Parrish, murdered in May 1990 in Auxerre, Burgundy whilst studying French at the University of Leeds
- Beth Rodford, GB Olympic rower
- Daphne Skillern, female police Commander at Scotland Yard
- Nathan Sykes, member of boy band The Wanted and singer songwriter solo artist,
