= Camp de Châlons =

Military base in Mourmelon-le-Grand, France

Coordinates: 49°7′27″N 4°22′43″E

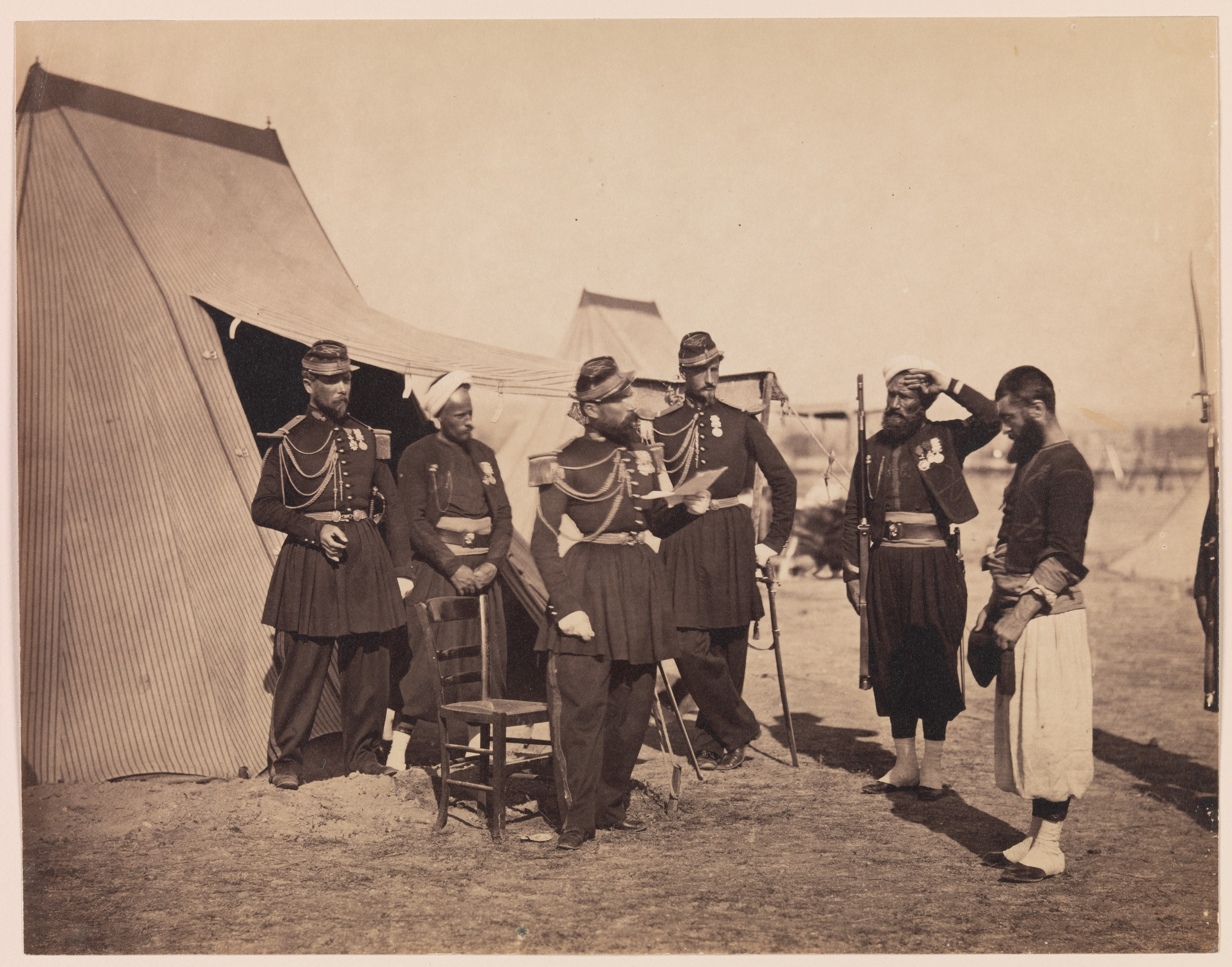
The quarters of the Zouaves of the Imperial Guard at Camp de Châlons by Gustave Le Gray, 1857

The camp de Châlons, also known as camp de Mourmelon, is a military camp of about 10,000 hectares (24,710 acres) at Mourmelon-le-Grand, near Châlons-en-Champagne. It was created at the behest of Napoleon III and opened August 30, 1857 during the Second French Empire.

The initial purpose was simply for practising military manoeuvres, but it quickly turned into a showcase of the French Imperial Army, a theatrical propaganda display, where French citizens could meet the army and watch parades. Each year the camp was transformed into a town of tents and wooden chalets.

The camp survived the fall of the Second Empire in 1872, but changed into a training camp and a departure point for troops engaging in overseas operations.

The camp is used for military manoeuvres, and cavalry training, along with the neighbouring 2,500 hectare large Camp de Moronvilliers. Firing of live ordnance (rockets, missiles) is prohibited.

== Mourmelon 131 military airbase ==
A military airbase, designated base aérienne 131 Mourmelon, was in operation near the camp from the beginning of the 1900s until 1965, when it was shut down. This site also hosted a flying school, founded by Henri Farman in 1909.

== The Paris 1924 Summer Olympics ==
The camp was selected to host the individual and team 600 m free rifle shooting events for the 1924 Summer Olympics in neighbouring Paris. To that purpose, temporary facilities were constructed on and near the camp's firing range.

== Other history ==
On 4 August 1988, the dead body of 20-year-old Fabienne Leroy was found at the camp after she was kidnapped from a supermarket in nearby Châlons-en-Champagne and shot the previous day. In May 2008, Michel Fourniret and Monique Olivier were convicted of the murder of Leroy and six other girls and women and sentenced to life imprisonment.
