= Murder of Estelle Mouzin =

French criminal case (2003–2020)

Estelle Mouzin
- Born: 29 June 1993; Guermantes, France
- Died: after 9 January 2003 (aged 9); Guermantes, France
- Known for: Disappearance and supposed murder

The Estelle Mouzin case is a French criminal case which began on 9 January 2003 with the disappearance of Estelle Mouzin in the city of Guermantes in France. Estelle Mouzin was a nine-year-old girl who was returning from school when she disappeared.

For a long time, this disappearance was not solved and the investigation remained at a standstill. But sixteen and a half years later, on 27 November 2019, Michel Fourniret, a pedophile serial killer already sentenced to life imprisonment, became the main suspect: he was indicted for "kidnapping and false imprisonment followed by death". Then, on 24 January 2020, Monique Olivier, his former wife, claimed that he had indeed killed Estelle Mouzin; finally, on 6 March 2020, this claim was confirmed with Michel Fourniret's confession. Fourniret died before he could be prosecuted, but Olivier was convicted of helping him to kidnap Mouzin and sentenced to life imprisonment.

Each year, a march is organised in memory of Estelle Mouzin. Her body has not been found.

== Disappearance ==
On Thursday 9 January 2003, Estelle Mouzin, a nine-year-old girl, disappeared on the way back from school in Guermantes. She was seen for the last time in front of a bakery, while she was returning to the house of her mother, Suzanne Mouzin, who was in the process of divorcing the girl's father, Eric Mouzin. Her mother reported the fact she was missing to the local police station shortly after 7:00 p.m. Her disappearance sparked huge media coverage all over the country.

== Investigations ==
=== First suspect ===
The first person to be suspected was serial killer Michel Fourniret, who was arrested in June 2003 in Belgium. However, after consideration, the police discounted Fourniret because he seemed to have an alibi — namely, a phone call was made from his home at the time of Estelle Mouzin's disappearance.

Two weeks before Mouzin's disappearance, a girl of the same age was almost kidnapped by a man in a white van, from which she was able to make a facial composite. When Fourniret was suspected, investigators showed his photo to the girl, who said it wasn't him who tried to kidnap her. While taking the police to a place he buried one of his victims, Fourniret described the clothes his victim was wearing, and it was very close to those Mouzin wore the day she disappeared.

Despite Fourniret's "alibi" and denial of any involvement, Fourniret became a suspect again when the police found at his home a video recording and photos of the girl on his computer. However, in 2007 the police abandoned pursuit of the case against Fourniret, citing his "alibi" and the lack of sufficient supporting evidence.

The scope of the inquiry, led by the Commissioner Jean-Marc Bloch, was unprecedented; more than 130 persons were interrogated by the police and all the houses of the city were searched.

=== 2008 investigations ===
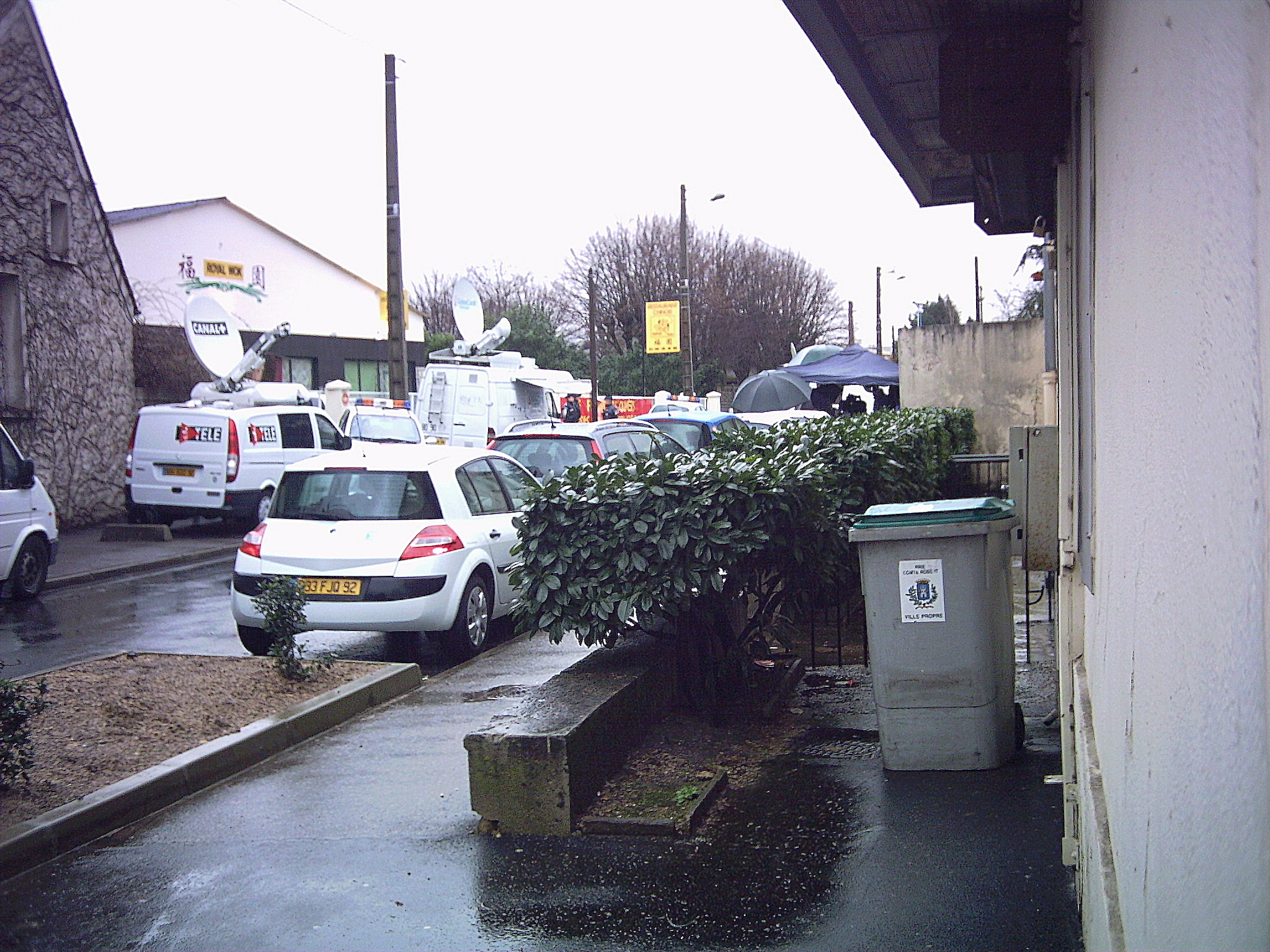
Brie-Comte-Robert, 1 February 2008 — the investigation received widespread media coverage

Further arrests took place on Thursday 31 January 2008 in the cities of Brie-Comte-Robert and Lognes (Seine-et-Marne). The Royal Wok restaurant in Brie-Comte-Robert was searched, after suspicion that human remains might be found. On 1 February, this theory proved groundless as only animal remains were uncovered at the restaurant.

=== 2009 onward investigations ===
In 2010, the French authorities launched a new call for witnesses by disseminating a computer-aged portrait of Estelle Mouzin. Ten years later, in March 2020, Michel Fourniret confessed to having killed Mouzin.

=== 2020 investigations ===
Excavations were planned in 2020 at two sites in the Ardennes.

On 23 January 2020, Michel Fourniret, in front of judge Sabine Khéris, asserted that his memory "got the better of him", but that he had to be "considered guilty" of Estelle Mouzin's disappearance. "I urge you to treat me as guilty," Michel Fourniret said. In order to verify whether his confession held true, Monique Olivier, Fourniret's ex-wife, had to be re-interrogated. According to Olivier, Fourniret was the man responsible for the kidnapping and murder of Estelle Mouzin.

On 24 January 2020, Olivier confirmed to the investigating judge Sabine Khéris that it was indeed her (and not Fourniret) who had phoned the home of Michel Fourniret's son on 9 January 2003, the day of the girl's disappearance, and that the girl presented the profile her husband was looking for. She added that Michel Fourniret had made reconnaissance sightings in the days preceding the abduction, and that one evening he returned from his hunt stating that he had spotted "a beautiful little target".

On 21 August 2020, the lawyer of Olivier declared that his client had been indicted for "complicity" and affirmed that her ex-husband Michel Fourniret had kidnapped Estelle Mouzin on 9 January 2003 and took her to Ville-sur-Lumes in the Ardennes, “to sequester her” and “that he had raped and strangled her”. Partial DNA traces of Estelle Mouzin were found on a mattress in the former house of Fourniret's sister. Fourniret died in 2021 before he could stand trial.

== Criminal charges ==
In May 2023, French authorities sought to indict Olivier on charges of being involved in Mouzin's kidnapping and the murders of Joanna Parrish and another woman named Marie-Angele Domece. Her trial was scheduled for November 2023.

During her trial, Olivier admitted watching over Mouzin while Fourniret was at work and apologised, saying that she regretted not saving Mouzin. She was convicted on all charges in December and sentenced to life imprisonment.

== See also ==
- List of solved missing person cases (post-2000)

== Notes and references ==
=== Bibliography ===
- Christian English & Frédéric Thibaud, Affaires non classées, tome II (chapitre : la disparition d'Estelle Mouzin), First édition, 15 juin 2004, 294 pages, ISBN 2876919095
- Éric Mouzin (Estelle Mouzin's father) & Véronique de Bure, Retrouver Estelle (éditions Stock, 5 janvier 2011), 180 pages ISBN 978-2234063488

=== Documentaries ===
==== France ====
- « Avis de recherche », 2003, Envoyé spécial, France 2.
- « La disparition d'Estelle Mouzin », 2003, Secrets d'actualité, M6.
- « Estelle : entre enquête et oubli », 2006, Complément d'enquête, France 2.
- « Disparition d'Estelle : mystère à Guermantes », 4 March 2009, Enquêtes criminelles : le magazine des faits divers, W9.
- « Estelle Mouzin : les mystères d'une disparition », 31 March 2010, 90' faits divers, TMC.
- « Disparition d'Estelle : le combat d'une famille », June 2011, TMC.
- « Affaire Estelle Mouzin », 6 January 2012, Non élucidé, France 2.
- « Estelle Mouzin - l'enquête », 9 February 2013, Les Faits Karl Zero, 13^{e} Rue.
- « Affaire Estelle Mouzin : 10 ans de mystère », 26 October 2013, Chroniques criminelles, NT1.

==== Belgium ====
- « Estelle Mouzin : les nouvelles pistes », 29 May 2013, Devoir d'enquête, la Une & RTBF.
