= Clays Lane Estate =

Housing estate in Stratford, London, England

- Logo of the former Clays Lane Housing Cooperative, with the motto "neighbourhood, shelter, community, friendship"
- Interactive map of Clays Lane Estate

General information
- Location: Stratford, London
- Coordinates: 51.549659°N 0.010767°W

Construction
- Constructed: 1977

Listing
- Demolished: 2007

Other information
- Governing body: Clays Lane Housing Cooperative

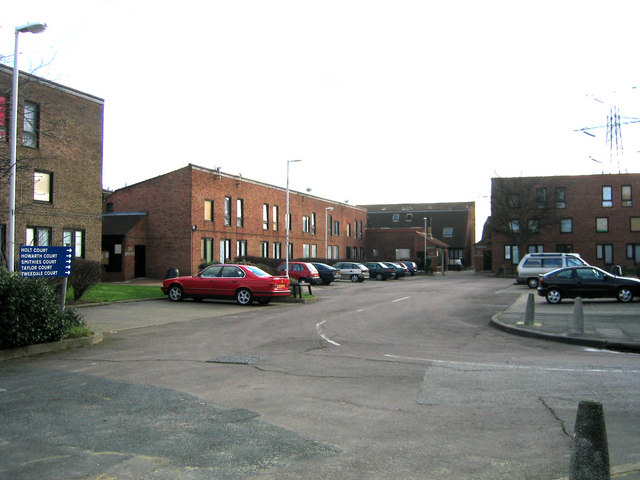
A residential court in Clays Lane Estate showing several of the shared houses

The Clays Lane Estate was a housing estate in Stratford, east London, and the UK’s largest (and Europe's second largest) purpose built housing cooperative. It was an experiment in building close-knit communities as a way of helping vulnerable single people. It became the subject of significant controversy when it was demolished to make way for the site of the London 2012 Olympic games.

== Creation and organisation ==
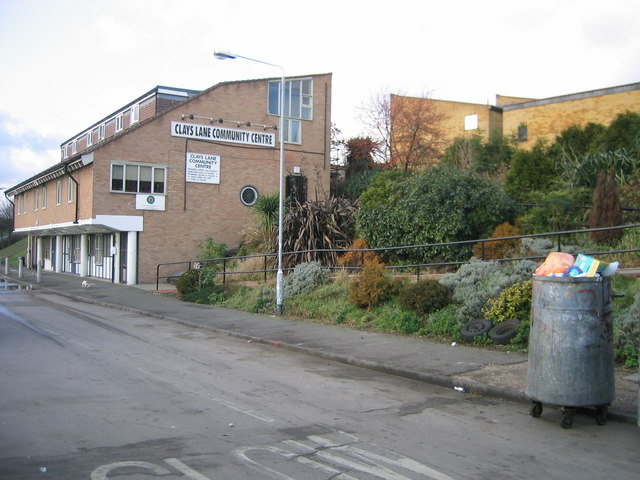
The 1982 Clays Lane Community Centre, shown in 2007 shortly before demolition

Clays Lane Housing Co-operative was a fully mutual housing co-operative, established to address the lack of housing for vulnerable single people in the east of London. It was initially funded by organisations including Newham London Borough Council and the University of East London. There were up to 500 contractual tenants at the beginning, 450 after the flats were voted eligible for single person occupancy, who had to be single people aged between 18 and 59. Tenants were required to purchase a £1 share in order to become a member of the co-operative, which entitled them to attend and vote in the annual general meeting, to elect or stand for the management committee, participate in the co-operative’s affairs and receive its services.

== Inclusive architecture & design ==
The Clays Lane estate consisted of an enclave of 57 shared houses in red or yellow brick (containing four, six or ten bedrooms) and 40 self-contained flats and 10 self-contained bungalows, all purpose built in 1977. The estate was set on a small artificial hill, to provide views, protect the estate from flooding, and (potentially) shield it from hazards of waste dumped underneath. A community centre (complete with shop, café, function hall, and training room), which also housed the housing office, was added in 1982. All of the co-operative's properties were located on one site in the London Borough of Newham, on the top of a small hill next to the Eastway Cycle Circuit (which had previously been the site of an old landfill site, the West Ham Tip). This provided views across Hackney Marshes and the Lee Valley.

The estate was designed to engender a strong local community, and was frequently used to help people make re-entry into social life - its motto was "A community - not just a housing estate". The housing was arranged in ten courtyards, each of which held a monthly meeting to discuss issues that may have arisen, hear back from committee representatives (each courtyard elected a member to the management committee), find out the latest news and generally catch up with each other. The estate also had its own sports teams and program of activities and training.

== Loss of Cooperative status ==
The Housing Corporation instigated a standard (statutory) inquiry into the affairs of the Clays Lane Co-operative in 2000, and subsequently received a report of poor management of the Co-operative's affairs from the Audit Commission.The report was the result of an Audit Commission Inspection and which resulted in the Co-op receiving a judgement of zero stars and poor prospects for improvement. Under the Audit Commission inspection regime, this was the minimum, base, and worst possible, result for any housing provider. One of the report's most worrying findings was that the Co-op had no written Allocations Policy, which meant that it was not clear how people secured a place there or who was actually living there. It proposed that the Co-operative’s housing stock be transferred to the Peabody Trust, one of the UK’s largest housing associations, because of its better financial security, and the Government approved the transfer.

The Clays Lane Co-operative appealed the order, because as the Peabody Trust was not a co-operative they would lose their mutual status if the transfer were to go ahead. They proposed an alternative, whereby the homes be transferred to Tenants First, a mutual housing co-operative based in Scotland. The Housing Corporation rejected this alternative and again directed transfer to the Peabody Trust.

The cooperative called for a judicial review of the decision, but this was refused, with the court ruling in June 2003 that the housing should be sold to the Peabody Trust. In August 2005 the estate was statutorily transferred to the Peabody Trust, and was subsequently managed by Waltham Forest Community Based Housing Association.

== Impact of London 2012 Olympics ==
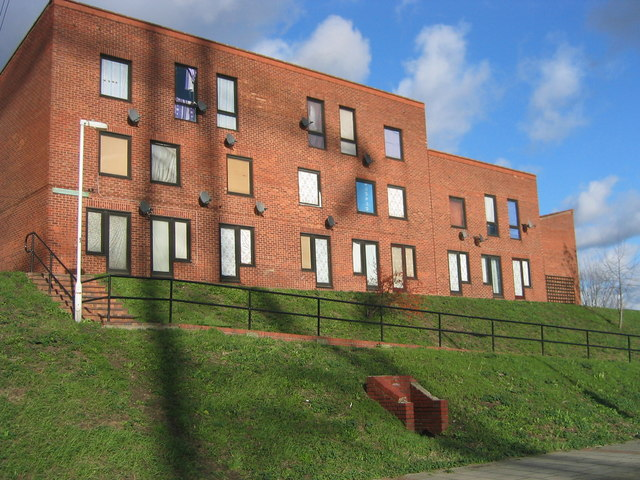
A block of flats on the estate in January 2007, showing several flats that had been 'boarded up' inside the window panes (sometimes with curtains left in place) in an attempt to preserve the appearance of the community for the remaining residents, as the estate was prepared for demolition

The entire estate was the subject of a compulsory purchase order by the London Development Agency to make way for Chobham Manor in the 2012 London Olympics Park: indeed almost all the inhabitants cleared from the Olympic site were students at the adjacent UEL halls of residence or Clays Lane residents.

Many residents were extremely vocal in their opposition of the compulsory purchase order, and several protests were held in nearby Stratford. A group of tenants gained leave to hold a public inquiry into the decision to compulsorily purchase the estate, which was held in August 2006. The decision to allow the compulsory purchase was appealed, however, the appeal was dismissed in a High Court ruling on 30 May 2007. All 430 residents of the Clay’s Lane Housing Cooperative were issued with orders to leave by July 2007.

Residents were promised equivalent, if not better, housing (as well as £8,500 for the loss of their homes and relocation expenses). However it was reported that early movers found this was not the case, and some feared that dispersal to sites across East London would mean the end of the unusually close community links in the estate. Surveys after the evictions found that residents particularly missed the communal areas, facilities and social life of the Clays Lane Estate, and often found their new accommodation anonymous.

There was further controversy when 11 'short life' tenants in the Peabody Nags Head estate were evicted to make way for residents displaced from Clays Lane.

== Demolition ==
Demolition of the estate, and of the small artificial hill that it sat on, began in September 2007. A report in The Guardian newspaper referred to several documents and surveys suggesting that Thorium isotope had been dumped on the site in 1959, and that a radiological survey of the area carried out by WS Atkins in 1993 had revealed "the presence of elevated levels of [radiation] activity above the general background level for that area". The Guardian report also referred to an internal memorandum written by the Lee Valley Regional Park Authority valuer and estates surveyor in 1972, that recommended that the ground over the waste should not be disturbed without further tests. Estate residents, concerned that dangerous materials might be extracted, had unsuccessfully tried to secure a court injunction to stop ground tests being carried out before they were rehoused.

No trace now remains of the estate, however the Museum of London holds a photographic record of the Clays Lane Estate and the adjacent travellers site, part of a project to document the site prior to its demolition.

== Mutual Housing Cooperatives in London ==
Although the housing cooperative model never developed extensively in London, some housing cooperatives were trialled at around the same time as Clays Lane, with similar aims and organisations.

The Fairhazel Housing Co-Operative, the first mutual housing co-op to be incorporated under the modern legalisation, acquired 121 flats in 26 buildings, then in a dilapidated state, most of them older 'mansion flats' off the Finchley Road in West Hampstead. It undertook a multi-million pound investment, funded by the Housing Corporation, and continues to operate.

A newbuild mutual housing co-operative with 40 flats and 20 shared houses was created at the Thamesmead Housing Co-operative, but it was dissolved in the 1990s. In Deptford the Deptford Housing Co-operative - built in 1978 with 138 residences continues to operate as does the nearby Sanford Housing Co-operative - built in 1973 with 146 residences - still operate as a housing cooperatives. Ekarro Housing Co-operative in Stockwell is a smaller co-op owning older property and a converted former church with a minority of properties held on a shared-ownership basis.

== Sources ==
- Housing Corporation Press release: Housing Corporation announces Clays Lane transfer
- UK Housing Clays lane stock to transfer to the Peabody Trust
- Games Monitor A peer gets confused about Clays Lane
- Games Monitor Clays Lane Housing Co-op, Residents Survey Report for the London Development Agency, April 2005
- Spectacle Catalogue Olympic Stories. Clays Lane-2006
- Newham sports Reference to the Clays Lane Community Football scheme
- Irwin Mitchell solicitors on the Clays Lane eviction case
- East End Howler Article on page 2: LDA London Destruction Agency
- They Work For You Olympic Games 2012: Housing
