= Yonne disappearances =

Criminal case in France

The Yonne disappearances (French: Affaire des disparues de l'Yonne) is a French criminal case involving the abduction and murder of at least eight women and girls between 1975 and the 2000s around Auxerre, in the Yonne department. The numerous failures of the justice system and the child protection system have made it one of the most well-known cases in France. The minister of justice at the time, Marylise Lebranchu, stated in 2002 that "the Yonne case is indeed a series of errors and malfunctions.

Despite the disappearance of several young women and teenage girls in the late 1970s, housed in DDASS homes, few people were concerned as their families were not very present and did not have the means to publicize the case. Also the homes did not report the disappearances to the authorities, having concluded that it was a case of a runaway despite the victims' limited autonomy.

After more than twenty years of unsolved disappearances, Pierre Monnoir and Jeannette Beaufumé spearheaded the media attention surrounding the case, appearing on the TF1 program "Perdu de vue" (Lost from Sight), which revived the investigation that had been repeatedly dismissed by the courts. Serial killer Émile Louis was arrested and imprisoned in 2000 following information he provided to investigators. He was sentenced to life imprisonment in 2004 for the murders of seven women and girls. A bus driver and town councilor in Seignelay, he had nevertheless been strongly suspected by a gendarme, Christian Jambert, in 1984, the subject of a report that was never acted upon. Émile Louis had received a first conviction in 1983 and another in 1989 in the Var region for indecent assault of a minor.

Several dozen disturbing disappearances remain unsolved around Auxerre, dating from 1965 to 1990. Other cases of pimping, kidnappings and murders in the department, as well as Émile Louis's statements about possible networks, leave doubt as to whether the case of the missing women and girls of the Yonne is truly closed.

== List of victims and missing persons ==
Murders acknowledged by Émile Louis:

- Françoise Lemoine, 27 years old, disappeared in March 1975
- Christine Marlot, 15 years old, disappeared on 23 January 1977
- Jacqueline Weis, 18 years old, disappeared on 4 April 1977
- Chantal Gras, 18 years old, disappeared on 21 April 1977
- Madeleine Dejust, 21 years old, disappeared in July 1977
- Bernadette Lemoine, 19 years old, disappeared in March 1978
- Martine Renault, 16 years old, disappeared in September 1979

Murders admitted by Michel Fourniret:

- Isabelle Laville, who disappeared on 11 December 1987.
- Marie-Angèle Domece, who disappeared on 8 July 1988.
- Joanna Parrish, found dead on 17 May 1990.

Murder admitted by Ulrich Muenstermann:

- Sylvie Bâton, killed on 5 May 1989.

Other unsolved disappearances in the Yonne.

- Lucette Evain, 21 years old, found dead on 9 February 1970.
- Marie-Jeanne Ambroisine Coussin, 40 years old, disappeared in 1975.
- Jeanine Parent-Vain, who disappeared in 1976.
- Elizabeth Fontaine, found dead on 19 January 1979.
- Sylviane Durand-Lesage, 22 years old, found dead on 5 July 1981.
- Smilja Stojanovic, found dead on 25 March 1984.
- Martine Menguy, who disappeared in 1986.
- Danièle Bernard, found dead on 6 July 1989.
- An unknown unidentified young woman who was found dead on 5 October 1997.
- An unidentified skeleton found in Joux-la-Ville, in 1998.

== Chronology ==
Between 1975 and 1979, several young girls disappeared without a trace in the Auxerre region. These girls, considered "under the care of the "DDASS" ( Departmental Directorate of Health and Social Affairs), were placed under the responsibility and protection of the state through the Aide sociale à l'enfance (child services) of the DDASS. They were taken into the care of the social services of the time because they were orphans or children removed from their families at birth to protect them from alcoholic and violent parents. Some suffered from mild intellectual disabilities.

Yet they disappear in general indifference or almost: no one is concerned about their disappearance, except for some people who took them in and sometimes the scattered members of their family when they had one.

In 1984, the gendarme Jambert submitted a report to the justice system on his suspicions. Due to a lack of evidence, it was not pursued, but the prosecutor nevertheless asked the investigator to continue his work.

In the 1980s, more young women disappeared or were murdered under mysterious circumstances in the area around Auxerre. The justice system closed several cases without finding the perpetrators.

In total, nearly twenty young women disappeared without a trace in the Yonne department.

It wasn't until 1996 that an association filed several complaints for kidnapping and unlawful confinement—not murder, since no body was ever found—nearly twenty years after the first known events. But the justice system refused to open proceedings because the statute of limitations had long since expired.

The victims' families association then decided to publicize the case, and the 1996 broadcast of the television program "Perdu de vue" (Lost from Sight) finally brought one of the worst French criminal cases to light. Viewers discovered that for twelve years, the gendarme Christian Jambert, had suspected a local bus driver, Émile Louis. In 1997, Jambert was found dead. It was officially ruled a suicide, although the autopsy report revealed several inconsistencies, notably the fact that two bullets, both described by the forensic doctors as fatal, were fired from different directions (the hypothesis adopted was that of a ricocheting bullet).

In December 2000, police went to Émile Louis's home in Draguignan, where he had recently moved. After assuring him that, due to the statute of limitations, he could speak about the missing girls of the Yonne region without getting into trouble, Louis confessed to the murder of seven young women in the 1970s. He led investigators to the bodies in the Auxerre area, but only two victims were ever found. Louis was then taken into custody, and when he realized he would ultimately have to pay for his crimes, he recanted and proclaimed his innocence, explaining that the disappearances were linked to a vast prostitution ring that was plaguing the department at the time.

Louis was sentenced to life imprisonment in 2004. In the late 1980s, he had been convicted for indecent assault on minors.

== Parallel businesses ==
Alongside the disappearances attributed to Émile Louis, other abductions of young girls, particularly those from the care of the Departmental Directorate of Health and Social Affairs (DDASS), took place in the Yonne department. The Dunand affair broke in 1983 when the Dunand couple were arrested in Appoigny, less than 10 km from where Émile Louis lived. They were the "enforcers" of a pimping, sadomasochism, and torture network, preying on young girls they abducted in the department. Most of the few direct and identified witnesses to the abuse died under mysterious circumstances. His clandestine release, six months after the high-profile imprisonment of Émile Louis, was noted. The similarities and connections between the two cases intrigued investigative journalists and victim support organizations.

The department has been the scene of many other cases of child murders and other serial killers like Michel Fourniret operated in the Yonne from the 1980s onwards.

== See also ==
- List of major crimes in France (before 2000)
- List of serial killers by country
- Mourmelon disappearances case
- Marc Dutroux
- Michel Fourniret

== Sources ==
=== Bibliography ===
- Corinne Herrmann; Philippe Jeanne (2001). Les Disparues d'Auxerre. L'enquête. Éditions Ramsay.
- Christian English; Frédéric Thibaud (2003). "Les sept disparues de l'Yonne". Affaires non classées. First édition. p. 334. ISBN 2876917661.
- Éric Raynaud (2004). Les Réseaux cachés des pervers sexuels : enquête sur les disparues de l'Yonne. éditions du Rocher.
- Hubert Besson (2004). Émile Louis et l'affaire des disparues de l'Yonne. l'Archipel.
- Jacques Pradel (2005). Disparues de l'Yonne - la 8^{e} victime. Éditions Michel Lafon. ISBN 2-7499-0227-4.
- Maryline Vinet (2005). Être la fille d'Émile Louis. ISBN 978-2840989172.
  Maryline Vinet est la fille ainée d'Émile Louis.
- Corinne Herrmann (2008). Un tueur peut en cacher un autre. Comment les serial killers passent à travers les mailles du filet. Éditions Stock.
- "L'affaire Émile Louis". 40 ans d'affaires Criminelles, 1969-2009. Pascal Michel. 2009. p. 39, 45. ISBN 978-1-4092-7263-2.
- Alain Fraitag; Alain Thuault (2011). Émile Louis innocent. La troublante hypothèse. Les avocats d'Émile Louis parlent. Éditions David Reinharc. ISBN 9782358690164.

=== Television documentaries ===
- "Mysterious disappearances" on 19 November 2000 in Faites entrer l'accusé presented by Christophe Hondelatte on France 2.
- “Émile Louis, the missing women of the Yonne” in August 2005, June 2007 and June 2009 in Faites entrer l'accusé presented by Christophe Hondelatte on France 2.
- "Disappearances of the Yonne: an investigation into the terrible hidden side of Émile Louis" - 23 September 2009 in 90' news item on TMC.
- “Émile Louis: The Case of the Missing Women of the Yonne” in Affaires criminelles on 27 December 2009 on NT1, then the 5 February 2011 throughout Toute l'Histoire
- "The Missing Women of the Yonne" (first report) on 26 October 2013 in Chroniques criminelles on NT1.
- “Émile Louis: The Butcher of the Yonne,” second report in the “Special: They Made France Tremble” series - 27 April 2015 in Crimes on NRJ 12.
- “Disappeared from the Yonne, the conspiracy of silence”, 2022-2024, documentary series in three seasons (of 8, 8 and 4 episodes) onFrance 3.

=== Radio broadcasts ===
- "The Complete Story: Émile Louis and the Case of the Missing Women of the Yonne" on Jacques Pradel's "L'Heure du crime" on RTL
- “Émile Louis: The Missing Women of the Yonne” in Affaires sensibles by Fabrice Drouelle on France Inter [[read and listen online]]
