= Michel Fourniret =

French serial killer (1942–2021)

- Fourniret c. 1992
- Born: Michel Paul Fourniret; 4 April 1942; Sedan, France
- Died: 10 May 2021 (aged 79); Paris, France
- Other name: Ogre of the Ardennes
- Spouse: Monique Olivier (1989–2010)
- Conviction: Murder (8 counts)
- Penalty: Life imprisonment without the possibility of parole

Details
- Victims: 8–12+
- Span of crimes: 1987–2003
- Country: France, Belgium
- Date apprehended: 26 June 2003

Michel Paul Fourniret (4 April 1942 – 10 May 2021) was a French serial killer who confessed to killing 12 people in France and Belgium between 1987 and 2003. After he was arrested in June 2003 for the attempted kidnapping of a teenage girl in Ciney, Fourniret confessed in 2004 to killing nine people, eight females and one male, having been informed on by his then-wife, Monique Pierrette Olivier (born 31 October 1948). Fourniret was convicted of seven of these murders on 28 May 2008 and sentenced to life imprisonment without possibility of parole, while Olivier was given life with a minimum term of 28 years for complicity.

In February 2018, Fourniret confessed to killing two more women. On 16 November 2018, Fourniret and Olivier were convicted of the murder of Farida Hammiche, the last of the eight women that Fourniret confessed to killing in 2004. Fourniret was given a second life sentence and Olivier was sentenced to a further 20 years of imprisonment. In March 2020, Fourniret confessed to killing Estelle Mouzin, who disappeared from Guermantes in 2003.

== Early life ==
Fourniret was born in Sedan, France, the son of a metal worker and a homemaker. He claimed to have been sexually abused as a child by his mother. Acquaintances remembered him as a quiet, intelligent child who enjoyed chess and classical music. As an adult, he drifted through a series of menial jobs, including forestry worker and school supervisor.

Fourniret was first arrested at age 24 in 1966 for sexually assaulting a young girl. He was imprisoned in 1984 for sexually assaulting another five girls.

Fourniret placed pen pal ads in a Roman Catholic magazine and started corresponding with Monique Olivier when she saw his ad and wrote to him. He wrote to her of his fantasies of raping and murdering virginal girls; she responded that she would "help" him fulfill those fantasies if he killed her husband, although he never committed this murder. After he was released from prison in 1987, they began a relationship. Soon afterwards, he not only raped but went on to murder young girls, with Olivier as his accomplice.

== Murders ==
On 11 December 1987, Fourniret and Olivier drove in separate vehicles to Auxerre. Seeing 17-year-old Isabelle Laville walking home from school, a girl the couple had seen a day or two earlier and were targeting, Olivier stopped to ask her to join her in the car and give her directions, which Laville agreed to do. Driving down the road, Olivier reached the spot where Fourniret was standing with his car, pretending it had broken down. After Olivier, as planned, pretended to offer him a lift, he got into her car. Fourniret choked Laville with a piece of rope before Olivier sedated her with Rohypnol. The couple brought the girl to their home in Saint-Cyr-les-Colons, where Fourniret raped and strangled her. They threw Laville's body down a disused well in Bussy-en-Othe. Her remains were recovered from the well more than eighteen years later, on 11 July 2006.

In March 1988, Fourniret was contacted by 30-year-old Farida Hammiche. She was the wife of Jean-Pierre Hellegouarch, an imprisoned bank robber with whom Fourniret had shared a cell prior to the latter's release in October 1987. She asked Fourniret to help her unearth a haul from a cemetery in Fontenay-en-Parisis, which had been stolen by members of the Gang des postiches. After Fourniret and Hammiche managed to retrieve the haul, which consisted of gold ingots and coins, Hammiche gave Fourniret a share worth 500,000 francs for helping her dig it up and hiding it in her apartment in Vitry-sur-Seine. On 12 April, aiming to steal Hammiche's share, Fourniret and Olivier lured Hammiche out of her home. They drove her to Clairefontaine-en-Yvelines, where they strangled her and buried her body. The couple then broke into Hammiche's home and stole the haul. They used the money they made from it to buy a château called the Château du Sautou in Donchery. Hammiche's body was never found.

By August, Olivier was pregnant with Fourniret's baby. On 3 August, the couple drove to a supermarket in Châlons-sur-Marne (now Châlons-en-Champagne), and encountered 20-year-old Fabienne Leroy in the car park. With Olivier feigning illness, the couple asked Leroy to join them in their car and give them directions to a doctor's surgery. After Leroy got in, the couple drove to a forest near the military camp of Mourmelon-le-Grand. Fourniret ordered Olivier to look at Leroy's hymen to see if it was still intact, but Olivier refused. After raping Leroy, Fourniret shot her in the chest.

In January 1989, Fourniret met 21-year-old Jeanne-Marie Desramault on the evening train to Charleville-Mézières. The two conversed before arriving in Charleville, where Desramault was staying at a convent. Desramault met Fourniret and Olivier, who had assumed false identities, at the train station again on 18 March, and the couple invited Desramault to come to their house in Floing, an offer she accepted, and Fourniret promised he would drive her home afterwards. After they got to Floing, Fourniret asked Desramault if she was a virgin, and she told him she was not and that she had a boyfriend. Enraged, he attacked her. She fought back as he attempted to rape her, and as she attempted to escape, the couple gagged her with adhesive bandages before Fourniret strangled her. Fourniret and Olivier drove to Donchery and buried Desramault's body in the garden of the Château du Sautou.

Fourniret and Olivier married in July 1989. On the afternoon of 20 December, they drove across the Franco-Belgian border to Saint-Servais, Namur, with their one-year-old son. Fourniret saw 12-year-old Elisabeth Brichet walk to a friend's house, and waited outside for her until she left to walk the short distance home just before 7:00 p.m. He asked her to give him directions to a doctor's surgery for his son. She agreed to do so, and the couple drove back to Floing with her. When Fourniret undressed the girl, he saw that she was menstruating, so Olivier cleaned Brichet's genitals. The next day, the couple took Brichet to the château, where Fourniret strangled her after a failed attempt to suffocate her with a plastic bag. Her body was buried in the garden of the château, near to that of Jeanne-Marie Desramault. There were a number of reported sightings of Brichet, in Belgium and abroad, in the years following her disappearance, and a number of people were suspected by police of abducting her, including another serial killer, Marc Dutroux. After Dutroux's arrest in 1996, Brichet's mother Marie-Noëlle Bouzet helped to organise the White March in honour of Belgium's missing and murdered children. The remains of Brichet and Desramault were exhumed from the gardens of the Château du Sautou on 3 July 2004, after Fourniret and Olivier confessed to the killings.

The final known murder Fourniret committed with Olivier's help took place on 21 November 1990 near France's western coast. The couple drove to a shopping centre in Rezé after leaving court in Nantes, where they had been convicted of burglary. They saw Natacha Danais, a 13-year-old local girl, walking through the car park towards her home, having been sent to fetch her mother's forgotten purse. The couple lured Danais into the van, asking her for directions. After driving to a secluded area near the coast, Fourniret stabbed Danais twice in the chest with a screwdriver and strangled her before leaving her body on the beach. Later investigation suggested that the girl's body was raped after the murder. Eight days later, Jean Groix, a neighbour of Danais's family, was arrested after a white van belonging to him matched the description of the van that Danais' sister had seen her get into from across the shopping centre's car park at the time she disappeared. Groix was found to be lodging suspected members of the ETA in his home; police suspected that Danais had found out about this and that he killed her for that reason. Two months later, Groix committed suicide in his prison cell. He was reported to have been unable to bear the burden of having been accused of murder.

The Fourniret family moved to Sart-Custinne, Gedinne, Belgium, in the early 1990s. Fourniret admitted that he committed two more murders in France between 2000 and 2001, his first in nine-and-a-half-years. He drove alone across the Franco-Belgian border to Charleville-Mézières on 16 May 2000 and lured 18-year-old Céline Saison, who was on her way home from school, into his van in the late afternoon. Driving with her back to Belgium, he raped her before strangling her with a rope and dumping her body in a forest in Sugny, Vresse-sur-Semois. Saison's skeletal remains were discovered there by mushroom pickers on 22 July 2000.

On 5 May 2001, Fourniret drove back to Sedan and met Mananya Thumpong, a 13-year-old girl of Thai origin whom he had met and given a lift home a few weeks earlier, outside the local library. He invited her to come to his house and play with his son. Accepting this offer, Thumpong climbed into the van and was driven to Nollevaux, Paliseul, where Fourniret strangled her. Thumpong's remains were found on 1 March 2002, having been devoured almost entirely by wild animals.

== Arrest, trial and imprisonment ==
Fourniret was arrested at his home in Sart-Custinne, Belgium, on 26 June 2003 after a failed attempt to kidnap a 13-year-old girl. He and Olivier were interrogated extensively but to no avail. A year later, Olivier told the police that her husband had killed a number of people since 1987. Fourniret confessed to killing eight women aged between 12 and 30, and a man who has never been identified. The bodies of four of the identified victims had been discovered in France and Belgium between 1988 and 2002.

Olivier was also arrested, and she and Fourniret were extradited to France, where they helped police find the bodies of three of the four missing victims over the next two years. The trial took place in Charleville-Mézières between 27 March and 28 May 2008. Fourniret was found guilty of the murders of all seven of the victims whose bodies had been found. He was sentenced to life in prison without the possibility of parole. Olivier was sentenced to life with no possibility of parole for 28 years. Fourniret and Olivier were also ordered to pay €1.5 million in moral compensation to family members of the victims. Neither appealed their sentences.

Fourniret admitted to eight murders prior to his trial in 2008. He was convicted of seven of these and sentenced to life in prison.

In November 2023, the trial of his former wife and accomplice Monique Olivier for three murders, including Joanna Parrish and Estelle Mouzin, began.

== Confessions ==
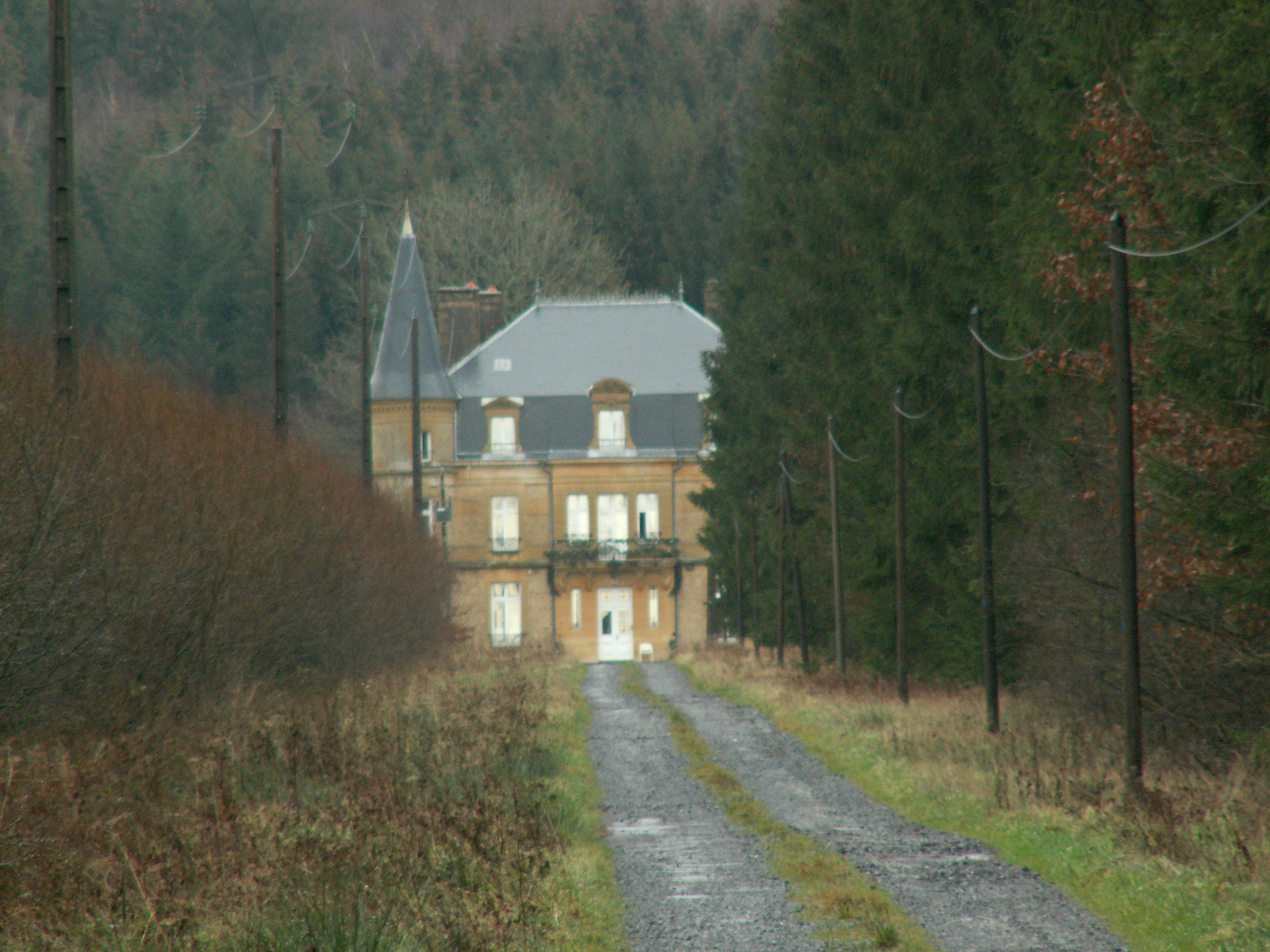
The bodies of two victims, Elisabeth Brichet and Jeanne-Marie Desramault, were found buried in the gardens of the Château du Sautou in Donchery in July 2004. Fourniret and Olivier bought the château in the late 1980s using stolen money.

In February 2018, Fourniret confessed to killing two more women in Auxerre: Marie-Angèle Domèce, an 18-year-old disabled woman, in July 1988, and Joanna Parrish, a 20-year-old British student, in May 1990.

In March 2020, Fourniret confessed to killing Estelle Mouzin, who disappeared from Guermantes in January 2003.

== Known victims ==
| # | Victim | Age | Disappeared | Body found |
|---|---|---|---|---|
| 1 | Isabelle Laville | 17 | 11 December 1987; Auxerre | 11 July 2006; Bussy-en-Othe |
| 2 | Farida Hammiche | 30 | 12 April 1988; Vitry-sur-Seine | Not found |
| 3 | Marie-Angèle Domèce | 18 | 8 July 1988; Auxerre | Not found |
| 4 | Fabienne Leroy | 20 | 3 August 1988; Châlons-sur-Marne | 4 August 1988; Mourmelon-le-Grand |
| 5 | Jeanne-Marie Desramault | 19 | 18 March 1989; Charleville-Mézières | 3 July 2004; Donchery |
| 6 | Elisabeth Brichet | 12 | 20 December 1989; Saint-Servais | 3 July 2004; Donchery |
| 7 | Joanna Parrish | 20 | 16 May 1990; Auxerre | 17 May 1990; Monéteau |
| 8 | Natacha Danais | 13 | 21 November 1990; Rezé | 24 November 1990; Brem-sur-Mer |
| 9 | Céline Saison | 18 | 16 May 2000; Charleville-Mézières | 22 July 2000; Vresse-sur-Semois |
| 10 | Mananya Thumpong | 13 | 5 May 2001; Sedan | 1 March 2002; Paliseul |
| 11 | Estelle Mouzin | 9 | 9 January 2003; Guermantes | Not found |

indicates victims of whose murders Fourniret was convicted.

== Other supposed crimes ==
Two French journalists have suggested that Fourniret killed former Minister for Labour Robert Boulin (who was involved in a real estate scandal at the time), based on a letter Fourniret wrote to Olivier.

Christian Ranucci was one of the last people executed in France, having been convicted of the abduction and murder, committed on 3 June 1974, of Marie-Dolorès Rambla, aged eight. There were suspicions that Ranucci might not have been the killer, having confessed and later retracted his confession. It was suggested that Fourniret may have been involved, as Fourniret was thought to be in the area at the time and had virtually the same car as Ranucci. Expert analysis of courtroom photographs taken during Ranucci's March 1976 trial, however, suggests that the courtroom observer in the photographs could not have been Fourniret who, unlike this man, did not yet wear glasses and lacked a cleft chin. Furthermore, Fourniret denied having been in the Marseille area when the crime took place on 3 June 1974, claiming he was working in Paris.

== Legacy ==
Rachida Dati, then-French Minister for Justice, who advocated legal reforms in France, wanted a more relaxed attitude to preventive custody and parole under supervision. She was heavily criticized by the judiciary. The proximity of the Chateau des Amerois in neighboring Belgium (approximately 30 km or 19 miles) to the Château du Sautou (commune of Donchery) bought by Fourniret was also mentioned.

== Death ==
Fourniret died on 10 May 2021 at the age of 79 after being admitted to hospital with respiratory problems.

== See also ==
- List of serial killers by number of victims
- The case of the missing women of the Yonne
