= Edwin Sidney Hartland =

British folklorist (1848–1927)

Edwin Sidney Hartland (1848–1927) was an author of works on folklore.

== Biography ==
Hartland was born in Islington, eventually making his career as a solicitor in Swansea. His father, E. J. Hartland, was a congregational minister. Throughout his life he served in many judicial positions and on public committees in Swansea and at Gloucester, and took a particular interest in education.

Hartland's works include anthologies of tales, and theories on anthropology and mythology with an ethnological perspective. He believed that the assembling and study of persistent and widespread folklore provided a scientific insight into custom and belief. Hartland was president of the Folklore Society, 1899–1901, and contributed to its journal Folk-Lore; his earlier contributions included a dispute with Andrew Lang.

His daughter was magistrate Ethel Mary Hartland.
