= Hartland (Lewisburg, West Virginia) =

Historic house in West Virginia, United States

- U.S. National Register of Historic Places
- Location within West Virginia Location within the United States
- Location: 2 miles west of Lewisburg on Houfnaggle Rd., Lewisburg, West Virginia
- Coordinates: 37°48′6″N 80°28′29″W
- Area: 1 acre (0.40 ha)
- Built: c. 1800
- Built by: James Clendenin (c. 1800 section); Archibald Clendenin (c. 1812 addition); John Rodgers Clendenin c. 1860 addition)
- NRHP reference No.: 75001889
- Added to NRHP: June 10, 1975

Hartland, also known as the Rodgers Farm, is a historic home located near Lewisburg, West Virginia, United States. The original section was built about 1800, with the two story log addition built sometime after 1812. A third section of similar size to the second was added before 1860. About 1895, a fourth addition was built. In 1912, a porch was added.

It was listed on the National Register of Historic Places in 1975.
