= William Baylor Hartland =

William Baylor Hartland (1836–1912) was a plantsman from Ireland.

== Family ==
WB Hartland's grandfather, Richard Hartland (1745–1821), came to Ireland from the Kew Botanic Gardens in 1776 to become the gardener to the Earl of Kingston at Mitchelstown where he remained until 1785. Richard Hartland established a nursery at Belview, Mallow, in 1787.

Each of Richard Hartland's three sons operated nurseries in County Cork: Arthur Hartland established a nursery at Turner's Cross, Richard Hartland Jr the Lough Nursery, and William Hartland (d.1843) operated the Mallow business. The latter relocated the business to Cork in 1810.

In turn, William Hartland's two sons, William Baylor Hartland (1836–1912) and Henry Albert Hartland (1840–1893) became respectively a plantsman and artist.

== Career ==
From 1878, WB Hartland operated a nursery at Temple Hill, before moving the business a short distance to Ard Cairn, Ballintemple, in 1890. His bulb farm was approximately 10 acres (40,000 m^{2}). Hartland sent flowers from his farm to various markets, including the one at Covent Garden. He also maintained the "Old Established Garden Seed Ware-House" at 24 Patrick Street, Cork.

Hartland was a Guardian of the Cork Union and started a scheme of prizes for country plots. He called attention to the need for agricultural education and advocated the growing of early vegetables and flowers along the southern Irish seaboard.

He was also a florist and seedsman who was a supplier to Queen Victoria. He was awarded Silver Banksian Medal by the Royal Horticultural Society in London May 1903.

== Collection and legacy ==
Hartland began collecting bulbs around 1880, often acquiring them from old Irish gardens. While no species of narcissus is native to Ireland, the climatic conditions have proven favourable for the appearance of self-sown seeding varieties over a long period. In the 19th century, collectors in Ireland, such as Hartland and Fanny Currey, discovered narcissus varieties which were unknown elsewhere. For example, Hartland found the 'Bishop Mann' variety in an old garden of the Dioceses of St. Finbarr's, where Bishop Mann had been the last resident. The bulbs had been planted 150 years before at Bishopstown, now a suburb of Cork.

Hartland's first daffodil catalogue was A little book of daffodils nearly 100 varieties as offered and collected by W.B.Hartland. The early catalogues were whimsical, and did not always find favour with the horticultural establishment. His niece, Gertrude Hartland, illustrated many of his catalogues, including the influential Floral Album of Daffodils (1890) and later editions. The catalog for 1907-8 includes a list of old Irish apples entitled 'old lamps for new lamps'.

In 1890, Hartland located an old species now known as 'Ard Cairn Russet', a late keeping apple, and sent samples to the Royal Horticultural Society. He also collected tulips from Irish gardens and introduced the 'Mrs. Moon' variety. Outside of gardening, Hartland is known for producing a colourful tourist guide after a trip to the west of Ireland. He is also remembered by the naming of the Hartland's Avenue/Road area of Cork City in Lough Parish, the location of one of his nurseries.
