= Sanford Housing Co-operative =

Housing co-operative in London

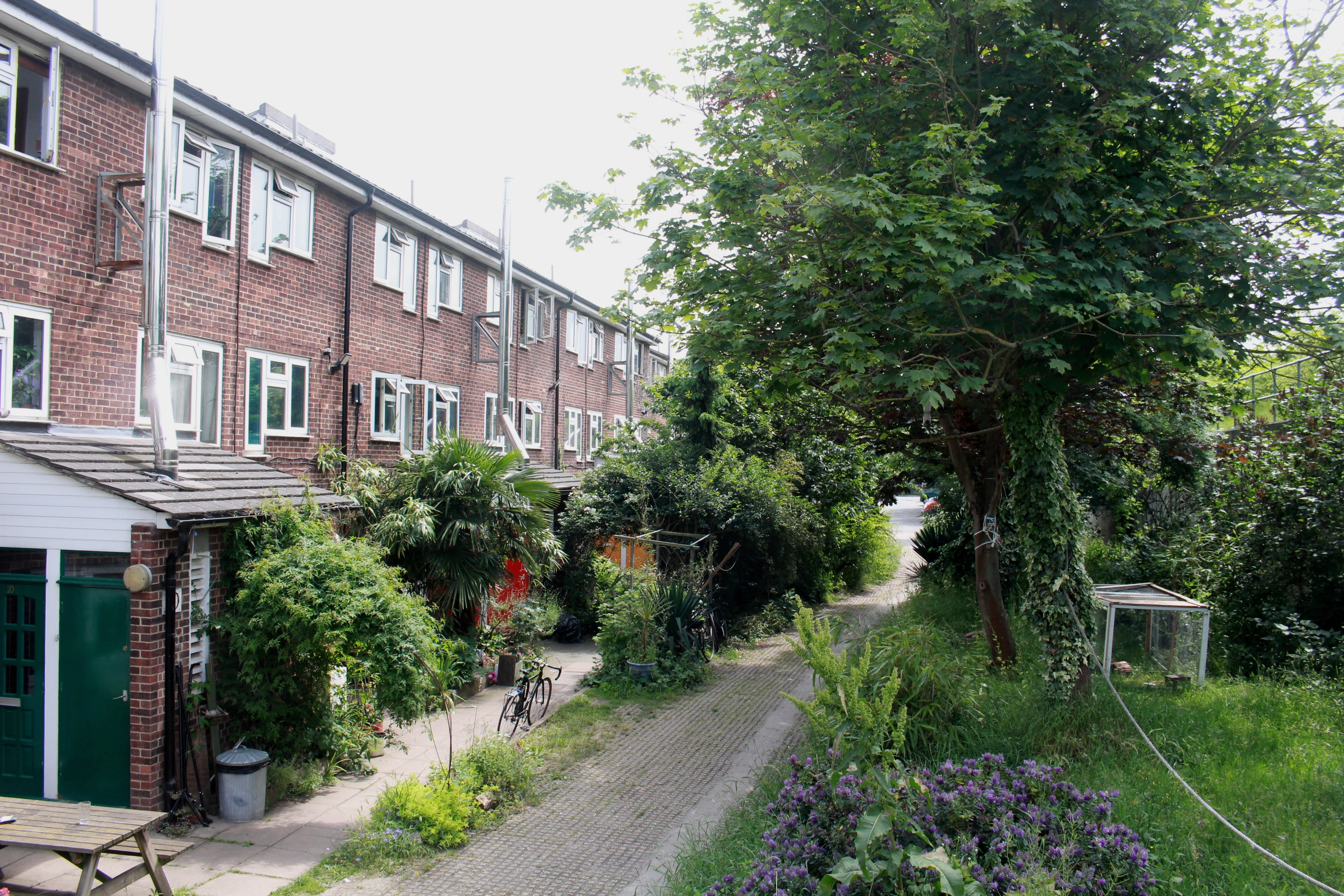
- Street view of Sanford's houses and gardens.
- Interactive map of Sanford Housing Co-operative

General information
- Location: London Borough of Lewisham
- Coordinates: 51.4825°N 0.0423°W
- Status: Running

Construction
- Constructed: 1973

Other information
- Governing body: Sanford Housing Co-operative Limited
- Website: www.sanford.coop

Sanford Housing Co-operative or Sanford Co-op is a housing co-operative located in south east London. Currently home to around 120 people, it is the first purpose-built housing co-operative in the United Kingdom and has run without interruption since its opening in 1974.

== Description ==
Sanford Co-op consists of a street with 14 shared houses occupied by 8 members in average and 6 studio flats with single occupancy. There are also outside areas including a garden with a pond, a car park, various workshops, and a bike shed.

=== Management ===
The co-operative is managed by its members, in accordance with the cooperative principles. Open meetings are held on a monthly basis with a management committee formed by representants from each house. More than 40 officer roles are defined for members to carry out specific tasks. In addition, Sanford buys support services from the Co-operative Development Society through a dedicated officer.

=== Legal status ===
Sanford Housing Co-operative Ltd is a fully-mutual housing co-operative, registered by the Financial Conduct Authority under the Co-operative and Community Benefit Societies Act 2014. It is mutual as per the definition from the Commission on Co-operative and Mutual Housing, stating in 2009 a mutual housing organisation as one "which enables residents, through having the right to become members, to control or participate in governance and to exercise control over their housing environment, neighbourhood and community." Hence it differs from other types of co-ops such as shortlife housing co-ops, housing association management co-ops, tenant management organisations, and other types of collectively managed housing schemes.

More specifically, it operates on a par value basis, preventing members to hold any financial interest in the society since their individual share value (a nominal sum of £1) is fixed and not indexed on the market property price or inflation as for co-ownership housing associations, the other type of fully-mutual housing co-operatives.

== History ==
=== Genesis: 1967–1973 ===
Sanford Housing Co-operative was born as a pilot project following five years of intensive lobbying. The original idea was outlined in a paper by the President of the University of London Union John Hands published in March 1967, proposing self-governing co-operative communities as a solution to the housing crisis affecting students and others.

The negotiations took place between the Student Co-operative Dwelling (SCD)—a co-operative founded in April 1968 to support this scheme and develop housing co-operatives—and various parliamentary functions including the Department of the Environment, Ministry of Housing, Welsh Office, Scottish Office and the Department of Education & Science. Despite lengthy administrative difficulties, planning consent was finally granted by the Department of the Environment in January 1973 along with an option mortgage subsidy to bring the current variable interest rate of 11% down to 7.4% for the lease purchase and developments. SCD registered Sanford Co-operative Dwellings as a local co-operative society and acquired a one-acre site deemed unsuitable for families from the Borough of Lewisham. SCD contracted the design and building to its professional consultants based on its brief, and the construction started in June 1973. According to John Hands, this made Sanford Co-operative "the first estate purpose-built for a housing co-operative of its kind in Great Britain". The mode of funding was also innovative for this type of project: "It was the first time that Housing Corporation loans have been made available for communal houses. With half the cost borrowed from an insurance company it is the first voluntary housing scheme to attract capital from other than public funds or building societies."

=== Opening: 1974 ===
Sanford Housing Co-operative (then called Sanford Co-operative Dwellings) was opened on 1 October 1974 by Lord Goodman, Chairman of the Housing Corporation, in the presence of John Silkin, Minister for Planning and Local Government. The first general meeting of members took place on the 30th of October, with handover from the founder members to the members. Shortly after, Prince Philip visited the site to express his support to Sanford and to the general scheme.

=== SCD's role in the development of housing co-operatives ===
Sanford Co-op was born as a pilot to a general scheme of par-value co-operatives advocated by SCD. In parallel, an intense lobbying campaign was carried out by SCD, including publications of pamphlets, manifestos, reports, fund-raising events, tabled amendements to the Housing Bill 1969, and parliamentary discussions.

Support for the scheme was expressed twice by Prince Philip who spoke at a fundraising event for SCD in 1969 and chaired a teach-in on housing co-operatives on 21 November 1974.

As part of the same programme, other development sites at Temple Mills (E15) and Octavius Street (SE9) were proposed and approved in 1975 by the Housing Corporation and local authorities, leading to the creation of Clays Lane Housing co-operative and Deptford Housing Co-operative. SCD continued to open fully mutual housing co-operatives in the following years, namely with the Two Piers Housing Co-operative (in Brighton) in 1978 and Argyle Housing Co-operative (in Cambridge) in 1981.

=== Carbon 60 project: 2005—2009 ===
From its inception in 2005 to its completion in 2009, the co-op undertook a major development project to reduce its greenhouse gas emissions, called Carbon 60. It consisted in building various systems for energy efficiency including wood pellet biomass boilers (now replaced), solar water heating systems, eco-kitchens, ventilation systems and double glazing. 40% of the £230,000 cost was funded by the Energy Savings Trust. This project was awarded with the Inside Housing "award for sustainable social housing refurbishment 2008".

=== Bike shed construction: 2008 ===
A central bike shed was built by residents in 2008 after the design by Christos Choraitis, an architect living there at the time. It provides secured storage for about 80 bikes but also hosts an organic roof garden. The structure is made of recycled Congolese railway sleepers found in Belgium.

=== Freehold acquisition: 2012 ===
While previously on a long-term lease, the freehold for the site's land was bought from Lewisham Council in 2012, thus improving the long-term security of the co-operative.

== Reception ==
The place, its organisation and community have been studied throughout the years, with various reported succcesses often attributed to its underlying alternative housing scheme. By providing affordable housing to thousands of people over nearly 50 years, it has been portrayed as an example of how housing co-operatives could help solve the housing crisis. Besides, Sanford's co-operative structure has been described as encouraging skill-sharing and control over the communal property. For instance, residents collectively decided to switch to renewable energy in 2005, undertaking a major development project on the site to reduce carbon emissions (see Carbon 60).

== Art and Culture ==
An iconic 35-by-32-feet mural called Riders of the Apocalypse was painted on one of the houses' walls by Brian Barnes in 1983. The artist was part of the collective London Muralists for Peace whose purpose was to paint giant paintings on anti-war themes and who received a £42,000 investment by the Greater London Council for six murals to commemorate the GLC Peace Year in 1983. Sanford inhabitants agreed to have their wall painted, and collectively participated in the design process with Brian Barnes. Foreseeing that the mural may outlive its portrayed politicians (Margaret Thatcher, Ronald Reagan, Michael Heseltine and Yuri Andropov), residents namely suggested skeletons on the trailing missiles instead. The prediction was verified as the mural is still visible and in reasonable condition today, namely owing to the keim paint used by Brian Barnes, instead of commonly used gloss for murals.

Sanford co-op has been involved into various artistic, cultural, and outreach events and projects throughout the years. For instance, it ran a theater club, has regularly taken part in the Deptford X art festival and New Cross & Deptford Free Film Festival, organising free cinema events for the local community.
