= Henry Albert Hartland =

Irish painter

- Born: 2 August 1840; Mallow, County Cork, Ireland
- Died: 28 November 1893 (aged 53); Liverpool, England

Henry Albert Hartland (2 August 1840 – 28 November 1893) was an Irish artist known for his watercolours and landscape paintings.

== Early life and family ==
Hartland was born on 2 August 1840 in Bellevue, Mallow, County Cork. His father was William Baylor Hartland. He attended the Christian Brothers' School in Cork, then enrolling in the Cork School of Art.

His family were nurserymen. His brother William Baylor Hartland was a well known plantsman. He was the uncle of illustrator Gertrude Hartland.

== Career ==
On the moors, Achill Island, Co. Mayo, Ireland, Henry Albert Hartland; 1876. Pencil and watercolour, 67 x 100 cm.

After leaving art college he worked as an illustrator for a Cork bookseller, sketching mostly nature and landscapes, at a weekly salary of 30 shillings. He later built theatrical scenery for the Cork Theatre and the Theatre Royal, Dublin. Hartland moved to Liverpool in search of work around 1870, and lived there for most of the rest of his life. His work was very popular, with Walter G. Strickland claiming he sold paintings as fast as he could paint them. He lived in London for a short period, and then in Huddersfield, occasionally visiting Ireland.

Hartland sold five landscapes to the Royal Hibernian Academy while on a visit to Cork in 1865, after which he occasionally exhibited with the academy. In 1868 he exhibited two landscapes with the Royal Academy, London from 72 South Mall, Cork. He was a member of the Society of Painters in Watercolour and the Liverpool Academy. Some of his watercolours were signed Albert Hartland.

Hartland died on 28 November 1893 at Waterloo, Liverpool, following a fall off a cliff. His work was exhibited at the 1904 Guildhall Exhibition of Irish Art in London.

Hartland's seascapes were among those gifted by The Port of Cork Company to the Crawford Art Gallery in November 2021. Hartland had spent some time sketching the area around Cork harbour with his art student, John Fergus O'Hea.

== Selected works ==
- The Dark Valley, Killarney
- The Gap of Dunlo
- Rain, near Inchageela, Co. Cork
- The Last Ray of Evening, Shannon Bridge, King's County held in the Victoria and Albert Museum
- An Irish Bog, Co. Mayo held in Reading Museum
- Moorland, Barmouth held in Walker Art Gallery, Liverpool
- On the side of the Bog of Allen held in Walker Art Gallery
- On the Wharfe held in Walker Art Gallery
