= Ethel Mary Hartland =

Welsh suffragist and magistrate (1875–1964)

Ethel Mary Hartland JP
- Born: 1 September 1875; Morriston, Swansea, Wales
- Died: 11 September 1964 (aged 89); Cheltenham, Gloucestershire, England
- Education: Ribston Hall School for Girls
- Occupations: Suffragist, activist and magistrate
- Employer: Victoria County History
- Organization(s): League of Pity; National Union of Women’s Suffrage Societies; Gloucestershire Women Magistrates Society; Gloucestershire’s Standing Joint Committee of JPs and county councillors National Council of Women of Great Britain; Gloucester Welsh Society
- Father: Edwin Sidney Hartland

Ethel Mary Hartland JP (1 September 1875 – 11 September 1964) was a British women's rights activist, suffragist and magistrate.

== Biography ==
Hartland on 1 September 1875 in Morriston, Swansea, Wales. Her father was Edwin Sidney Hartland (1848–1927), who worked as a solicitor in Swansea, and her mother was Mary Elizabeth Hartland (née Morgan, 1851–1945), a social activist and philanthropist.

Hartland and her family moved to Gloucester, Gloucestershire, when her father became registrar of the Gloucestershire County Court. She was educated at Ribston Hall School for Girls in Gloucester, then abroad in Geneva and Hanover, learning to speak German fluently.

After returning to England, Hartland served as Honorary Secretary of the League of Pity, the children’s branch of the National Society for Prevention of Cruelty to Children (NSPCC), from 1902 to 1922. She worked on the Gloucestershire Victoria County History for two years from 1907 to 1909.

Hartland was a suffragist and joined the National Union of Women’s Suffrage Societies (NUWSS). During World War I, she served on several local charity committees, including a food economy committee and a war savings committee, and held a garden party with her mother which raised funds for the Scottish Women’s Hospitals for Foreign Service.

In May 1922, Hartland was appointed Justice of the Peace (JP) for Gloucestershire, becoming the first woman to hold this position. Also in 1922, Hartland founded the Gloucestershire Women Magistrates Society (GWMS), which met quarterly. After the appointment of more female JPs in the area, membership grew to include educator Lilian Faithfull, educator Rosa Pease and trade unionist Ada Prosser. Through the society, Hartland fundraised to purchase a prison piano. In 1925, Hartland was elected to Gloucestershire’s Standing Joint Committee of JPs and county councillors (SJC). She attended the 1935 International Penal and Penitentiary Congress (IPPC) in Berlin, Germany. She was secretary of the GWMS until 1944.

Hartland was also a member of the Gloucester Branch of the National Council of Women of Great Britain. In 1944, she chaired a meeting of the Council where she urged for children's allowances to be paid directly to their mothers.

In 1943, Hartland encouraged the Women's Council to support to the National Federation of Women’s Institutes (WI) campaign for female police officers to be accepted into the British Police Service. Her women's policing campaign became a model for other activists. She was invited to speak at women's organisations across the country, such as in Cambridge, Dover and Exeter, and was quoted in newspapers as an authority on the campaign for the appointment and retention of female police officers. Gloucestershire Constabulary was among the first territorial force to accept women into both the regular and reserve forces.

During World War II, Hartland was involved with supporting Jewish refugees from Nazism through the Gloucester Association for Aiding Refugees (GAAR). She provided funds for a property to house refugee children, which became the Gloucester Association for Aiding Refugees Hostel.

Hartland was also a supporter of the Gloucester Welsh Society.

Hartland died on 11 September 1964 from cerebral thrombosis in her home at Cheltenham, Gloucestershire, England.
