= Gertrude Hartland =

Irish artist

Gertrude Hartland (1865–1954) was an Irish illustrator and landscape painter. From County Cork, other members of the Hartland family were involved in horticulture and art, and she was primarily known for illustrations and paintings of flowers.

== Life and work ==
Born in County Cork, she was the daughter of Richard Hartland and Mary Walsh, and the niece of artist Henry Albert Hartland and plantsman William Baylor Hartland.

Hartland painted flowers, mainly daffodils. Her uncle, WB Hartland, a plantsman who specialised in daffodils, produced a number of catalogues in the 1880s and 1890s which were illustrated with her engraved floral images. This included several editions of the Little Book of Daffodils - for which her drawings were engraved by W.J. Welch.

Hartland married a man named Stephen Jackson. She died in 1954.
