= Michael Hartland =

British writer

Michael Hartland MBE, FRSA
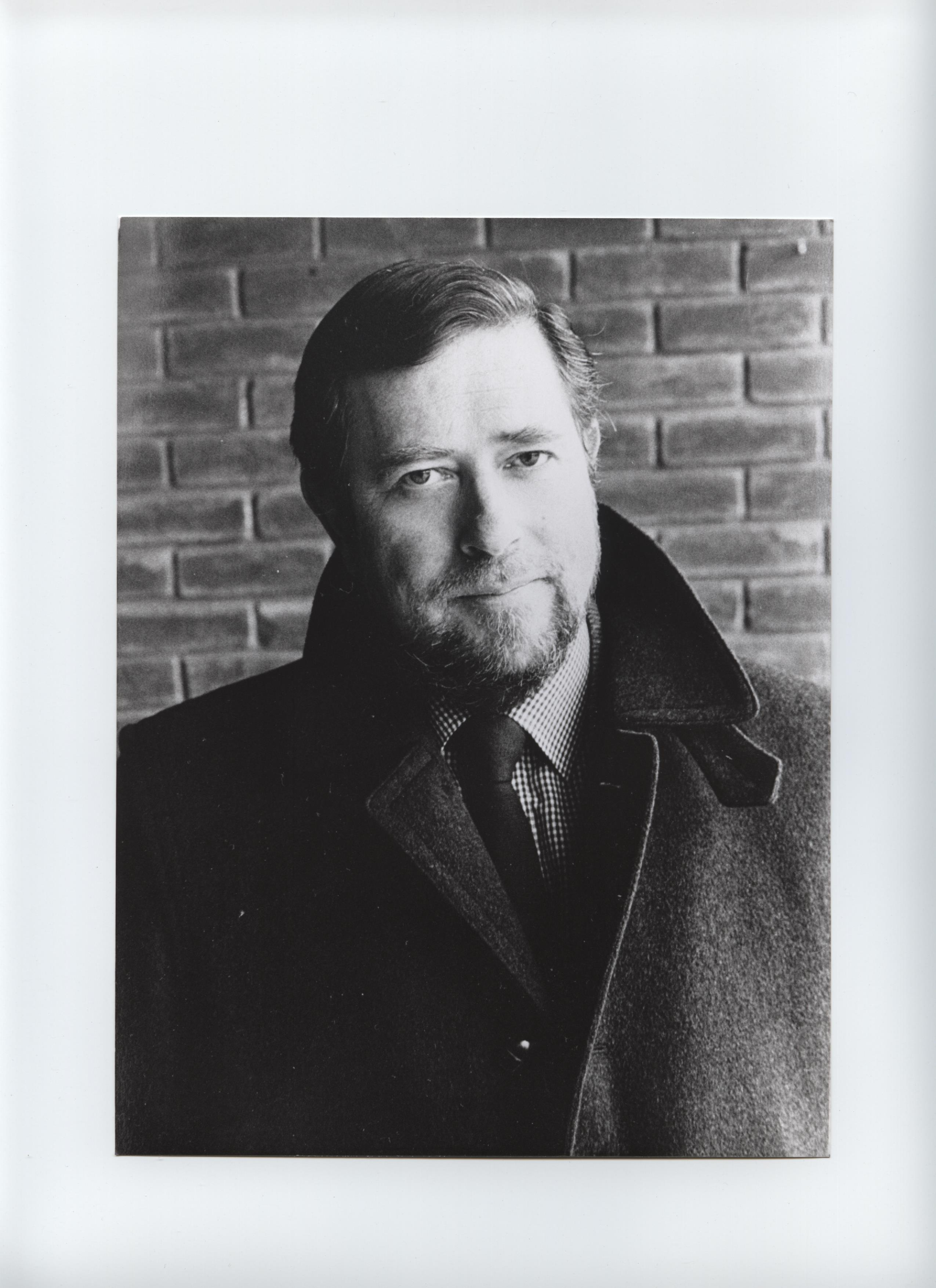
- Born: Michael James; 7 February 1941 (age 85)
- Education: Christ's College, Cambridge
- Occupation: Writer
- Writing career
- Genre: Thrillers
- Notable works: Seven Steps to Treason; The Year of the Scorpion; Sonia's Report – ITV
- Notable awards: MBE, FRSA; South West Arts Literary Award

Michael James MBE FRSA (born 7 February 1941), better known by the pen-name Michael Hartland, is a British thriller writer, who also writes for radio and television. He was the thriller critic of The Daily Telegraph, has written for other broadsheet papers including The Times, The Sunday Times and The Guardian and is a BBC Radio-4 broadcaster.

== Early life and work ==
Hartland was educated at Latymer Upper School in Hammersmith and Christ's College, Cambridge. In 1963, he was recruited to government service and served as Private Secretary to Jennie Lee MP (later Baroness Lee of Asheridge) when she was the first Minister for the Arts and establishing the Open University. With a change of government, he found himself working briefly on the Open University for Margaret Thatcher (when she was Secretary of State for Education), before being transferred to intelligence and security duties for five years, working in counter-terrorism. This included the security of nuclear sites and materials in the Provisional IRA bombing campaign and took him to Japan and other countries with nuclear industries and security concerns.

== Programme Director, International Atomic Energy Agency ==
From 1978 to 1983 he was on the staff of a United Nations organisation, the International Atomic Energy Agency (IAEA), in Vienna. The main task of IAEA is to work for the non-proliferation of nuclear weapons and, reporting to Director-General Hans Blix, he was Director of a programme to strengthen controls on weapons grade plutonium, which took him to most parts of the world.

== Writer ==
While in Vienna, he had written his first novel, Down Among the Dead Men, an espionage thriller set in Hong Kong, which was published by Macmillan in New York in 1982 and Hodder & Stoughton in London in 1983. He used the pen-name Michael Hartland.

The decision to leave a salaried job for full-time writing was not easy, particularly with two young children, but Dead Men was widely and well-reviewed on both sides of the Atlantic. Ted Allbeury welcomed its "rich variety of credible characters, a plot that really hums along and descriptions of far away places that make you reach for the travel brochures. All the signs of a future winner." The Guardian found it "cleverly plotted and impressive... with complex double-bluff", The Scotsman "Sinuously sinister", and the Los Angeles Times "complex as a Chinese puzzle ... what distinguishes Hartland are his exotic settings and precise portraits of the agents." Kirkus Reviews, however, found "Lots of potentially rich material here ... but ex-agent Hartland, who writes with crisply sturdy efficiency, hasn't found the right shape for suspenseful plotting."

Dead Men introduced two characters who would figure in this series of Cold War books – David Nairn, working-class boy from Scotland, who went to Oxford and is now a key player in MI6, and Major-General Nadia Alexandrovna Kirova, who has got to the top of Soviet military intelligence, the GRU, despite being a woman, and is now battling to keep her place in the Politburo. They continue as antagonists in Hartland's second novel, Seven Steps to Treason, described by The Sunday Times as "A stunning display of diplomatic and undercover knowhow, of SAS dare-devilry and the old global double-cross". A profile in The Guardian in 1985 concluded that Seven Steps to Treason was "very good indeed – a cross between le Carre without the longeurs and Adam Hall with intellect". It won a South West Arts Literary Award.

Throughout the 1960s, '70s and '80s, allegations – in newspapers, broadcasting and books – were common currency that the Soviet Union had a "Fifth Man", in addition to Burgess, Maclean, Philby and Blunt, somewhere at the top of MI5 or MI6. It was often suggested that this was Sir Roger Hollis, who had served in MI5 during the war and as its Director-General 1956–65 – and been summoned from retirement to be grilled by his former subordinates, but not to any conclusion. Was he a traitor? The key to the truth was believed to be Red Army Intelligence Colonel Ursula Kuczynski, who was a Soviet agent undercover near Oxford in World War II. But she had vanished behind the Iron Curtain in 1950 and neither the security services nor a posse of investigative journalists appeared to have any idea where she was or even whether she was alive. Hartland's next book, The Third Betrayal, explored her life story and the "Fifth Man" in fictional form. Publishers Weekly called it "a nail-biting tale". The Kirkus review described it as an "unfashionably but mercifully intelligible thriller."

Hartland's thrillers were published in America as well as the UK, and translated into Japanese and twenty-seven other languages. In Scorpion Magazine, Michael Johnson wrote, "Michael Hartland is one of the most exciting new spy writers ..... his characters are real people: neither glamorous like Ian Fleming's, nor gargoyles like some of le Carre's. Hartland creates particularly believable and empathetic women – in fact women feature more, and as intelligence officers rather than bimbos, than in most thrillers." and "Hartland is now a master thriller writer, but his popularity goes beyond that. The key is that these are perceptive novels as well as spy stories, far-sighted as well as entertaining ..."

=== "Sonia" and "The Fifth Man" ===
After reading The Third Betrayal, a number of people who had been involved in Ursula Kuczynski's dramatic life contacted Hartland, some from as far away as Australia, and he was able to piece together more of her story. Finally he ran her to earth (he will not reveal how), living in hidden retirement as a senior party member with the Order of the Red Banner, in East Berlin. She had spoken to no one from the West for forty years, but made him tea in her kitchen and, a few days later, gave a long filmed interview – the first with a major Soviet spy who had not defected but remained in place and a committed communist. Her interview provided the core for his 60-minute television documentary Sonia's Report (ITV Channel 3, 1990), detailing her recruitment in Shanghai by Richard Sorge, Stalin's leading agent in the Far East, training in Moscow, hair-raisingly dangerous service with the communist underground in China – and finally to Oxford in 1941, posing as a Jewish refugee from Nazi Germany with two children, but in fact acting as courier for Klaus Fuchs as he betrayed the secrets of the atom bomb to Stalin. In the War, Fuchs had been allowed a car as a scientist on military work, but "Sonia" had cycled to rural locations near Banbury for their secret meetings – and still had the bicycle in her Berlin cellar.

Hartland followed up with a feature Sonia – the Spy who Haunted Britain in The Sunday Times. She was emphatic that she had never heard of Hollis until there was speculation about him and had not controlled anyone in MI5, only Fuchs. However, she had survived for nine years while betraying a massive military secret that would change the world order when the bombs were dropped in 1945. She said the normal survival time for an agent was three years and maybe someone – she did not know who – had been protecting her? She revealed that a well-spoken man she did not know had appeared on her doorstep the night before Fuchs was arrested and told her to flee, which she did.

After dramatising Seven Steps to Treason for Saturday Night Theatre on BBC Radio 4, with Michael Williams and Tom Fleming, he recorded Masterspy, a series of interviews with the KGB defector Oleg Gordievsky on Radio 4. Gordievsky confirmed that the fifth man was John Cairncross, who served at Bletchley Park in the war, and that the allegations about Hollis were nonsense. Hartland also told Gordievsky's story in a feature in the Guardian Once a Spy, Twice a Spy.

Hartland started reviewing books in 1985, in his Hartland's Point column for the Western Morning News, but moved to the Daily Telegraph as thriller critic in 1993. He was a regular travel writer for The Times during the 1990s and an occasional broadcaster on Radio-4 in programmes like A Good Read. He became a tutor on Arvon Foundation courses for new writers, a judge for the Crime Writers' Association Gold & Silver Daggers and was elected to the Detection Club in 1997. He has been a Fellow of the Royal Society of Arts (FRSA) and an Honorary Fellow of Exeter University since 1985.

== Chairman of Kennaway House Trust, Devon ==
After Sonia and Gordievsky, he was researching contemporary Islamic politics and terrorism for a second series of espionage thrillers; and published a one-off crime novel Dead Fish under the pen-name Ruth Carrington in 1998. But a successful writing career was suddenly interrupted by a major heart attack. While recovering, he decided to drastically reduce his workload. Almost immediately he was asked to lead a campaign to raise £1 million to restore a historic Georgian mansion in Sidmouth, Devon, which had become derelict and faced demolition. He agreed, and the campaign was successful, but took six years. A beautiful restoration was completed in 2009, when he was elected the first Chairman of the Kennaway House Trust, a registered charity which now runs the house as an arts and community centre. Kennaway House is popular and successful, now employing three staff and turning over £100,000 a year.

In the Queen's Birthday Honours 2012, he was appointed a Member of the Order of the British Empire (MBE) for services to the community. In 2013 the whole David Nairn series of espionage novels was republished in paperback and Kindle. Dead Fish was republished in the same way in 2016. All his novels were republished again in 2020.

== Personal life ==
Michael Hartland and his family lived in Vienna for five years from 1978. Since the publication of Down Among the Dead Men in 1983, the family home has been a farmhouse close to the sea in Devon. He has two grown up daughters.

== Publications ==
=== David Nairn espionage novels ===
- Down Among the Dead Men (1982)
- Seven Steps to Treason (1985)
- The Third Betrayal (1986)
- Frontier of Fear (1989)
- The Year of the Scorpion (1991)

=== Stand alone ===
- Dead Fish (under pen-name Ruth Carrington) (1998)

=== Other publications ===
- The Verdict of Us All (short stories – contributor, Allison & Busby 2006) ISBN 0-74908-192-9
- Masters of Crime: Lionel Davidson and Dick Francis (Scorpion Press 2006) ISBN 1-873567-78-2, with HRF Keating and Michael Johnson

=== Television ===
- Sonia's Report – ITV Channel 3 ( 11 July 1990)

=== BBC Radio-4 ===
- Seven Steps to Treason, Saturday Night Theatre, with Michael Williams and Tom Fleming (2 June 1990)
- Masterspy: interviews with Oleg Gordievsky (30 October 6 and 13 November 1991)
