= Heartland Inn =

American hotel chain

Coordinates: 42.4672°N 92.3587°W

The current Heartland Inn Logo

The original Heartland Inn Logo (1984-June 2006)

Heartland Inn is a Waterloo, Iowa, based chain of hotels. The company operated 19 locations, with 18 in Iowa and one in Wisconsin. The company was put up for sale by Joe Minard at the start of June 2007, the sale includes Heartland Midwest Management and 18 of the 19 properties (All except the Clear Lake, IA Location) Only one location remains in Iowa City/Coralville, Iowa.

== Background ==
In 1984, Joe Minard and Ross Christensen of Waterloo began efforts to develop hotels. They decided that there was a need for moderately priced hotels. They opened the first such hotel in Waterloo. Eventually 18 other locations were opened in Iowa and Wisconsin.

The hotels are built with a red brick exterior. The majority of Heartland Inns are "rooms only" facilities, but many of the hotels have swimming pools. The hotels also offer a deluxe continental breakfast featuring over 30 different hot and cold items. Competitors include Microtel, Red Roof Inn, and Park Inn/Suites.

The company began moving in 2006 towards making their properties entirely smoke free. On June 14, 2006, the company announced that their hotels were 100% smoke-free. Heartland Inn was one of the first hotel chains to move all their properties in such a direction. American Cancer Society has since endorsed the smoke-free status of Heartland Inn.

== Locations ==
=== Iowa ===
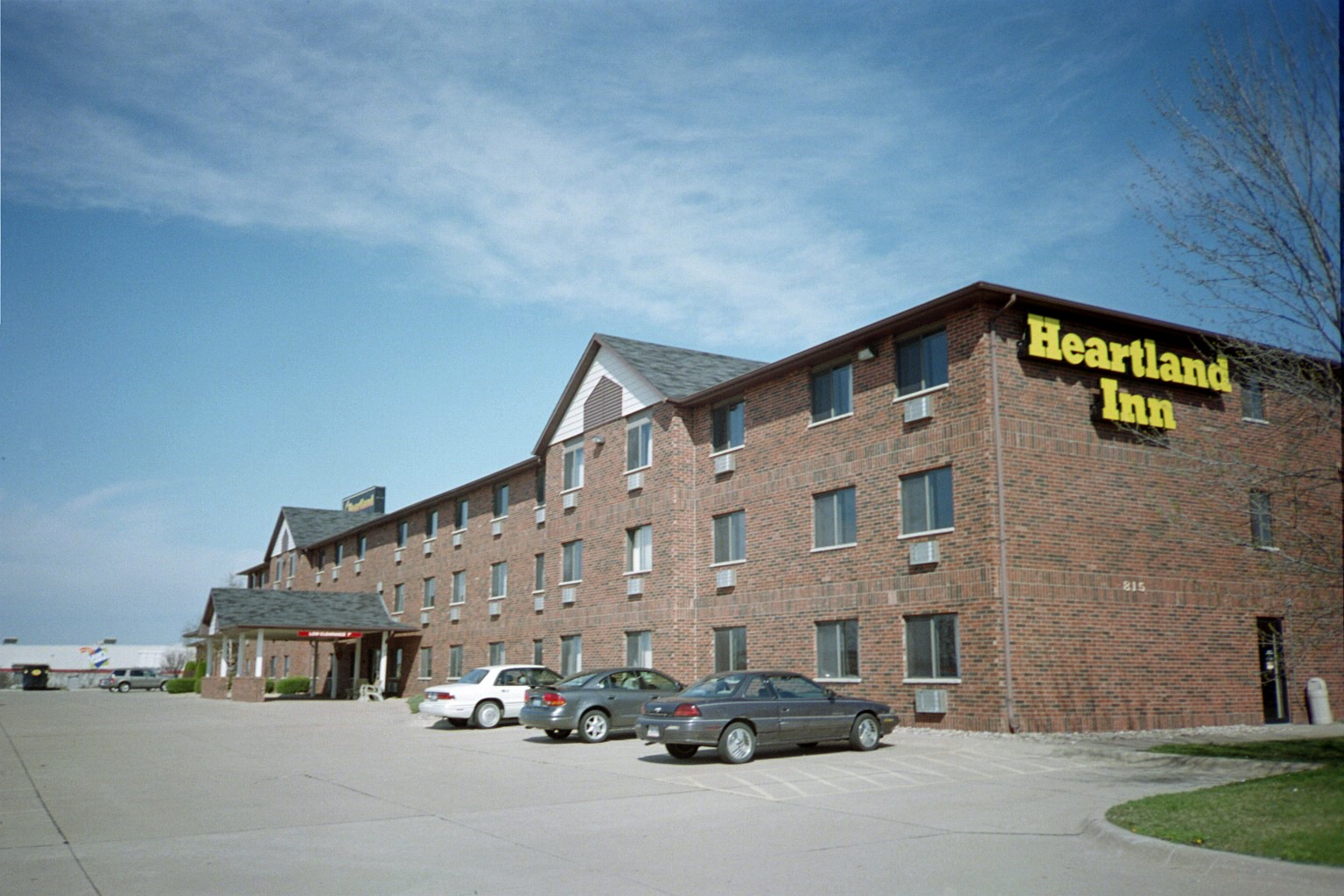
Heartland Inn located in Bettendorf, Iowa

- Ames (now an Econo Lodge)
- Cedar Rapids (now a HomeTown Inn)
- Clear Lake (now the South Shore Inn)
- Council Bluffs (now an AmericInn)
- The Des Moines Metropolitan Area
  - Altoona (now a Best Western)
  - Ankeny (now a Quality Inn)
  - Des Moines (now a Days Inn)
  - Clive, Iowa (now a Super 8)
- Decorah (now a Quality Inn & Suites)
- Dubuque (2 Locations) (now an Econo Lodge and Baymont Inn)
- Iowa City (the only Heartland Inn remaining)
- Mt. Pleasant (now a Best Western)
- The Quad Cities of Iowa and Illinois
  - Bettendorf (now an Econo Lodge)
  - Davenport (now a Quality Inn)
- Ottumwa (now a Quality Inn)
- Waterloo (2 Locations)(now a Days Inn and Howard Johnson)

=== Wisconsin ===
- Eau Claire (now a Baymont Inn)
