= Tessier (surname) =

Tessier and Teissier are surnames of French origin. Notable people with the surname include:

- Albert Tessier (1895–1976), French-Canadian priest, historian, and filmmaker
- Alex Tessier (born 1993), Canadian rugby union player
- Auguste Tessier (1853–1938), Canadian lawyer and politician from Quebec
- Auguste-Maurice Tessier (1879–1932), Canadian lawyer and politician
- Benoit Tessier (1509–1565), French physician and naturalist also known as "Benoit Textor"
- Bernard Teissier (born 1945), French mathematician
- Carmen Tessier (1911–1980), French journalist and gossip columnist
- Charles Tessier (c. 1550 – after 1604), French composer and lutenist
- Christian Tessier (born 1978), Canadian actor
- Claude Tessier (1943–2010), Canadian politician from Quebec
- Dan Tessier (born 1979), Canadian professional ice hockey player
- Daniel Tessier (?–2007), Canadian police officer
- Élizabeth Teissier (born 1938), French astrologer and former actress
- Élodie Tessier (born 1996), Canadian wheelchair basketball player
- Emilie de Tessier (1850–1890), French cartoonist who worked under the pseudonym Marie Duval
- Éric Tessier (born 1966), Canadian film and television director and screenwriter
- Ernest-Maurice Tessier (1885–1973), French writer known as "Maurice Dekobra"
- François-Xavier Tessier (1799–1835), Canadian doctor, publisher, and political figure
- Gaston Tessier (1887–1960), French trade unionist
- Guy Teissier (born 1945), Member of the National Assembly of France.
- Henri Antoine Marie Teissier (1929–2020), French Catholic Bishop, Archbishop Emeritus of Algiers
- James C. Tessier (1842–1900), English merchant and politician in Newfoundland
- Jean-Michel Tessier (born 1977), Frecnh cyclist
- John Tessier (1758–1840), French-American Roman Catholic priest
- Joseph-Adolphe Tessier (1861–1928), Canadian politician from Quebec
- Jules Tessier (1852–1934), Canadian lawyer and politician from Quebec
- Kelsey Tessier (born 1990), Canadian professional ice hockey player
- Laurent Tessier (1927–2012), Canadian cyclist
- Lewis Tessier (1820–1884), English-born merchant and politician in Newfoundland
- Lyndsay Tessier (born 1978), Canadian long-distance athlete
- Marc Tessier-Lavigne (born 1959), Canadian-American neuroscientist
- Marcel Tessier (1934–2024), Canadian historian, opera signer, and professor
- Marie-Rose Tessier (1910–2026), French supercentenarian
- Mary Teissier (1917–1990), Ukrainian-French socialite and mistress of J. Paul Getty
- Odette Teissier du Cros (1906-1997), French ethnologist, curator
- Orval Tessier (1933–2022), Canadian professional ice hockey player
- Paul Tessier (1917–2008), French surgeon in the field of craniofacial surgery
- Paul Tessier (rowing) (born 1961), Canadian rowing coxswain
- Peter G. Tessier (1819–1886), English-born merchant and politician in Newfoundland
- Pierre Le Tessier (1255–1325), French cardinal
- Rémi Tessier (born 1964), French interior superyacht designer
- Robert Tessier (1934–1990), American actor and stuntman
- Roger Tessier (born 1939), French composer
- Thomas Tessier (born 1947), American author of horror novels and short stories
- Ulric-Joseph Tessier (1817–1892), Canadian lawyer, judge, and politician from Quebec
- Valentine Tessier (1892–1981), French actress

== See also ==
- Teisseire (disambiguation)
