= Tessier =

Tessier may refer to:

- Tessier (surname)
- Tessier Biplane
- Tessier Lake, in Quebec
- Tessier, Saskatchewan, village

== See also ==
- Tesser, surname
- Tissier, surname
