= Tissier =

Tissier is a surname of French origin. Notable people with the surname include:

- Amandine Tissier (born 1993), a handball player
- Bernard Tissier de Mallerais (born 1945), a French Traditionalist Roman Catholic bishop
- Christian Tissier (born 1951), aikido teacher
- Georgette Tissier (1910–1959), actor and spouse of Jean Tissier
- Jean Tissier (1896–1973), actor and spouse of Georgette Tissier
- Jean-Baptiste-Ange Tissier (1814–1876), French painter
- Joseph Tissier, bishop of Châlons in France
- Luke Le Tissier (born 1996), cricketer
- Marcel Tissier (1903–1982), French racing cyclist
- Matt Le Tissier (born 1968), former football player and television presenter
- Maya Le Tissier (born 2002), English professional footballer
- Patrick Tissier (born 1952), French serial killer and rapist
- Pierre Tissier (1903–1955), French resistance fighter
- René Tissier (1899–1982), French racing cyclist
