= Police vehicles in the United States and Canada =

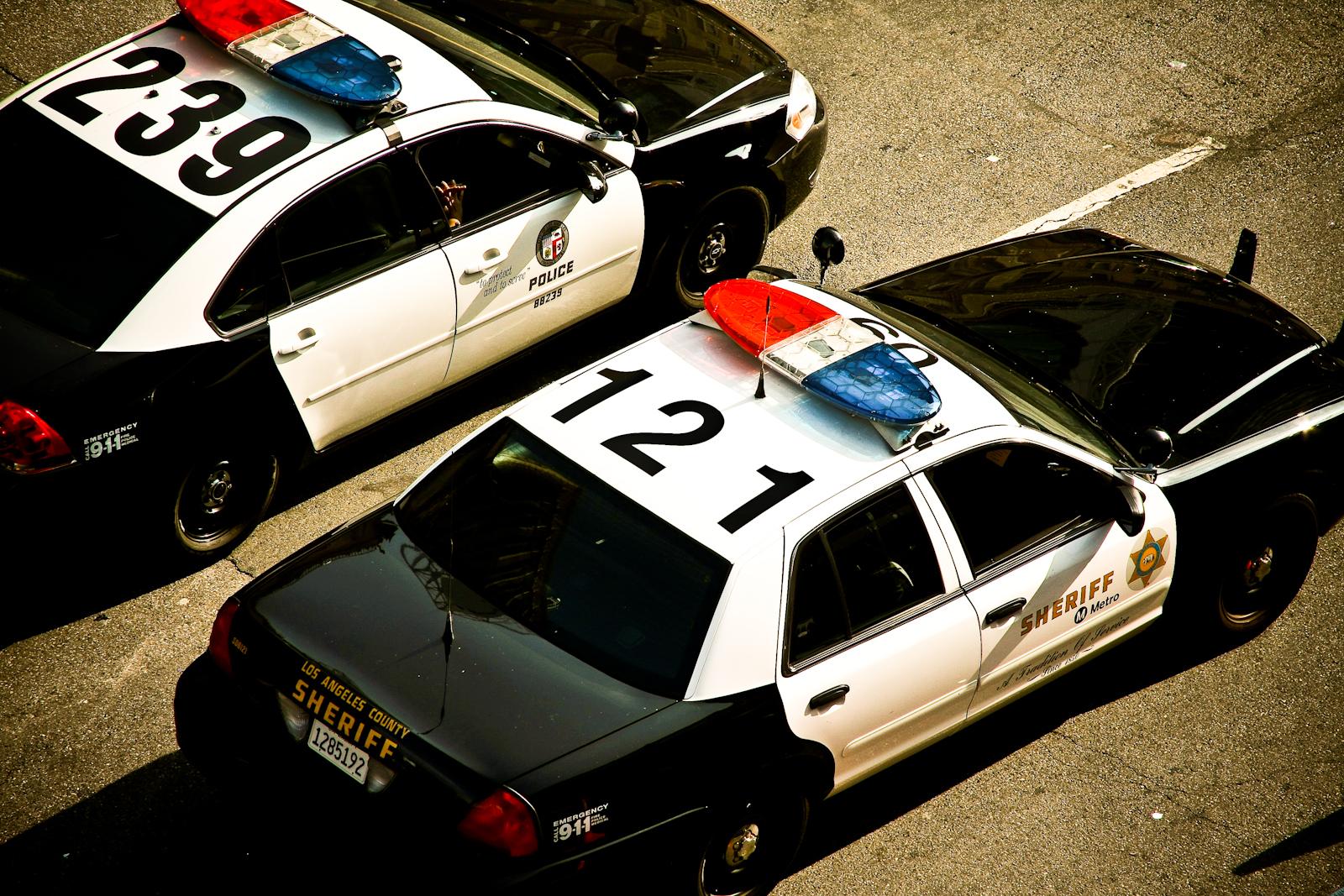
Chevrolet Impala 9C1 and Ford Crown Victoria Police Interceptor black and white patrol cars used by the Los Angeles Police Department and Los Angeles County Sheriff's Department

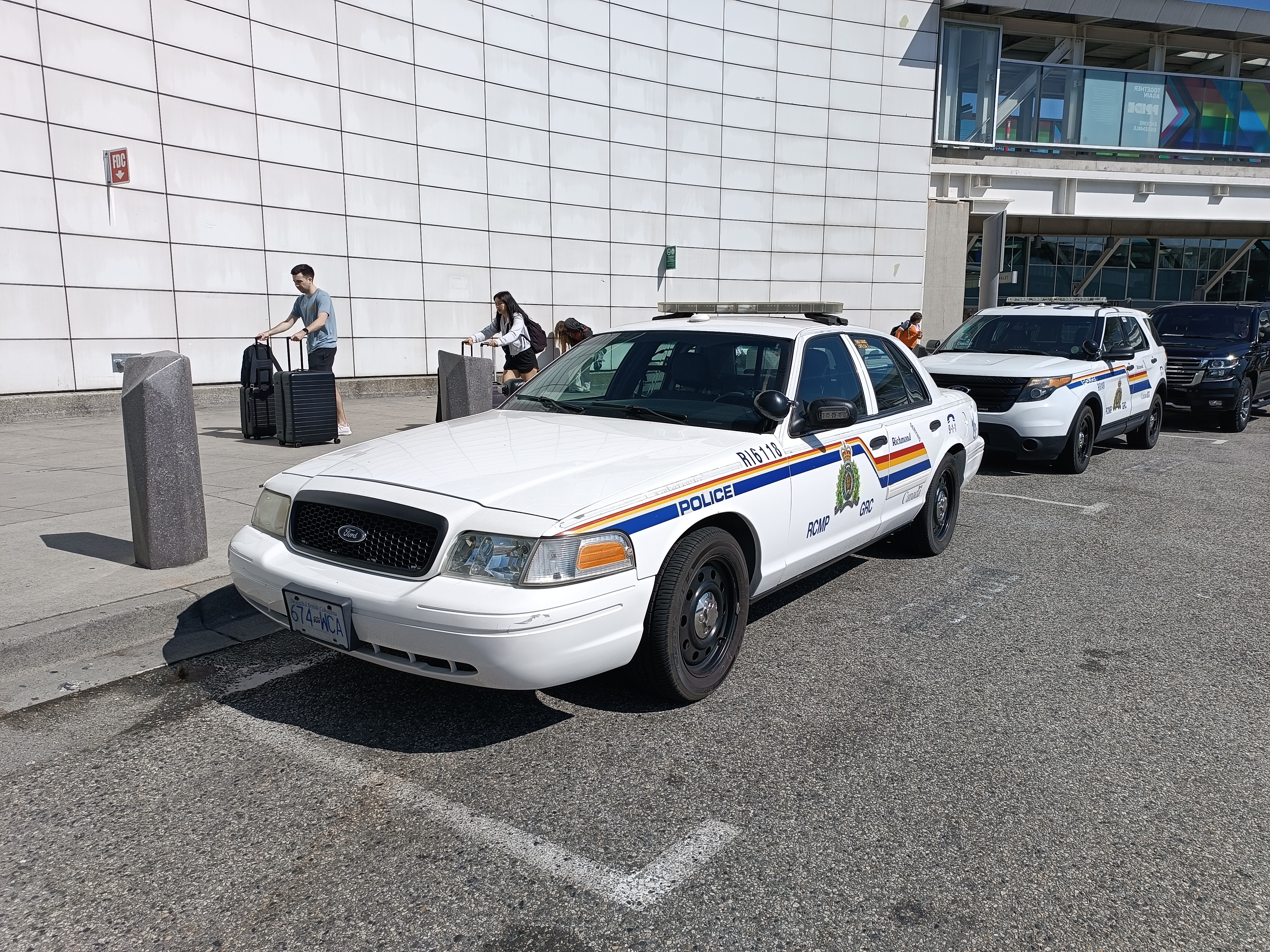
Ford police vehicles white patrol car used by the Royal Canadian Mounted Police

Police vehicles in the United States and Canada consist of a wide range of marked, slicktop, stealth, and unmarked patrol cars used by municipal/local police departments, county police or sheriff’s offices/departments, state police and highway patrol, and federal law enforcement agencies in the United States and Canada. Most police cars in both countries are produced by American automakers, primarily the Big Three (GM, Ford, and Chrysler), and many vehicle models and fleet norms have been shared by police in both countries.

Officially marketed American and Canadian police vehicles—as in those officially marketed as such by their manufacturer—are typically classified as pursuit packages, which generally denote vehicle models that are capable of handling a majority of police tasks, primarily regular patrol duties but also, as the name implies, pursuits. Other models are often classified as special service packages, which generally denote specialized vehicles designed to fulfill specific tasks or utility roles, such as sedans, SUVs, pickup trucks, SWAT vehicles, transport vans, and performance cars. Combined, these police fleet offerings are often referred to by manufacturers as police packages.

Unlike other countries, American and Canadian law enforcement agencies are generally not limited by regulations on vehicle models or livery designs, meaning that, while there may be varying regulations on emergency vehicle equipment or unmarked police vehicles in each jurisdiction, there is no standardized vehicle livery design across either local or municipal, county, state or province, and national or federal agencies have their own unique designs.

== History ==
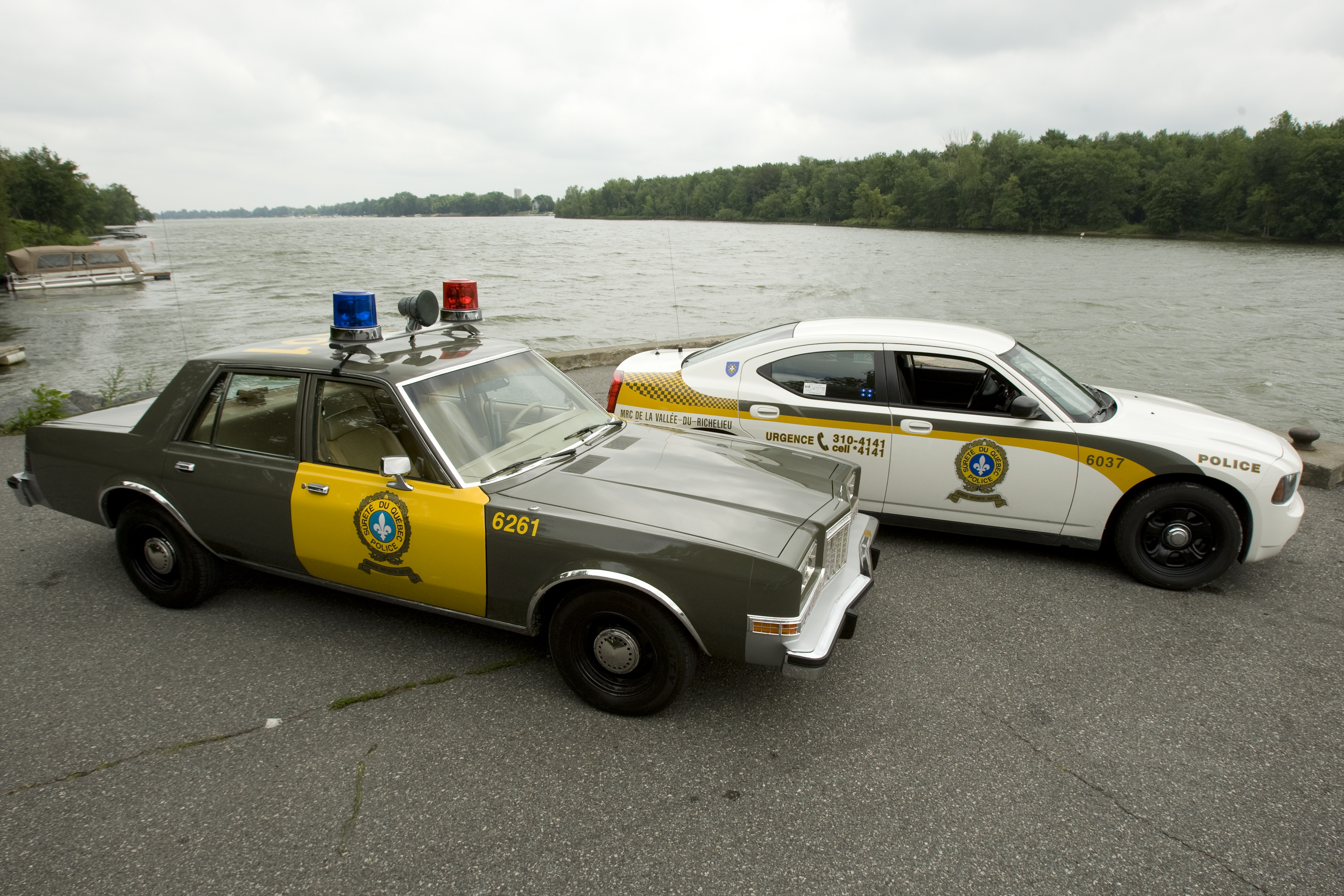
A Plymouth Gran Fury and Dodge Charger LX, both formerly used by the Sûreté du Québec

The first police car in the world was an electrically powered wagon, operated by the Akron Police Department in 1899. The $2,400 vehicle was equipped with electric lights, gongs, and a stretcher, and could reach 16 mph (26 km/h) and travel 30 mi (48 km) before its battery needed to be recharged. The car's first assignment was to pick up a drunken man at the junction of Main and Exchange streets. Since the 1920s, the New York City Police Department has used vehicles for patrol duties, referred to as "Radio Motor Patrol" vehicles.

Ford's introduction of the flathead V-8 in its Model 18 in 1932—the first low-priced, mass-marketed car with a V8 engine—proved popular amongst police departments and led to strong brand loyalty. In turn, this gave the company a market-capturing edge that lasted until 1968. In the 1940s and 1950s, the "Big Three" (Ford, General Motors, and Chrysler) began to offer specialized police packages with severe duty parts. Foremost amongst these was the Ford package of 1950, which utilized the larger and more powerful Mercury engine in the smaller, lighter Ford. This ended the practice of some state police forces buying larger and more powerful, but higher-priced models including Buicks, Hudsons, and Chryslers. In 1969, Plymouth took first place in the police market, with Chrysler's 440 cu. in. V8s, Torqueflite transmissions, and torsion bar suspensions giving them a compelling advantage. Chrysler held this lead until the 1970s energy crisis drove buyers to smaller cars, and Chrysler subsequently discontinued their rear-drive platform after the 1989 model year.

Police have historically used full-size, low-expense sedans since the days of the Ford Model A, though many police departments switched to intermediates—such as the Plymouth Satellite, Ford Torino, and AMC Matador—in the 1960s and 1970s. Some state police forces adopted pony cars, such as the Ford Mustang, Chevrolet Camaro, and AMC Javelin, for use as pursuit vehicles. The Ford LTD, Dodge Diplomat, Plymouth Gran Fury, and Chevrolet Caprice were re-adopted as standard when the models were downsized in the late 1970s and 1980s.

After the discontinuation of the Chevrolet Caprice in 1996, the Ford Crown Victoria Police Interceptor replaced it, becoming iconic as a police car due to its prevalence in fleets across North America. Other models such as the Chevrolet Impala (8th and 9th generations), Chevrolet Tahoe, and Dodge Charger also gained a percentage of the market during this period, and were often bought to diversify fleets and minimize disruption in the event of a Ford recall.

Following the discontinuation of the Crown Victoria, Ford replaced their fleet offerings with police versions of the Ford Taurus and Ford Explorer, which remained popular with fleets. General Motors marketed a revived Chevrolet Caprice as a fleet-only vehicle alongside a fleet-only 9th-generation Impala, while Dodge continued marketing their Charger, which was viewed as a viable sedan replacement for the Crown Victoria.

With the discontinuation of the Taurus, Impala, and Caprice, the police fleet market as of 2022 is dominated by crossovers and SUVs, with the Ford Explorer, Chevrolet Tahoe, and Dodge Durango predominantly marketed alongside similar models. The last sedan marketed for police fleets was the Dodge Charger, which was discontinued in late 2023.

== Common vehicles ==
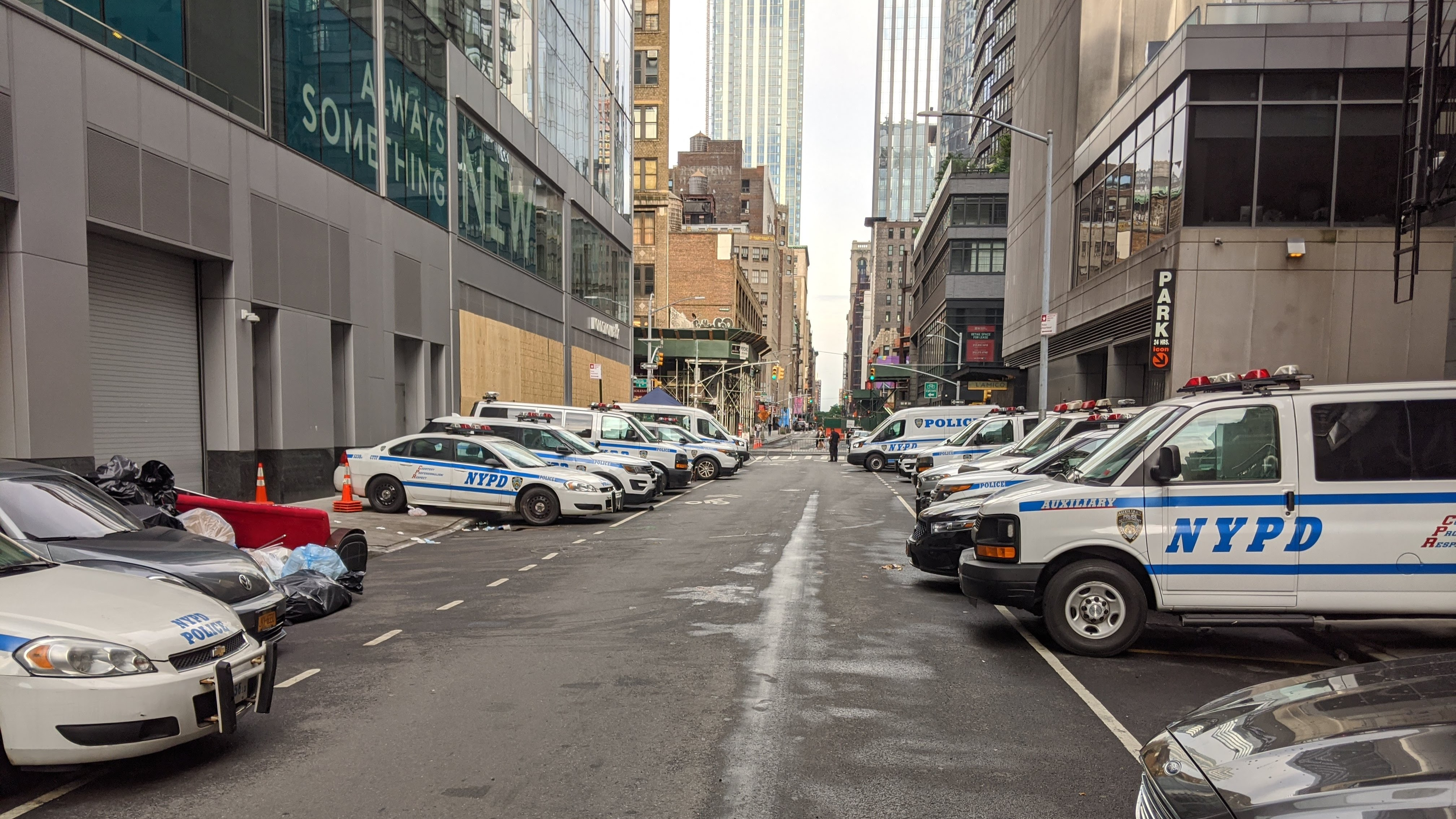
Several New York City Police Department vehicles parked on 30th Street in Manhattan

Subject to federal, state, provincial and local laws, any vehicle, appropriately modified, can be used as a police vehicle, but the most common are those designed or modified by manufacturers as police or special service vehicles. Though previously dominated by sedans, sport utility vehicles and crossovers have become increasingly popular in police fleets, reflecting wider vehicle market trends. Benefits often cited include extra room for equipment and better outward visibility due to the higher seating position compared to sedans.

The following model year 2020 and 2021 vehicles (in various drivetrain configurations) were submitted by manufacturers for the 2021 evaluation by the Michigan State Police:

- 2021 Chevrolet Tahoe PPV (RWD and 4WD)
- 2021 Dodge Charger Pursuit (AWD and RWD)
- 2021 Dodge Durango Pursuit
- 2020 Ford Police Interceptor Utility (based on the 2020 Ford Explorer)
- 2021 Ford F-150 Police Responder

Other police fleet vehicles available from the same manufacturers during those model years include the Ford Expedition, Chevrolet Suburban, Chevrolet Silverado, Chevrolet Express, Ford Transit, and Ram 1500. Older models, namely the Ford Crown Victoria, Chevrolet Impala, Chevrolet Caprice, and Ford Taurus, retain their popularity in fleets, but are gradually being phased out due to maintenance costs, mileage, and their end of production.

Common SWAT vehicles include the Lenco BearCat, BAE Caiman, and other armored vehicles of similar configurations.

=== Other vehicles ===
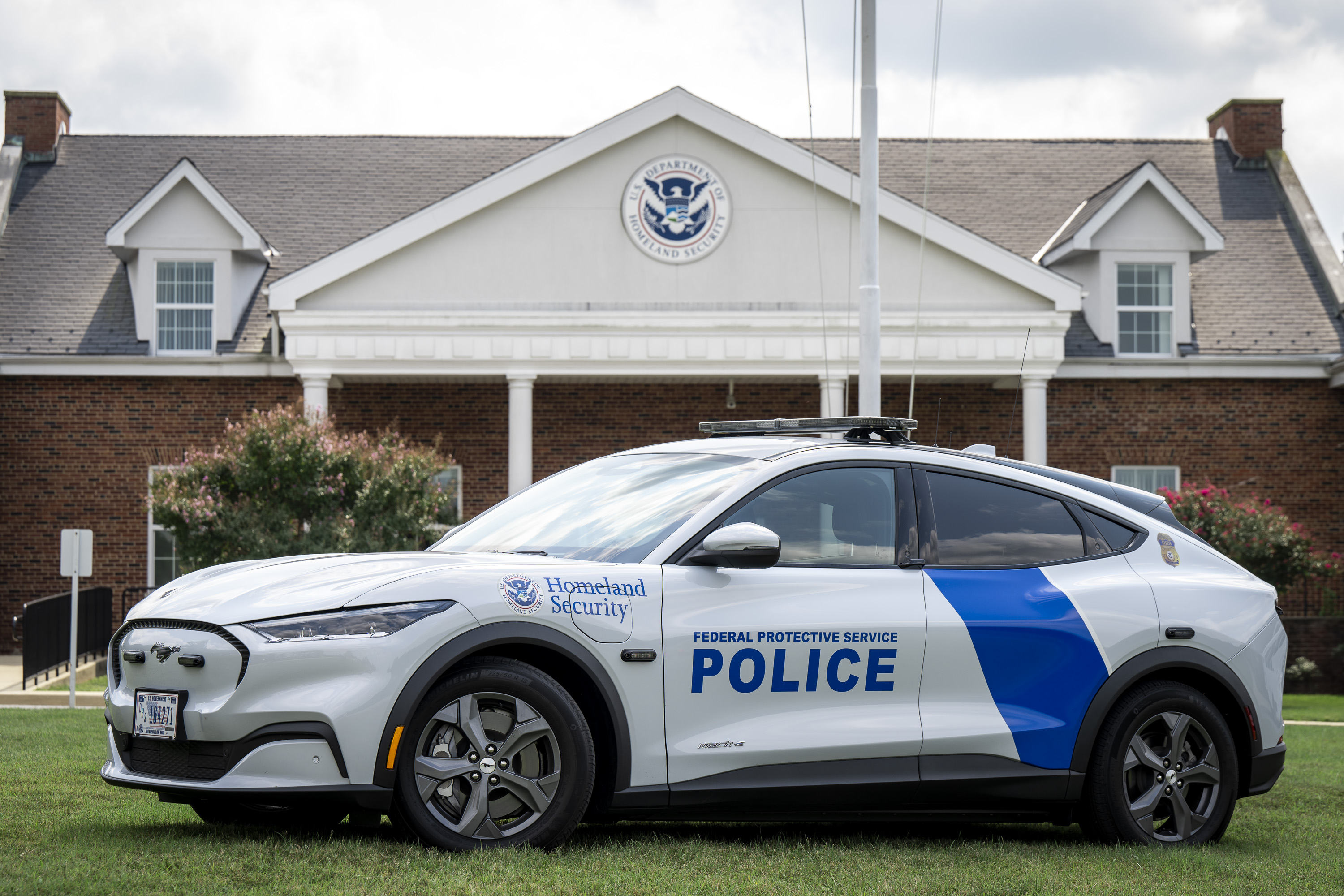
A Ford Mustang Mach-E used by the United States Department of Homeland Security Federal Protective Service

Other vehicles are used in varying capacities by some agencies, such as the Toyota Prius, Smart Fortwo, BMW i3, and other models that are not officially sold to fleets.

Electric vehicles have gradually become more prevalent in police fleets as electric vehicles become increasingly popular. In 2017, when Fremont Police Department purchased a Tesla Model S for patrol duty, making it the first Tesla police car in the world; since then, electric vehicles have been added to police fleets in Boulder City, Dearborn, Hallandale Beach, and New York City, among other departments. The first Tesla police car in Canada was purchased by the Bridgewater Police Service in 2022; later that year, the Royal Canadian Mounted Police announced they would be acquiring a Tesla Model Y, their first electric police car, in 2023. Since 2024, automakers have officially announced and released police packages for their electric vehicles, such as the Chevy Blazer PPV and F-150 Lightning SSV.

Classic police cars may also remain in service, often out of heritage or community appeal. these vehicles are often only used at events or parades, and are not used in frontline patrol duty. However, this is not always the case; for instance, the McHenry County Sheriff's Department operates a retrofitted 1995 Chevrolet Caprice for regular patrol duties as of 2016.

==== Performance cars ====
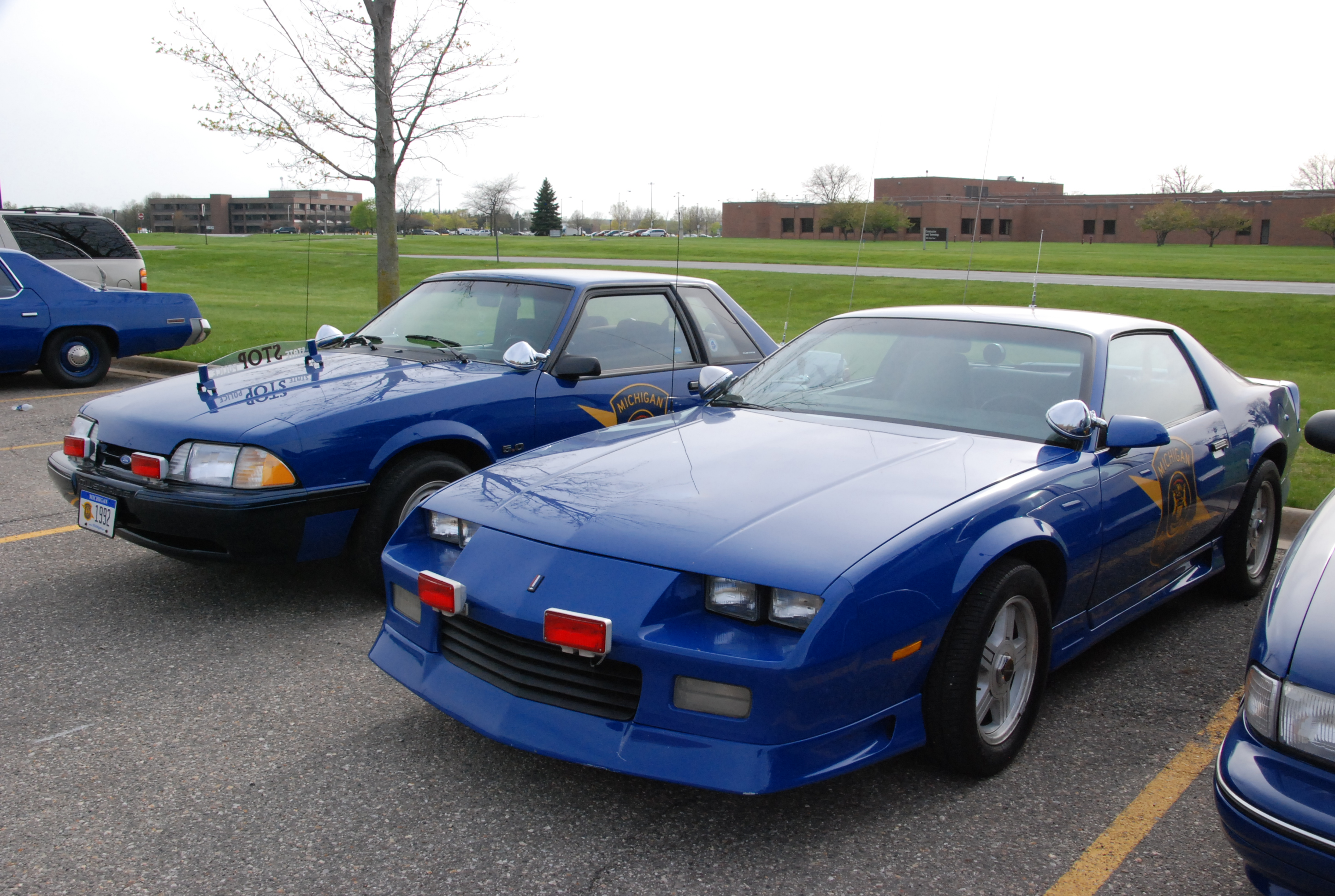
A Ford Mustang SSP and Chevrolet Camaro B4C formerly used by the Michigan State Police in the 1990s

Some police forces in the United States and Canada use performance cars in some roles. They are generally rare among police forces, and are often a single vehicle that was seized from a criminal or donated by a benefactor, usually wealthy supporters in their jurisdiction or local car dealerships. Contrary to popular belief, they do not respond to regular calls, conduct regular patrols, or take part in pursuits; rather, they are almost always used for promotional purposes or as part of community policing efforts. In the rare instance where the vehicle is used as a patrol vehicle, it is almost always a less-expensive vehicle used for limited traffic enforcement or highway patrol, and they are sometimes used in a slicktop, unmarked, or stealth configuration to exploit the unexpectedness of their use as a police car. In some instances, the vehicle is not used by the police at all but is made as a tribute to them, or the vehicle is only used for a limited time before being sold at auction.

The vehicle models used typically vary but are usually muscle cars such as the Chevrolet Camaro, Dodge Challenger, and Ford Mustang, though sports cars such as the Chevrolet Corvette, Nissan GT-R, and various Ferrari models have also been used in some instances. Historically, dedicated police packages existed for performance cars, such as the Ford Mustang SSP and Chevrolet Camaro B4C, though they were uncommon and their use largely ceased into the 2000s.

==== D.A.R.E. cars ====
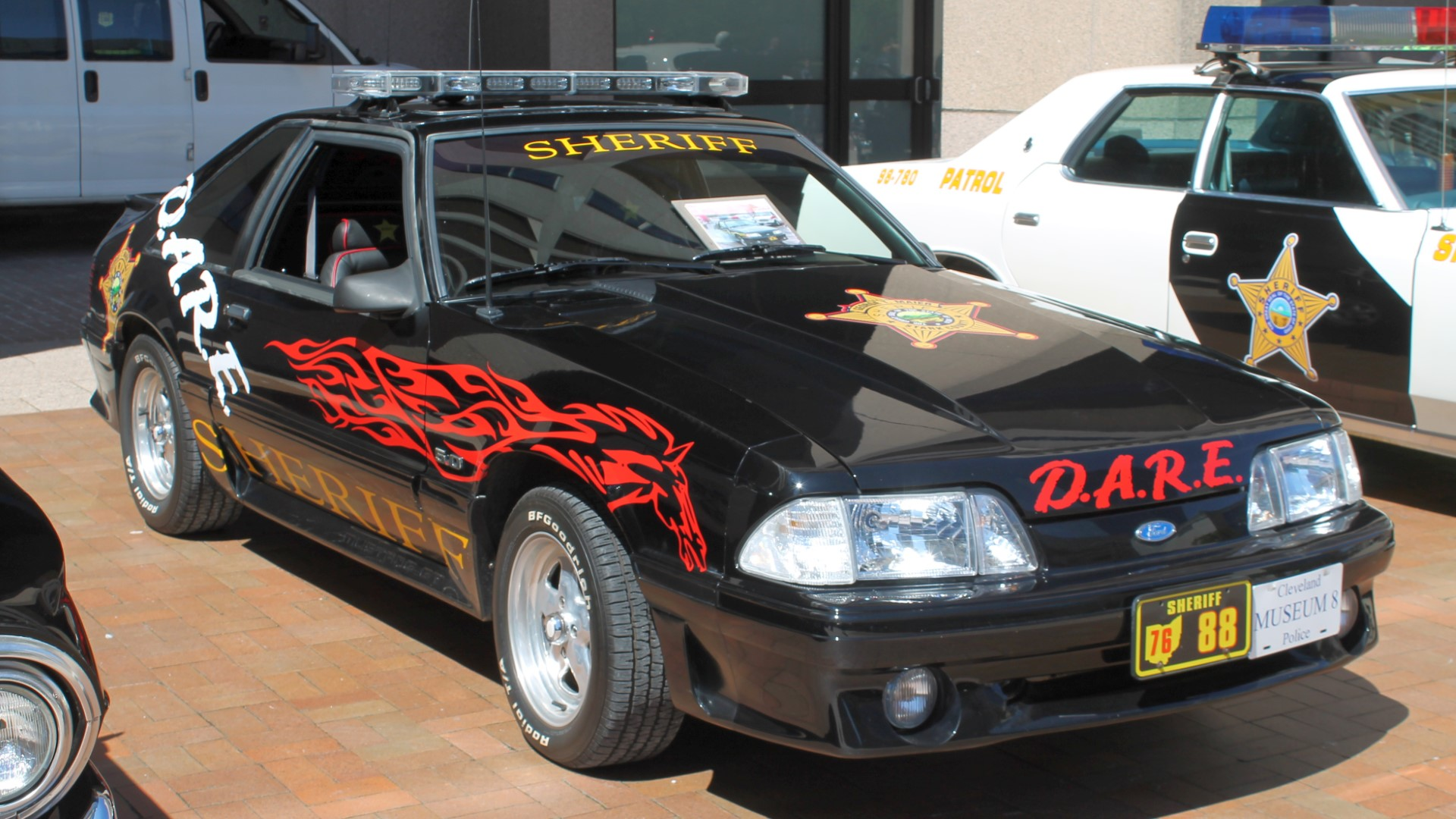
A Ford Mustang D.A.R.E. vehicle used by the Stark County Sheriff's Office

A number of Drug Abuse Resistance Education (D.A.R.E.) programs in American police departments have vehicles marked as police cars to promote the program. These "D.A.R.E. cars" are vehicles that have been seized from drug dealers and converted into a police vehicle. They are used to send the message that drug dealers forfeit all their glamorous trappings when they get caught. Traditionally, these vehicles are expensive, luxury, or performance cars, though more recent examples are simply police fleet vehicles with D.A.R.E. liveries.

== Appearance ==
=== Marked patrol cars ===
A roof number on the top of a Ford Police Interceptor Sedan used by the New York State Police

A roof number on the top of a Ford Crown Victoria Police Interceptor used by the MPDC

Marked police vehicles in the United States and Canada, the livery design for each fleet is usually determined by each individual agency; only Minnesota and Ohio have legislation with specific outlines for what police vehicle liveries should look like. Usually, laws exist that establish standards for police vehicle markings and prohibit civilian vehicles from using certain markings or paint schemes that may resemble emergency vehicles, as is the case in California.

Livery designs vary by jurisdiction. The side doors, hood, or trunk of a marked police car usually bear the seal or badge of the agency, federal, state, county, or municipal, often in reflective finish. Markings such as emergency phone numbers (911), department mottoes, or website URLs are also common. Some agencies have identification numbers printed on the roofs of patrol cars for tracking of aircraft, or to distinguish specialized units, such as K-9 units or police dog vehicles.

Emergency vehicle equipment, such as emergency lights (Federal Signal, Whelen, and Code 3), pushbars, spotlights, seat partitions, window bars, and hubcaps, vary with each department or service, and may be inconsistent depending on the cruiser's model, purpose, and time of commissioning. North American police cars are historically associated with being painted black and white—specifically, with the doors and roof painted white and the rest of the body painted black. Older police vehicles typically came from the factory painted in a single color, most often white or black. The contrasting black-and-white paint scheme was used to make police vehicles easily stand out from civilian vehicles without requiring bright paint colors, custom designs, graphics, or larger markings. The association between North American police and black-and-white color schemes is so strong that the United States Department of Homeland Security recommends, but does not require, that local law enforcement agencies adopt a black-and-white vehicle color scheme for ease of visual identification nationwide.

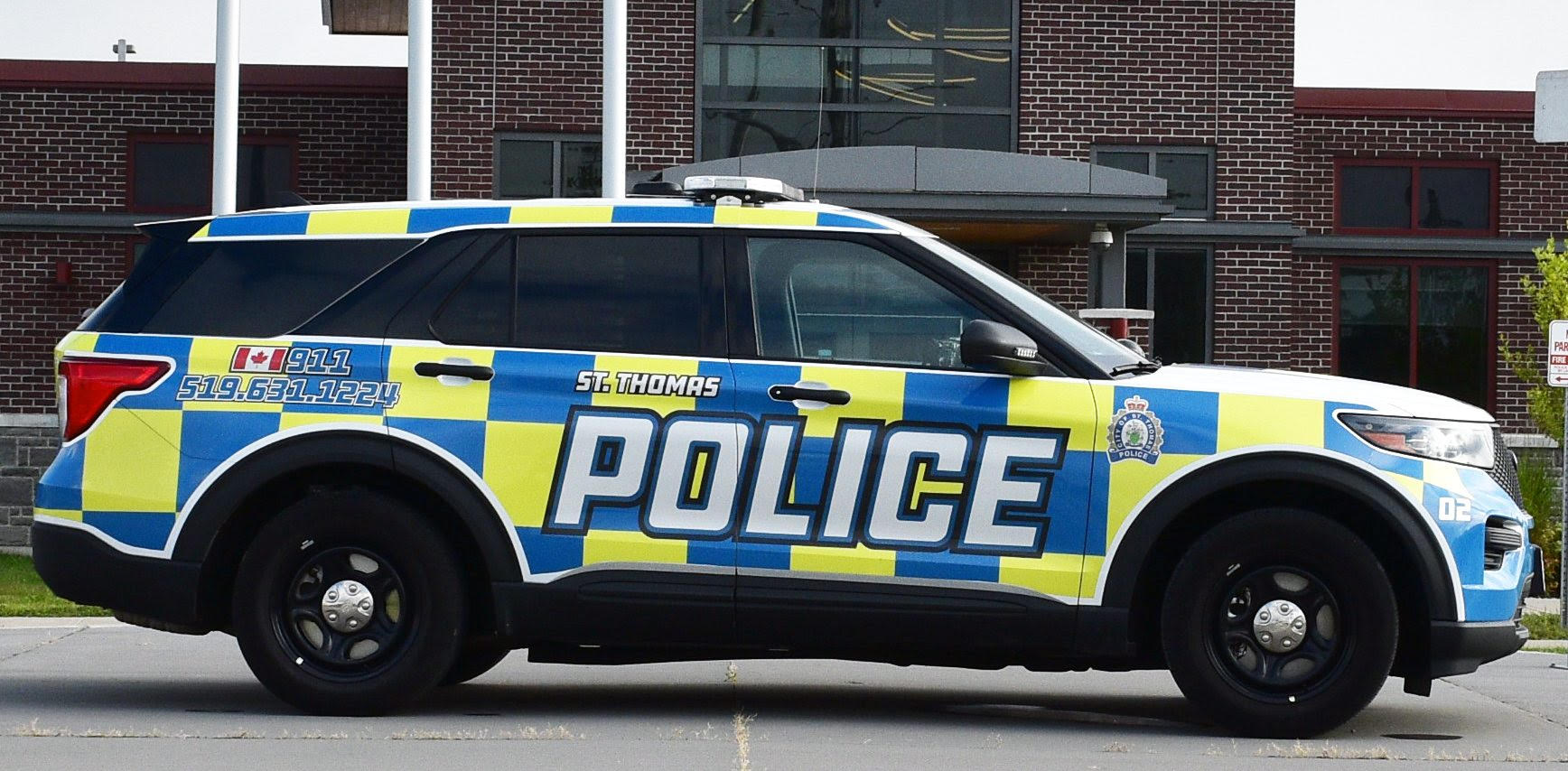
A Ford Police Interceptor Utility with the St. Thomas Police Service, with Battenburg markings on the sides

Unlike other countries, Battenburg markings are very rare on emergency vehicles in the United States and Canada. However, this does not mean they are completely nonexistent in North America; a few regional police services in Ontario, namely those in St. Thomas, Barrie and Cobourg, have adopted yellow and blue Battenburg marking designs on some newer cruisers, although this practice is uncommon in the two countries.

A Chevrolet Caprice 9C1 black-and-white used by the Ontario Provincial Police until the 1980s

While black and white designs are used in many jurisdictions, many modern police cars use solid colors, primarily neutral tones such as white, black, blue, and grey, often out of budgetary concerns; for example, the NYPD switched from blue to white in the late 1990s to save money on painting costs. Other colors, such as shades of blue, green, brown, tan, and red, are used by a handful of other agencies. In Canada, yellow was a common color used by municipal and regional police in Ontario until the 1980s; like the NYPD, most police services switched to white paint to save money.

Most modern fleet markings are created from reflective vinyl with an adhesive backing that is applied in a peel-and-stick manner. Colors chosen to represent the agency's identity are typically chosen by the individual department, although some states have specific guidelines for color schemes and markings. Vinyl used to produce fleets markings comes in large rolls that are fed through a plotter (cutter) or large-format printer/cutter. The designs are created in specialized computer software and sent to the machines via a cable link for production. Once the design is cut into the vinyl, the excess vinyl on the sheet is removed in a process called "weeding". Finally, a paper pre-mask is applied to the top of the vinyl design to allow easy application of multiple letters and shapes at one time.

=== Unmarked, stealth, and slicktop patrol cars ===
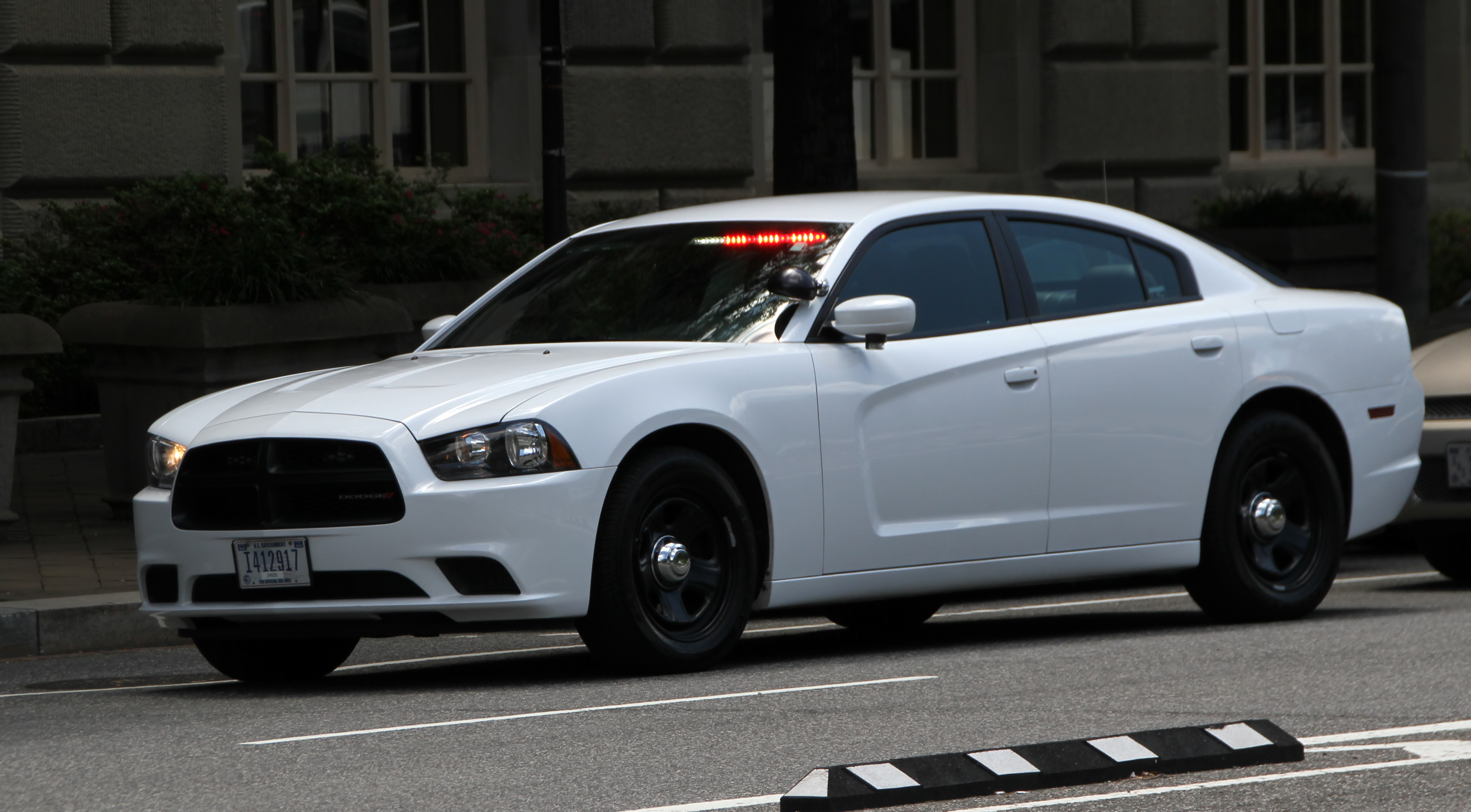
Dodge Charger Pursuit unmarked car used by the FBI

Unmarked police vehicles are common in most federal agencies in the United States and Canada. Most "unmarked cars" or "undercover cars" are often the same models as marked fleet vehicles, and may be virtually identical to them aside from the lack of roof-mounted emergency lights; however, this depends on the agency, and some may use common civilian vehicle models to blend in with traffic.

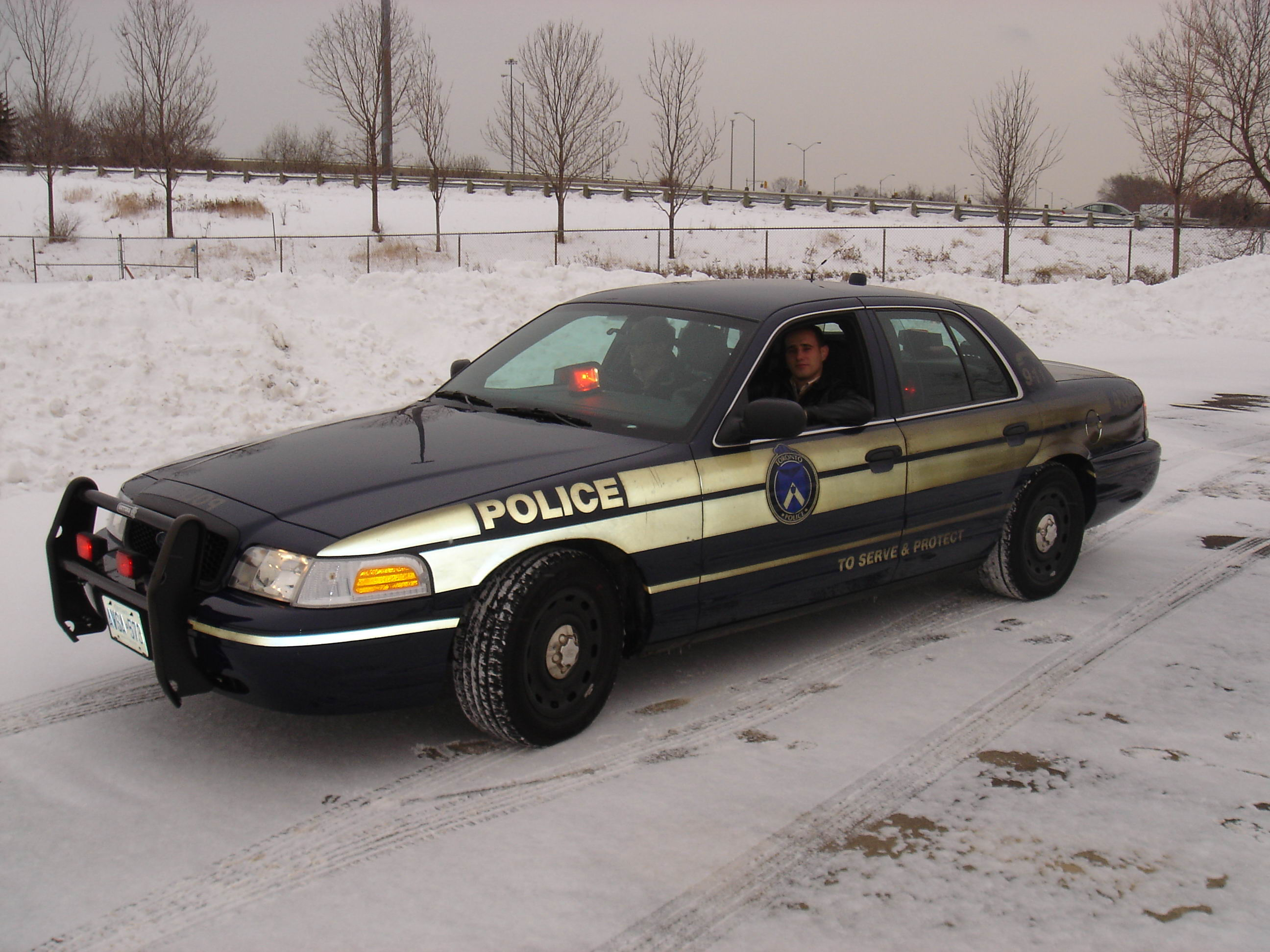
A Ford Crown Victoria Police Interceptor ghost car used by the Toronto Police Service. A light is being shined on the front fender of the vehicle, making the white reflective livery visible; otherwise, the vehicle would appear fully black, as seen at the rear fender.

Many agencies also use "ghost cars" or "stealth cars", which are similar to unmarked cars, but have reflective graphics that are difficult to see unless illuminated by lights or viewed at certain angles. Ghost cars are often used for traffic enforcement, though they may also be used in jurisdictions where traditional unmarked cars are prohibited or have their enforcement capabilities limited, such as being unable to conduct traffic stops.

Unmarked, stealth, and slicktop patrol cars are controversial. Proponents argue they help deter illegal driving and keep undercover officers safe from detection, while detractors argue they unfairly focus on issuing tickets and make police less visible on patrol. There are also concerns that the existence of unmarked cars enables police impersonators due to the ease in copying an unmarked car as opposed to a marked patrol car.

A Ford Crown Victoria Police Interceptor used by the California Highway Patrol on the called a "slicktop", has internally-mounted lighting.

The "slicktop cars" mount their emergency lights within the cruiser, the police cars do not have roof mounted lightbars, generally around the periphery of the windshield or into the leading or trailing edge of the roof. Slicktop police cars also lack the silhouette of a lightbar or dashlight beacon.

== See also ==
- Police car
- Ford police vehicles
- Dodge Police Pursuit
- Chevrolet 9C1
- Policing in Canada
- Policing in the United States
- Police vehicles equipped with automated external defibrillators in North America
