= Laval Police Service =

Police service in Laval, Quebec, Canada

Laval Police Service Service de police de Laval
- Motto: Servir et Protéger; Serve and Protect

Agency overview
- Formed: 1965

Operational structure
- Headquarters: Laval, Quebec
- Sworn members: 615 (2020)
- Unsworn members: 250 (2020)
- Elected officer responsible: Lise Thériault, Ministre de la Sécurité publique
- Divisions: 14

Website
- Official website

The Service de police de Laval (French for Laval Police Service, pronounced [sɛʁvis də pɔlis də laval]) is the municipal police force of the city of Laval, Quebec, north of Montreal. The service consists of approximately 800 officers and civilian employees.

== Officer fatalities ==
The force has suffered two high-profile officer deaths in the line of duty in recent years. Constable Valerie Gignac, 25, was shot and killed shortly after arriving on the scene of an argument in Laval-des-Rapides on December 14, 2005. The suspect, François Pépin, had a history of mental illness, and owned a hunting rifle despite the fact he was under a firearms ban. He was known to police and had been charged before the incident with stalking another female constable.

Pépin was charged with first-degree murder in accordance with Canadian law, which stipulates this as the automatic charge in response to killing a police officer. At his trial in 2008, he pled guilty to second-degree murder and received an automatic life sentence.

On March 2, 2007, the force suffered a second loss when Constable Daniel Tessier was killed while executing a drug raid in the city of Brossard. Tessier, who was a 17-year veteran of the force, had joined the drug squad a few days prior to his death. His alleged killer, Basil Parasiris, was charged with first-degree murder but maintained that he was unaware it was a police raid and that he was acting in self-defence. He was acquitted on June 13, 2008, for reason of self-defence.

== Automated external defibrillators ==
In 2012 the Service de police de Laval purchased 22 automated external defibrillators (AED) which saved 14 lives in less than 2 years. The Service de police de Laval then acquired an additional 48 AEDs. These combined 70 AEDs allow for an AED to be placed in every patrol car and community police centre.

== Organization ==
The head of the force is Chief Pierre Brochet.

The rank structure and current strength is:

- Director (directeur)
- Associate director (directeur-adjoint)
- Assistant director (assistant-directeur)
- Chief inspector (inspecteur chef)
- Inspector (inspecteur)
- Lieutenant / detective lieutenant (lieutenant/lieutenant détective)
- Sergeant / detective sergeant (sergent/sergent détective)
- Constable (agent)

There are six postes de quartier (community police stations) situated across the city of Laval:

- CPS/PDQ 1 - Saint-François, Saint-Vincent-de Paul and Île Duvernay
- CPS/PDQ 2 - Pont-Viau, Duvernay, Laval-des-Rapides
- CPS/PDQ 3 - Chomedey
- CPS/PDQ 4 - Laval-West, Laval sur le lac and Sainte-Dorothée
- CPS/PDQ 5 - Sainte-Rose and Fabreville
- CPS/PDQ 6 - Vimont et Auteuil

== See also ==
- Service de police de la Ville de Montréal
