= Police vehicles equipped with automated external defibrillators in North America =

Every year sudden cardiac arrest (SCA) kills between 35,000 and 45,000 people in Canada and approximately 350,000 people in the United States; 85% of SCAs are caused by ventricular fibrillation (VF). Receiving defibrillation from an automated external defibrillator (AED) is a key component of the 'chain of survival' for victims of SCA. Chances of survival from a SCA decrease by 7–10% every minute that a victim does not receive defibrillation. Attempts at reducing time until defibrillation have largely focused on improving traditional emergency medical service (EMS) responders and implementing publicly available defibrillator (PAD) programs. In the United States approximately 60% of SCAs are treated by EMS. Equipping police vehicles with AEDs and incorporating them in the emergency dispatching process when a SCA is suspected, can reduce the time until defibrillation for a victim suffering an out-of-hospital sudden cardiac arrest. There are numerous studies which confirm a strong coloration between equipping police vehicles with AEDs and reduced time until defibrillation which ultimately translates into improved survival rates from SCA. As a result of these demonstrable statistics, police departments across North America have begun equipping some or all of their police vehicles with AEDs.

== United States ==
In the 1990s three extensive studies, which examined different elements of police AED programs, occurred in Allegheny County, PA; Rochester, MN; and Miami, FL. The purpose of these studies was to examine the effectiveness of equipping police with AEDs, their ability to provide reduced response times in rural and suburban communities and how this translates to improved survival rates from SCA. The police departments which originally took part in these studies retained their adopted capabilities and now contribute to some of the highest survival rates from SCA in the country.

=== Allegheny County, PA ===
Between 1 January 1990, and 31 January 1995, a study was conducted across 7 rural municipalities in Allegheny County, Pennsylvania. This study examined the impact of dispatching police officers who were equipped with AEDs, to suspected SCAs, on survival rates from SCA in rural communities. In total, 200 police officers received CPR and AED training and 30 AEDs were deployed. Over the course of the study a 3.5 minute (51%) decrease in the interval between the 9-1-1 call and the application of the AED was observed. The study concluded that in the "7 suburban communities, police use of AEDs decreased time to defibrillation and was an independent predictor of survival to hospital discharge."

=== Rochester, MN ===
In November 1990, the Rochester Minnesota Police Department received 4 defibrillators to equip 4 patrol vehicles. This initiative began as a part of a study to examine how effective police vehicles that were equipped with AEDs were at improving survival rates from SCA. The number of AEDs grew until in 2006, every marked police vehicle in the department had an AED. As of September 2011, this program has saved over 142 lives. As of September 2013, Rochester Minnesota achieved a survival rate from SCA of 58%, which is due to their Police AED Program.

=== Miami Dade County, FL ===
In 1999 the Miami Dade Police Department partnered with the Metropolitan Miami-Dade County Public Health Trust and the Miami Heart Research Institute to examine the impact of police responders in combination with EMS on response times and survival rates from SCA. In 1999, between 1 February and 1 July, all Miami-Dade police officers were equipped with AEDs. This program involved 1900 police officers across 9 districts. The Metropolitan Miami-Dada County 9-1-1 emergency dispatching system was adjusted to accommodate a dual dispatching process. The results of this study indicated that dispatching police officers equipped with AEDs simultaneously with traditional EMS, in a large urban area can provide substantially reduced response times. This improved response time directly related to improved survival rates for victims of SCA with ventricular fibrillation or pulseless ventricular tachycardia (VF/VT). During this experiment, the survival rate for witnessed victims of SCA with VT/VF who were assisted by simultaneously dispatched police and EMS was 24%. The survival rate for witnessed victims of SCA with VT/VF who were assisted by EMS alone was 10.5%. The results of these studies have influenced many police departments throughout North America to adopt similar defibrillator programs for their vehicles.

=== Police departments in the United States which equip their patrol vehicles with automated external defibrillators ===
State	Police department	Number of AEDs	Date police AED program started	Number of lives saved	Regional SCA survival rate	Additional information
Arizona	The Marana Police Department	15	N/A	N/A	N/A	The AEDs were donated by the Steven M. Gootter Foundation.
Arizona	The Pima County Sheriff's Department	26	2014	N/A	N/A	The 26 AEDs are in the vehicles of sergeants who are patrol shift supervisors. The Pima County Sheriff's Department also equips the SWAT Team, Bomb Squad and Search and Rescue teams with mobile AEDs. The department's total number of mobile and stationary AEDs is 78.
California	The Glendora Police Department	15	1997	31	N/A	In 1997, the Glendora Police Department became the first police department in Los Angeles County and the second police department in California to deploy AEDs among all of their police cruisers. There are 15 AEDs which equip all Glendora Police marked police cruisers. The program was expanded to include AEDs for all the non-sworn Community Services Officers and non-sworn voluntary Auxiliary Officers within the Glendora Police Department.
California	Westminster Police Department	33	2015	N/A	NA	
Florida	Flagler County Sheriff's Office	80	2013	N/A	N/A	The 80 AEDs will be placed in the vehicles of the Sheriff's Office fleet, including motorcycles.
Florida	Groveland Police Department	A defibrillator in every active patrol vehicle	2007	N/A	N/A	N/A
Florida	Lakeland Police Department	131 defibrillators distributed among marked police vehicles	N/A	N/A	N/A	The funds for the defibrillators were raised through donations by members of the public. Between 400 and 500 people donated money which totaled $122,500.
Florida	Miami Dade Police Department	1900 patrol vehicles, marine units, mounted units, helicopters and bicycle patrols were all equipped with AEDs.	1999	N/A	N/A	The patrol officers of the Miami Dade Police Department take their police vehicles (with AED) home when off duty which allows the AED to remain available to the community at all time.
Georgia	Brookhaven Police Department	64	2013	N/A	N/A	The Friends of Brookhaven Foundation raised the funds, which were matched dollar for dollar by the City of Brookhaven, to purchase the 64 AEDs. These AEDs are issued to all patrol vehicles of the Brookhaven Police Department.
Georgia	The Floyd County Police Department	68	2010	N/A	N/A	These 68 AEDs were purchased with a $144,000 HRSA grant through the Georgia Department of Community Health.
Georgia	Rome Police Department	44	2009	N/A	N/A	N/A
Kansas	Lawrence Police Department	45	N/A	N/A	N/A	In 2012, the Lawrence Police Foundation began a long term fundraising project to raise $47,000 to acquire 34 AEDs for the Lawrence Police Service. The Lawrence Police Department, prior to 2012 already had 11 AEDs, needed an additional 34 to equip all of their patrol vehicles. This goal was completed on 24 December 2014.
Louisiana	The Houma Police Department	18	2005	N/A	N/A	In 2005 the Houma Police Department received 8 AEDs in 2005 and an additional 10 in 2015. These 18 AEDs are distributed among officers while on patrol.
Massachusetts	Massachusetts State Police	323	2004	N/A	N/A	78 of the 323 AEDs are in fixed locations such as stations and training facilities. The rest of the AEDs are issued to individual state troopers.
Minnesota	Minnesota State Patrol	499	2007	N/A	N/A	Every state patrol vehicle is equipped with an AED.
Minnesota	Rochester Police Department	One AED in every Police Patrol vehicle	1990	As of September 2011, this program has saved over 142 lives.	SCA survival rate in Rochester MN is 58%.	
Montana	Gallatin County Sheriff's Office	37	N/A	N/A	20%	The Gallatin County Sheriff's Office purchased 28 of their 37 AEDs with finances from their jail revenue and now have AEDs in all of the Sheriff's Office patrol vehicles.
New Jersey	Statewide Deployment in police vehicles	1682	2003	N/A	SCA survival rate for the State of New Jersey is 4%.	In May 2003, The American Red Cross of Central New Jersey partnered with the New Jersey State Police Community Affairs Bureau to initiate a process that would provide CPR and AED training to hundreds of New Jersey state troopers. Twenty state troopers were also certified as CPR and AED instructors so that the department would be self-sufficient in retraining its officers. Several AEDs (between 3-5 units) were issued to eleven state police stations which were to be issued to patrol vehicles. In July 2005 The state of New Jersey purchased 1,682 AEDs to further equip police patrol vehicles across the state. This event is one of the largest single deployment of AEDs in the United States.
New York	New York State Police	1400	2007	170	N/A	In 2007 the New York State Police Department equipped all marked cruisers with AEDs (1400) and placed an additional 300 AEDs in state police facilities. The New York State Police officers have been successful in 15% of saves involving SCA and AEDs.
Ohio	Geauga County Sheriff's Office	15	N/A	N/A	N/A	The 15 new AEDs were donated by the University Hospitals Geauga Medical Center. These AEDs were donated in exchange for the Sheriff's Office existing AEDs, which required updating. The updated AEDs were then donated to local libraries and senior centers.

== Canada ==
Several police departments in Canada equip their patrol vehicles with defibrillators; however, this practice remains inconsistent. Within the Royal Canadian Mounted Police (RCMP) there are no federal regulations that necessitate equipping RCMP vehicles or detachments with AEDs. Despite this there are currently four departments within the RCMP which do deploy AEDs. These departments are the Prime Minister Protective Detail, the Emergency Medical Response Team (EMRT), the Division Fitness and Lifestyle and "E" Division.

E Division of the RCMP operates in the province of British Columbia and is responsible for federal, provincial and municipal policing services throughout the province, with the exception of 11 communities. Despite the absence of federal regulations requiring RCMP officers to be equipped with AEDs, the BC Provincial Policing Standards state that, as of 30 January 2013, "the chief constable, chief officer, or commissioner must:

(1) Ensure that, for a rural police force that provides policing to a jurisdiction of less than 5,000 population, Conducted Energy Weapon (CEW) operators who have been assigned a CEW while on‐duty must also be equipped with an AED that is to be carried in their police vehicle.
(2) Ensure that, for an urban police force that provides policing to a municipality of greater than 5,000 population, all on‐road patrol supervisors must be equipped with AEDs that are to be carried in their police vehicles.
(3) Ensure that all officers who are authorized to use an AED receive and maintain training in accordance with Emergency and Health Services Commission consent requirements for police use of an AED."

The BC Provincial Policing Standards were updated to include the clause related to AEDs, after the release of the Braidwood Inquiry. The Braidwood Inquiry was a public inquiry which examined the safety of Tasers or CEWs after the death of Robert Dziekański. Robert Dziekański died after being tasered 5 times by RCMP officers. In August 2014 Constable Brian Mulrooney, an RCMP officer from "E" Division who was equipped with an AED, was dispatched to a suspected sudden cardiac arrest at Snug Cove, Bowen Island. Constable Mulrooney arrived within 2–3 minutes with the AED and administered multiple shocks to the victim. The victim was revived and flown to the Vancouver General hospital for further assistance.

In Canada there are three provincial police departments; the Ontario Provincial Police (OPP), the Sûreté du Québec and the Royal Newfoundland Constabulary (RNC). None of the three provincial police departments equip their police cruisers with AEDs, for the purpose of responding to suspected SCAs; however, many municipal police departments equip their police cruisers with AEDs and incorporate them in the emergency response process when a SCA is suspected.

=== Police departments in Canada which equip patrol vehicles with automated external defibrillators ===
Province	Police department	Number of AEDs	Date program started	Number of lives saved	Regional survival rate from SCA	Additional information
British Columbia	Victoria Police Department	In 2005, the Victoria Police Department distributed 5 AEDs among their patrol vehicles	2005	N/A	The survival rate from SCA in British Columbia is 12%.	This was the first police AED program in BC.
British Columbia	Vancouver Police Department	N/A	2013	N/A	The survival rate from SCA in British Columbia is 12%.	The Vancouver Police Department Regulations and Procedures Manual states the following: There shall be an AED deployed in the following vehicles: a. BET NCO vehicle b. CSIU NCO vehicle c. Patrol NCO vehicles d. Dog Squad NCO vehicle e. ERT NCO vehicle f. Marine Squad vessels (R.G. McBeath and the zodiac) g. Traffic NCO vehicle h. Police wagons; and i. Any other vehicle deemed appropriate. This policy came into effect 22 January 2013.
Alberta	Medicine Hat Police Department	N/A	N/A	N/A	NA	The Medicine Hat Police department has been progressively equipping their police cruisers with AEDs. The city of Medicine Hat Major Operating Expense Budget Request for 2012-2021 outlines the municipalities intention to increase their number of AEDs available to the Medicine Hat Police department, so that every police patrol vehicle is fully equipped with an AED.
Ontario	Ottawa Police Service	141	N/A	N/A	The SCA survival rate for Ontario is less than 6%. The SCA survival rate for Ottawa is double the provincial average at over 12%.	Every marked police car of the Ottawa Police Service is equipped with an AED. In addition to the AEDs in marked police vehicles, the Ottawa Police Service has 28 AEDs located in their facilities, including police stations, community policing centres and Ottawa Police headquarters.
Ontario	Brockville Police Service	12	September 2013	N/A	The SCA survival rate for Ontario is less than 6%.	N/A
Ontario	Cobourg Police Department	6	Spring 2012	By the fall of 2012, one of the AEDs was used by a police officer, to revive a man, prior to the arrival of an ambulance.	The SCA survival rate for Ontario is less than 6%.	N/A
Ontario	Perth Police Department	4	N/A	N/A	The SCA survival rate for Ontario is less than 6%.	The 4 AEDs were donated by the local Member of Parliament, Scott Reid. The Perth Police Department was amalgamated in April 2013, with the Ontario Provincial Police and it remains unclear what happened to the AEDs donated by Mr. Reid.
Ontario	Smiths Falls Police Department	8	N/A	N/A	The SCA survival rate for Ontario is less than 6%.	The 8 AEDs were donated by the local Member of Parliament, Scott Reid.
Ontario	South Simcoe Police Service	6	N/A	June 2015		The AEDs will be distributed among the police cruisers, the police command post and the marine unit.
Ontario	Thunder Bay Police Service	6	2015	N/A	N/A	The AEDs were purchased through a $16,000 donation from a local couple.
Quebec	Service de police de la Ville de Laval	70	2012	14 people were saved in the first two years of the police AED program.	N/A	In 2012, the Service de police de la Ville de Laval purchased 22 AEDs which were strategically deployed among police patrol cars. By 2014, these 22 AEDs resulted in 14 lives saved. The Laval Police Service purchased an additional 48 AEDs in 2014, bringing their total number to 70, allowing for an AED to be placed in every patrol vehicle and community police station.
Quebec	Service de police de la Ville de Saint-Jérôme	12	18 June 2012	N/A	N/A	
