= Christian Van Geloven =

Dutch murderer and pedophile

Christian Van Geloven (April 18, 1945 – August 6, 2011) was a Dutch kidnapper, rapist and double murderer, responsible for the murders of two young French girls on October 19, 1991, in Elne, Pyrénées-Orientales. For his crimes, he was sentenced to life imprisonment with 30 years of preventive detention on March 25, 1994, for the two killings, which he served until his cancer-related death in prison.

== The murders and the investigation ==
On October 19, 1991, around 4 p.m., the 10-year-old cousins Muriel Sanchez and Ingrid Van de Portaele were kidnapped from Elne while out to buy candy. According to Van Geloven, he took the young girls to a studio in Collioure where he raped, tortured and strangled them; however, this version corresponded more like a fantasy - the girls probably were raped and killed on the roadside. With directions from their killer, Sanchez and Van de Portaele's clothes were found in a nearby lake. As for the bodies, they had been thrown at the bottom of a 70-meter ravine at the Cirque de Navacelles.

== Arrest and custody ==
Ten days after the disappearance of the girls, the investigators were warned by the Perpignan Public Prosecutor's Office of a suspicious suicide attempt, three days after the crime, of a certain Christian Van Geloven, in a hotel room in Lourdes: the man was a convicted pedophile, whom supposedly had confessed to the girls' murders to a priest.

At this stage of the investigation, the police, who still bet on the possibility of an abduction or kidnapping, acted hurriedly to try and find Muriel and Ingrid alive. On November 1, 1991, Christian Van Geloven was arrested in Saint-Dizier in Haute-Marne, where he was hospitalized in a psychiatric hospital, and immediately placed in police custody. The only evidence available to investigators against the suspect at this time was that he owned a white car that fit the description given by the only witness in the case: a neighbor of the two little girls, who had seen the vehicle in the area at the time of the events. The investigators questioned Van Geloven according to the "funnel strategy": starting with general questions to put him at ease. After 12 hours of interrogation, he finally confessed: the girls were dead and it was him who killed them, by strangulation with a cord. Before committing the acts, Van Geloven had bought a leash to pretend that he had lost his dog, as well as a comic strip; there was a rifle and a knife in the trunk of his car, which indicated that it was a pre-planned crime. At the end, the murderer also indicated the place in which he disposed of the bodies.

=== Autopsies ===
The autopsies of the victims' bodies concluded that the children had been raped multiple times, "with aggravated torture or acts of barbarity being committed". The medical examiner's full report was heard on camera during the trial.

== Trial ==
The trial of Christian Van Geloven, now dubbed the "Monster of Elne", opened at the Perpignan cour d'assises on March 21, 1994. Protected behind a reinforced glass cage, the accused admitted to being a pedophile, to having killed both Muriel and Ingrid and subsequently disposed of their remains. However, he denied raping or torturing either girl. Even his lawyer, Mr. Furbery, turned against him, warning against the extreme dangerousness of his client and the high chance of recidivism in his case. Following the trial, Christian Van Geloven served his life sentence at Ensisheim prison, in Haut-Rhin. He died on August 6, 2011, at the Ensisheim Prison from cancer, and was buried in a potter's field in the village.

== Biography ==
Christian Van Geloven was born on April 18, 1945, in Eindhoven, in the Netherlands, where he spent the first four years of his life alternating between an alcoholic and violent father and neglectful mother who was a prostitute who sold his 3 year old sister to men for rape in his bedroom see Child Hunters Requiem of a child Killer by Carine Hutsebaut Criminal Profiler on the actual case. Coming from a large and modest family, Van Geloven was then taken in charge by an uncle and an aunt living in Paris, subjected to an abusive education. However, he was allegedly subjected to sexual abuse by his Latin Professor for two years who would anally rape him if he did not do well then if he did well was "allowed " to perform Fellatio on the Professor see Child Hunters: Requiem of a Child Killer by Carine Hutsebaut, Criminal Profiler. As an adult, he became a senior manager and head of the export department of a multinational company, was married and had two children. However, he was shortly dismissed before the murders of Muriel and Ingrid.

=== Previous crimes ===
The proceedings of the 1994 trial highlighted the troubled past of the accused. As of 1963, Van Geloven molested his adoptive sister, Isabelle, then aged four: abuse which lasted 7 years.

==== Previous convictions ====
- August 1984, in Orléans: sentenced to two years imprisonment for kidnapping and indecent assault. Experts considered Van Geloven a non-dangerous and rehabilitated individual. The defendant therefore benefitted from a leniency in his sentence and remained incarcerated for only 13 months.
- December 1992, in Bar-le-Duc, Meuse: sentenced to five imprisonment.

=== Psychological profile ===
At the time of his arrest, Christian Van Geloven was hospitalized in a Saint-Dizier psychiatry after several suicide attempts. He was generally described as intelligent and domineering, and considered that his pedophilia was a disease that could be cured.

The psychological experts later concluded that he suffered from a perverse sexual sadism disorder and pedophilia of an incurable nature.

== Reform of the penal code ==
As a result, from the Van Geloven and Tissier cases, a new judicial reform was implemented in France, with the creation of a "perpetual" security in the event of infanticides and child killings.

== See also ==
- Patrick Tissier

== Documentaries ==
- "Christian Van Geloven, sexual criminal" (March 7, 2004) in Enter the Accused, hosted by Christophe Hondelatte on France 2.
- "Christian Van Geloven, the Young Girls' Killer" in Stéphane Bourgoin Tells.
- "The police custody of Christian Van Geloven" in 48 Hours, hosted by Frédérique Lantieri on France 5.

== Radio broadcasts ==
- "Christian Van Geloven, the Monster of Elne" (May 17, 2012) in L'Heure du crime, hosted by Jacques Pradel on RTL.
- "Christian Van Geloven, the predator" (May 4, 2017 - April 8, 2018) in Hondelatte Tells, hosted by Christophe Hondelatte on Europe 1.
