= Ford Mustang SSP =

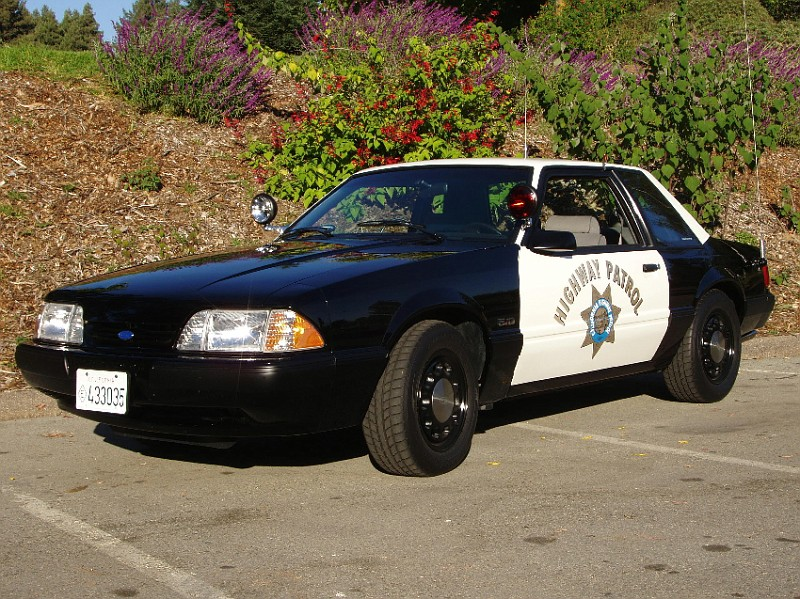

Overview
- Manufacturer: Ford
- Production: 1982–1993

Body and chassis
- Class: Pony/Muscle Police car
- Body style: 2-door coupe 2-door hatchback
- Layout: FR layout
- Platform: Fox (1979-1993)
- Related: Special Service Package; Police Package Vehicles; Special Service Vehicles

Powertrain
- Transmission: 4-speed automatic 5-speed manual

The Ford Mustang SSP is a lightweight police car package that was based on the Ford Mustang and produced by Ford between 1982 and 1993. The car was meant to provide a speedier option for police departments in lieu of other full sized (and heavier) sedans on the market at the time. SSP is an abbreviation for Special Service Package, a special Foxbody Mustang trim made exclusively for law enforcement use.

One of the taglines used by Ford for the vehicle was "This Ford chases Porsches for a living..."

The units served a number of uses, and were often customized to suit each law enforcement agency's particular needs. Law enforcement agencies from municipal to government agencies bought nearly 15,000 examples of these units. Many still exist today, either still in some role of law enforcement, from display cars to DARE cars, as well as in the hands of civilian collectors and racers.

== History ==
In 1982, the California Highway Patrol asked the Ford Motor Company to produce a capable and lightweight police car due to the bulkiness of current police cars like the Ford Fairmont and LTD/Crown Victoria and the problems incurred with Chevrolet Camaros with their camshafts and engine problems at pursuit speeds. Taking the Fox 5.0 Mustangs in production at the time, Ford produced the Ford Mustang SSP and modified them to suit the needs of the police and law enforcement departments.

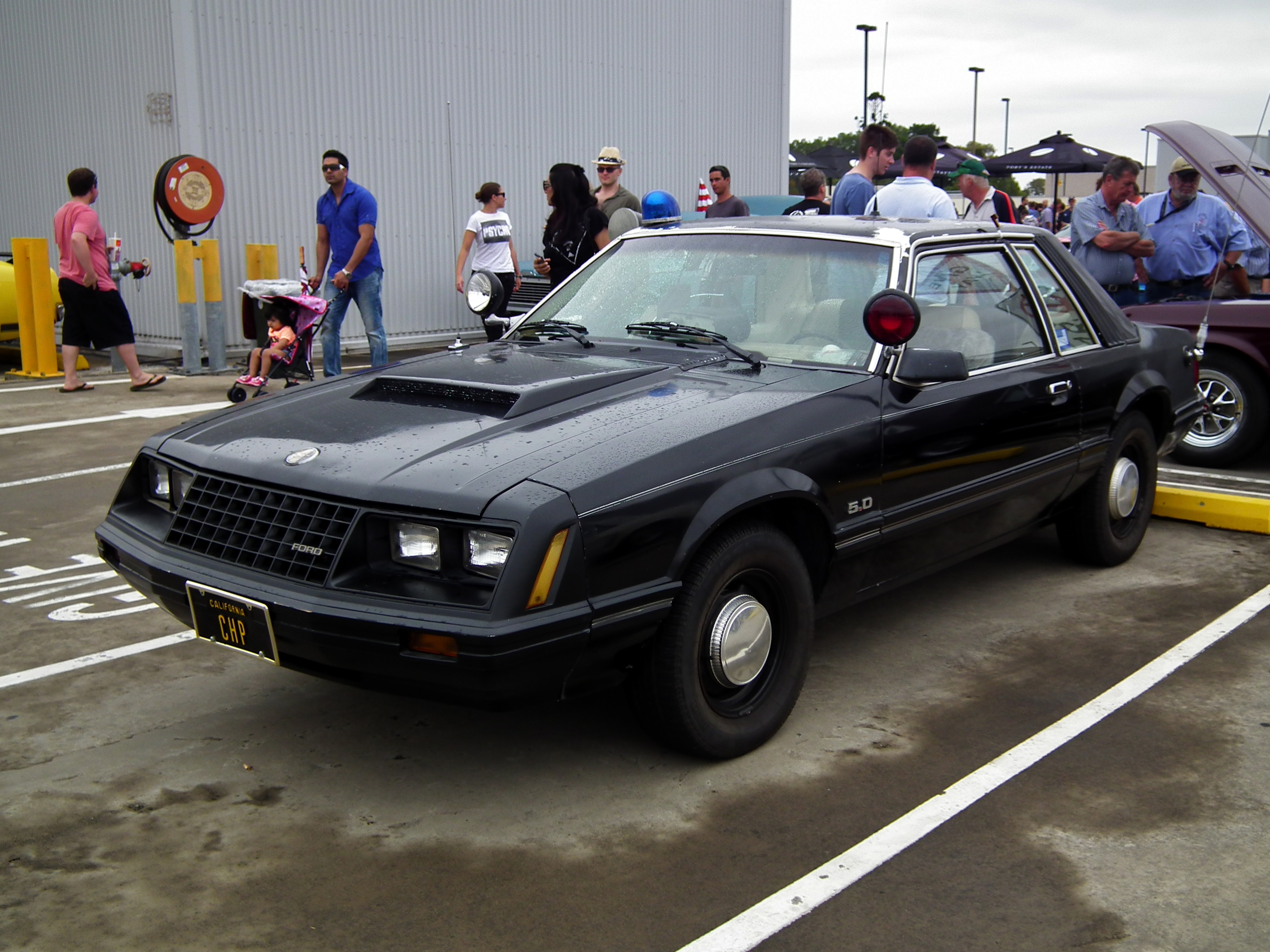
1982 Ford Mustang Coupe that was a former California Highway Patrol car

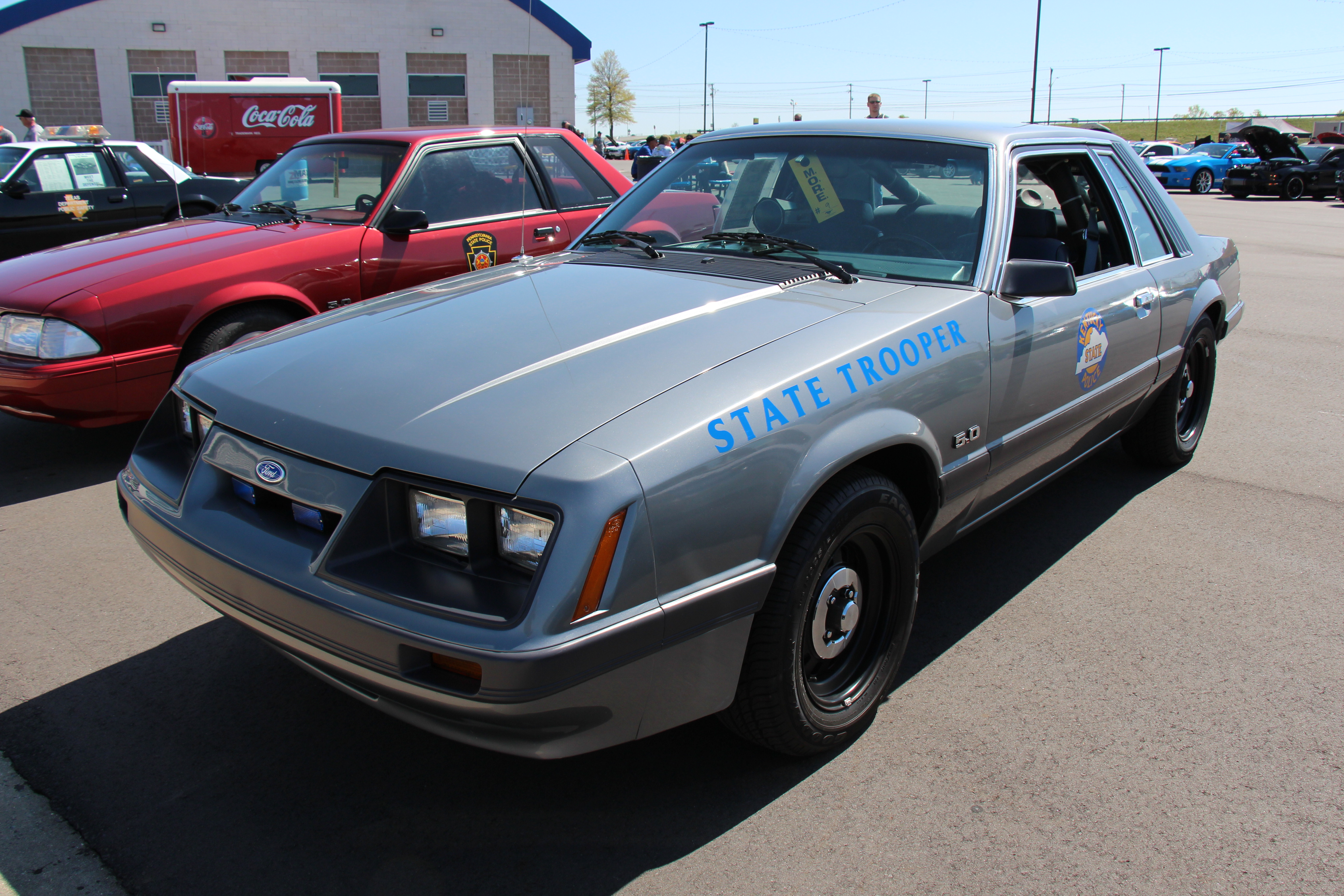
1985 Ford Mustang SSP 5.0 Coupe Kentucky State Police State Trooper car

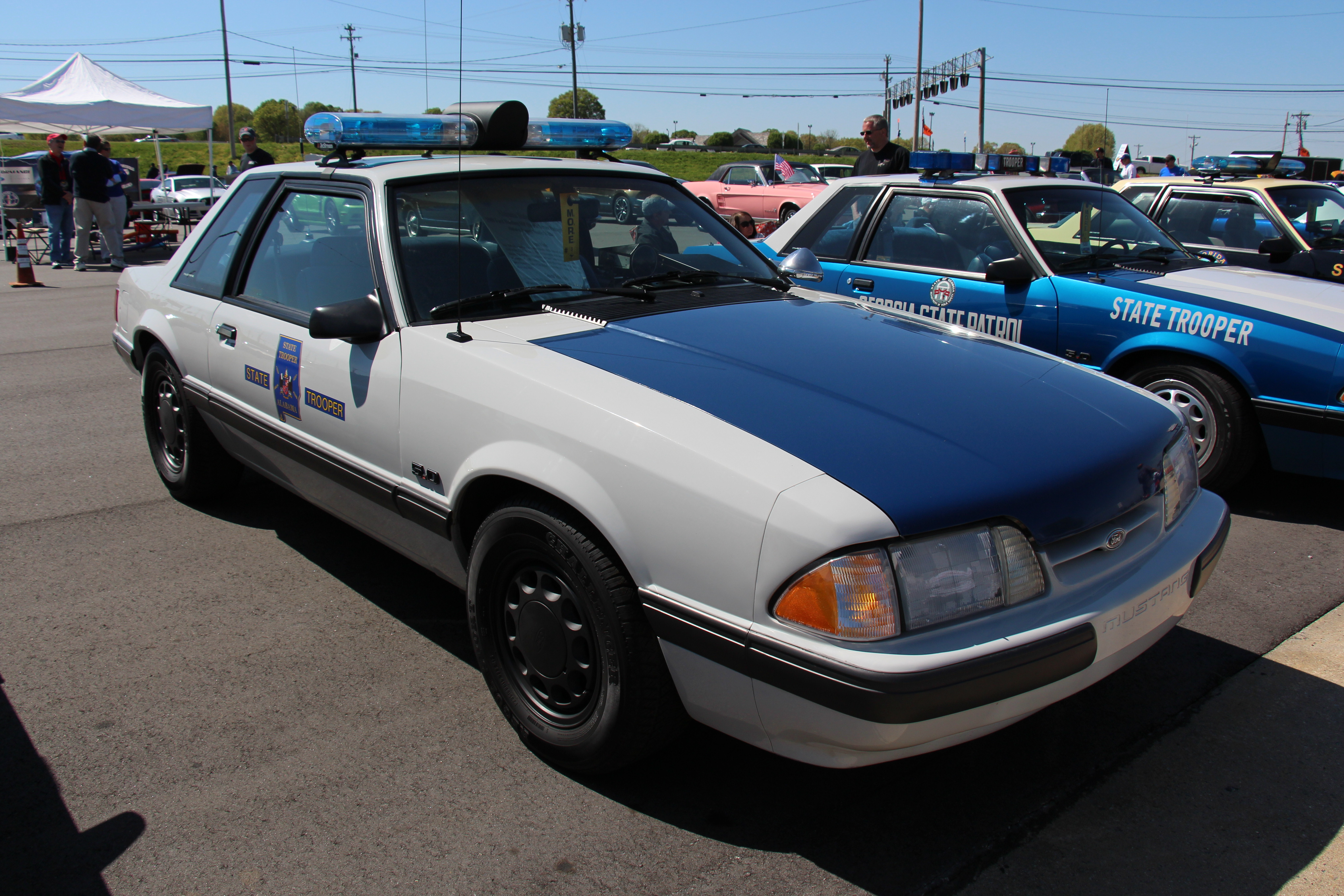
1989 Ford Mustang SSP Coupe Alabama State Police State Trooper car

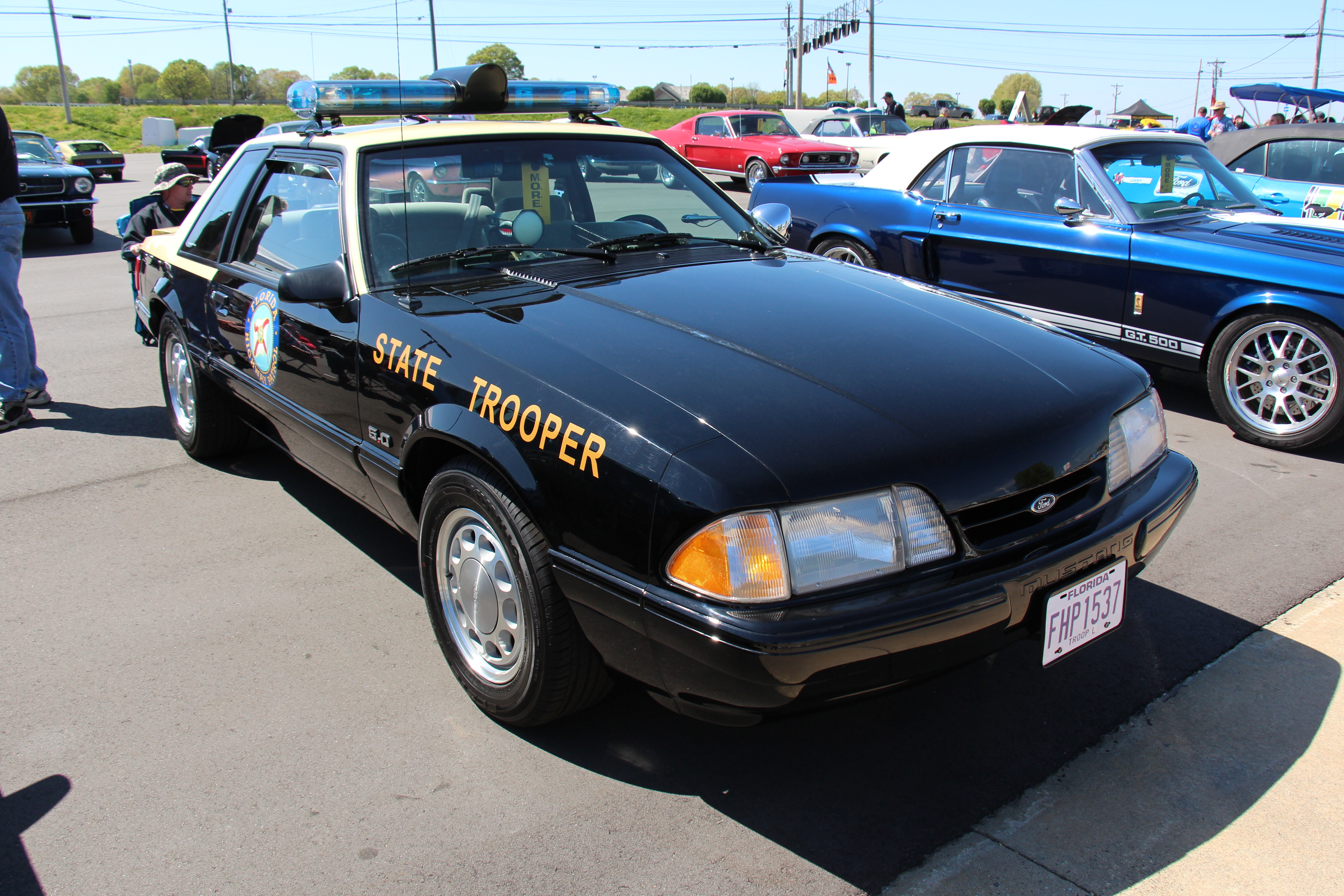
1992 Ford Mustang SSP Coupe owned by Florida Highway Patrol

It is estimated that nearly 15,000 of these special units were made from 1982 until their discontinuation in 1993 for over 60 law enforcement organizations and government agencies. Their roles ranged from general patrol to pursuit units, with some used in special duties like drug interdiction to academy training units. Several units were specially tasked to help land the Lockheed U-2 Spyplane.

== Specifications ==
The Mustang SSP was essentially a more rugged version of the 5.0 Mustang, with added features (some standard, some optional) not available to the general public. Some of the additional features were:

- Engine oil cooler
- Silicone radiator hoses and aircraft-style clamps
- Auto transmission fluid cooler
- 130 and 135 amp internally and externally regulated heavy duty alternators
- Two-piece VASCAR speedometer cable
- Certified calibrated speedometer 0-140 mph (1982-early 1989) and 0-160 mph (late 1989–1993)
- Non-operational courtesy lights (safety feature)
- Relocated rear deck release
- Single key locking doors/trunk
- Reinforced floor pans
- Full size spare tire

Depending on which agency bought them, extras like rollcages (installed by Oregon State Police and Kentucky State Police) and power windows (requested by New York State Police) made each SSP unique to their respective departments. The original configuration of the civilian Mustang with its small rear seat and manual transmission were generally considered ill-suited for a law-enforcement vehicle. Many SSPs had automatic transmissions, to free an officer's hand from using the manual transmission stick so that they could use the hand for other duties, such as speaking on a radio.

== Usage ==
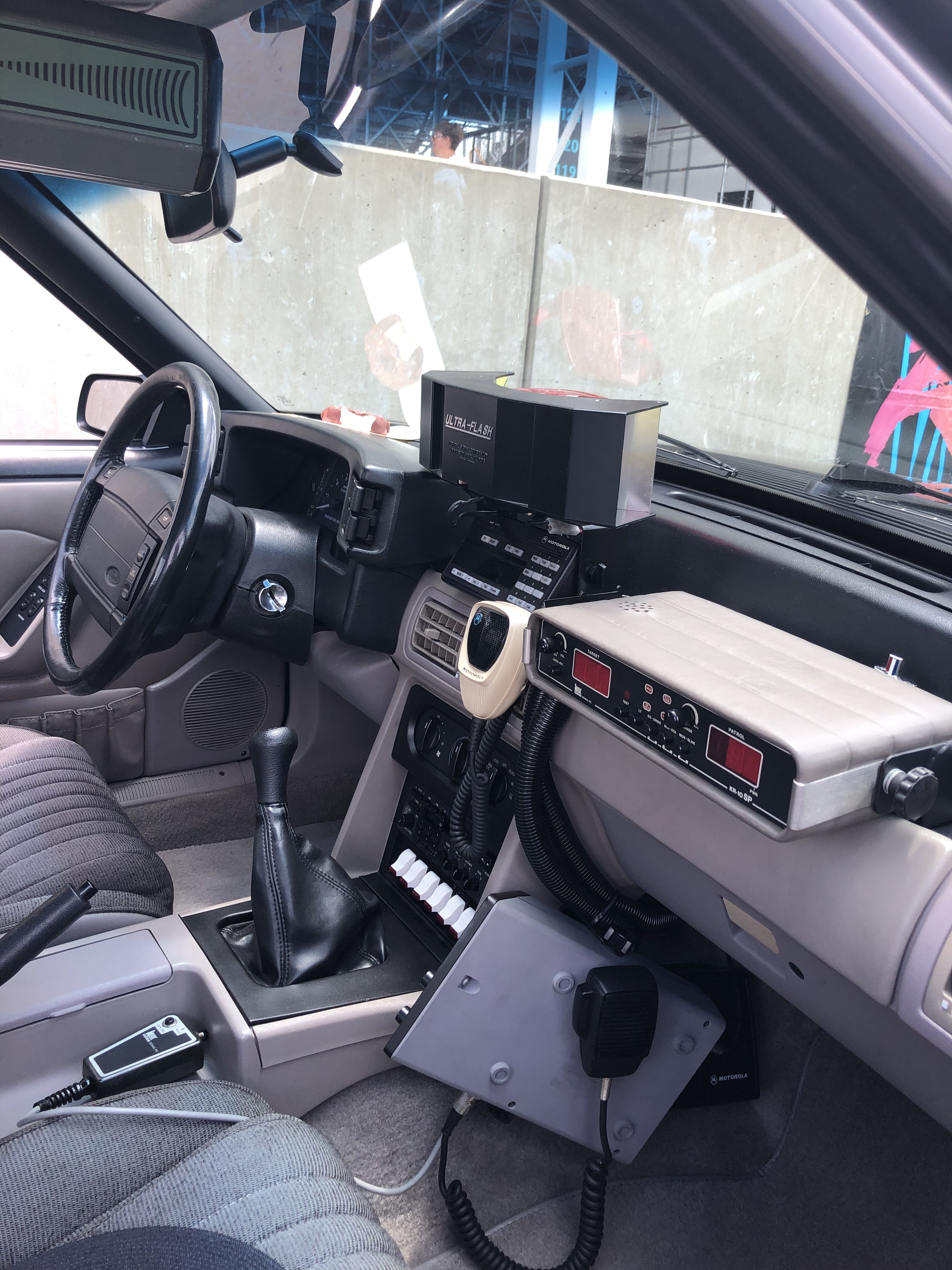
Interior of a 1992 Ford Mustang SSP Coupe formerly used by the Kansas Highway Patrol

Some of the known users of the Mustang SSP include:

=== United States government ===
- Drug Enforcement Administration
- Federal Bureau of Investigation
- Immigration and Naturalization Service
- United States Postal Service - 6 were used in the Los Angeles area in California
- United States Air Force - Used as a chase car for the U-2 Spy Plane
- United States Border Patrol - Part of a high-performance drug interdiction squad; resides at USBP Museum in Texas
- United States Customs Service
- US Fish and Wildlife Service

=== State governments ===
- Alabama State Troopers
- Arizona Department of Public Safety
- California Highway Patrol - Initial purchaser of the Mustang SSP
- Colorado State Patrol
- Connecticut State Police
- Delaware State Police
- Florida Highway Patrol - Second biggest user of the Mustang SSP
- Georgia State Patrol
- Idaho State Police
- Indiana State Police
- Kansas Highway Patrol
- Kentucky State Police
- Louisiana State Police
- Massachusetts State Police
- Michigan State Police
- Minnesota State Patrol
- Mississippi Highway Patrol
- Missouri Highway Patrol
- Nebraska State Patrol
- Nevada Highway Patrol
- New Mexico State Police
- New York State Police
- North Carolina Highway Patrol
- Oklahoma Highway Patrol
- Oregon State Police
- Pennsylvania State Police
- Rhode Island State Police
- South Carolina Highway Patrol
- Tennessee Highway Patrol
- Texas Department of Public Safety - Third biggest user of the Mustang SSP
- Utah Highway Patrol
- Virginia State Police - Manual transmission, unmarked cars
- Washington State Patrol
- Wisconsin State Patrol
- Wyoming Highway Patrol

=== City/County governments ===
- Arlington, TX Police Department
- Douglas County, GA Sheriff's Department
- Atlanta Police Department, GA
- Smithfield, VA Police Department
- Clearwater, FL Police Department
- Fort Worth Police Department, TX
- Jonesboro, AR Police Department
- New York City Police Department - confiscated drag racer refurbished for Highway Patrol
- Pensacola, FL Police Department
- San Francisco Police Department
- Winter Park FL Police Department
- Beverly Hills Police Department, CA
- Portland Police Bureau, OR
- Gilroy, CA Police Department
- Twin Cities Police Department; Larkspur, Corte Madera, CA
- Santa Clara County Sheriff's Department
- Earth, TX Police Department
- Tarrant County, TX Sheriff's Department
- Stephenville TX Police Department
- Parachute, CO Police Department
- Pinellas County Sheriff's Office, Largo Florida
- Homerville, GA Clinch County Sherriff's Office
- Dickinson County, KS Sheriff's Office
- Lancaster County, NE Sheriff's Office
- Layton, UT Police Department
- Harrisville, UT Police Department
- West Monroe, LA Police Department

=== Canada ===
- Royal Canadian Mounted Police

== Fate ==
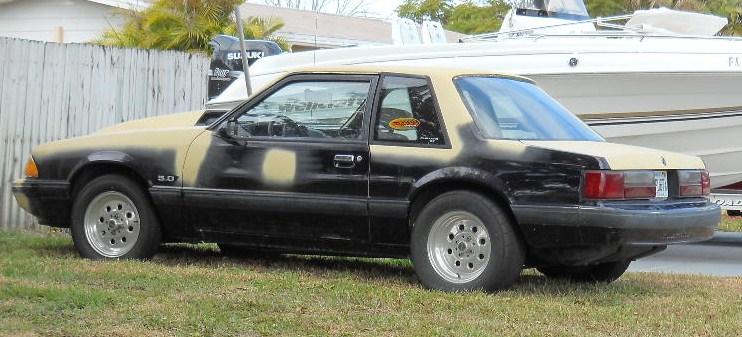
Ex Florida Highway Patrol Ford Mustang SSP

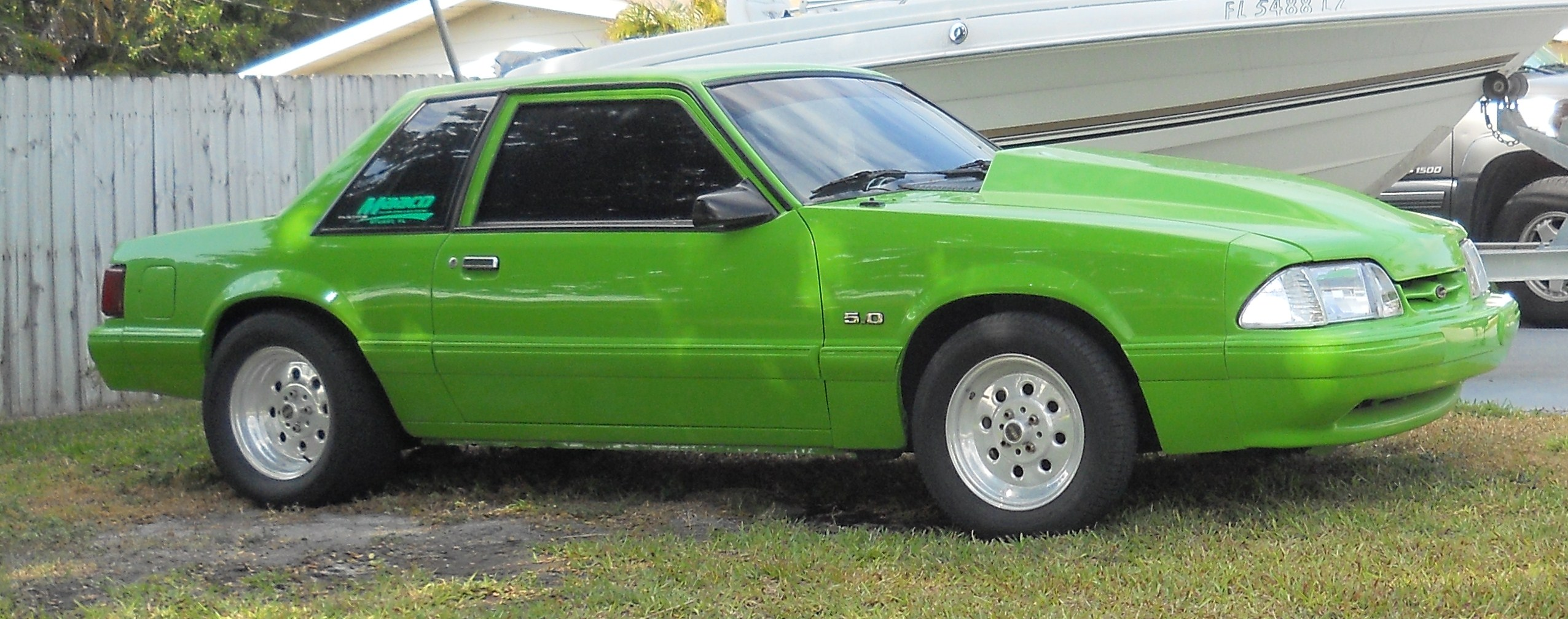
Same Florida Highway Patrol Ford Mustang SSP after repainting

Most of the Mustang SSPs have been retired from service, with a few examples still on the rosters of police departments as display or DARE cars. A few law enforcement agencies still keep them on active duty. Most examples have found their way into either racing or restoration.

With its stiffened frame and beefed up suspension, many Mustang SSPs were modified for use in drag racing. The plentiful aftermarket of parts for the 5.0 engine made the SSP platform a desirable frame to work on, but with the dwindling supply and rising prices of genuine Mustang SSPs, these factors have limited racers from converting SSPs for racing purposes.

Restoring Mustang SSPs have become a growing hobby as of late, with car clubs and websites devoted to the restoration of the law enforcement workhorse. Most enthusiasts strive for accuracy in their models, with many scouring for OEM parts, including police radios, shotgun holders, lights, sirens, and other related equipment. However, the hobby is limited, as many states have regulations on private citizens owning cars that could be mistaken for real law enforcement vehicles. Some get around the regulations by using magnetic decals and removable lights.

== Distinct models ==
=== CHP Hatchback ===
In 1982, the CHP ordered 400 Special Service Package notchback coupes (394 were built by Ford and shipped to the CHP), and at least 4 cars were SSP hatchbacks. These four hatchbacks were painted and equipped in the same manner as the SSP coupes. They were produced under a different 6-digit Fleet DSO number than the SSP coupes, and were retained for use and evaluation by the CHP. One of these hatchbacks exists in private hands.

=== CHP EVOC ===
Several Mustang SSPs were converted by the CHP to EVOC (Emergency Vehicle Operations Course) track vehicles. These EVOC vehicles were used for training the cadets how to drive at high speeds. The Mustangs were known for their 140+- mile per hour top speed. Modifications include a full roll cage, racing harnesses, and tuned front suspension (for high speed driving and cornering). The EVOC vehicles were highly maintained to ensure safety while on the track.

=== USAF U-2 chase car ===
Due to problems with landing the Lockheed U-2, a system was implemented where a second pilot would chase the U-2 (termed "mobile") and help guide the aircraft down to earth. The USAF usually utilized a performance car for this task.

In 1986, the USAF was looking for a replacement for the Chevrolet El Camino as a chase car for the U-2. Beale Air Force Base asked the local California Highway Patrol to provide a Mustang SSP for testing. The test proved the Mustang SSP superior to the El Camino and the USAF ordered 20 for work with the spyplanes.

Their career lasted until the late 1990s, when they were replaced by "Special Service" B4C Chevrolet Camaros.

One of three examples from RAF Alconbury is preserved: 1988 Mustang SSP 88B 9971 "Mobile 1", serving with the 17th Reconnaissance Wing and the 95th Reconnaissance Squadron until its disposal in 1999. It is currently in the hands of a private collector in the United States after being ferried from its last operation in Italy to England.

== Saleen connections ==
Noted manufacturer Saleen contributed to the history of the Mustang SSP. The Oregon State Police had ordered 34 coupes in 1988, but cancelled the order at the last minute. The dealership that ordered the coupes, Damerow Ford, scrambled to find a way to get rid of the order, and Saleen took custody of 14 of the cars. Saleen returned the cars after adding vehicle ID, rear spoiler, ground effects and interior upgrades. The dealer then resold them.

While not a SSP, Saleen modified another 5.0, a 1989 5.0 LX Hatchback, for the Seal Beach, California Police Department. Designated as an S442 model; this model served Seal Beach until its retirement in the late 1990s.

== See also ==
- Police vehicles in the United States

== Book and magazine references ==
- Mustang Forty Years, by Randy Leffingwell, ISBN 0-7603-1597-3
- Mustang Monthly "For Special Service" by Miles Cook, November 2004 (PDF copy of article here)
- Mustang Monthly "Highly Pursued" text and photos by Donald Farr, May 2006 pg 88–90
- Modified Mustangs "They Come, They Go!: First in Harms Way" sidebar Story by Don Roy Photos by James Pickett, January 2007 pg 117
