= Teisseire =

Teisseire may refer to:

- Teisseire (company), a French manufacturer of flavored syrups founded by Mathieu Teisseire in 1720
- People with the surname Tessiere
  - Aimé Teisseire (1914–2008), French military officer who fought with the Free French Forces in World War II
  - Camille Teisseire (1764–1842), French politician and businessman, grandson of Mathieu Teisseire
  - Claude Teisseire (1931–2025), French rugby league player
  - Jean-Pierre Teisseire (born 1940), French football player and former mayor of Cassis
  - Lucien Teisseire, (1919–2007), French professional bicycle racer

== See also ==
- Teissier
