= Pierre Tissier =

French government official (1903–1955)

Pierre Tissier (7 September 1903 – 19 January 1955) was a French resistance fighter and a high-ranking civil servant. He was president of the SNCF from May 1949 until his death.

== Life and career ==
Pierre Tissier was born in Bagneux, Hauts-de-Seine, to a family of high ranking civil servants. His father Théodore Tissier was Master of Requests to the Conseil d'État. Pierre became a member of the Conseil d’État in 1926. Afterwards he belonged to a number of ministerial cabinets during the 1930s of which Pierre Laval, future head of government in the Vichy France, was also a member. Tissier was also the administrative director of the Encyclopédie française.

In 1939 Tissier joined up and became a captain in the 1st Division of the Light Chasseurs Alpins. He headed up the 2nd Division of expeditionary French forces to Norway commanded by General Antoine Béthouart. After the evacuation in June 1940 he ended up in London and was the sole member of the Conseil d’État present in London. He thus became the first chief of staff of General Charles de Gaulle. As a consequence, the Vichy regime condemned Tissier to death in absentia for desertion.

Tissier played a significant role in the Free France government in exile. In 1941 he drafted the statutes of the Free French government and acted as contrôleur de l'armée with the rank of lieutenant colonel. The following year he authored a semi-official publication in French and English with the title The Government of Vichy (Le Gouvernement de Vichy). In the same year he also published on the Riom Trial. In 1944 he became the director of the cabinet of Adrien Tixier, Minister of the interior and worked to create new immigration laws. Tissier was the first director of the National Office of Immigration.

After the war Tissier continued to work in government and in 1947 became the Director of the Cabinet of Jules Moch. He was the Director General of Taxation from 18 May 1948 to 10 June 1949. Subsequently, he was named as president of the SNCF, replacing Marcel Flouret who had been forced to resign by the Transport Minister, Christian Pineau for having invested too much in electrification. He died at home in the 7th arrondissement of Paris on 19 January 1955.
