= Patrick Tissier =

French serial killer and rapist

- Born: 24 August 1952 (age 74); Bourges, France
- Conviction: Murder x3
- Penalty: 20 years (first murder); Life imprisonment plus 30 years preventative detention (latter crimes)

Details
- Victims: 3
- Span of crimes: 1971–1993
- Country: France
- States: Centre-Val de Loire, Midi-Pyrénées, Languedoc-Roussillon
- Date apprehended: 21 September 1993

Patrick Tissier (born 24 August 1952) is a French serial killer and rapist who was convicted of killing three people from 1971 to 1993 in the southern regions of France. His case, along with that of Christian Van Geloven, led to a reform in the penal code in regard to the treatment of child murderers.

== Biography ==
=== Early life ===
Patrick Tissier was born on 24 August 1952 in Bourges (Cher). He grew up in a difficult family environment, with five brothers and sisters, of whom he was the youngest, a violent father and a fickle mother. His childhood, which he describes as ‘disgusting’, left its mark on him.

In 1963, when Patrick was 11, his mother left the family home. With the first three children grown up, only Patrick, Lionel and Viviane stayed with their father, who began a relationship with Marie Luna.

In 1965, aged 12 and a half, Tissier tried to rape his sister Viviane. She reasoned with him and he gave up. Lionel, for his part, suffered several bouts of depression before committing suicide in 1986.

In March and April 1969, he tried to rape his mother-in-law in the bathroom. He hit her on the head and strangled her, but failed in his attempt. His mother-in-law lodged a complaint, involving the DDASS. He was then treated by a juvenile court judge and several psychiatrists, and stopped committing acts of violence.

After completing an apprenticeship as an electrician, Tissier was taken on as a petrol station attendant. In a bar, he met 16-year-old Marie-Françoise Pinson, an apprentice hairdresser, with whom he shared his life from 1969 to 1971.

=== First murder ===
On 1 May 1971, Tissier was about to leave for military service. He and Marie-Françoise go dancing at a ball and take a walk along the river near Bourges. Tissier tried to have one last sexual encounter with Marie-Françoise before leaving for the army, but she refused him. He loses his temper and frightens Marie-Françoise, who begins to panic. Tissier strangles her to death, strips her naked, rapes her and throws her body into the river. After committing his crime, Tissier took refuge in a hotel room in Bourges city centre under an assumed name.

On 2 May 1971, Marie-Françoise's body was discovered by walkers. Suspicion quickly focused on Tissier, who was the last person to see her alive and who could still not be found.

Tissier was arrested on 3 May 1971 in the hotel where he had taken refuge. He confessed to killing Marie-Françoise because she had refused him, from which he had deduced that she no longer loved him. Tissier was charged with murder and remanded in custody. He was 18 at the time.

When he entered the Bourges prison, Tissier surprised the staff by his good behaviour, which was described as exemplary. The psychiatric experts found no impairment of Tissier's judgement, arguing in particular that he was capable of lucid reasoning, having hidden under a false name to avoid detection. They therefore judged him to be entirely responsible for his actions.

On 25 April 1972, Tissier went on trial before the Cher Assize Court. The accused, aged 19, was described as an exemplary defendant, easily curable and re-adaptable. Tissier was sentenced to 20 years' imprisonment. Incarcerated at the Bourges prison, Tissier was transferred to the Muret detention centre, where he was described as an exemplary prisoner.

=== Escape, new crime and conviction for rape ===
In 1982, after 11 years in prison, Tissier was granted five temporary absences, during which all went well.

On 15 December 1982, Tissier went on his sixth furlough, for a period of three days. He was due to return to the Muret detention centre on 18 December 1982, but failed to do so. He then went on the run.

On 22 December 1982, in Toulouse, a secretary was eating in her car. Tissier threatened her with a shotgun, forced her to drive out of town and raped her. After the attack, Tissier continued on the run.

On 23 December 1982, he tried to rape a second young woman. The victim managed to escape, but Tissier stole her purse. Tissier then committed numerous thefts to ensure his escape. It is not known whether he committed any other murders during this escapade.

In April 1983, Tissier was finally spotted by passers-by during a robbery in Nice. He was arrested and charged with rape, escape, attempted rape and robbery with violence, and remanded in custody. The psychiatric experts appointed to examine him stressed that he was permanently dangerous and that it would be difficult to re-adapt him.

On 27 and 28 May 1985, Tissier appeared before the Haute-Garonne Assize Court for his escape, the rape of the secretary, the attempted rape of another young woman and the violent thefts committed during his escape. He was sentenced to 10 years' imprisonment.

=== Release and new murders ===
Tissier was released on 4 January 1992, after 8 1/2 years in prison. He was 39 years old at the time.

Following his release, Tissier moved to Perpignan to start a new life. He joined the Mormon community. He later met the Volckaert family, with whom he became close friends. The Volckaert children nicknamed him ‘Uncle Patrick’. At the time, the family was unaware of Tissier's criminal past. They saw him as a ‘kind’ and ‘helpful’ person.

On 6 August 1993, in Perpignan, Tissier killed his next-door neighbour Concetta Lemma, aged 45. He probably raped her and then strangled her to death. He tied her up and wrapped her in a shower curtain, before hiding her body in the ‘Coves’ underground tunnel in Canohès, several hundred metres below ground. Following Concetta Lemma's disappearance, her daughters asked Tissier if he had any news, but he replied in the negative. Tissier offered to go with them to the police station to report the disappearance. The gendarmes, believing it to be a voluntary departure, did not bother to open an investigation, however, as the missing woman was due to appear in court the following month as an accomplice to drug trafficking.

On the night of 10–11 September, Tissier attacked a friend, 41-years-old Marie-Josée Gauze, in the same town. He tried to strangle her with a scarf, but she resisted. He slammed her head hard against the floor several times, and she fainted. Tissier tied her up and undressed her. When she wakes up, he has almost certainly raped her. Tissier was about to kill her, but Marie-Josée Gauze reasoned with him, calmed him down and left. The victim called A&E and was admitted to hospital. Convinced that he was wanted for the attempted murder of his girlfriend, Tissier went on the run.

On 13 September, at 6pm, in the car park of the primary school, Tissier was waiting for 8-year-old Karine Volckaert, the daughter of Jocelyne Milluy, a Mormon friend. Karine readily accepted his offer to take her home. He parked near a warehouse out of sight and told her they were going to play a game. He handcuffs, gags and bonnets her. He forced her to get out of the car and hide. He drove to Fitou and parked the car near an abandoned house outside the village. He puts Karine in the back of the car and rapes her, forcibly holding her wrists. She tries to fight back, but Tissier hits her several times. Realising what he had done, Tissier strangled her to death. He rapes her again, carries her away, throws her into the well of the abandoned house and throws rubbish over her to hide her.

=== Arrest, imprisonment and consequences for recidivism ===
On 21 September 1993, Tissier was arrested by the gendarmes in Paulhan (Hérault) after a chase. He surrendered without resistance. His car contained weapons. He told the investigators where to find the body of Karine Volckaert. During questioning, he confessed to the attack on Marie-Josée Gauze and to the rape and murder of Karine. Tissier was remanded in custody and charged with murder followed by rape of a minor under the age of 15 against Karine Volkaert and the attempted murder of Marie-Josée Gauze.

Tissier's arrest sparked a media debate on recidivism and led to controversy over the reinstatement of the death penalty for child murderers.

On 1 February 1994, Pierre Méhaignerie, the then Minister of Justice, proposed a law known as the ‘incompressible life sentence’, which would allow the court to exclude the early release of a person convicted of rape and murder of a minor, thus preventing other criminals like Patrick Tissier from being released from prison at the end of a security period, if the court so decided.

While in prison, Tissier sent numerous letters to the investigating judge, Danielle Braud, in which he described his mixture of violence and sexuality. After two years in prison, Tissier stated that he had statements to make concerning the disappearance of Concetta Lemma.

On 19 September 1995, Tissier was taken from his cell to make his revelations. Questioned by Judge Braud, he initially stated that he could not stand being insulted by his guards and fellow inmates, and then said that it was unfair not to have chocolate for breakfast. After discussing his misunderstandings in prison at length, Tissier confessed to having killed Concetta Lemma by strangling her, before dismembering her, and then confessed to having scattered the remains of her body in a pond in Fitou. He is now under investigation for the murder of Concetta Lemma. After Tissier returned to his cell, a search was carried out for several months, but came to nothing. Following unsuccessful searches by the investigators, Tissier finally confessed to having lied about where he had hidden Concetta Lemma's body and gave another version, in which he claimed to have hidden the body under 2,000 cubic metres of rubble. Tissier's confession also turned out to be a ‘pure fabrication’.

Tissier was again taken from his cell on 13 September 1996 to be re-interviewed about the murder of Concetta Lemma. In police custody, Tissier gave the investigators new and detailed clues, finally confessing that Concetta's body had been found in the ‘Coves’ underground tunnel in Canohès. Excavations were carried out at the site and Concetta's body was discovered three years after her disappearance, on 16 September 1996.

Tissier was tried before the Pyrénées-Orientales Assize Court for the murder of Concetta Lemma, the attempted murder of Marie-Josée Gauze and the murder of Karine Volkaert and rape of a minor under the age of 15, committed as a repeat offender. He is nicknamed ‘The Ogre of Perpignan’.

=== Trial and imprisonment ===
On 26 January 1998, Tissier's trial opened at the Pyrénées-Orientales Assize Court in Perpignan. He was 45 years old at the time.

Étienne Nicolau acted for Jocelyne Milluy and Marie-Josée Gauze. André Coll acted for the Lemma family. Patrick Tissier is being defended by Enric Vilanova and Pierre Parrat.

The psychiatric experts concluded that Tissier did not suffer from any mental pathology and that he associated violence and sexuality: for him, the two terms were inseparable. He subjected his victims to multiple tortures in order to satisfy his sexual needs. Tissier was questioned about the murders in Perpignan, and among other things stated that he had ‘wanted’ Karine Volckaert and that he had felt urges the weekend before the girl's death. He said that between the attack on Marie-Josée Gauze and the abduction of Karine Volckaert, which lasted an entire weekend, he feared that the police would find him and that he had hidden in Perpignan. At the end of the trial, Tissier apologised for all the atrocities he had committed and said he did not want the city of Perpignan to see ‘another Patrick Tissier’.

On 30 January 1998, Tissier was sentenced to life imprisonment, with a security period of 30 years.

=== Possibility of release ===
In September 2023, many media outlets reacted to the 30th anniversary of Tissier's imprisonment, giving him the opportunity to apply for parole. The victims' families and surviving victims were strongly opposed to his ever being released, convinced that he would commit new crimes.

As a result of this media coverage, Yvelise R. came forward and claimed to be another of Tissier's victims, whom he allegedly raped during his sixth temporary absence in December 1982. Yvelise, who was in her early twenties at the time, admitted that Tissier had entered her home while her husband, Christian, was being held at the Muret detention centre, where Tissier had been detained for the murder of his girlfriend. As he did not know Yvelise personally, Tissier learned of the couple's home through Christian. He allegedly took advantage of Christian's imprisonment to enter Yvelise's home and rape her in her absence.

I'm reacting today because I tell myself that if I'd alerted the police at the time, maybe this guy would have been arrested and he wouldn't have committed the horrors he did. I'm talking because Patrick Tissier is eligible for release and I'd hate myself for the rest of my life if he succeeded in stealing the address of a sister, wife or granddaughter of a fellow inmate and went back to raping and killing.

— Yvelise R.

== After his case ==
Since his conviction, Gauze has retold the story of her attack on the TV show 'Rescapées de tueurs en série' (French: Survivors of serial killers), explaining what had happened on that fateful night.

== List of victims ==
Facts		Discovery		Identity	Age
Date	Place	Date	Place	Identity	Age
1 May 1971	Bourges	2 May 1971	Bourges	Marie-Françoise Pinson	18
Mid-December 1982	Toulouse	3 October 2023	Toulouse	Yvelise R.	≃20
22 December 1982	Toulouse	22 December 1982	Toulouse	a secretary	18
23 December 1982	Toulouse	23 December 1982	Toulouse	a young woman	?
6 August 1993	Perpignan	16 September 1996	Canohès	Concetta Lemma	45
10 September 1993	Perpignan	10 September 1993	Perpignan	Marie-Josée Gauze	41
13 September 1993	Perpignan	22 September 1993	Fitou	Karine Volckaert	8

== See also ==
- List of French serial killers
- List of serial rapists

== Bibliography ==
- Georges Fenech (14 October 2009). Criminels récidivistes : peut-on les laisser sortir? [Repeat offenders: can we let them out?] (in French). Archipel. ISBN 978-2809802955.

== Documentaries ==
- "The Patrick Tissier case" in 2002 in Autopsy of a murder on 13th street.
- "Patrick Tissier, the recidivist" in May 2008 and December 2009 in "Get the Accused" presented by Christophe Hondelatte on France 2.
- "Karine, 8 years old" first report of the "Special: they have recidivated" in Crimes broadcast on April 6, 13 and 21, 2015 on NRJ 12.
- "In the eyes of Olivier: they were close to death", reports and interviews of several people including Marie-Josée Gauze. Posted on September 16, 2015, on France 2.
