= Basil Parasiris =

Canadian acquitted of murder (born 1965)

Basil Parasiris (born October 28, 1965) is a former Montreal-area businessman who was acquitted of a first-degree murder charge in the shooting death on March 2, 2007 of Sergeant Daniel Tessier, a Laval police officer.

== Execution of search warrant ==
On March 2, 2007, Laval police executed a search warrant at Basil Parasiris's home on a quiet Brossard street on Montreal's south shore. The warrant, authorized by justice Gaby Dumas, allowed Laval police to use dynamic entry, which is to surprise the person who is investigated, to carry out their search for evidence. In general, dynamic entry is not allowed to be used unless there is a risk of a suspect destroying evidence if he is alerted that police are on the premises.

The warrant was executed before dawn, when a team of armed and plain clothed Laval police officers knocked down the door to Parasiris's home and rushed into his bedroom, where he and his wife were sleeping. Unaware that they were police officers executing a search warrant, Parasiris assumed it to be a home invasion. He rushed to his revolver and shot at the presumed invaders.

The first shot fired hit Constable Daniel Tessier in the head, and the second pierced his heart. Tessier's partner, Stéphane Forbes, was also wounded by one of the four bullets fired from Parasiris's revolver in the 30-second shootout with the police, as was Mr. Parasiris's wife, Penny, as she fled to a closet. Mr. Parasiris's two children, 15 and 7, were terrified at hearing gunfire in their home; the older son rushed to call 9-1-1 and was directed to stay put.

== Bail hearing ==
Charged with first-degree murder, Parasiris stood for bail in front of Quebec Superior Court Justice Jean-Guy Boilard and represented by marquee Montreal lawyer, Frank Pappas. During his bail hearing, the judge focused on whether Parasiris was a community or flight risk. Witnesses who testified for Parasiris claimed that he was honest and peaceful man. The judge suggested that the warrant the police executed on Parasiris 's home did not constitute justifiable dynamic entry nor a predawn raid, and should have knocked prior to entering.

During the bail hearings, Parasiris claimed that he intentionally fired his revolver at Sergeant Daniel Tesser under the impression that it was a robbery and that he did not recognize Tessier as a police officer until after he had fallen, as the word "Police" was on the back of the vest. After testimony from witnesses and from Parasiris, Justice Boilard came to the decision of allowing Basil to be given bail. No suspect in Canada had been released on bail for the charge of first-degree murder of a police officer, according to Pappas. His conditions included abiding by a curfew, living with his parents, and having a sister and cousin post a $100,000 bond.

According to media versions at the time of the shooting, the bullet that wounded Penny had been fired from a police weapon. Also, several rounds had been fired by the police into the children's bedroom.

== Verdict and acquittals ==
Parasiris faced a variety of charges; including the attempted murder charge on Tessier's partner, Stéphane Forbes, two weapons charges, and first-degree murder. On June 10, 2008, Quebec Judge Guy Cournoyer found that there was insufficient evidence to convict Parasiris of attempted murder or the weapons charges. He then ordered the jury to sequester and consider coming to a verdict only on the murder charge.

On June 13, the jury reached a not guilty verdict on the charge of first-degree murder of a police officer. The jury suggested that there was reasonable ground to believe that he had acted in self-defence and that he had believed that the police officers were about to harm his wife and his children. Also, the Judge deemed that the search warrant that was used to enter Parasiris's suburban home was illegal.

== Aftermath ==
Laval Police Chief Jean-Pierre Gariépy expressed dismay at the verdict and cited the reasons for the officers being at Parasiris's home in the first place. Gariépy assured that he would suggest to the Quebec's Public Security Department to review the policies and the procedures behind the use of dynamic entry on search warrants to avoid such complications in the near future. Thousands of police officers from Quebec and elsewhere in Canada marched on the day of Tessier's funeral to protest his death.

Parasiris claimed that the police were trying to cover their mistakes in his case and attempting to frame him as a drug kingpin. He also considered filing a lawsuit against the Laval police for defamation of character.

On July 27, 2010, the Laval police announced that they were countersuing Parasiris as they believed that there was enough evidence to pursue him for damages.
