= Évaux-et-Ménil =

- Commune
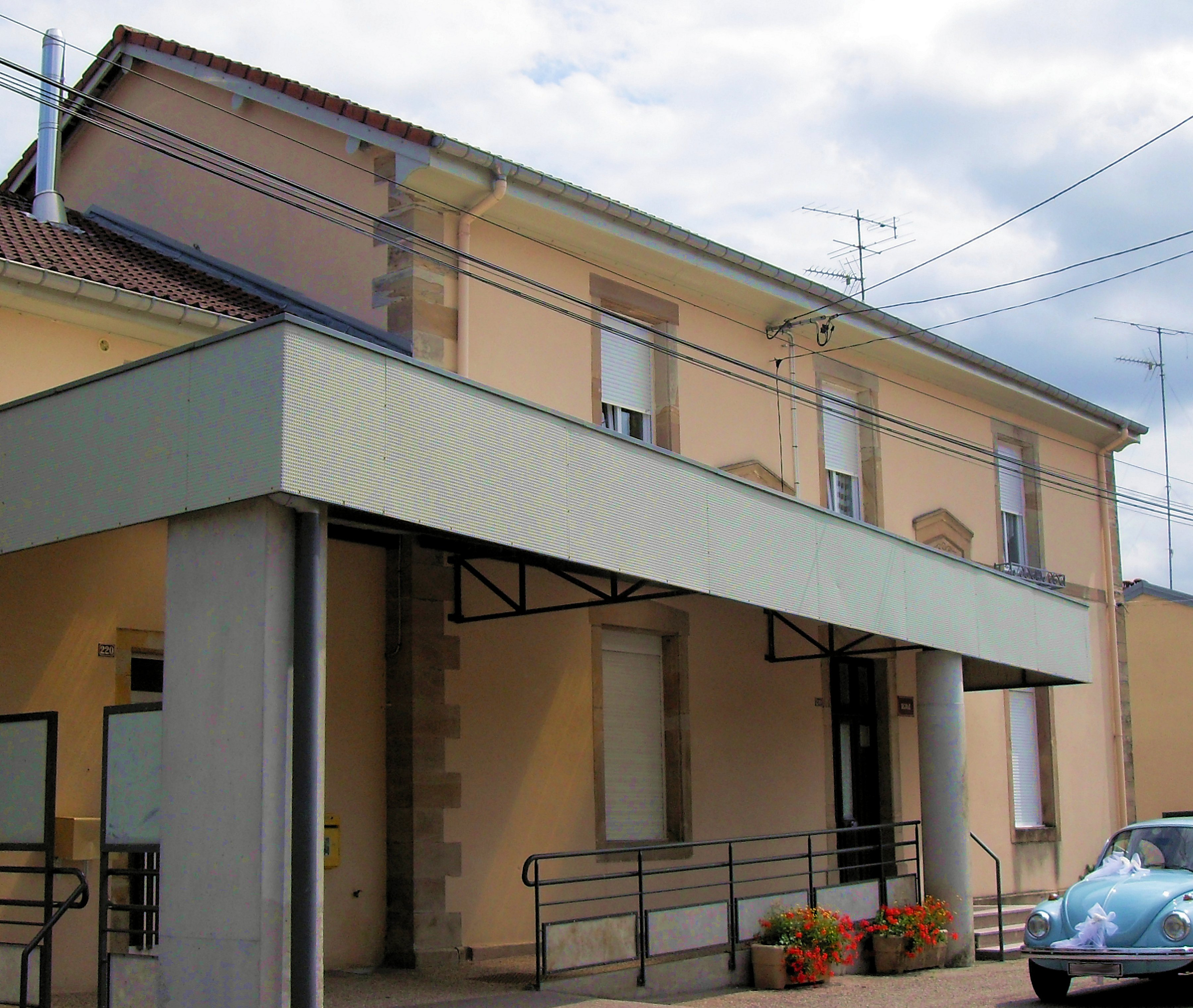
- The town hall and school in Évaux-et-Ménil

- Coat of arms
- Location of Évaux-et-Ménil
- Location within France Location within Grand Est
- Coordinates: 48°19′31″N 6°17′58″E
- Country: France
- Region: Grand Est
- Department: Vosges
- Arrondissement: Neufchâteau
- Canton: Charmes
- Intercommunality: CC Mirecourt Dompaire

Government
  - Mayor (2020–2026): Danielle Izzillo
- Area^{1}: 5 km^{2} (1.9 sq mi)
- Elevation: 320 m (1,050 ft)
- Highest elevation: 437 m (1,434 ft)
- Lowest elevation: 293 m (961 ft)
- Population (2023): 350
  - Density: 70/km^{2} (180/sq mi)
- Time zone: UTC+01:00 (CET)
  - Summer (DST): UTC+02:00 (CEST)
- INSEE/Postal code: 88166 /88450
- ^{1} French Land Register data, which excludes lakes, ponds, glaciers > 1 km^{2} (0.386 sq mi or 247 acres) and river estuaries.

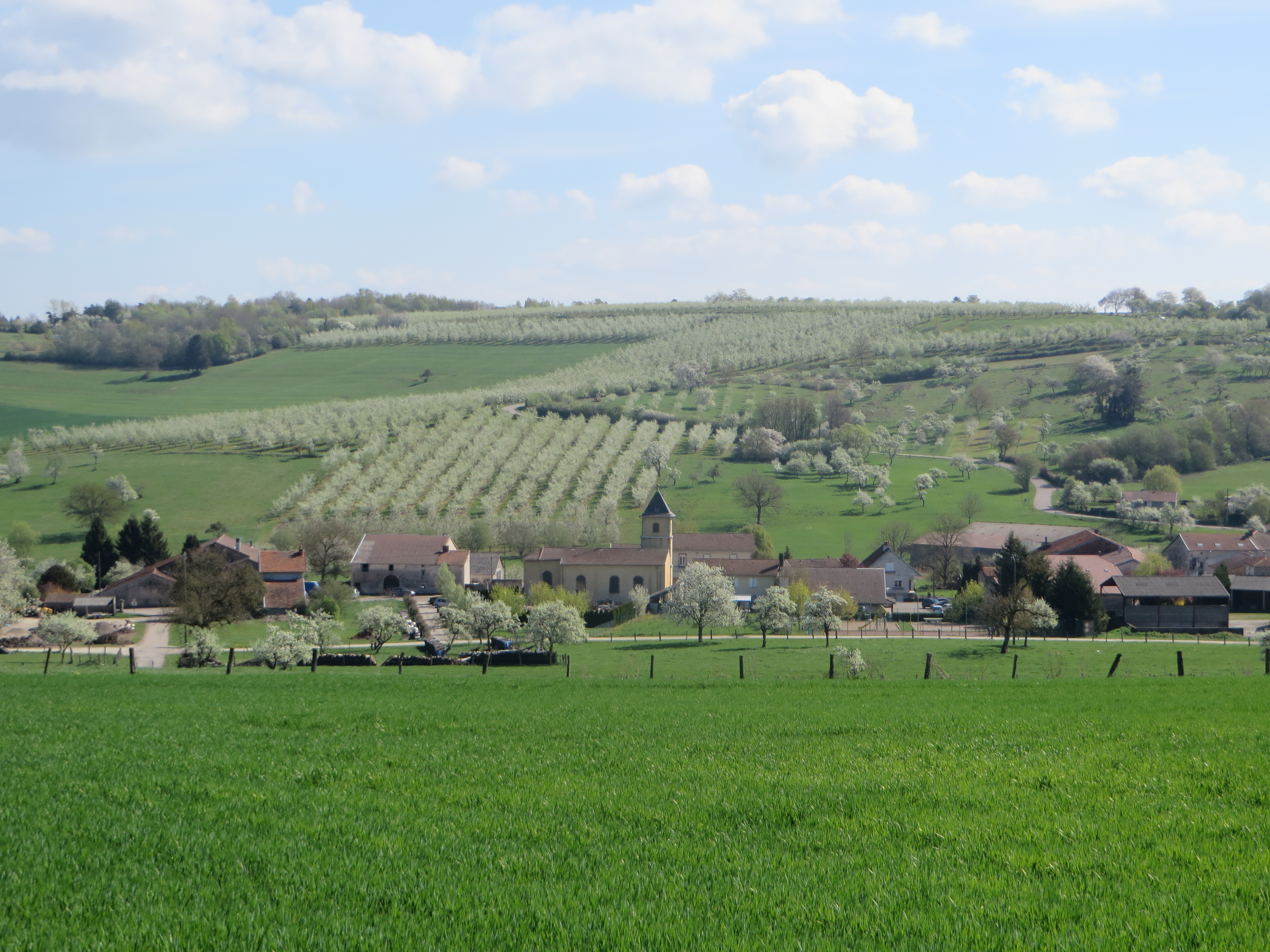
General View of the village Évaux-et-Ménil

Évaux-et-Ménil (French pronunciation: [evo e menil]) is a commune in the Vosges department in Grand Est in northeastern France.

== See also ==
- Communes of the Vosges department
