= January 1909 =

Month in 1909

<<	January 1909					>>
Su	Mo	Tu	We	Th	Fr	Sa
					1	2
3	4	5	6	7	8	9
10	11	12	13	14	15	16
17	18	19	20	21	22	23
24	25	26	27	28	29	30
31

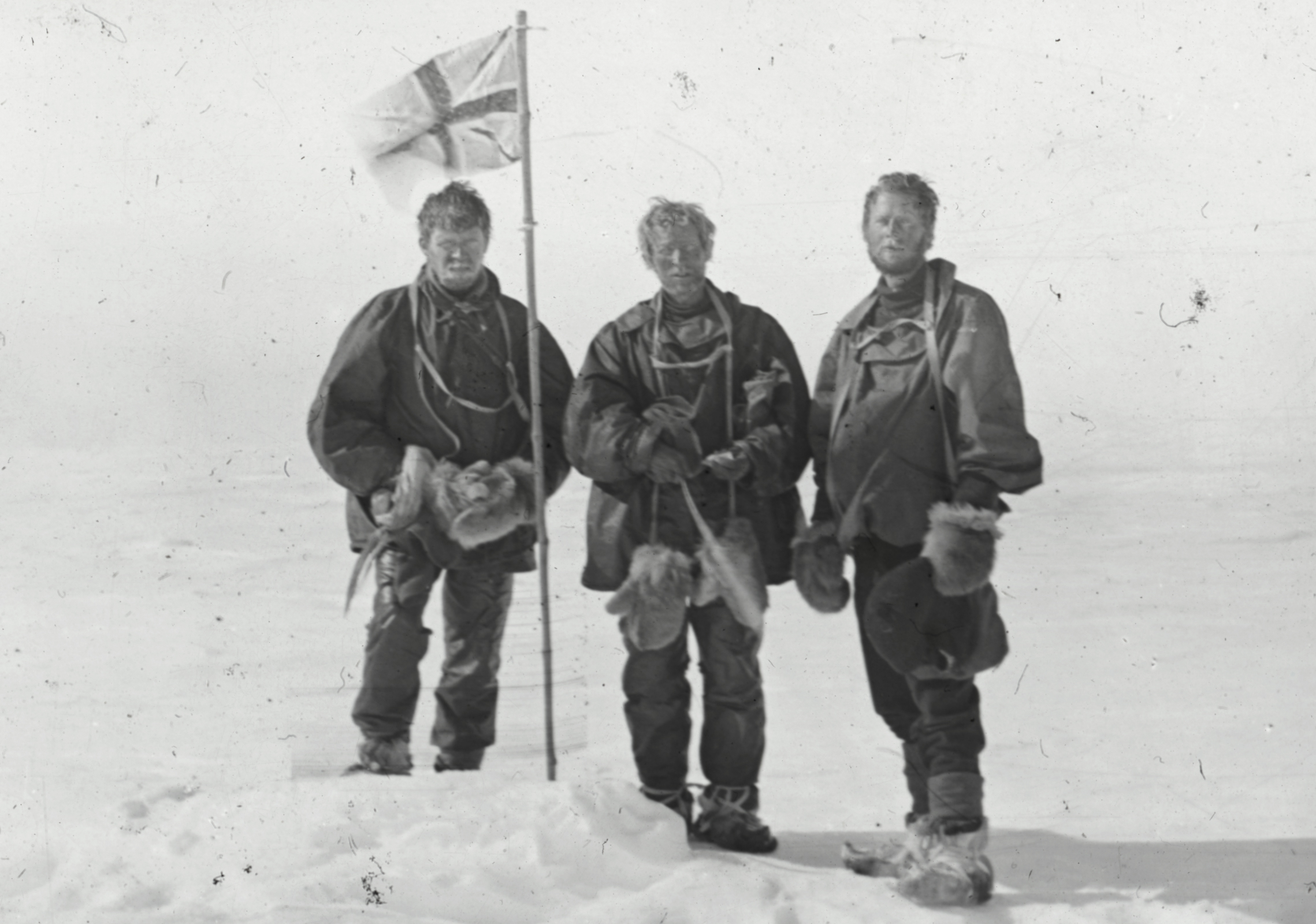
January 16, 1909: Mackay, David and Mawson become the first humans to reach the South Magnetic Pole

The following events occurred in January 1909:

== January 1, 1909 (Friday) ==
- The Old Age Pensions Act 1908 went into effect in Great Britain, and the first payments were made to qualified persons at least 70 years old and whose income was less than 12 shillings per week. Roughly 490,000 persons received the pension during the first year.
- The Disenfranchisement Act of 1908 took effect in Georgia, the last legislation designed to block African Americans from voting. The new law required a "literacy test", whereby a person had to explain the meaning of a section of the state constitution, if he owned less than 40 acres (160,000 m^{2}) of property. Descendants of U.S. or Confederate military veterans were exempt from the test.
- The City of Honolulu and the County of Oahu were formally incorporated.
- Born: Stepan Bandera, Ukrainian ultranationalist leader; in Staryi Uhryniv, Austria-Hungary (assassinated 1959)

== January 2, 1909 (Saturday) ==
- Yuan Shikai was dismissed from his job as Viceroy of Zhili by Prince Chun, the regent for the young Emperor of China. Facing execution, Yuan fled from Beijing. Two years later, he became China's first President.
- Aimee Kennedy Semple was ordained as a Pentecostal missionary in Chicago, the start of a career of evangelism. She would later become famous as Aimee Semple McPherson.
- Born: Barry Goldwater, U.S. Senator and 1964 presidential candidate; in Phoenix, Arizona (d. 1998)
- Died: Marta Abreu, 64, Cuban philanthropist (b. 1845)

== January 3, 1909 (Sunday) ==
- The Deutsche Gesellschaft für Soziologie (DGS, German Society for Sociology) was founded in Berlin by Max Weber, Rudolf Goldscheid, Ferdinand Tönnies, Georg Simmel, and others.
- In Italy, the volcano on Stromboli Island erupted. The volcano gave its name to the strombolian eruption, in which small amounts of lava are fired high into the air.
- Born: Victor Borge, Danish entertainer; as Børge Rosenbaum in Copenhagen (d. 2000)

== January 4, 1909 (Monday) ==
- Explorer Aeneas Mackintosh of the Imperial Trans-Antarctic Expedition escaped death by fleeing across ice floes.
- The Odes of Solomon, a collection of forty-two hymns that had been considered lost, was rediscovered by Professor J. Rendel Harris, who found them in a 15th-century Syriac manuscript that had been in his possession. The odes have been described as "Jewish Christian hymns celebrating the union of Christ and the believer", and are believed to have been composed in the 3rd century AD.
- The Real Federación Española de Fútbol, governing body for Spanish soccer football, was founded in Madrid.
- Born: J. R. Simplot, American billionaire who made his fortune from potatoes; in Dubuque, Iowa (d. 2008)

== January 5, 1909 (Tuesday) ==
- Mulai Abd-el-Hafid was acknowledged to be the rightful Sultan of Morocco by France and other European powers. He would reign until 1912, when Morocco was made a French protectorate by the Treaty of Fez.
- Orville Wright told reporters, "I do not believe the aeroplane will ever take the place of trains or steamships for the carrying of passengers... I believe ultimately the aeroplane may be put to special uses in the carrying of passengers, but never in excess of 10 or 20 persons."
- Crawford County, Pennsylvania, ordered a 100-day quarantine of the towns of Springboro, Conneautville, Meadville, Brookville and Linesville because of an outbreak of rabies in western Pennsylvania.
- Methodist minister John H. Carmichael, of Adair, Michigan, disappeared shortly after departing for Columbus. The next day, body parts were found burning inside two stoves inside his church. Though at first it was believed to be the dismembered body of Reverend Carmichael, subsequent investigation determined that the body was of Gideon Browning, and Carmichael was suspected of being a fugitive from murder. The case, which had made front pages across America, ended when Carmichael committed suicide in Carthage, Illinois, on January 11.
- Born: Stephen Cole Kleene, American mathematician; in Hartford, Connecticut (d. 1994)

== January 6, 1909 (Wednesday) ==
- The Great White Fleet, consisting of 16 U.S. Navy battleships sailing the globe in a display of American naval power, successfully completed its passage through the Suez Canal, passing from the Indian Ocean into the Mediterranean Sea. It was the largest group of ships to pass through up to that time, and the Canal had been closed to all other traffic. The ships would return to the United States on February 22.
- Germany assumed control of diamond mining in German Southwest Africa (modern day Namibia). Diamonds had been discovered there on June 23, 1908.
- "Albertus", a magician who billed himself as superior to Houdini and Brindamoor, nearly drowned after attempting to escape a tightly laced straitjacket after plunging into the waters off of Atlantic City, New Jersey. A crew from the government life-saving station came to his rescue.

== January 7, 1909 (Thursday) ==
- The first pilot's licenses were issued in France, by the Aero-Club de France. The first eight "pilote-aviateur" licenses were presented in Paris to aviation pioneers Orville Wright, Wilbur Wright, Albert Santos-Dumont, Louis Blériot, Robert Esnault-Pelterie, Léon Delagrange, Henri Farman and Captain Ferdinand Ferber.
- Working at the Kodaikanal Solar Observatory, British astronomer John Evershed made the important discovery that gas radiates over the surface of sunspots, from the inner border to the outer edge, and described it in a paper later that year. The phenomenon is now referred to as the Evershed effect.

== January 8, 1909 (Friday) ==
- The U.S. House of Representatives accepted, 212–35, a committee report condemning outgoing President Theodore Roosevelt, in effect voting to censure him. The same day, the U.S. Senate voted to direct its Judiciary Committee to investigate wrongdoing by the President during the Panic of 1907. Roosevelt had, on December 8, 1908, included in his annual message to Congress the statement that Congress opposed the expansion of the Secret Service because there were "criminals in the legislative branch".
- Born: Willy Millowitsch, German actor and director; in Cologne (d. 1999)
- Died: Harry Seeley, 69, British paleontologist (b. 1839)

== January 9, 1909 (Saturday) ==
- The Nimrod Expedition to the South Pole, led by Ernest Shackleton, arrived further south than any prior expedition, at 88°23' S, within 97 nautical miles (180 km; 112 mi) of the Pole. On the 6th, Shackleton had realized that he did not have enough rations left to reach the pole, but planted the flag of the United Kingdom within less than 100 nautical miles (190 km). The crew then made its way back to Nimrod.
- Colombia formally recognized the independence of Panama, which had seceded in 1903 with the help of the United States. Under the terms of a trilateral treaty, Panama would pay "rental" to Colombia at the rate of $250,000 per annum for ten years, and the United States would give Colombia special privileges in the use of the canal.
- The Mauritanian emirate of Adrar became a French protectorate. Emir Shaykh al-Hasana was deposed and replaced by Sidi Ahmad wuld Ahmd 'Ayda.
- The very first issue of La Follette's Weekly Magazine was published, and opened with an article by Lincoln Steffens. Founded by U.S. Senator Robert M. La Follette, the new magazine billed itself as "A publication that will not mince words or suppress facts, when public welfare demands plain talk, about public men, legislative measures, or social and industrial wrongs.". La Follette's Weekly Magazine, Vol. 1, No. 1. In 1929, it would be re-branded as a monthly magazine and become The Progressive.
- Born: Anthony Mamo, the first President of Malta (1974 to 1976); in Birkirkara (d. 2008)

== January 10, 1909 (Sunday) ==
- In Sion, Switzerland, 40 worshippers were killed and 60 others injured when their church collapsed during services. The pillars of an ancient crypt beneath the church had given way.
- The explosion at the Leiter Colliery in Zeigler, Illinois, killed 26 coal miners. Only two men survived the blast.

== January 11, 1909 (Monday) ==
- The Boundary Waters Treaty was signed by U.S. Secretary of State Elihu Root and British Ambassador to the United States James Bryce, at Root's home. Ratified by both nations in 1910, the treaty regulated the usage of all waters shared by the United States and Canada, including the Great Lakes and Niagara Falls.
- The death penalty was carried out in France for the first time since the turn of the 20th century, as the four murderers in the Pollet gang died on the guillotine as a crowd in Béthune cheered.
- William Howard Taft was elected President of the United States, receiving 321 of the electoral votes won in the election held on November 3. Challenger William Jennings Bryan got the other 162 votes.
- Died: Joseph Wharton, 82, American industrialist and education benefactor who co-founded Bethlehem Steel company and Swarthmore College, and later endowed the Wharton School of the University of Pennsylvania, one of the most prestigious business schools in the world (b. 1826)

== January 12, 1909 (Tuesday) ==
- A mine explosion at Switchback, West Virginia, killed at least 105 men and trapped another 100. The blast, which occurred at 8:30 in the morning, happened fifteen days after 51 men had been killed at the same mine (December 28, 1908).
- Died: Professor Hermann Minkowski, 44, Polish mathematician and colleague of Albert Einstein and David Hilbert (b. 1864); from sepsis from appendicitis. Less than four months earlier, Minkowski had presented the mathematical framework, now known as "Minkowski spacetime", by which Einstein's theory could be explained. Before he could extend his work, however, he became ill late in 1908 and developed peritonitis. Legend has it that on his deathbed at the hospital in Göttingen, he lamented, "What a pity that I have to die in the age of relativity's development."

== January 13, 1909 (Wednesday) ==
- Determined to make one more demonstration of his toughness in his last months in office, U.S. President Theodore Roosevelt set off to ride 100 miles (160 km) on horseback in one day. Accompanied by his military aide, Captain Archibald Butt, Navy Surgeon General Presley M. Rixey, and Surgeon C. D. Grayson, President Roosevelt set out at 3:40 a.m., riding to Warrenton, Virginia, and returned to the White House, the last 30 miles (48 km) in a blizzard, at 8:40 that evening. The press, however, gave him credit for only 98 miles (158 km). When reporters asked him for a quote, the President replied, "It was bully."
- Carrie Nation, infamous for her destruction of American saloons, was arrested at Newcastle upon Tyne for vandalizing a British pub. Nation, on a visit to the United Kingdom, was later released on bail.
- Born:
  - Danny Barker, American jazz banjoist; in New Orleans (d. 1994)
  - Marinus van der Lubbe, Dutch native who was charged with the burning of the German Reichstag in 1933; in Leiden (executed 1934)

== January 14, 1909 (Thursday) ==
- A methane explosion and fire at a coal mine in Ajka, Hungary, killed 55 miners. A museum would be erected at the site of the Armin Akna coal mine in 1965, along with a memorial plaque.
- Died:
  - Arthur William à Beckett, 64, English journalist, playwright and author (b. 1844)
  - Admiral Zinovy Rozhestvensky, 60, Imperial Russian Navy officer who commanded the Second Pacific Squadron and saw most of his ships sunk in the disastrous Battle of Tsushima, during the Russo-Japanese War (b. 1848). Rozhestvensky died in exile after having been court-martialed and taking full responsibility for the loss.

== January 15, 1909 (Friday) ==
- At Seoul, religious leader Na Cheol proclaimed the revival of the religion of Taejonggyo, announcing edicts for the worship of Dangun as the father and future savior of the Korean nation. According to tradition, Dangun Wanggeom (also called Tan'gun) had been the incarnation of the god Hanul and founded the Kingdom of Korea in 2333 BC. Japanese troops occupying Korea worked to suppress the nationalist religion.
- Born:
  - Jean Bugatti, German-born automobile designer; in Cologne (killed in accident, 1939)
  - Gene Krupa, American jazz drummer; in Chicago (d. 1973)
- Died: Saint Arnold Janssen, 71, German Roman Catholic priest and missionary who founded the Society of the Divine Word (b. 1837); Janssen would be canonized in 2003 by Pope John Paul II.

== January 16, 1909 (Saturday) ==
- Edgeworth David, Douglas Mawson and Alistair Mackay became the first persons to reach the South Magnetic Pole—or rather, it reached them. The three geologists had arrived at a spot at 72°42' S the day before, and had determined with a magnetic dip compass that the dip was only 15 feet (4.6 m) from vertical. As described by Stonehouse, "There, they calculated that within 24 hours the shifting pole would come to them." The Union Jack was planted at the spot and the explorers made their way back to the ship Nimrod.
- Born: Ethel Merman (stage name for Ethel Zimmerman), American singer and actress; in Queens, New York City (d. 1984)

== January 17, 1909 (Sunday) ==
- In Russia, a police decree was issued banning music in all cinemas. The ban, which was soon rescinded, is believed by film historian Yuri Tsivian to have been an attempt to "extort bribes from exhibitors, since by that time music was already felt to be an essential accompaniment to films." However, censors continued to ban the playing of music during the showing of any newsreels of the Tsar or his family.

== January 18, 1909 (Monday) ==
- Robert Franklin Stroud of Juneau, Alaska, shot and killed Charlie Von Dahmer. Convicted of manslaughter at 18, Stroud spent the rest of his life in federal prisons. While in Leavenworth, where he murdered a guard, he raised canaries and authored two books, Diseases of Canaries and Stroud's Digest on the Diseases of Birds. He would be immortalized as The Birdman of Alcatraz in a book and a film of the same name. However, by the time that he was transferred to Alcatraz in 1942, his work with canaries had stopped. Stroud died on November 21, 1963.
- Congressman William Willett, Jr. (D-N.Y.) denounced outgoing President Theodore Roosevelt, in terms so outrageous that the House voted 126–78 to terminate his speech. The Washington Post described the speech as "so bitter and sensational that it seemed as though its author had raked the dictionary for adjectives to vilify the chief executive". By the time that he said "the Gargoyle is about to grin its last grin", he was being ruled out of order, and he skipped to the end to say "the Nero who fiddled while Rome was burning will be out of power on March 4th." By voice vote on January 27, the House expunged the speech from the Congressional Record for "language improper".

== January 19, 1909 (Tuesday) ==
- The Jersey Devil returned to the Pinelands of Southern New Jersey at 2:00 a.m., after an absence of more than 35 years. Mr. and Mrs. Nelson Evans of Gloucester City told a reporter for the Philadelphia Bulletin that the winged lizard had spent ten minutes on the roof of their woodshed. The Bulletin story, and an accompanying sketch, were soon picked up by papers across the nation. The Washington Post described the creature as having "a head like a collie dog, and a face like a horse... a long neck, wings about 8 feet long, and it whines at intervals. Its tail is described by one Jerseyman as 'glowing like a coal of fire'. The Post commented that "Chills are running up and down the South Jersey spine like a monkey on a stick". The mysterious creature became a fixture of the state's folklore, and is now the mascot for Newark's National Hockey League team.
- After a personal appeal from President Roosevelt, California Governor James Gillett met with state legislative leaders to stop further progress on anti-Japanese legislation. "There can be no doubt that the Japanese Government is acting absolutely in good faith in its endeavor to prevent its people from emigrating to our country", said the Governor, "and in my judgment it would be a serious mistake while they are so doing to enact any laws directed against the Japanese people." A bill proposed to limit Japanese-American residents of San Francisco to residing in its Chinatown district, to bar their children from attending public schools, and to bar them from serving as directors of a corporation.
- Born: Hans Hotter, German opera singer; in Offenbach am Main (d. 2003)

== January 20, 1909 (Wednesday) ==
- A fire at the 68th Street water crib, which supplied drinking water to Chicago from Lake Michigan, killed 70 construction workers. Most were burned to death, but some died after jumping into the icy lake waters.
- General Motors purchased a one-half interest in the Oakland Motor Company of Pontiac, Michigan, acquiring full control after the death a few months later of its founder, Edward Murphy. After the creation of the Pontiac division as a companion to Oakland in 1926, GM would discontinue the Oakland Motor division in 1932.
- Born:
  - William "Spike" Eckert, MLB Commissioner 1965 to 1968; in Madison, Indiana (d. 1971);
  - Gogen Yamaguchi, Japanese karate teacher; in Miyakonojō, Miyazaki Prefecture (d. 1989)

== January 21, 1909 (Thursday) ==
- Japan and Russia rejected U.S. Secretary of State Knox's proposal for railways in Manchuria to be neutral.
- Heavy rains fell in France, Germany and Italy, and the Seine River flooded Paris.
- Born: Todor Skalovski, Macedonian composer; in Tetovo, Kosovo vilayet Ottoman Empire (now in North Macedonia) (d. 2004)

== January 22, 1909 (Friday) ==
- The National Conservation Commission released its final report. President Roosevelt endorsed it as "one of the most fundamentally important documents ever laid before the American people". Later, Roosevelt would comment that the report "was not only the first inventory of our resources, but was unique in the history of Government in the amount and variety of information brought together. It was completed in six months. It laid squarely before the American people the essential facts regarding our natural resources..."
- Born:
  - U Thant, Burmese diplomat who served as the United Nations Secretary General from 1961 to 1971; in Pantanaw (d. 1974)
  - Ann Sothern, American film actress; as Harriette Arlene Lake; in Valley City, North Dakota (d. 2001)

== January 23, 1909 (Saturday) ==
- The steamer Republic, with 461 people on board, began sinking 26 miles (42 km) out to sea, shortly after being struck by the SS Florida. Except for 6 people killed in the collision, everyone was saved because the Republic had the latest technology, a wireless telegraph. Jack Binns sent the CQD distress signal that was picked up at a rescue station at Siasconset, Massachusetts, then relayed to other ships. At 15,378 tons, the Republic was, at the time, the largest ship to have been lost. The wreckage would be located in 1981. Binns briefly became a worldwide celebrity.
- Centered at Darb-e Astaneh in the Lorestān Province of Iran, an earthquake destroyed 64 villages and killed more than 6,000 people. More recently, the 2006 Borujerd earthquake struck the same region on March 31, 2006.
- The Tottenham Outrage, an armed robbery and double murder, occurred in Tottenham, Middlesex, and Walthamstow, Essex. It was perpetrated by two anarchists, Paul Helfeld and Jacob Lepidus, who both later committed suicide. Twenty-five casualties were reported, two fatal and several serious.

== January 24, 1909 (Sunday) ==
- Robert H. Goddard first realized the potential for explosives to raise a rocket, as he described it, "without employing the air". His insight, recorded in a daily journal, was that "if an explosive... is burned in tubes in such a way that all its energy is converted into kinetic energy of the particles expelled and the body propelled, it is, theoretically, possible to obtain propulsion". Goddard's discovery paved the way for space exploration.
- Born: Martin Lings, British Islamic scholar; in Manchester (d. 2005)
- Died: Petre S. Aurelian, 75, Romanian engineer and politician who served as the nation's Prime Minister for four months in 1896 and 1897 (b. 1833)

== January 25, 1909 (Monday) ==
- The White House Conference on the Care of Children was convened in Washington by President Roosevelt. Attended by 200 prominent personages, including Jacob Riis, Jane Addams, Booker T. Washington, and Theodore Dreiser, the conference led to a significant social reform in America. As one commentator would later note, "Reform meant an end to orphanages, the beginning of direct aid to 'parents of worthy character,' allowing children to remain in their homes, or, in time, foster homes."
- At Dresden, Richard Strauss's opera Elektra was performed for the first time. The production, based on the Greek myth as adapted by Hugo von Hofmannsthal, was not well-reviewed at the time, but is now considered one of Strauss's greatest works.

== January 26, 1909 (Tuesday) ==
- In Heidelberg, German astronomer Max Wolf discovered SN 1909a, the first supernova observed from Earth in the Pinwheel Galaxy, and only the 11th observed overall. The nova itself happened more than 27 million years earlier in the galaxy, located that many light years distant, in the direction of Ursa Major.
- A trial in British India brought out a conspiracy to set up an independent kingdom there.

== January 27, 1909 (Wednesday) ==
- Samuel G. Cosgrove was sworn in as the sixth Governor of Washington, and requested an immediate leave of absence for health reasons. Lieutenant Governor Marion E. Hay acted in his place. Cosgrove did not recover from Bright's disease and died two months later.
- The political party Young Left (Unge Venstre) was founded in Norway.
- Died: Benoît-Constant Coquelin, 68, French stage actor (b. 1841)

== January 28, 1909 (Thursday) ==
- José Miguel Gómez was inaugurated as the President of Cuba, the first since Tomás Estrada Palma in 1906. Gomez succeeded American Governor Charles Magoon.
- Born: Lionel Crabb, British spy and diver; in London (disappeared 1956)

== January 29, 1909 (Friday) ==
- Henderson Cremeans, of Point Pleasant, West Virginia, died while walking home from a grocery store. His death made headlines across the nation, because he was reportedly 115 years old. Cremeans, said to have been born in 1794, was never verified as a supercentenarian, nor was his mother, who was said to "have died aged 120". He reportedly was survived by 70 grandchildren, 131 great-grandchildren, and 19 great-great-grandchildren, and "he never tasted liquor or tobacco in his life".
- A minor tremor shook the Spanish city of Málaga. The Associated Press soon reported that a tidal wave had destroyed Barcelona. By Sunday, it was confirmed that "the reports emanating from England relative to a disastrous earthquake and a tidal wave are untrue".

== January 30, 1909 (Saturday) ==
- At the Eisstadion in Davos, Switzerland, Oscar Mathisen broke the record for the 1,000-meter speed skating event, set almost nine years earlier by Peder Østlund.
- President Roosevelt conferred with U.S. Mint Director Leach and gave his approval for the placement of the image of President Lincoln on an American coin. Sculptor Victor D. Brenner had submitted several designs, and it was believed that the half dollar would bear the design.
- Died: Martha Finley (pen name for Martha Farquharson), 80, American author of children's books, best known for her Elsie Dinsmore (between 1867 and 1905) and Mildred Keith (between 1876 and 1894) series of books (b. 1828)

== January 31, 1909 (Sunday) ==
- The capsizing of the Australian steamship SS Clan Ranald killed 40 of its 64 crew off of the coast of Troubridge Island in the state of South Australia."Appalling shipwreck". South Australian Register. February 2, 1909. p. 5 – via Trove. With the exception of eight officers, nearly all of the crew were "lascars", primarily from India. Residents of the island helped save 24 who had gotten close to shore. Some who had avoided drowning died of hypothermia. An inquiry on the accident revealed that the crew of another freighter, Uganda, that could have come to rescue Clan Ranald saw distress rockets that had been fired, but that the captain of the Uganda chose to ignore the signals.
- The New York World announced a $10,000 prize, largest to that time, for the first person who could, before October 10, 1910, fly the 135 miles (217 km) from New York to Albany, whether in an airship or an airplane, as part of the Hudson-Fulton Celebration. Glenn Curtiss won the contest, on May 29, 1910, in a biplane.
