= Jules-Henri Desfourneaux =

French executioner (1877–1951)

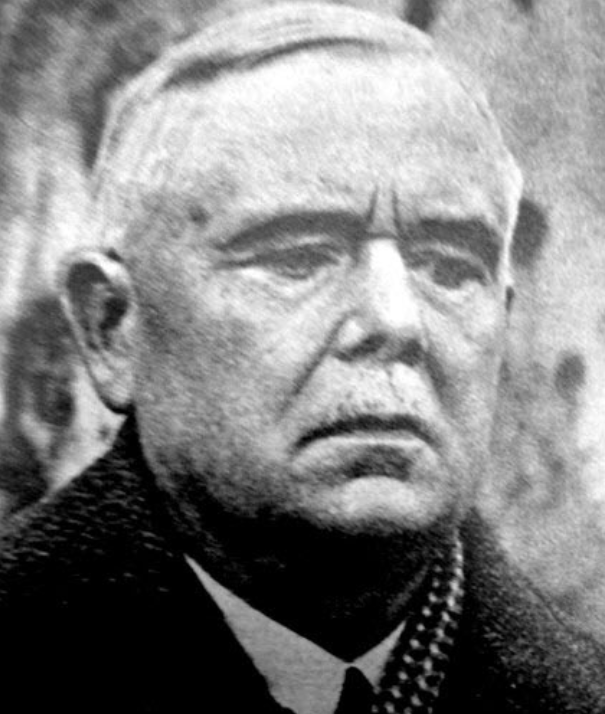
- Born: 17 December 1877; Bar-le-Duc, France
- Died: 1 October 1951 (aged 73); Paris, France
- Other name: Henri Desfourneaux
- Occupation: Executioner
- Years active: 1909–1951
- Spouse: Georgette Rogis (m. 1909)
- Children: 2

Jules-Henri Desfourneaux (French pronunciation: [ʒyl ɑ̃ʁi defuʁno]; 17 December 1877 – 1 October 1951) was a French executioner who served as the 5th Monsieur de Paris from 1939 until 1951. He was the last executioner to officiate in public. Desfourneaux participated in around 350 executions and officiated as the chief executioner among 190 of them.

== Early life and family ==
Desfourneaux was born in Bar-le-Duc to Nicolas Ernest Desfourneaux and Catherine Jeannot, as the youngest of three children; a fourth brother was stillborn in 1879. His father was a shirt tailor and carpenter while his mother was a homemaker. Following the death of his mother on 16 May 1892, Desfourneaux's father moved the family to the 14th arrondissement of Paris.

Desfourneaux's paternal family acted as executioners for several prefectures and subprefectures in central France, the earliest known being Jean Desfourneaux from 1706 to 1747 in Vierzon. There were at least twelve Desfourneaux executioners between the 18th and 19th centuries in Vierzon, Issoudun, Bourges, Moulins, Metz, Blois, and Châteauroux, sometimes as many as three generations. Nicolas Ernest Desfourneaux, however, had chosen not to pursue the family profession in the mid-19th century, not long before local executions were abolished in 1870 and restructured to be performed by a national chief executioner office.

== Career ==
As a youth, Desfourneaux gained a keen interest in the make and design of velocipedes, particularly those powered by internal combustion engines. Desfourneaux became a motorboat mechanic and worked abroad as a teenager, including Russia and India. On 30 December 1895, he enlisted in the Troupes de marine for four years, not including eleven months of training. Desfourneaux was stationed in French Indochina between 1897 and 1899. He was secretive about his life before becoming an executioner, but it is known that he got a tattoo on his left hand during this time, a snake coiling around a dagger. It was noted that this was a common motif amongst mariners, specifically to convey a desire for vengeance, but Desfourneaux refused to tell anyone his reason for this design choice.

=== Substitute assistant ===
Returning to France in the early 1900s, Desfourneaux entered an affair with Parisian woman Juliette Foussadier, who gave birth to his son Fernand in 1905. In 1907, he became the fiancée of Georgette Rogis, a common-law niece of chief executioner Anatole Deibler and member of another prominent executioner family. Two distant cousins of Desfourneaux, Edouard and Léopold Desfourneaux, were working as assistants under Deibler. After they were formally introduced, Deibler, who did not have a son to serve as a potential successor to the chief executioner title, recruited his prospective nephew as an occasional substitute executioner's assistant in late 1908. He attended his first execution on 11 January 1909 in Béthune, when the four leaders of the Pollet Gang were executed. On 17 April 1909, the couple married in a ceremony held at the high-class Le Pré Catelan restaurant in Bois de Boulogne, after which Desfourneaux partook more often in Deibler's executions, though keeping his primary work as a mechanic.

Desfourneaux's domestic life was tumultuous. Desfourneaux had been secretly caring for his illegitimate firstborn, which he continued to do after the birth of his son René in 1910. His wife Georgette, despite being 12 years his junior, was controlling of the household's finances, which influenced Desfourneaux's spending habits. Georgette also made Desfourneaux go by Henri rather than Jules as she "hated the name" and forced him to burn off his snake tattoo. Desfourneaux's son René also seemed uninterested in becoming an executioner.

=== Second assistant ===
After having servec during World War I, Desfourneaux received the title of second executioner's assistant in 1919. In May 1922, Desfourneaux met André Obrecht, his common-law cousin, when Deibler hired him as a second assistant. Both men instantly disliked one another, as Obrecht criticised Desfourneaux for his perceived slowness and clumsy performance during executions. Desfourneaux himself grew increasingly uneasy after each execution and would not be on speaking terms for some time. In 1926, Desfourneaux began operating an auto repair shop with René in the 16th arrondissement of Paris.

=== First assistant ===
On 7 February 1930, Desfourneaux was named first assistant after the death of its previous holder, his father-in-law Louis Rogis. The position made it so that he was to replace Deibler in case of death, unless Deibler explicitly named a different successor.

On 2 November 1934, René Desfourneaux died by suicide in Le Havre, aged 24, following a failed romantic relationship. The death of his son caused Desfourneaux to become depressed and he began abusing alcohol in order to cope with the loss. He closed down his auto shop during this time and instead took a job as a delivery driver for an electronics manufacturer.

On 14 January 1938, Desfourneaux performed his first direct execution in Saint-Brieuc, as Deibler was unavailable due to illness. 23-year-old Lucien Boulay was executed for the rape and murder of 9-year-old Thérèse Rouault.

=== Chief executioner ===
When Anatole Deibler died of a heart attack in February 1939, it was yet undecided who would take the chief executioner office. On 4 February, two days after Deibler's death, Desfourneaux executed Maurice Pilorge for the murder of his lover Néstor Escudero. Pilorge was meant to be executed by Deibler on the day of his death as his 300th beheading in the chief executioner role and had been given a stay of execution as a result.

Given the choice between Desfourneaux and Obrecht, Deibler's widow Rosalie spoke in favor of Desfourneaux, since he had amassed a large debt and would be unable to repay her if he did not earn a high salary. Desfourneaux's official appointment followed on 15 March, with Obrecht becoming Desfourneaux's first assistant. In total, he performed 190 executions in this position.

Over the next three months, Desfourneaux presided over the final three public executions in France:

- 5 May 1939 in Rouen: 17-year-old André Vitel, for the murder of his 28-year-old sister-in-law Alice Anne and 2-month-old nephew Michel. Vitel became the last juvenile to be executed.
- 2 June 1939 in Paris (La Santé Prison): 44-year-old Max Bloch, for the murder of the Gutowicz couple during a burglary. Bloch, a Ukrainian Jew (born in Yekaterinoslav, mistakenly also described as German or Polish), used his last words to say, in German, "Nieder, Hitler!" ("Down [with] Hitler!"), though he himself had murdered two Polish Jews.
- 17 June 1939 in Versailles: 31-year-old Eugène Weidmann, for five counts of murder. This execution was also notable as it is one of the few ever filmed, having been shot from a private apartment near the prison. For reasons unknown, Desfourneaux insisted that the official hour of execution be set after Greenwich meridian rather than Paris meridian for summertime dawn. This meant that contrary to custom, Weidmann was executed in broad daylight.

Due to the public revelry around the jail (cafes were given an all-night licence extension, wine flowed and jazz blared on radios) and the filmed evidence, Weidmann's execution was largely responsible for Prime Minister Èdouard Daladier's decision on 24 June to hold all future executions behind closed doors. The first privately held execution was on 19 July in Saint-Brieuc, beheading 35-year-old Jean-François Dehaene, who killed his 30-year-old wife Alice Sorel and her 60-year-old father Victor during a divorce hearing.

==== Executioner under Vichy government ====
Desfourneaux was involved in further controversy during World War II when required by the Vichy Government to execute communists and members of the French Resistance, notably French partisan leader Marcel Langer, which led to the resignation of his assistants, André Obrecht and the Martin brothers, Georges and Robert. He was also responsible for the first guillotining of women since the 19th century, executing five, starting with Élisabeth Lamouly on 8 January 1941. He also executed two abortionists, most famously Marie-Louise Giraud on 30 July 1943, and Giraud's colleague Désiré Piogé on 22 October 1943.

He executed at least 19 people for being accused communists, but records between 1944 and 1945 are largely unavailable. On 30 April 1944, he performed his last executions on behalf of the Nazi government, beheading nine men accused of being communists. Since transport lines came under increased attacks by partisans, which hampered the shipment of the guillotine, the executions were done by firing squad through German troops beginning June 1944.

==== Post-war ====
After the war, Desfourneaux was investigated for collaboration with the enemy, but eventually found not guilty. The stress and guilt of his actions worsened Desfourneaux's alcoholism. He was rejoined as first assistant in 1945 by Obrecht, who, despite his increasing dislike of Desfourneaux, could see a potential future as chief executioner looming. Between the liberation of France and January 1947, the majority of executions were performed by firing squad through French military. In this time, only three were done by guillotine:

- 25 May 1946 in Paris: 49-year-old Marcel Petiot for 26 counts of murders.
- 12 December in Paris: 28-year-old Michel Roblès for the murder of Gabrielle Fauvet during a break-in.
- 17 December in Versailles: 32-year-old Henri Audinet for the murder of the Deville couple, who were his cousin and her husband, during a robbery.

Further disagreements followed between the cousins, and Obrecht resigned for the second time in 1947 after the men engaged in a brawl. The following year, there was an influx of executions, with at least 43 people being put to death.

Desfourneaux guillotined a further three women during the Fourth Republic era, while another woman, Geneviève Danelle, was executed by firing squad for treason and wartime collaboration. On 21 April 1949, Desfourneaux beheaded Germaine Leloy-Godefroy in Angers for the murder of her husband Albert Leloy, thus performing the last execution of a woman in France. His final execution was Gustave Maillot, on 29 June 1951, at 4:20 a.m. in Saint-Brieuc, for the murders of Auguste Iran, François Geffroy, and Geffroy's 15-year-old son. This was also the last execution to take place in Brittany.

The job of executioner had taken a severe mental toll on Desfourneaux over the years. Desfourneaux continued working as both an executioner and as a bicycle mechanic, though it was noted that he had lost his passion for mechanic work, often being seen sitting in his back office, staring at his phone awaiting an execution order by the Ministry of Justice.

== Death ==
On 1 October 1951, whilst still in office and almost insane, he died of a heart attack in the 10th arrondissement of Paris. He was interred in a mausoleum in Sèvres, next to his son and later his wife, who died in 1958.

By technicality, the office of chief executioner was taken over by his first assistant, Marcel Deschamps, who had already been serving under Deibler, but did not perform any executions during this time. Obrecht, who had semi-retired to Casablanca with his wife, took the chief executioner office on 1 November 1951 and officiated until 1976, one year before the last two executions in France by Marcel Chevalier; the death penalty was abolished in 1981.

== Sources ==
- Flanner, Janet. Paris was Yesterday. 1972. The Viking Press, 1972. Print.

Government offices
Preceded by Anatole Deibler	Chief Executioner of the French Republic; 15 March 1939 – 1 October 1951	Succeeded by André Obrecht
