= Jean de Koven =

American ballet dancer and dance tutor who was murdered

- Born: 1915; Boston, Massachusetts, United States
- Died: July 23, 1937 (aged 24); Paris, France
- Occupations: Ballet dancer, classical dance tutor
- Known for: Homicide victim of serial killer Eugen Weidmann

Jean de Koven (29 March 1913 – 23 July 1937) was an American ballet dancer and dance tutor from Boston, Massachusetts, who was murdered in Paris, France, in July 1937.

She had been staying with her aunt, Ida Sackheim, in a hotel on the Left Bank, where she disappeared on the afternoon of 23 July.

Her body was discovered beneath the front porch of a villa at La Celle-Saint-Cloud on December 8, 1937. De Koven was the first of six victims of German-born serial killer Eugen Weidmann, also known as "Karrer", a gang leader who confessed to his crimes and had as many as nine accomplices.

== Resolution of crime ==
De Koven resided in Brooklyn, New York, before going abroad. She taught classical dancing and had trained ballet students in New Jersey schools. She arrived in Normandy on July 19. Before vanishing, De Koven was corresponding with a man who resided in another hotel in Paris from which he later moved away. On the afternoon of her disappearance, she took her camera and told her aunt that she would return by 8pm, in time to go to the opera.

Sackheim received a letter requesting $500 for her niece's safe return, which police investigated. Later ransom notes arrived and she received mysterious telephone calls. Police could not locate the contact man even though he advertised frequently in the Paris edition of an American newspaper. By September, Sackheim offered a reward requesting information which would lead to the finding of De Koven's presumed abductors.

Police found De Koven's body doubled up in a shallow grave under a porch. Weidmann's other victims were realtor Raymond Lesobre, theatrical producer Roger LeBlond, chauffeur Joseph Couffy, Fritz Frommer, a young German he had met in jail, and private nurse Janine Keller. LeBlond was lured to his car by one of two female "decoys", where he was killed at Neuilly.

== Killer's profile ==
Weidmann murdered De Koven in July 1937. A native of Frankfurt, Germany, he had come to Paris the previous March to avoid military service. In 1926, at the age of 18, he emigrated to Canada where he joined a gang that robbed a wheat company's paymaster in Saskatchewan. He was sentenced to a year in prison and was later deported. Weidmann served prison time in Frankfurt for assault and robbery before he was released in December 1936.

Weidmann and his helpers preyed on people who appeared wealthy, mainly American and English tourists. It is thought that he met De Koven while he was working as an interpreter at the Paris Exhibition. He spoke English and French fluently. Police traced him to an expensive dance bar, the Pavillon Bleu, in La Celle-Saint-Cloud, about a 15-minute walk from his villa. Weidmann strangled his victims or shot them from behind. He apparently had a fetish for men's shoes, as the four men he murdered were found shoeless.

== Funeral ==
A funeral service was held for De Koven in the West End Funeral Chapel, 200 West 91st Street, in New York City, on December 31, 1937. Rabbi I. Mortimer Bloom of Temple Oheb Shalom (257 W 93rd St) performed the ceremony. Bloom knew De Koven from her youth and remarked "there was something fine, distinctive, and superior about Jean, even in her childhood." She is buried in Mount Carmel Cemetery, Queens, New York.
