= Marie-Louise Giraud =

French abortionist (1903–1943)

Marie-Louise Giraud (French pronunciation: [maʁi lwiz ʒiʁo]; 17 November 1903 – 30 July 1943) was one of the last women to be executed in France. Giraud was convicted in Vichy France and was guillotined for having performed 27 abortions, one of which resulted in the death of the mother, in the Cherbourg area on 30 July 1943. Her story was dramatized in the 1988 film Story of Women directed by Claude Chabrol.

== Background ==
Marie-Louise Giraud, at the age of 39, was guillotined on the morning of 30 July 1943, in the courtyard of the prison de la Roquette in Paris by executioner Jules-Henri Desfourneaux for having performed 27 abortions in the region of Cherbourg. She was the only faiseuse d'anges (French slang: literally "female maker of angels") to be executed for this reason. That said, a man was executed for the same reason later that year. Désiré Pioge was guillotined on 22 October 1943 for performing three abortions. Bolin had previously been twice convicted of performing illegal abortions, in 1935 and 1939. He served 18 months in prison for manslaughter in the second case after the mother died.

Coming from a poor family, Giraud was married to a sailor, with whom she had two children. She worked as a domestic housekeeper and laundress. From the beginning of World War II, she also rented rooms to prostitutes. She began to perform abortions, initially without compensation.

== Political context ==
The law of 1920, which criminalized abortion, had the following aims:

- to fill the hole in the population due to the bloodshed of the 1914–1918 war
- to boost the birth rate, which was chronically lower in France than in neighboring countries (including Germany), and had been for over a century

The law of 27 March 1923, stated that whoever caused the miscarriage of a woman shall be punished by one to five years imprisonment and a fine of 500 to 10,000 FF. Also, the woman who had aborted risked six months to two years in prison. A person charged with abortion was judged not by a jury, but by a panel of judges, as juries were believed to be swayed too easily by emotion.

In 1935, paralleling a similar movement in the United States, Dr. Jean Dalsace opened Suresnes (Hauts-de-Seine), the first birth control clinic.

However, on 29 July 1939, a month before the invasion of Poland, the criminal penalties for abortion were increased. Economic deprivation, food shortages, and the separation of a large number of married couples (1.9 million French prisoners of war interned in Germany) led to pregnancies - out of wedlock or not - becoming fewer, but there was a greater demand for abortions, frequently for the victims of forced relationships with the occupying force. Therefore, the Law of 15 February 1942, made abortion a crime against state security, punishable by execution. The law was repealed after the Libération.

== The trial ==
At trial, the President stressed the "immorality" of the accused. Twenty-seven women had used Giraud's services. According to the Advocate General, the death penalty was "necessary" in Giraud's case. The court sentenced Giraud to death. Only a presidential pardon could save her life, but Marshal Pétain refused to commute the sentence.

Three other women, Eulalie Hélène, Jeanne Truffert, and Augustine Cosnefroy, were tried alongside Giraud as accomplices. They were sentenced to 5 years of hard labor, 8 years of hard labor, and 10 years imprisonment, respectively.

== Remarks ==
At the same time in 1942, the recently created College of Physicians was allowed to perform abortions not only if the mother's life was in danger, but also when her health was seriously compromised. Switzerland was also among the first countries to allow abortions if the life or health of the mother was in danger.

In July 2004, abortions under a physician's supervision were certified by the French Ministry of Health after the legalization of abortion in 1975.

== Bibliography ==
- Mireille Le Maguet, Une "faiseuse d'anges" sous Vichy : le cas Marie-Louise Giraud, Institut d'études politiques de Grenoble, Saint-Martin-d'Hères, 1996, 128 p. (Mémoire)
