= February 1909 =

Month in 1909

<<	February 1909					>>
Su	Mo	Tu	We	Th	Fr	Sa
	1	2	3	4	5	6
7	8	9	10	11	12	13
14	15	16	17	18	19	20
21	22	23	24	25	26	27
28

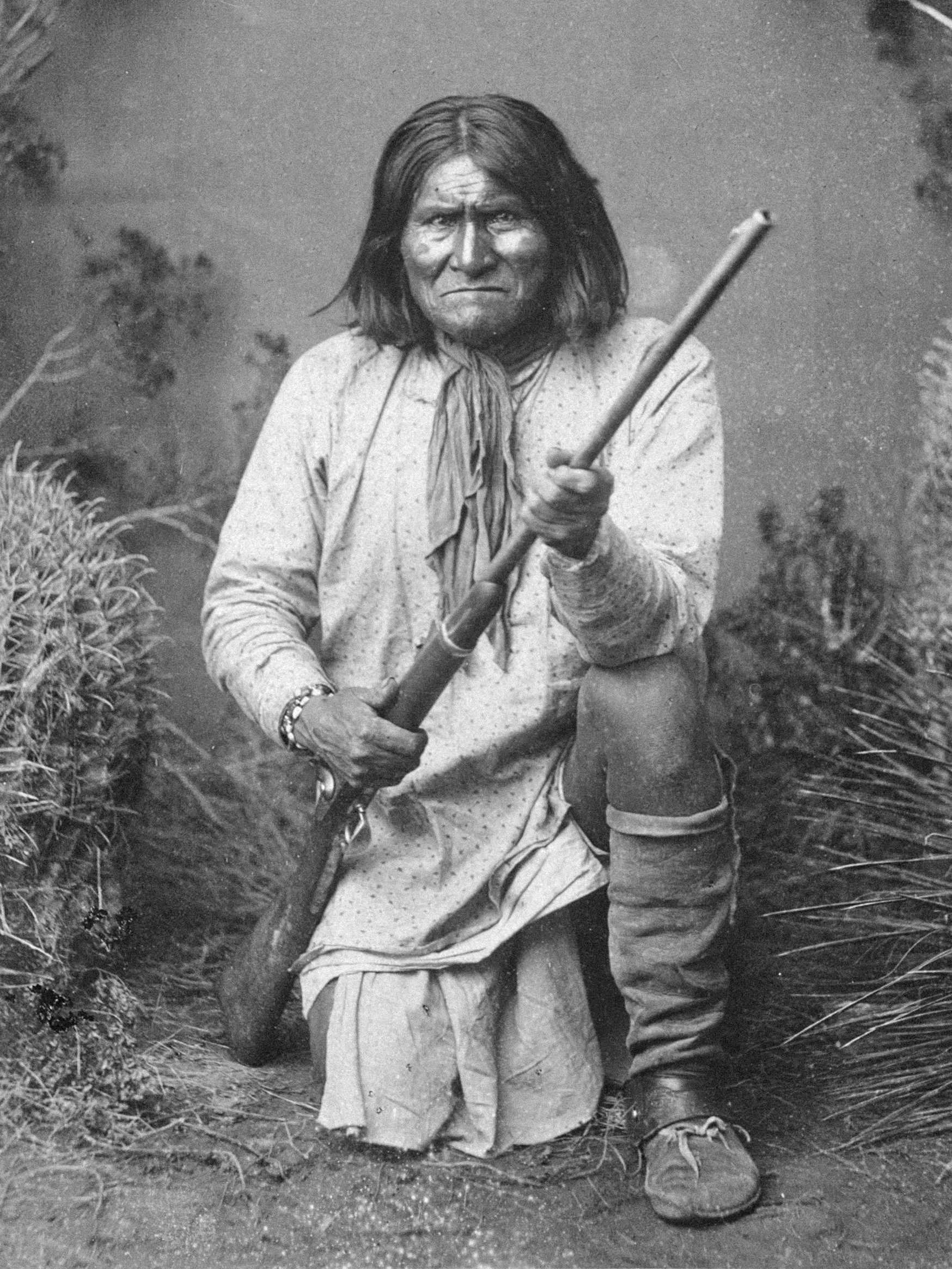
February 17, 1909: Geronimo, Chief of the Apaches, dead at 79

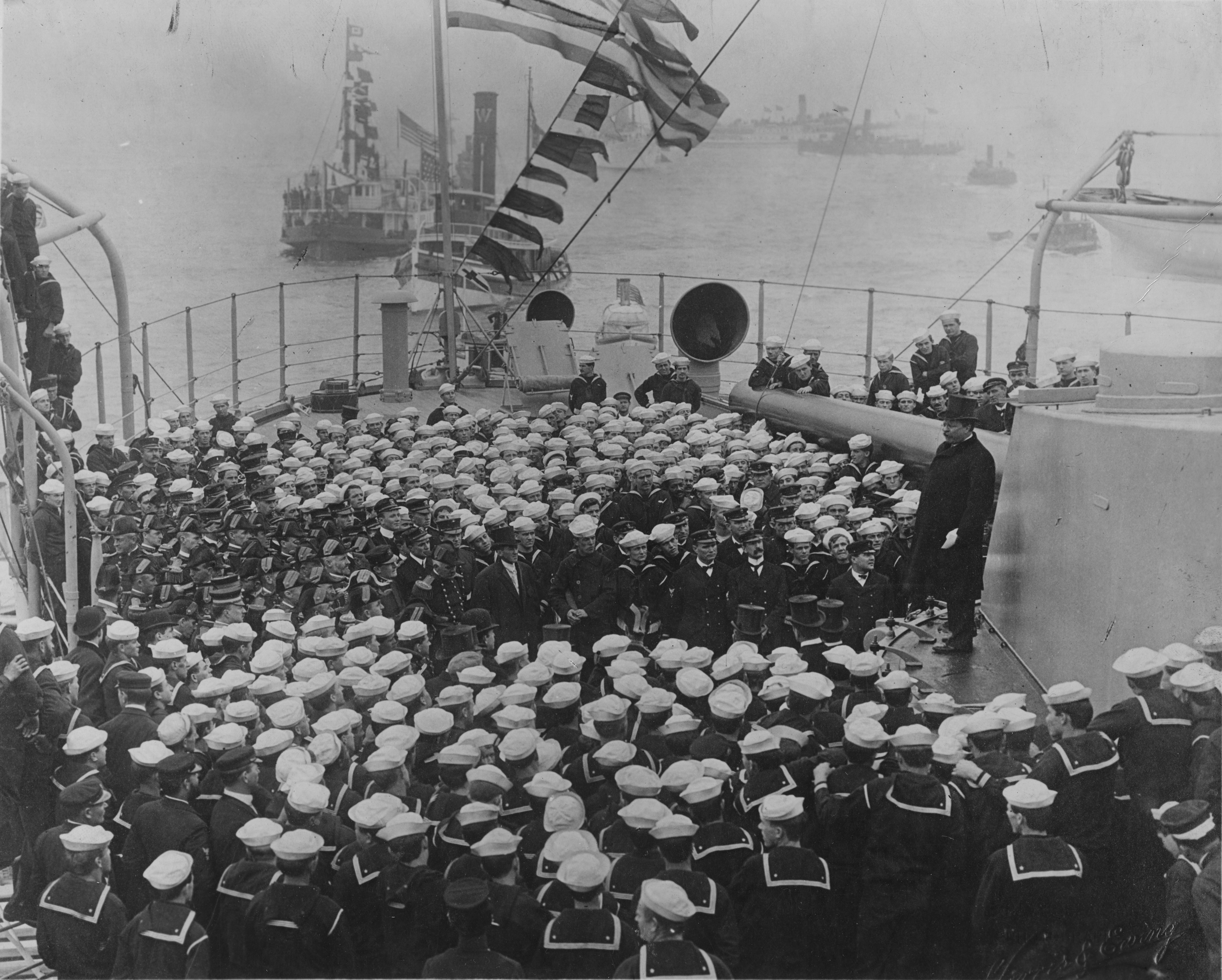
February 22, 1909: The Great White Fleet completes its round the world tour.

The following events occurred in February 1909:

== February 1, 1909 (Monday) ==
- In Fort Wayne, Indiana, Dr. Herman G. Niermann died four days after having part of his digestive tract removed to prove a theory. Dr. Niermann had theorized that a portion of the tract "serves as the cesspool of poisons of the body and becomes the culture bed of certain diseases" and persuaded a surgeon to operate upon him on January 28. Peritonitis set in and killed Dr. Niermann.
- Born: George Beverly Shea, gospel singer and songwriter; in Winchester, Ontario (d. 2013)

== February 2, 1909 (Tuesday) ==
- Francisco I. Madero challenged Porfirio Diaz, Mexico's president since 1884, to allow a free presidential election. Madero, author of the bestseller La sucesión presidencial en 1910, sent a copy of the book to President Diaz and then "began the greatest practical lesson that anyone had ever attempted in the history of Mexico". What followed was the Mexican Revolution of 1910; Madero toppled Diaz, but served only briefly until being assassinated himself.

== February 3, 1909 (Wednesday) ==
- A measure in California to forbid foreign ownership of land failed 48–28 in that state's House of Representatives.
- Born: Simone Weil, French philosopher, in Paris (d. 1943)

== February 4, 1909 (Thursday) ==
- The California House of Representatives voted 46–28 to pass a school segregation bill to "establish separate schools for Indian children and for children of Mongolian or Japanese or Chinese descent" to block Asian-Americans from attending school with White students. Bills prohibiting Asian-Americans from serving on corporate boards or from living outside districts both failed. The segregation bill moved on to the California State Senate.
- Edgeworth David and his crew successfully rendezvoused with the ship Nimrod.

== February 5, 1909 (Friday) ==
- Germany's legation (embassy) in Chile was destroyed by fire, and a charred body, thought to be that of Chancellor Wilhelm Beckert, was found in the ruins. After an investigation showed that a large amount of money had been embezzled, and that the corpse was not Beckert's, a manhunt for the diplomat began. Beckert was caught one week later in Chillán, and the victim turned out to be Exequiel Tapia, a Chilean porter employed at the legation. Germany turned over its former diplomat to the Chilean justice system, and Beckert was executed on July 5, 1910.
- At a meeting of the American Chemical Society at the Chemists' Club at 108 W. 55th Street in New York, Dr. Leo Baekeland announced his synthesis of a new chemical, obybenzyl-methylenglycolanhydride, which he called Bakelite. The polymer that Baekeland had created was "the first commercially useful artificial substance", and the first plastic.
- Clark County, Nevada, including Las Vegas, was created from the southern half of Lincoln County, by legislative action effective July 1, 1909.

== February 6, 1909 (Saturday) ==
- The Great White Fleet passed Gibraltar from the Mediterranean Sea to the Atlantic Ocean.

== February 7, 1909 (Sunday) ==
- The Namibian village of Schuckmannsburg was established by Captain Kurt Streitwolf in order to claim the Caprivi Strip, a 450 km-long (280 mi) buffer zone between the Portuguese and British colonies.
- Born: Wilhelm Freddie, Danish painter, in Copenhagen (d. 1995)

== February 8, 1909 (Monday) ==
- At his lawyer's office, Hiram Percy Maxim, son of machine gun inventor Hiram Maxim, demonstrated to reporters his new invention, the "Maxim silencer", a firearms sound suppressor. "I shall make war absolutely noiseless", he told the press.
- Died: Catulle Mendès, 67, French poet and playwright, was found dead inside a railway tunnel at Saint-Germain-en-Laye after having stepped out of a moving train after its departure from Paris.

== February 9, 1909 (Tuesday) ==
- The Maldivian island of Minicoy was signed over by its ruler, Imbicchi Ali-Adi Raja Bibi, to the Dominion of India.
- U.S. President Theodore Roosevelt signed into law a bill prohibiting the importation of opium into the United States. Importation would remain legal until April 1.
- Senator Philander C. Knox, President William Howard Taft's nominee for U.S. Secretary of State, was found to be constitutionally ineligible for the office because the salary for the post had been increased during his term. Article 1, Section 6, Paragraph 2 of the U.S. Constitution provided that "No Senator or Representative shall, during the term for which he was elected, be appointed to any civil office ... which shall have been created, or the emoluments whereof shall have been increased during such time." The problem was eventually solved by what would later be called the Saxbe fix (although it would not so named until 1973), by rolling back the salary for the position until March 3, 1911, when Knox's term would expire.
- Born:
  - Harald Genzmer, German classical composer, in Bremen (d. 2007)
  - Carmen Miranda, Portuguese-born Brazilian actress and singer; in Marco de Canaveses (d. 1955)
  - Dean Rusk, U.S. Secretary of State from 1961 to 1969; in Cherokee County, Georgia (d. 1994)

== February 10, 1909 (Wednesday) ==
- The "Saxbe fix" for Philander C. Knox's constitutional problems was sponsored by Senator Hale of Maine. After passing the Senate, the bill passed the House 173–112 and it was signed the next day.
- The California State Senate defeated the anti-Asian segregation bill that had passed the state House, but by a narrow margin, 41–37.

== February 11, 1909 (Thursday) ==
- With three weeks left until his inauguration, President-elect President William Howard Taft arrived back in the United States from his trip to Panama to cheering crowds at New Orleans. After arriving on the cruiser USS North Carolina, Taft boarded the USS Birmingham to sail up the Mississippi River.
- Born:
  - Max Baer, American boxer and world heavyweight champion 1934–1935); in Omaha, Nebraska (d. 1959)
  - Joseph Mankiewicz, American filmmaker known for All About Eve; in Wilkes-Barre, Pennsylvania (d. 1993)

== February 12, 1909 (Friday) ==
- As the centennial of Abraham Lincoln's birth was celebrated across the United States, President Theodore Roosevelt appeared at Hodgenville, Kentucky, for the laying of the cornerstone for a building to house a log cabin in which Lincoln was born.
- The New York Academy of Sciences celebrated the centennial of the birth of Charles Darwin.
- The National Association for the Advancement of Colored People (NAACP) was founded on the centennial of President Abraham Lincoln's birth, by a group that included W. E. B. Du Bois, Ida B. Wells, Archibald Grimké, Henry Moskowitz, Mary White Ovington, Oswald Garrison Villard, and William English Walling.
- The ferry SS Penguin began sinking off of Cape Terawhiti en route to Wellington, New Zealand, then exploded when the sea's waters flooded the boilers, killing 75 of the 105 passengers and crew.

== February 13, 1909 (Saturday) ==
- At a dinner in New York for his financial backers, Lee De Forest announced "I have succeeded in combining the wireless telegraph and telephone in one instrument ... Some day the news and even advertising will be sent out to the public over the wireless telephone." De Forest would demonstrate the technology on January 12, 1910.
- Died: Julius Thomsen, 82, Danish thermochemist known for postulating the Thomsen–Berthelot principle

== February 14, 1909 (Sunday) ==
- In Acapulco, Mexico, more than 250 persons were killed in a fire at the Flores Theatre. An estimated 1,000 persons were watching an exhibition of "moving pictures" when a film caught fire and the blaze spread to some bunting. With three narrow exits from the theatre, hundreds were either trampled or burned to death.

== February 15, 1909 (Monday) ==
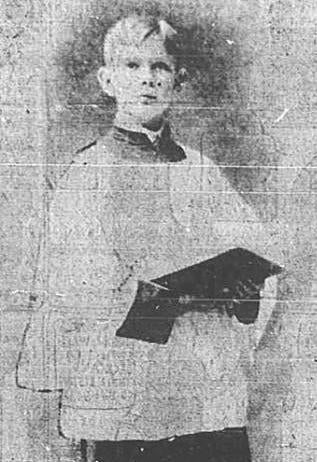
George Spencer Millet

- George Spencer Millet, an office boy at an insurance company at the Metropolitan Life Building in New York City, was fleeing six young women stenographers at his workplace intent on giving him kisses for his 15th birthday while carrying an ink eraser in his breast pocket. As the women moved in for their kisses, he fell forward, and the eraser's point pierced his heart, killing him.
- The U.S. House of Representatives unanimously passed a bill for statehood for the territories of Arizona and New Mexico. The Senate Territories Committee tabled the bill on February 27 after Minnesota's Senator Knute Nelson charged that New Mexican officials were corrupt. The two states would be admitted in 1912.
- On the same day, the Arizona Territorial Legislature, which had recently changed from Republican control to Democratic Party control, voted to abolish the eight-year-old Arizona Rangers, a law enforcement body modeled after the Texas Rangers. Since the creation of the Rangers on March 13, 1901, 107 men had served as Rangers.
- Park County, Wyoming, was created.
- Born: Miep Gies, Austrian-born Dutch humanitarian who helped hide Anne Frank and preserved her diary; in Vienna (d. 2010)

== February 16, 1909 (Tuesday) ==
- At the West Stanley Colliery in Stanley, County Durham, England, 160 coal miners were killed.
- Born: Hugh Beaumont, American TV actor who portrayed Ward Cleaver on Leave It to Beaver; in Eudora, Kansas (d. 1982)

== February 17, 1909 (Wednesday) ==
- Geronimo (Goyaałé), Bedonkohe Apache war chief who led the Apaches for twenty years in wars against white invaders of the Southwest United States, died of pneumonia at Fort Sill, Oklahoma. Six days earlier, the man born as Goyaałé had gone to Lawton, got drunk, fell off of his horse into a creek, and was not found until hours later, by which time illness had set in.
- Died: Grand Duke Vladimir Alexandrovich of Russia, 61, former Military Governor of St. Petersburg and uncle of Tsar Nicholas II

== February 18, 1909 (Thursday) ==
- U.S. President Theodore Roosevelt convened at the White House the first North American Conservation Conference, with delegates from the United States, Canada, and Mexico meeting at the East Room of the White House to discuss the conservation of the natural resources of the continent.
- Born: Wallace Stegner, American author; in Lake Mills, Iowa (d. 1993)

== February 19, 1909 (Friday) ==
- In New York, Clifford Beers convened the first meeting of the National Committee for Mental Hygiene, marking the beginning of the mental hygiene movement. The committee, later called the National Mental Health Association, and today Mental Health America, set as its mission the improvement of care for mental illness, as well as its prevention.
- In Nebraska, Policeman Edward Lowry of the South Omaha Police Department was shot and killed by John Masouriden, a prisoner he was escorting to the police station. Because Lowry's murderer was an immigrant from Greece, as pointed out by an inflammatory headline in a local newspaper, a revenge attack would be made on the Greek neighborhood in Omaha two days later.
- Born: Enrico Donati, Italian-born American surrealist sculptor and painter; in Milan (d. 2008)

== February 20, 1909 (Saturday) ==
- The Futurist Manifesto, written by Filippo Marinetti, was published in the Paris newspaper Le Figaro, launching the art form of futurism.
- The Hudson Motor Car Company was incorporated by Roy D. Chapin and seven other Detroit businessmen. Producing such vehicles as the Essex and the Terraplane, Hudson Motors lasted until January 14, 1954, when it merged with Nash-Kelvinator Corporation to form American Motors (AMC), which in turn merged with Chrysler in 1987.

== February 21, 1909 (Sunday) ==
- Rioting broke out in Omaha, Nebraska, as a mob of 3,000 men and boys smashed buildings in the Greek section of town, centered at 26th and Q Streets. Italians and Rumanians. After a Greek resident had killed an Omaha policeman on Friday, a local attorney reportedly told a gathered crowd, "The blood of an American is on the hands of those Greeks, and some method should be adopted to avenge his death and rid the city of this class of persons."
- President Roosevelt's nephew, Stewart Douglas Robinson, was killed after falling from the sixth floor of a dormitory room at Harvard University's Hampden Hall. Robinson, 19, was a sophomore at Harvard.
- Born: Hans Erni, Swiss painter and sculptor; in Lucerne (d. 2015)

== February 22, 1909 (Monday) ==
- With the USS Connecticut as the flagship, the Great White Fleet finished its round the world voyage. At 11:00 in the morning, the sixteen battleships and their escorts arrived at Hampton Roads, Virginia, where the fleet had departed more than a year earlier on December 16, 1907. President Roosevelt almost fell when his foot slipped while climbing up to a barbette on the USS Mayflower to address the Navy men as "the first battle fleet that has ever circumnavigated the globe".
- Born: Edmund Berkeley, American computer scientist; in New York City (d. 1988)

== February 23, 1909 (Tuesday) ==
- Canada's first airplane flight was accomplished when the Silver Dart, piloted by John McCurdy, took off from the ice-covered Bras d'Or Lake at Baddeck, Nova Scotia.

== February 24, 1909 (Wednesday) ==
- An international crisis began when the Kingdom of Serbia announced that it opposed Austria-Hungary's annexation of Bosnia and Herzegovina, and that the area should be part of a Greater Serbia. The Austro-Hungarian Empire prepared to go to war with Serbia, which backed down at the end of March.
- The United States Senate ratified the Ship Canal treaty that had been signed with Colombia on January 9.
- Grant County, Washington, was established from the southern section of Douglas County, and named in honor of Ulysses S. Grant.
- Born: August Derleth, American writer; in Sauk City, Wisconsin (d. 1971)

== February 25, 1909 (Thursday) ==
- Adventurer Hubert Latham accepted the challenge of flying the Antoinette IV, France's most advanced airplane to that time, to be the first person to fly a heavier-than-air machine across the English Channel. The future of the Antoinette Company (led by Leon Levavasseur and Jules Gastambide) would turn upon the airplane's success in competition, and though Latham made the attempt, it was Louis Blériot who would be the first to cross the channel, on July 27.
- Curry County, New Mexico, was established and named for George Curry, who was Territorial Governor at the time.
- Died: Caran d'Ache (pen name for Emmanuel Poiré), 50, French political cartoonist for Le Figaro

== February 26, 1909 (Friday) ==
- Cinemagoers saw the first color films, at the Palace Theatre in London, starting at 3:00 p.m., in what was billed as "The First Presentation of Kinemacolor", with 21 short subjects.
- The London Declaration concerning the Laws of Naval War was signed.
- The International Opium Commission completed its hearings in Shanghai and resolved that "the use of opium in any form otherwise than for medical purposes is hel by almoste every participating country to be a matter for prohibition or for careful regulation".
- The Austro-Hungarian Empire and the Ottoman Empire signed an agreement, whereby Turkey renounced all claims to Bosnia and Herzegovina in return for payment of 2.5 million Turkish pounds, and Italy renounced all claims to the Sanjak of Novi Pazar (in present-day Serbia and Montenegro). Both Empires lost the territory following the end of World War I.
- Harding County and Perkins County, South Dakota, were established.
- Born: King Talal of Jordan, who ruled from 1951 to 1952 until forced to abdicate because of mental illness; in Mecca, Kingdom of the Hejaz (now Saudi Arabia) (d. 1972)
- Died: Hermann Ebbinghaus, 59, German psychologist known for his research of memory and for describing what is now called the "learning curve" and the "forgetting curve"

== February 27, 1909 (Saturday) ==
- After more than 40 years of silence, William H. Flood gave an interview to the New York Times about the night that Lincoln was assassinated. Flood had been the first person to render aid to Lincoln after the shooting. "I always thought he was a bit 'cracked'", Flood said of John Wilkes Booth, "and I was sure of it as I saw him that night, looking pale and crazy like."

== February 28, 1909 (Sunday) ==
- Robert Peary, Matthew Henson and 22 other men set off from Ellesmere Island on the expedition to the North Pole. The final group would be Peary, Henson, and four Inuit men who would claim the Pole on April 6, though the dispute remains whether Peary or Frederick Cook were first to reach the pole.
- National Woman's Day (predecessor to International Women's Day) was celebrated for the first time, a creation of the Socialist Party of America. The day, now observed annually on March 8, has been sponsored by the United Nations since 1975.
- President Roosevelt broke a 120-year-old tradition "when he not only trod on foreign territory, but accepted the hospitality of a foreign power". Roosevelt walked into the Austrian Embassy on Connecticut Avenue to have lunch with Baron Hengelmuller, the ambassador.
