= Eugen Weidmann =

German serial killer (1908–1939)

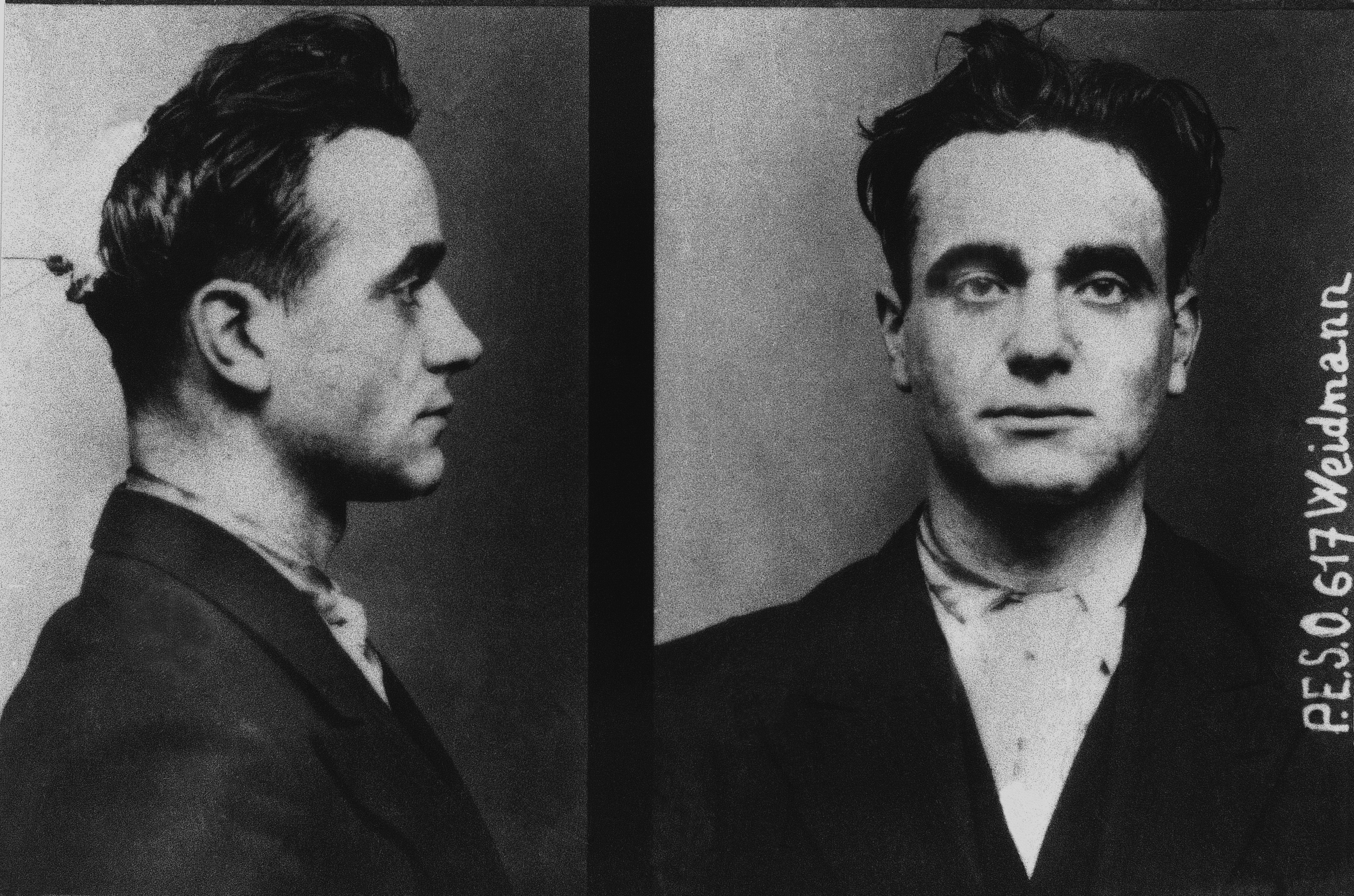
- Eugen Weidmann in 1937
- Born: 5 February 1908; Frankfurt, German Empire
- Died: 17 June 1939 (aged 31); Versailles, France
- Status: Executed by guillotine
- Motive: Financial gain
- Conviction: Murder (6 counts)
- Penalty: Death

Details
- Victims: 6
- Span of crimes: July – November 1937
- Country: France
- Date apprehended: 8 December 1937

Eugen Weidmann (5 February 1908 – 17 June 1939) was a German criminal and serial killer who was executed by guillotine in France in June 1939. His was the last public execution in France.

== Early life ==
Weidmann was born to a German Catholic family in Frankfurt am Main, and went to school there. His father was an export businessman. At the outbreak of World War I Weidmann was sent to live with his grandparents. During this time he began stealing.

In his twenties, Weidmann served five years in Saarbrücken Prison for robbery. During his time in prison, Weidmann met two men who would later become his partners in crime: Roger Million and Jean Blanc. After their release, they decided to work together to kidnap wealthy tourists visiting France and steal their money. The group rented a villa in Saint-Cloud near Paris for this purpose.

== Murders ==
Weidmann's first kidnapping attempt ended in failure because the victim struggled too hard, forcing Weidmann to let him go.

In July 1937, Weidmann made a second attempt. He made the acquaintance of Jean De Koven, a 22-year-old dancer from New York City visiting her aunt Ida Sackheim in Paris. Impressed by the tall, handsome German, De Koven wrote to a friend:

I have just met a charming German of keen intelligence who calls himself Siegfried. Perhaps I am going to another Wagnerian role – who knows? I am going to visit him tomorrow at his villa in a beautiful place near a famous mansion that Napoleon gave Josephine.

During their meeting they smoked, and "Siegfried" served De Koven a glass of milk. De Koven took photos of Weidmann with her new camera. Weidmann then strangled De Koven, and buried her body in the villa garden. De Koven had carried 300 francs in cash and $430 in traveller's cheques, which were cashed by Million's mistress, Colette Tricot. Sackheim received a letter demanding $500 for the return of her niece, and De Koven's brother Henry later came to France offering a 10,000-franc reward from his father, Abraham, for information about the young woman.

On 1 September 1937, Weidmann hired a chauffeur named Joseph Couffy to drive him to the French Riviera. In a forest outside Tours, Weidmann shot Couffy in the back of the neck and stole his car and 2,500 francs.

On 3 September, Weidmann and Million used a job offer to lure Janine Keller, a private nurse, into a cave in the forest of Fontainebleau. Weidmann killed Keller with another fatal shot to the back of the neck before robbing her body of 1,400 francs and a diamond ring.

On 16 October, Million and Weidmann arranged a meeting with a young theatrical producer named Roger LeBlond, promising to invest money in one of his shows. Instead, Weidmann shot LeBlond in the back of the head and took his wallet containing 5,000 francs.

On 22 November, Weidmann murdered and robbed Fritz Frommer, a young German he had met in jail. Frommer, a Jew, had been incarcerated there for his anti-Nazi views. Weidmann shot Frommer in the back of the neck, and buried his body in the basement of the Saint-Cloud house where De Koven's body was interred.

Five days later, Weidmann committed his final murder. Raymond Lesobre, a real estate agent, was shot in the killer's preferred fashion while showing him around a house in Saint-Cloud. 5,000 francs were taken from Lesobre's body.

== Arrest ==
Officers from the Sûreté, led by a young inspector named Primborgne, eventually tracked Weidmann to the villa by a business card left at Lesobre's office. Arriving at his home, Weidmann found two officers waiting for him. Inviting them in, he then turned and fired three times at them with a pistol. Although they were unarmed, the wounded Sûreté men managed to wrestle Weidmann down and knocked him unconscious with a hammer which happened to be nearby.

Weidmann proved a highly cooperative prisoner, and confessed to all of his murders, including that of De Koven, the only one for which he expressed regret. He is reported to have said tearfully: "She was gentle and unsuspecting. ... When I reached for her throat, she went down like a doll." De Koven's camera was discovered beside her body, loaded with film including photos of her killer.

The murder trial of Weidmann, Million, Blanc and Tricot took place in Versailles in March 1939, and was the biggest since that of Henri Désiré Landru, the "modern-day Bluebeard", 18 years earlier. One of Weidmann's lawyers, Vincent de Moro-Giafferi, had also defended Landru. Also present was the French novelist Colette, who was engaged by Paris-Soir to write an essay on Weidmann.

Weidmann and Million received death sentences, Blanc was sentenced to twenty months in prison, and Tricot was acquitted. Million's sentence was later commuted to life imprisonment.

== Execution ==
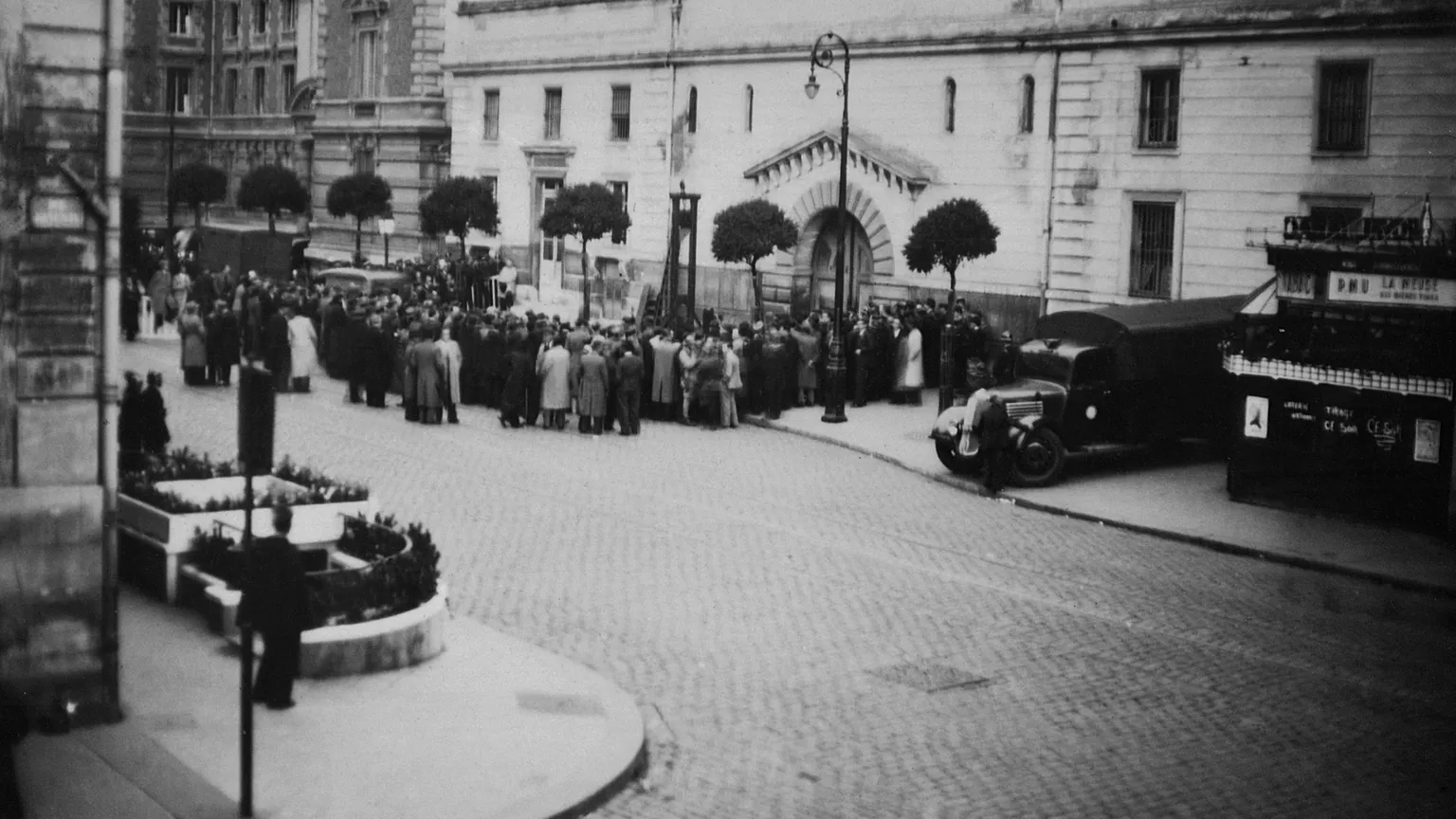
The public execution of Weidmann by guillotine

On 17 June 1939, Weidmann was beheaded by chief executioner Jules-Henri Desfourneaux outside the Saint-Pierre Prison in Versailles. The "hysterical behaviour" by spectators was so scandalous that French President Albert Lebrun immediately banned all future public executions. Executions by guillotine continued to be conducted out of public view; the last such execution was that of murderer Hamida Djandoubi on 10 September 1977.

=== Notable witnesses ===
Future horror film star Christopher Lee, then aged 17, was present for the entire duration of this event.

The experience affected Lee deeply, who recounted that he was "profoundly disturbed" by the grisly behavior of the crowd and the gory nature of execution by guillotine. In interviews and written works, his recollections reveal numerous insightful details of the event from a bystander's perspective.

==== Lee's account ====
Early on the morning of 17 June 1939, a friend awoke Lee and "dragged him" to Versailles, claiming to have something to show him.

We arrived to an open square, steadily filling with people. Dawn broke on the scene, and I realized the focus of the amassed crowd was on Madame Guillotine.

Lee recounts that, within 30 seconds of Weidmann being brought out:

He was whisked off his feet, bound, punched in the gut, placed on the monstrous contraption, and adjusted into position. The blade fell, and I failed to look away. I was sick to my soul.

Nearly half a century after that June morning, Lee portrayed headsman Charles-Henri Sanson in La Révolution française, a 1989 French TV drama about the French Revolution, in which his character made frequent use of the guillotine.

== See also ==
- List of French serial killers

== Books ==
- Jean Genet (2009) [1943]. Notre Dame des Fleurs [Our Lady of the Flowers] (in French). Originally published: L'Arbalète, 1943. Faber & Faber. ISBN 0-571-25115-3.
- F. Tennyson Jesse (1948). "Eugen Weidmann: A Study in Brouhaha". Comments On Cain. Collier Books. pp. 99–158. There is a drawing of Weidmann as the frontispiece of the book.
- Fallon, Tom (1956). "Death On A Quiet Boulevard". Craftsmen In Crime. London: Frederick Muller, Ltd.
- Michel Ferracci-Porri (2008). Beaux Ténèbres – La Pulsion du Mal d'Eugène Weidmann [Beautiful Darkness – The Impulse to Evil of Eugen Weidmann] (in French). France: Editions Normant.
- Braude, Mark (2026). The Typewriter and the Guillotine. Grand Central Publishing. ISBN 978-1538767115.
