= Anatole Deibler =

French executioner

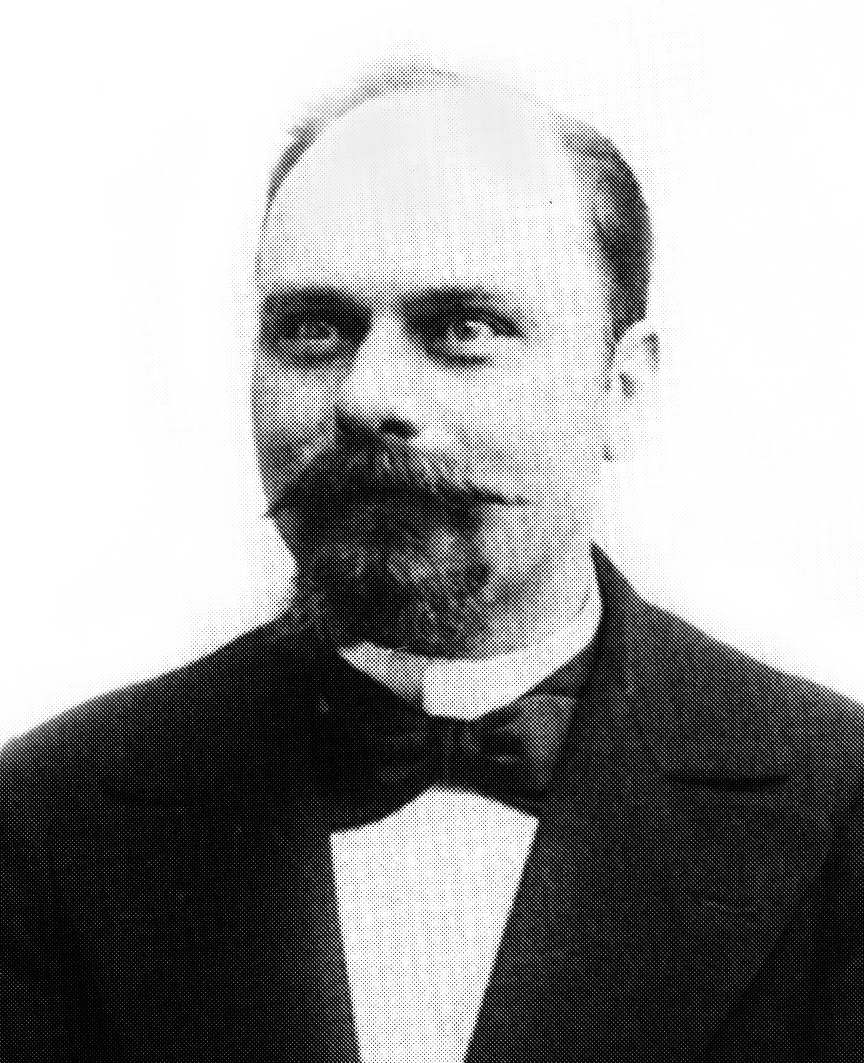
- Anatole Deibler, pictured in July 1900
- Born: Anatole François Joseph Deibler; 29 November 1863; Rennes, Ille-et-Vilaine, France
- Died: 2 February 1939 (aged 75); Paris, France
- Occupation: Executioner
- Years active: 1885–1939
- Spouse: Rosalie Rogis (m. 1898)
- Children: 2

Anatole François Joseph Deibler (29 November 1863 – 2 February 1939) was a French executioner who served as the 4th Monsieur de Paris from 1899 until his death in 1939. During his 54-year career, he participated in the execution of 395 criminals.

He is considered one of the most famous executioners in French history due to the fact that most of his executions, and the cases tied to them, were of great public interest on account of widespread reporting by media. The advent of the camera made him somewhat of a celebrity.

== Family ==
Deibler was born to Zoé Rasseneux and Louis-Antoine-Stanislas Deibler. Zoé's father Antoine-François-Joseph Rasseneux was an executioner in French Algeria since 1855. Louis worked as an executioner since 1863, having trained under his father-in-law, and was named the chief executioner ("exécuteur en chef des arrêts criminels"), an office supervising all regional executions in France, in 1879. Anatole's paternal grandfather, Joseph-Antoine Deibler, had previously held the same office during the French Third Republic. His ancestors Hans and Michael Deibler were executioners in Augsburg in the 16th and 17th centuries.

On 5 April 1898, he married Rosalie Rogis, also of a prominent executioner family. Through her, he is the uncle of André Obrecht, the penultimate executioner of France, whom he mentored and developed a father-son like relationship with the orphaned boy, following the death of Deibler's similar-aged firstborn son, Roger Aristide Hector Deibler, in infancy. He would also later take on two of Rosalie's brothers, Louis and Eugène-Clovis Rogis, as executioner's assistants.

== Career ==
Before taking up the family profession, Deibler was employed as a clothes vendor during his teenage years since age 12. In his younger years, Deibler reportedly had no ambition to continue the generational tradition. His father took him to the job for the first time on 31 March 1882, when he let him watch the preparation and enforcement of the execution of 33-year-old Pierre Lantz in Versailles, for the murder of his father Jacques.

=== Assistant executioner ===
After serving mandatory military duty from 1882 to September 1885, Deibler began training as an executioner's assistant with his maternal grandfather Antoine. Starting with the execution of Francisco Arcano on 7 or 8 September 1885 in Algiers, Deibler would participate in a total of 18 executions in Algeria as assistant until his grandfather's death in autumn of 1890.

On 1 November that same year, his father Louis named him an assistant executioner second class and had him assist directly during an execution for the first time, that of Michel Eyraud, one of the murderers in the highly publicised Gouffé case, on 3 January 1891 in Paris. His last execution as executioner's assistant was that of serial killer Joseph Vacher on 31 December 1898 in Bourg-en-Bresse.

=== Lead executioner ===
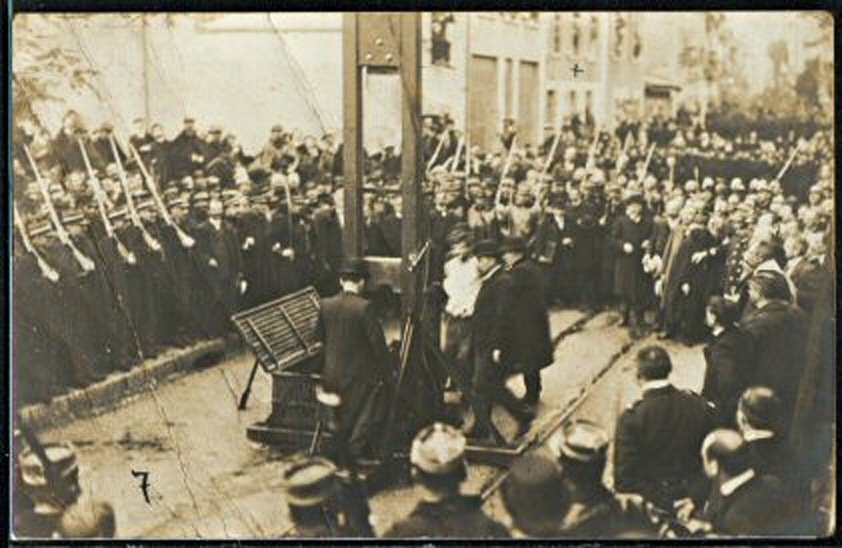
Deibler and his assistants carry out the execution of Octave-Louis David, 36, a member of a criminal gang known as the Chauffeurs de la Drome, Valence, Drôme, 22 September 1909

When Louis vacated the office on 2 January 1899, Deibler became his successor, being sworn in the same day by the French government. Louis, who was unaware of this until the ceremony, congratulated his son, saying "My son, what a nice New Year's gift!". Just two weeks later on 14 January, he performed his very first direct execution in Troyes, beheading 65-year-old Pierre-François Damoiseau, disgraced mayor of Rouilly-Saint-Loup, for the murder of his son-in-law Emile Cordier, as well as the attempted murder of his daughter Valentine, his grandson Henri, and his co-father-in-law Nicolas Cordier. Although the press initially received him well as a fitting replacement for his father and wrote enthusiastically about his upcoming first execution, following Damoiseau's execution, Jean Lorrain, then a contributor to Le Journal, criticised the speediness of the procedure, stating that it "took away the celebratory spirit, the raison d'être of the execution".

After the death of president Félix Faure on 16 February, Deibler served under newly elected president Émile Loubet, a moderate skeptic of the death penalty, which contributed to the fact that during Loubet's seven-year tenure, only thirteen executions were headed, compared to a previous annual average of between ten and twenty. In 1906, next president, Armand Fallières, put a hold on executions altogether, commuting all pending death sentences to life sentences by the end of 1908. During this time, Deibler worked as a Champagne salesman, under the alias "François Rogis", from one of his middle names and his wife's maiden name. In his leisure, he stayed at home with his wife to raise their daughter Marcelle. Despite Fallières' efforts, the assembly, backed by public opinion protesting the pardon of child murderer and rapist Albert Soleilland, refused to abolish capital punishment during a vote in 1909. On 11 January, Deibler performed the first execution in three years, beheading the four leaders of the Pollet Gang in Béthune in a quadruple execution. Another such execution would have almost occurred on 13 April 1913, when four members of the Bonnot Gang, those being Raymond Callemin, Étienne Monier, André Soudy, and Eugène Dieudonné, were put to death in Paris, but Dieudonné had his sentence commuted to hard labour, later escaping the prisoner camp in Cayenne, French Guiana, after which he secured a complete pardon through legal action.

During World War I, Deibler travelled to the active war zone in Veurne, Belgium, to execute Émile Ferfaille, who murdered his 20-year-old pregnant girlfriend Rachel Ryckewaert in midst of the Battle of Passchendaele. The beheading took place during periodic bombardment by German forces. Afterwards, Deibler was relieved of his duties as executioner and instead placed in the position of secretary to the Ministry of the Armed Forces in August 1918, though with authorization of absence in the event of an execution. After the war, Deibler would be reinstated, now executing an all-time modern high of around 20 criminals per year, largely due to general lawlessness in post-war France and the escape of several convicts in prisons near or in former war zones around the French border.

During his 40 years as lead executioner, he was responsible for 299 beheadings. His most famous execution was that of Pavel Timofeyevich Gorguloff, assassin of 14th French president Paul Doumer in 1932. Other well-known cases were that of serial killer Henri Désiré Landru in 1922, mass murderer Jules-Alexandre Ughetto in 1930, and double murderer Georges-Alexandre Sarret in 1934.

On 5 November 1936, Deibler refused to go through with the execution of Josephine Mory, convicted of killing her daughter-in-law Yvette Godefry, telling the Ministry of Justice that he would sooner retire than execute a woman as "[his] conscience forbids it". The last woman executed in France until this point, Georgette Thomas, who murdered her mother Marie Lebon, was beheaded in 1887 by Deibler's father, who regretted the execution for the rest of his life and made his son promise to never execute a woman. Deibler's position made him the legal owner of the guillotine, so due to the ultimatum, Mory's sentence was commuted to life imprisonment.

In the early 20th century, Deibler was deemed the "most hated man in France". There was more prejudice against him than American or English executioners because of a superstition that a French headsman had an evil eye that brought death or disaster to whoever caught glimpse. Deibler was in danger of being mobbed wherever he went and would often conceal his identity. At the time, his annual salary was around 6,000 francs ($1,200 in 1907 and $36,000 in 2022) while an additional 8,000 francs was paid for upkeep of the guillotine and 10 francs were paid for every day the guillotine was in operation. It is estimated Deibler's net annual income was around 30,000 francs ($6,000 in 1907 and $180,000 in 2022). His final execution was that of 28-year-old Abdelkader Rakida, already convicted of murder in Algeria, on 24 January 1939 in Lyon, for violating a city ban and using a firearm to injure two policemen during his arrest. This beheading was nearly botched as Rakida forced his body to the right despite executioners attempting to put him in a prone position, due to which the guillotine ended up partially slicing through the mandible while decapitating him, which initially went unnoticed due to nighttime.

== Death ==
Deibler collapsed from a heart attack at Porte de Saint-Cloud metro station in the 16th arrondissement of Paris while on his way to Jacques-Cartier Departemental Prison in Rennes, where he would have performed his 300th execution the next day. He died shortly after arrival at a hospital. The condemned man, career criminal Maurice Pilorge, who was sentenced for murdering his 25-year-old accomplice and lover Néstor Escudero, was given a stay of execution, but was executed two days later by one of Deibler's students, his nephew by marriage Jules-Henri Desfourneaux, who was named new chief executioner. Deibler is buried in the western cemetery of Boulogne-Billancourt.

== Notes and references ==
Government offices
| Preceded by Louis-Antoine-Stanislas Deibler | Chief Executioner of the French Republic; 1899 – 1939 | Succeeded by Jules-Henri Desfourneaux |
