= Mildred Keith =

Children's novel series by Martha Finley

Mildred Keith is a children's novel series written by Martha Finley (1828-1909) between 1876 and 1894. The story ties in with Finley's popular Elsie Dinsmore series, Mildred being a second-cousin of Elsie. Of these two girls' fiction series, the Mildred books were more realistic and autobiographical in nature, compared to the more idealistic Elsie Dinsmore series. The series was reissued 2001-2003 as Millie Keith: A Life of Faith, an adaption for modern readers by Kersten Hamilton.

The story is set in the United States of America between the 1830s and 1860s. Mildred is the eldest child of Stuart and Marcia Keith (née Stanhope), and has several younger siblings: Rupert, Zillah, Ada, Eva (who died at age five, before the first book begins), Cyril, Don, Fan and Annis. She is in her teens when the series opens, and by the end her own children are in their teens and twenties. It was one of a series of late 19th century books including Little Women, Elsie Dinsmore, and the Chautauqua Girls that promoted more traditional behavior for young women, focusing on how to be "Christian citizens and mothers, contributing to their communities through philanthropy and social reform."

== Plot ==
Mildred Keith is the oldest child in the Keith family, who move from Lansdale, Ohio to the frontier town of Pleasant Plains, Indiana. The family faces various challenges settling into their new home, including an exceptionally bad malaria season. Mildred does not contract malaria, but wears herself out nursing her family. In hopes of improving her health, she goes to spend a year with her relatives, the Dinsmore family, on their Southern plantation, Roselands. During this time she accompanies her uncle, Arthur Dinsmore, Sr. on a trip to Viamede plantation to bring his little granddaughter Elsie to live at Roselands. Mildred also meets and falls in love with Charlie Landreth, but rejects his proposal of marriage on the grounds that as a Christian she cannot marry someone who is an unbeliever. She returns to the North, but continues to correspond with Mr. Landreth for a time and remains hopeful that he will someday become a Christian and they will be able to marry.

Back in Pleasant Plains, Mildred puts all her heart into serving her family and neighbors. She receives the gift of a piano, and begins giving lessons to many local young ladies, partly as a source of income. Mildred's sister Zillah marries Wallace Ormsby, a young man whom their father has taken as a partner in his law firm, and who previously wanted to marry Mildred herself. The Keiths receive a visit from Elsie Dinsmore and her father, recently reunited. After years of waiting and hoping, but hearing nothing of her love, Mildred is rewarded when Charlie Landreth arrives unexpectedly. He has become a Christian, and so they marry immediately. Charlie quickly becomes a much loved member of the family, and, as a doctor, of the whole community.

Before long Mildred and Charlie welcome their first child, a son named Percy. While he is in his infancy, the Landreths, along with Mildred's sister Annis, travel south to spend a delightful winter with Elsie and her family, which now includes her stepmother, Rose, and baby brother, Horace, Jr. A considerable amount of this part of the story focuses on Elsie alone, with no connection to Mildred.

In the following years the Landreth family grows to include Marcia, Stuart and Fan. Zillah and Wallace also have children: Stuart and Ada. Fan Keith dies after a brief illness. Ada Keith marries Frank Osborne and they go to China as missionaries. Cyril goes to college and then marries Lucy. Rupert and Don travel to California to look for gold, and also to give them both a much needed change of scene. On their journey, Rupert is captured by Indians and presumed dead, but three years later he arrives home, along with his young wife, Juanita, a Spanish Mexican who was also held captive by the Indians. Don also returns, having found a small quantity of gold. He marries Flora Weston, a relative of Charlie's who had come to live with the Landreths for a time for the sake of her health.

The Keith clan support abolition, and Mildred and Charlie provide a home and work for a family of runaway slaves. However, the family are recaptured by their owner and taken back to a life of slavery. When the Civil War breaks out all the Keiths do whatever they can to support the cause of the Union. Rupert, Wallace, Cyril and Don enlist in the army, but Charlie is persuaded to stay home, since as a doctor he is indispensable to the community. Before the war is over, Percy Landreth and Stuart Ormsby also go to fight. All members of the family return alive, though some are in broken health and have terrible experiences to recount.

The final book has been criticised for not being about Mildred at all. It follows the story of four orphaned siblings, Ethel, Blanche, Harry and Nannette Eldon, who are sent to live with a cruel curate before being taken in by their kind uncles. Ethel is determined to support herself and her siblings so that they can live together in their own home and not be beholden to anyone. She works extremely hard and is successful in starting her own business and putting a roof over the heads of her beloved brother and sisters. Nanette dies of an illness in the flower of her girlhood, and is much missed by her family. Through their friendship with the family of Don Keith, Ethel and Blanche meet Percy Landreth and Stuart Ormsby on their return from the war. There is a mutual attraction and the two sisters become brides of the cousins, Ethel becoming Mildred's daughter-in-law.

== List of original Mildred Keith books ==
The books, in order of publication, are:

1. Mildred Keith (1876)
2. Mildred at Roselands (1880)
3. Mildred and Elsie (1881)
4. Mildred's Married life, and a winter with Elsie Dinsmore (1882)
5. Mildred at Home: with something about her relatives and friends (1884)
6. Mildred's Boys and Girls (1886)
7. Mildred's New Daughter (1894)

== List of revised A Life of Faith books ==
The original plot is approximately followed for the first few of the adapted books, but the final two in particular have completely new story lines. The revised books were also marketed along with a Millie Keith doll.

1. Millie's Unsettled Season
2. Millie's Courageous Days
3. Millie's Remarkable Journey
4. Millie's Faithful Heart
5. Millie's Steadfast Love
6. Millie's Grand Adventure
7. Millie's Reluctant Sacrifice
8. Millie's Fiery Trial
