= The Typewriter and the Guillotine =

2026 book

The Typewriter and the Guillotine: An American Journalist, a German Serial Killer, and Paris on the Eve of WWII
- Author: Mark Braude
- Language: English
- Publisher: Grand Central Publishing
- Publication date: January 20, 2026
- Pages: 432
- ISBN: 978-1538767115

The Typewriter and the Guillotine: An American Journalist, a German Serial Killer, and Paris on the Eve of WWII is a 2026 historical non-fiction book by Mark Braude.

== Summary ==
The book revolves around Janet Flanner, an American narrative journalist who served as The New Yorker's Paris correspondent over the course of the 1920s and 1930s. In particular, the books covers Flanner's reporting on the case of Eugen Weidmann, a German serial killer active in France in the late 1930s, as the spectre of war with Nazi Germany grew larger and larger.

== Critical reception ==
Michael O’Donnell of The Wall Street Journal praised the book as "absorbing, expertly paced," saying that Braude "writes in the tradition of Erik Larson, who has published multiple bestsellers that set interpersonal dramas and true-crime accounts against the backdrop of great world events."

Kirkus Reviews gave the book a generally positive review, saying that it "presents something rare: a novel story about interwar Paris," while noting that Weidmann "appears in less vivid detail, suggesting an imbalance in source material." Glynnis MacNicol of The New York Times described the book as a "long overdue and highly enjoyable biography" of Flanner, while also criticising the Weidmann case as out of place, saying that Flanner's "work on the case was hardly career-defining, or even genre-defining." Chris Hewitt of The Minnesota Star Tribune echoed the sentiment, saying that "the connection feels tenuous... As a reader, it would be easy enough to skip right past [the Weidmann chapters] and get to the good stuff about fascinating Flanner."
