= Pollet =

Pollet is a surname. People named Pollet include:

- Abel Pollet (1873–1909), French gangster and murderer
- David Pollet (born 1988), Belgian footballer
- Eugène Pollet (1886–?), French gymnast
- Francis Pollet (born 1964) French general officer
- Gerry Pollet (born 1958), American lawyer and politician
- Howie Pollet (1921–1974), American baseball player
- Jacques Pollet (1922–1997), French automobile racer
- Jean-Daniel Pollet (1936–2004), French film director and screenwriter
- Joseph Pollet (1897–1979), American painter
- Lisette Pollet (born 1968), French politician
- Ludovic Pollet (born 1970), French former footballer and current coach
- Marianne Ehrenström (1773–1867), née Pollet, Swedish artist
- Marie Nicole Simonin Pollet (1787-1864), French harpist and composer
