= Martha Finley =

American novelist

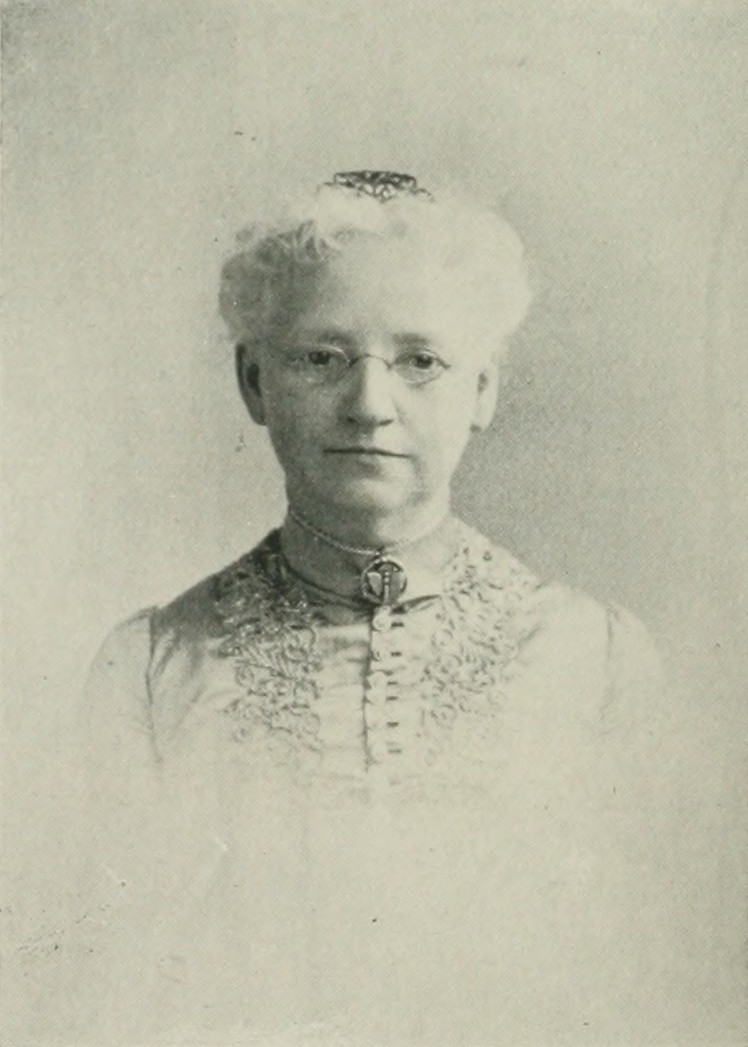
- "A Woman of the Century"
- Born: April 26, 1828; Chillicothe, Ohio, U.S.
- Died: January 30, 1909 (aged 80); Elkton, Maryland, U.S.
- Occupations: Teacher, author
- Relatives: Samuel Finley
- Writing career
- Pen name: Martha Farquharson
- Language: English
- Notable works: Elsie Dinsmore series; Mildred Keith series

Martha Finley (pen name: Martha Farquharson; April 26, 1828 – January 30, 1909) was an American teacher and author of numerous works for children, the best known being the 28-volume Elsie Dinsmore series which was published over a span of 38 years. Her books tend to be sentimental, with a strong emphasis on religious belief. The daughter of Presbyterian minister Dr. James Brown Finley and his wife and cousin Maria Theresa Brown Finley, she was born on April 26, 1828, in Chillicothe, Ohio. She died in 1909 in Elkton, Maryland.

== Early years ==
Martha Finley was born on April 26, 1828, in Chillicothe, Ohio. Her father. Dr. James B Finley, was the oldest son of General Samuel Finley, a Revolutionary officer, major in the Virginia line of cavalry, afterward general of militia in Ohio, and of Mary Brown, daughter of one of Pennsylvania's early legislators. Her maternal grandmother was the daughter of Thomas Butler, who was a great-grandson of that Duke of Ormond who was influential in making the treaty of Utrecht. The Finleys and Browns were of Scotch-Irish descent and had martyr blood in their ancestry. The name of their clan was Farquarharson, the Gaelic of Finley, and for many years Miss Finley used that name as her pen-name.

The Butlers were military men. Five of Miss Finley's great-uncles of that name were in the war of the Revolution, two of them on George Washington's staff. One of her great-uncles, Dr. Samuel Finley, was one of the early presidents of Princeton College. Her grandfathers, both on her father's and mother's side, were wealthy. Her grandfather Finley received large tracts of land from the Government in acknowledgment of his services to his country during the Revolution. He laid out and owned the town of Newville, Pennsylvania. Some of his land was in Ohio, and he finally removed to that State.

Finley attended private schools in South Bend, Indiana.

== Career ==
In the winter of 1853, Finley began her literary career by writing a newspaper story and a little book published by the Baptist Board of Publication. Many of her early works were short stories contributed to the children's sections of Sunday-school papers. Originally written anonymously, the stories’ success led her publishers to ask her to include her name. At the time her family objected to her the publishing under her own name, so she chose "Martha Farquharson" as her pen name.

Between 1856 and 1870, she wrote more than twenty Sunday school books and several series of juveniles, one series containing twelve books. These were followed by Casella (Philadelphia, 1869), Peddler of LaGrave, Old Fashioned Boy (Philadelphia, 1871), and Our Fred (New York City, 1874). It is through her "Elsie" and "Mildred" series that she became popular as a writer for the young. Finley did not write exclusively for the young. She wrote three novels, Wanted—A Pedigree (Philadelphia, 1879), Signing the Contract (New York, 1879), and Thorn in the Nest (New York. 1886).

== Personal life ==
Finley resided in Elkton, Cecil County, Maryland, in a cottage which she built. On March 3, 1892, she became a member of the Singerly Fire Company, the town's fire department, when she was issued stock certificate 33, which granted her full privileges of membership.

There is no evidence to indicate other types of participation in the organization, as most likely Singerly generously benefited from financial contributions from the civic-minded, progressive writer, yet she was the only woman listed on the rolls of the Elkton fire department until the mid-1970s

== List of publications ==
- Ella Clinton; or, By Their Fruits Ye Shall Know Them, Presbyterian Publications Board, 1856 – online at Project Gutenberg
- Aunt Ruth, Philadelphia, 1857
- Marion Harvie, Presbyterian Publications Board, 1857
- Annandale: A story of the times of the Covenanters, Presbyterian Publications Board, 1858
- Lame Letty, Philadelphia, 1859
- Try: Better Do It, Than Wish It Done, Presbyterian Publications Board, 1863
- Little Joe Carter, The Cripple, Presbyterian Publications Board, 1864
- Mysie's Work, Presbyterian Publications Board, 1864
- Willie Elton, The Little Boy Who Loved Jesus, Philadelphia, 1864
- Black Steve; or The Strange Warning, Presbyterian Publications Board, 1865
- Brookside Farm-House, Presbyterian Publications Board, 1865
- Hugo and Franz, Philadelphia, 1865
- Robert and Daisy, Philadelphia, 1865
- Allan's Fault, Presbyterian Publications Board, 1866
- Anna Hand, the Meddlesome Girl, Philadelphia, 1868
- Casella, Dodd, 1868
- Grandma Foster's Sunbeam, Philadelphia, 1868
- Little Dick Positive, Philadelphia, 1868
- The Little Helper, 1868
- Little Patience, Philadelphia, 1868
- Loitering Linus, Philadelphia, 1868
- Maude's Two Homes, Philadelphia, 1868
- Millie, or The Little Girl Who Tried To Help Others and Do Them Good, Philadelphia, 1868
- Stupid Sally, the Poor-House Girl, Philadelphia, 1868
- Amy and Her Kitten, Philadelphia, 1870
- Betty Page, Philadelphia, 1870
- The Broken Basket, Philadelphia, 1870
- Jamie by the Lake, Philadelphia, 1870
- Rufus the Unready, Philadelphia, 1870
- The White Dress, Philadelphia, 1870
- An Old-Fashioned Boy, Evans, 1871
- Lilian; or, Did She Do It Right?, Evans, 1871
- Wanted—A Pedigree, Dodd, 1871
- Contented Jim, Philadelphia, 1872
- Honest Jim, Presbyterian Publications Board, 1872
- How He Did It, Presbyterian Publications Board, 1872
- Noll in the Country, Presbyterian Publications Board, 1872
- The Twin Babies, Presbyterian Publications Board, 1872
- Our Fred, Donohue, 1874
- The Peddler of La Grave, Presbyterian Publications Board, 1875
- Aunt Hetty's Fowls, Presbyterian Publications Board, 1876
- Harry and His Chickens, Presbyterian Publications Board, 1876
- Harry and His Cousins, Presbyterian Publications Board, 1876
- Harry At Aunt Jane's, Presbyterian Publications Board, 1876
- Harry's Christmas in the City, Presbyterian Publications Board, 1876
- Harry's Fourth of July, Presbyterian Publications Board, 1876
- Harry's Grandma, Presbyterian Publications Board, 1876
- Harry's Little Sister, Presbyterian Publications Board, 1876
- Harry's Ride With Papa, Presbyterian Publications Board, 1876
- Harry's Walk With Grandma, Presbyterian Publications Board, 1876
- The Pewit's Nest, Presbyterian Publications Board, 1876
- Rosa and Robbie, Presbyterian Publications Board, 1876
- Signing the Contract, Dodd, 1879 – online at Project Gutenberg
- The Thorn in the Nest, Dodd, 1886 – online at Project Gutenberg
- The Tragedy of Wild River Valley, Dodd, 1893 – online at Project Gutenberg
- Twiddledetwit, A Fairytale, Dodd, 1898

=== Elsie Dinsmore series ===
1. Elsie Dinsmore (1867) – online at Project Gutenberg
2. Elsie's Holidays at Roselands (1868) – online at Project Gutenberg
3. Elsie's Girlhood (1872) – online at Project Gutenberg
4. Elsie's Womanhood (1875) – online at Project Gutenberg
5. Elsie's Motherhood (1876) – online at Project Gutenberg
6. Elsie's Children (1877) – online at Project Gutenberg
7. Elsie's Widowhood (1880)
8. Grandmother Elsie (1882) – online at Project Gutenberg
9. Elsie's New Relations (1883) – online at Project Gutenberg
10. Elsie at Nantucket (1884) – online at Project Gutenberg
11. The Two Elsies (1885) – online at Project Gutenberg
12. Elsie's Kith and Kin (1886) – online at Project Gutenberg
13. Elsie's Friends at Woodburn (1887)
14. Christmas with Grandma Elsie (1888) – online at Project Gutenberg
15. Elsie and the Raymonds (1889)
16. Elsie Yachting with the Raymonds (1890)
17. Elsie's Vacation (1891) – online at Project Gutenberg
18. Elsie at Viamede (1892)
19. Elsie at Ion (1893)
20. Elsie at the World's Fair (1894) – online at Project Gutenberg
21. Elsie's Journey on Inland Waters (1895)
22. Elsie at Home (1897) – online at Project Gutenberg
23. Elsie on the Hudson (1898)
24. Elsie in the South (1899)
25. Elsie's Young Folks in Peace and War (1900)
26. Elsie's Winter Trip (1902)
27. Elsie and Her Loved Ones (1903)
28. Elsie and Her Namesakes (1905)

=== Mildred Keith series ===
1. Mildred Keith (1876) – online at Project Gutenberg
2. Mildred at Roselands (1880) – online at Project Gutenberg
3. Mildred and Elsie (1881)
4. Mildred's Married Life, and a Winter with Elsie Dinsmore (1882)
5. Mildred at Home: With Something about her Relatives and Friends (1884)
6. Mildred's Boys and Girls (1886)
7. Mildred's New Daughter (1894)
