= Elsie Dinsmore =

Children's book series by Martha Finley

Cover of Elsie Dinsmore. Cover of the first Elsie Dinsmore book in the series. This edition published by Grosset & Dunlap.

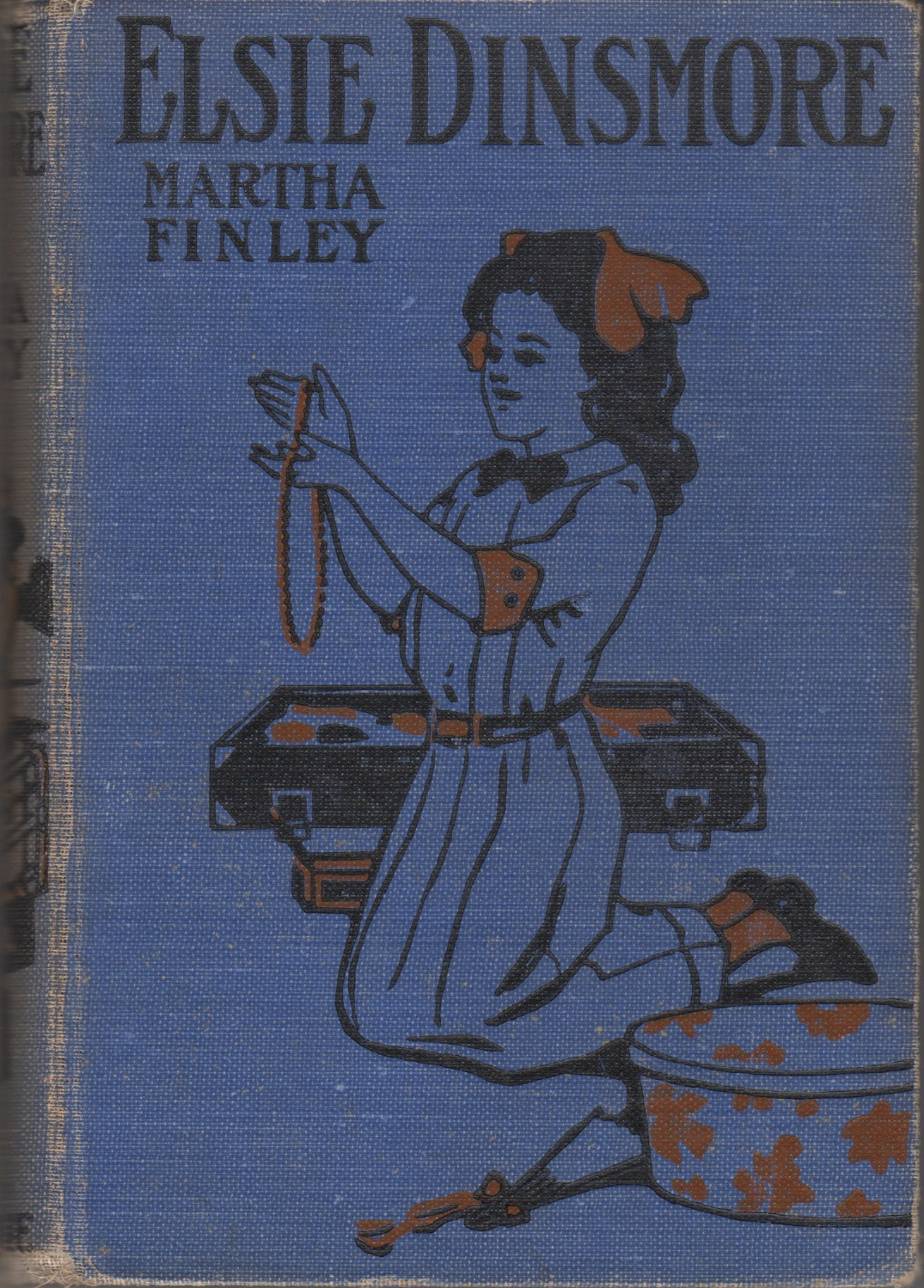
Cover of the first Elsie Dinsmore book in the series. This edition published by M.A. Donohue, Chicago.

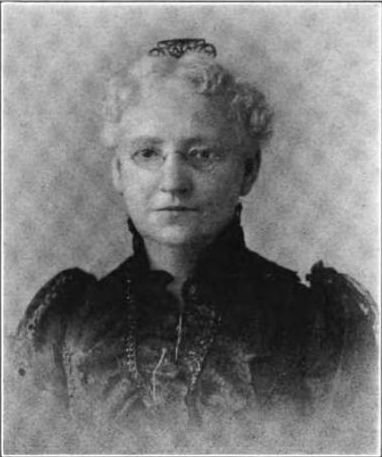
Martha Finley, author of the Elsie Dinsmore series

Elsie Dinsmore is a children's book series written by Martha Finley (1828–1909) between 1867 and 1905. Of Finley's two girls' fiction series, the "Mildred Keith" books were more realistic and autobiographical in nature, while the "Elsie Dinsmore" books, which were better sellers, were more idealistic in plot. A revised and adapted version of the Elsie books was published in 1999.

== Summary ==
The books take place on plantations in the American South, in the period before the American Civil War. Elsie is an eight-year-old girl who has been living with her paternal grandfather, his second wife (Elsie's step-grandmother), and their six children: Adelaide, Lora, Louise, Arthur, Walter, and Enna. Elsie's mother died soon after giving birth to her, and her father has been traveling in Europe. She is good friends with Rose Allison, with whom she studies the Bible. The first book begins as Elsie's father, Horace, returns from Europe and she goes to live with him. The developing story hinges on Elsie's attempts to gain her father's love while maintaining her Christian ethics and her refusal to turn in those who bully her.

== Reception ==
The first two books, published in quick succession, became immediate best sellers. The 28-book series went on to be "The most popular and longest running girl’s series of the 19th century", with the first volume selling nearly 300,000 copies in its first decade, going on to "sell more than 5 million copies in the 20th century."

The extreme piousness of the heroine and other stylized features of the books led some later critics to consider the series an example of "bad books, so transcendental in their badness that they will survive the ages."

== Adapted version ==
A new Elsie Dinsmore series of eight books was adapted and abridged from the old one and published by Zondervan/Mission City Press in 1999, dubbed "Elsie Dinsmore: A Life of Faith". The language has been modernized, so for example the African American characters no longer speak in dialect (e.g. "Da bressed chile" as opposed to "The blessed child"). While the plot-lines still hinge on Elsie's attempts to gain her father's love while maintaining her Christian ethics and refusing to report bullying (by her young uncle, Arthur, or Miss Day, the governess), some of Horace's actions have been toned down. For example, the infamous scene in which he drags Elsie off to beat her with a riding crop no longer exists. Overall he appears more as a "comically overprotective father, rather than as a sadistic tyrant."

Along with the revised books, a related line of Elsie Dinsmore dolls was sold starting in 1998, and a Bible study curriculum was produced based on the new book series. The original books have been reprinted as "Original Elsie Classics" by many publishers.

== Detailed plot ==
The first Elsie books deal with a constant moral conflict between Christian principles and familial loyalty. Horace is a strict disciplinarian who dictates inflexible rules by which his daughter must live. Any infraction is severely and often unjustly punished. In her father's absence, Elsie became a Christian and abides by Biblical law, especially the Ten Commandments - as taught to her by her dead mother's slave and then her own nanny, Chloe. Her father, being "worldly" and not a strict Christian, regards this as ludicrous and in some cases as insolence. Many conflicts result from Elsie's belief that she must obey the Word of God before that of her father and can only obey her father when his orders do not conflict with Scripture. For example, Horace attempts to force Elsie to sin by playing secular music and reading fiction on Sunday. Their conflict culminates with Elsie having a nervous breakdown as she thinks that her father does not really love her. She begs him to read the Bible with her to become a Christian but his heart is hardened.

The first two books are often discussed together as they tell one seamless story, having originally been one manuscript that was split into two by the publisher. The plot of the second book, Elsie's Holidays at Roselands, revolves around Horace's refusing to speak to Elsie — or allow anyone else to speak to her — for several months, because she is more obedient to God than to her father. Their "war of wills" culminates in Elsie coming very near to death, to the point that they shave her head hoping to abate her "brain fever". When Horace thinks that she has died, he finds her Bible, comes to a knowledge of Jesus, and converts to Christianity. Elsie comes back from the brink of death, but her recovery is slow, and due to this her father is very protective of her. Her recovery is helped by her father marrying Rose Allison. They have two more children, Horace Jr. and Rosie.

Some years later, Edward Travilla, an older man who has had his eye on Elsie for a long time, proposes to Elsie, and the next year they enjoy a quiet wedding. While the Dinsmore and Travilla families are vacationing in Europe, the Civil War begins, and they remain there until it ends. They return to find the devastation that the War has wreaked and attempt to help their families heal. They also attempt to protect themselves against the KKK. Elsie's considerable funds are used to rebuild the families' plantations and restore the families to health. The children of both the Dinsmore and Travilla families have adventures and grow in their own understanding of what it means to be a follower of Jesus Christ in an amoral world, guided by Edward and Elsie. All of the children grow up and are married except Herbert and Walter.

By the dates given in Elsie's Womanhood and Elsie's Widowhood, Elsie's birth date can be traced to about 1837. Elsie also has some more distant relatives who are recurring characters in the series, including the Keiths, the Lilburns, and the Landreths.

== Elsie and the Raymond family ==
Later in Elsie's life, the books focus less on Elsie herself, and mostly deal with her granddaughter Lulu's constant conflict with her fearful temper. When Violet is first married to Lulu's father Levis Raymond, Lulu creates a problem by refusing to obey her new mother. Another time, she hurts and nearly kills her baby sister, causing her father to punish her with a riding whip. When Lulu attends school in Louisiana (in The Two Elsies), the music instructor, Signor Foresti, hits her fingers with a whalebone pointer, causing her to strike him over the head with a book. She formally refuses any further lessons from him, defying Mr. Dinsmore's order to resume. She holds out for several months, until Foresti leaves for a new position, despite Mr. Dinsmore's strenuous efforts to make her obey. Her bad behavior causes Rosie to sympathize with her sister Vi for having such burdens, and Rosie often teases Lulu into a passion.

== Elsie's family ==
When Elsie comes of age she marries her father's good friend Edward Travilla. He has been her knight in shining armor who constantly helps her when other people are cruel to her; he has loved her for a long time. They have eight children: Elsie, Edward, Violet, Harold, Herbert, Lily (who dies at age seven), Rosie, and Walter.

Elsie Dinsmore's eldest daughter Elsie becomes engaged to her neighbor's nephew, Lester Leland. Edward Jr. goes to Europe with young Elsie when Lester Leland falls ill. While in Europe, Edward Jr. meets Zoe Love, the woman who will become his wife. He marries her just before her father dies. They later have twins: Edward Lawrence (Laurie) and Lily. While they are away, Violet meets and falls in love with Captain Levis Raymond. He has three children by his first wife: Max, Lucilla (called Lulu), and Gracie; the rest of the books are mainly about them. Together, Levis Raymond and Violet have two children: Elsie and Edward (Ned). Rosie marries William Croly, a college friend of her brother's whom she met on vacation. Lulu Raymond marries Chester Dinsmore, and they have one child together before the series ends. Max marries his step uncle's orphaned niece, Evelyn Leland.

== Places featured in the books ==
1. Roselands - A plantation owned by Elsie's grandfather. Elsie lives here during the first two books.
2. The Oaks - A plantation owned by Elsie's father. Elsie moves here with her father the year after he returns from Europe.
3. Ion - A plantation owned by Edward Travilla and his mother. Elsie moves here after she marries Edward. The majority of the books take place here.
4. Viamede - A plantation that belonged to Elsie's mother; Elsie inherits it when she turns 21.
5. Woodburn - A plantation owned by Elsie's son-in-law, Captain Levis Raymond.

The plantations are said to be set in Union, Virginia, except for Viamede, which is in Louisiana, not far from New Orleans. Other less-visited plantations include:

- Crag Cottage - Cottage belonging to Evelyn Leland.
- The Laurels - A plantation owned by Elsie's sister Rose Lacey and her husband.
- The Pines
- Ashwood - Rose Allison's father's Plantation
- The Crags (not related to Crag Cottage) - A plantation owned by Phillip and Lucy (Carrington) Ross. Elsie and her children (except Rosie and Walter, who were born later in the book) visit the Crags in Elsie's Children.
- Sunnyside - A plantation owned by Lucilla and Chester, Max and Eva.
- Magnolia Hall- Plantation owned by Molly and Louis Embury.

== Characters ==
- Elsie Dinsmore - The only child of Horace and Elsie (Grayson) Dinsmore. She marries Edward Travilla Jr., and is the mother of Elsie, Horace Edward, Violet, Harold, Herbert, Lily, Rose, and Walter Travilla.
- Horace Dinsmore - Elsie's father. He is married first to Elsie Grayson, by whom he had Elsie, then to Rose Allison, by whom he had Horace III and Rose Dinsmore.
- Edward Travilla Jr. - Son of Edward and Violet Travilla, married Elsie Dinsmore, and fathered her children. He dies in Elsie's Widowhood.
- Rose Allison Dinsmore - Second child in the Allison family, married Horace Dinsmore, mother of Horace Jr. and Rose Dinsmore.
- Enna Dinsmore Percival Johnson - Seventh child of Horace Dinsmore Senior. Married first to Richard Percival, then Mr. Johnson. She is the spoiled pet of the Dinsmore family, and she is mean to Elsie in both childhood and adulthood. She mothers four children: Richard Jr. and Molly, by Percival, and Robert 'Bob' and Elizabeth 'Betty'. She is rendered mentally unstable after a carriage accident with her father, and in the first chapter of Grandmother Elsie it is mentioned that she has died at the home of her oldest daughter.
- Arthur Dinsmore. - Fifth child of Horace Dinsmore Senior, Horace's half-brother. He is very mean to Elsie in her childhood, and is killed in the Civil War.
- Thomas Jackson alias Bromly Egerton - one of Arthur Dinsmore's friends. He tries to win Elsie's hand in marriage so he can have her inheritance. He nearly succeeds, but Horace finds out before he can convince her to run away with him. He is killed in the Civil War.
- Elsie Leland - Eldest child of Edward and Elsie Travilla. She marries Lester Leland and has four children: Edward Travilla, Eric, Elsie Alicia, and Violet Leland.
- Horace Edward Travilla - The second child of Edward and Elsie Travilla. He marries Zoe Love shortly before her father's death and they have twins: Lily (after his sister) and Edward Lawrence.
- Violet Raymond - Elsie and Edward Travilla's third child. She marries the widower Captain Levis Raymond and becomes the stepmother of Max, Lulu, and Grace. She has two children: Elsie and Edward Raymond.
- Harold Allison Travilla - The fourth child of Edward and Elsie Travilla. He eventually marries his sister's stepdaughter, Grace Raymond.
- Herbert Travilla - Edward and Elsie's fifth child. He becomes a physician and after the first books he is rarely mentioned.
- Lily Travilla - Edward and Elsie's sixth child who dies at age 7.
- Rose Travilla Croly - Edward and Elsie's seventh child. She marries her brother's friend, William Croly. She was mean to Lucilla when she was younger.
- Walter Travilla - The youngest child of Edward and Elsie, named after Walter Dinsmore.
- Lucilla "Lulu" Raymond Dinsmore - The oldest daughter of Grace and Captain Levis Raymond, and stepdaughter to Violet Raymond. She is known for having an incredibly bad temper, and as a little girl she is punished several times in each book by her father. However, she eventually overcomes her bad temper with the help of her father and becomes a very obedient daughter. She marries Chester Dinsmore. Most of the later books mainly focus on her.
- Max Raymond - Only son of Grace and Captain Levis Raymond, and stepson of Violet Raymond. He marries Evelyn Leland, his step-cousin and his sister's best friend.
- Grace Raymond Travilla - Youngest daughter of Grace and Captain Levis Raymond, and stepdaughter of Violet Raymond. She marries Harold Travilla, her physician and her stepmother's younger brother.
- Chloe (no surname given), sometimes "Aunt Chloe" or "Mammy" - Elsie's nurse since infancy. Describes herself as "only a poor old black sinner, but de good Lord Jesus, He loves me jes de same as if I was white". She is married to Uncle Joe.

== Elsie's childhood friends ==
In the first two books Elsie plays with and visits several friends and neighbors and their children. Most of them had died by the time Christmas with Grandma Elsie was written. Herbert died of a broken heart when Elsie rejected his marriage proposal.

- Herbert Carrington
- Lucy Carrington Ross
- Mary Leslie
- Flora Arnett
- Caroline (Cary) Howard
- Mildred Keith
- Sophie Allison
- Isabel Carleton
- Harold Allison

== Parody ==
O. Henry wrote a parody of the Elsie books called "Elsie in New York". In this short story, Elsie (ostensibly a different Elsie, but the similarity to Finley's Elsie is overwhelmingly obvious) is portrayed as a naive young woman who has gone to New York to work for her father's former employer. Elsie is constantly presented with opportunities for honest work and relationships on her first day in the city, but always prevented by the minions of Society and Morality, such as the police or fictional activist groups like the 'Association for the Prevention of Jobs Being Put Up on Working Girls Looking for Jobs.' When she finds her father's former boss, he is a lecherous rich playboy. There the story stops, allowing the reader to fill in the rest. The story pokes fun at Elsie Dinsmore's take on the world, where as long as one has faith, and follows the lead of those in moral authority, one will be rewarded.

== Elsie Dinsmore in popular culture ==
An early mention is Jean Webster's When Patty Went to College (1903: 102): on the complications of having invented a Lieutenant Kijé-like figure: " I see a whole series of sequels stretching away into the future It's worse than the Elsie Books!"

The Elsie series is mentioned in Emily Climbs (1925), the second book of a series by Lucy Maud Montgomery, better known for Anne of Green Gables. The eponymous heroine is told derisively to "go and read the Elsie books!"

The Elsie series is mentioned in Chapter 19 of Jo of the Chalet School (1926) the second book of a school series by Elinor Brent-Dyer. Josephine Bettany, the main character, an avid reader, lies injured in bed after a skating accident. When Jo complains that she has read everything she has, Dr. Jem offers her the Elsie books. Jo accepts them doubtfully, proclaiming that they were about an 'awfully good little girl' and there were 'dozens' of them, but is soon digging eagerly into Elsie's saga. (The books featured include Elsie Dinsmore, Elsie's Holidays at Roselands, Elsie's Girlhood, Elsie's Womanhood, Elsie's Motherhood, and Elsie's Children.) Ultimately, Josephine decides to carry on the series by writing about Elsie's children (Eddie, Harold, and Herbert).

In the film Love on the Run (1936), Clark Gable as a reporter fabricating a story tells a skeptical heiress played by Joan Crawford: "Well I know it sounds a little, well, a little Elsie Dinsmore, but it's true."

In the 1938 film Man-Proof, starring Myrna Loy and Franchot Tone, Tone's character sarcastically remarks "Elsie Dinsmore's in love", commenting on Loy's stated plan to seduce her friend's husband, with whom she'd had a previous relationship.

Approximately 25 minutes into the classic play and film The Man Who Came to Dinner (1939), Sheridan Whiteside, played by Monty Woolley, refers to his secretary Maggie as Elsie Dinsmore in the following line, said in a sarcastic tone: "Come back at eight-thirty. We'll play three-handed (cribbage) with Elsie Dinsmore."

Elsie is mentioned in Maud Hart Lovelace's book Betsy in Spite of Herself (1946). When Betsy's friend Tib buys them Sunday-evening theater tickets, Betsy remembers how Elsie Dinsmore would have handled what she considered a somewhat shocking proposal, then dismisses it--"[she] had never thought much of Elsie Dinsmore."

Approximately 80 minutes into the 1951 movie People Will Talk (in the "railroad" scene), Mrs. Praetorius breaks into tears and compares herself in her current emotional state to "a kind of idiot Elsie Dinsmore."

In the 1954 novel The Bad Seed by William March, the homicidal 8-year-old Rhoda Penmark reads Elsie Dinsmore "as though she hoped to find there an understanding of those puzzling values she saw in others--values which, though she tried her best to simulate them, were so curiously absent in herself." Approximately 31 minutes into the 1956 film adaptation (in a scene taking place one day after the mysterious drowning of her classmate), Rhoda Penmark, played by Patty McCormack, proudly announces that she will be reading her new book, Elsie Dinsmore, which she has won at Sunday School.

In Shirley Jackson's "The Sneaker Crisis", one of her essays about her home and family life, her daughter Jannie tries to help solve the mystery of her brother's missing sneakers. She cites an incident in Elsie Dinsmore as a reason she should get partial credit for their recovery.

In Eudora Welty's 1973 autobiography, One Writer's Beginnings, her mother mentions Elsie Dinsmore as a poor role model.

Elsie Dinsmore is mentioned in the children's novel The Sky is Falling (published 1989 but set in 1940) by Kit Pearson; it's the one book Norah finds to read at her new home.

In Thomas Pynchon's historical novel Against the Day (2006), the following dialogue occurs:

"Pa's dead and gone and I haven't stopped hating him. What kind of unnatural daughter's that make me? A girl is supposed to love her father." "Sure, in those Elsie Dinsmore stories or someplace. We all grew up on that stuff, and it poisoned our souls." (479-480)

In Natalie Naudus's 2024 young adult novel Gay the Pray Away, the Elsie Dinsmore novels are mentioned as literature approved by the Institute in Basic Life Principles cult for home-schoolers.

== List of the original books ==
The originally published books, in order of publication, were:

1. Elsie Dinsmore (1867) - online at Project Gutenberg (An abridged edition appeared circa 1945, "in response to complaints that the original encouraged children to disobey their parents.")
2. Elsie's Holidays at Roselands (1868) - online at Project Gutenberg
3. Elsie's Girlhood (1872) - online at Project Gutenberg and in the Baldwin Library of Historical Children's Literature
4. Elsie's Womanhood (1875) - online at Project Gutenberg
5. Elsie's Motherhood (1876) - online at Project Gutenberg
6. Elsie's Children (1877) - online at Project Gutenberg
7. Elsie's Widowhood (1880) - online at Internet Archive
8. Grandmother Elsie (1882) - online at Project Gutenberg
9. Elsie's New Relations (1883) - online at Project Gutenberg
10. Elsie at Nantucket (1884) - online at Project Gutenberg
11. The Two Elsies (1885) - online at Project Gutenberg
12. Elsie's Kith and Kin (1886) - online at Project Gutenberg
13. Elsie's Friends at Woodburn (1887) - online at Internet Archive
14. Christmas with Grandma Elsie (1888) - online at Project Gutenberg
15. Elsie and the Raymonds (1889)- online at Internet Archive
16. Elsie Yachting with the Raymonds (1890) - online at Internet Archive
17. Elsie's Vacation (1891) - online at Project Gutenberg
18. Elsie at Viamede (1892) - online at Project Gutenberg
19. Elsie at Ion (1893) - online at Internet Archive
20. Elsie at the World's Fair (1894) - online at Project Gutenberg
21. Elsie's Journey on Inland Waters (1895) - online at Internet Archive
22. Elsie at Home (1897) - online at Project Gutenberg
23. Elsie on the Hudson (1898) - online at Internet Archive
24. Elsie in the South (1899) - online at Project Gutenberg
25. Elsie's Young Folks (1900) - online at Internet Archive
26. Elsie's Winter Trip (1902) - online at Internet Archive
27. Elsie and Her Loved Ones (1903) - online at Internet Archive
28. Elsie and Her Namesakes (1905) - online at Internet Archive

== List of the "A Life of Faith" books ==
The revised series was later reissued as Elsie Dinsmore: A Life of Faith.

1. Elsie's Endless Wait
2. Elsie's Impossible Choice
3. Elsie's New Life
4. Elsie's Stolen Heart
5. Elsie's True Love
6. Elsie's Troubled Times
7. Elsie's Tender Mercies
8. Elsie's Great Hope
