= Pollet Gang =

French crime group

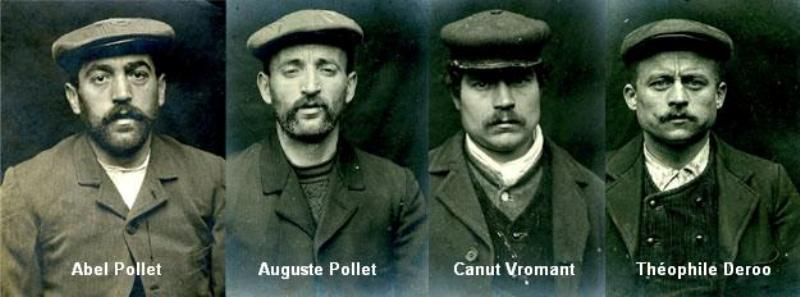
The Pollet gang

The Pollet Gang (La Bande Pollet), also known as the Bandits of Hazebrouck (Bandits d’Hazebrouck) were a French criminal group active in Nord and Pas-de-Calais, as well as Belgium from 1889 until their arrests in 1906. The group was primarily led by its founder Abel Pollet (9 October 1873 – 11 January 1909), along with his brother Auguste, Canut Vromant and Théophile Deroo. The joint execution of the four leaders for murder was the first following a three-year suspension of the death penalty in France.

== Biography ==
Abel Pollet was born in Vieux-Berquin on October 9, 1873.

He became a smuggler who put his gift for leadership to use organizing his fellow traffickers into a more lucrative and violent line of work. Thanks, presumably, to the syndicate’s pre-existing professional aptitude for evasion, it persisted for years and authored a quantity of robberies and murders that authorities could only guess at (the official homicide estimation ran north of 50). It was a spree so atrocious that it helped force the end of the death penalty moratorium, as sentiment was so strong against the Hazebrouck gang.

The murders committed in northern France by the Pollet brothers' gang, also known as the Hazebrouck's bandits, hit the headlines.

Four members of the bandits were sentenced to death on 26 June 1908 in Saint-Omer.

The Capricornian in Rockhampton reported:

FRENCH MURDER GANG

A court of justice has seldom listened to a more cold-blooded recital than that of the perpetrators of the atrocious triple murder at Violaines (Pas de Calais) in January, 1906, says the Paris correspondent of Reuter's Agency in a message of the 23rd of June. The notorious gang of Hazebrouck, comprising twenty-seven persons — fourteen men and thirteen women — are now undergoing trial at Saint Omer, being charged with no fewer than 118 crimes, many accompanied by violence and murder.
The three leading members of this organised band— Abel Pollet, his brother Auguste Pollet, and Canut Vromant— yesterday told the judge in boastful language how they did to death an aged couple named Lecoq, eighty and seventy-nine years of age respectively, and their daughter, aged fifty-five years, who were living together in the centre of the village of Violaines. The self-confessed murderers appeared to vie with each other in glorying in their remorseless brutality. They described how they broke into the house towards midnight, Abel, the chief of the gang, armed with a poker, and Vromant with a heavy iron stove-lid. (...)

Abel Pollet confessed of his own accord to participation in no fewer than 250 crimes.

== Execution ==
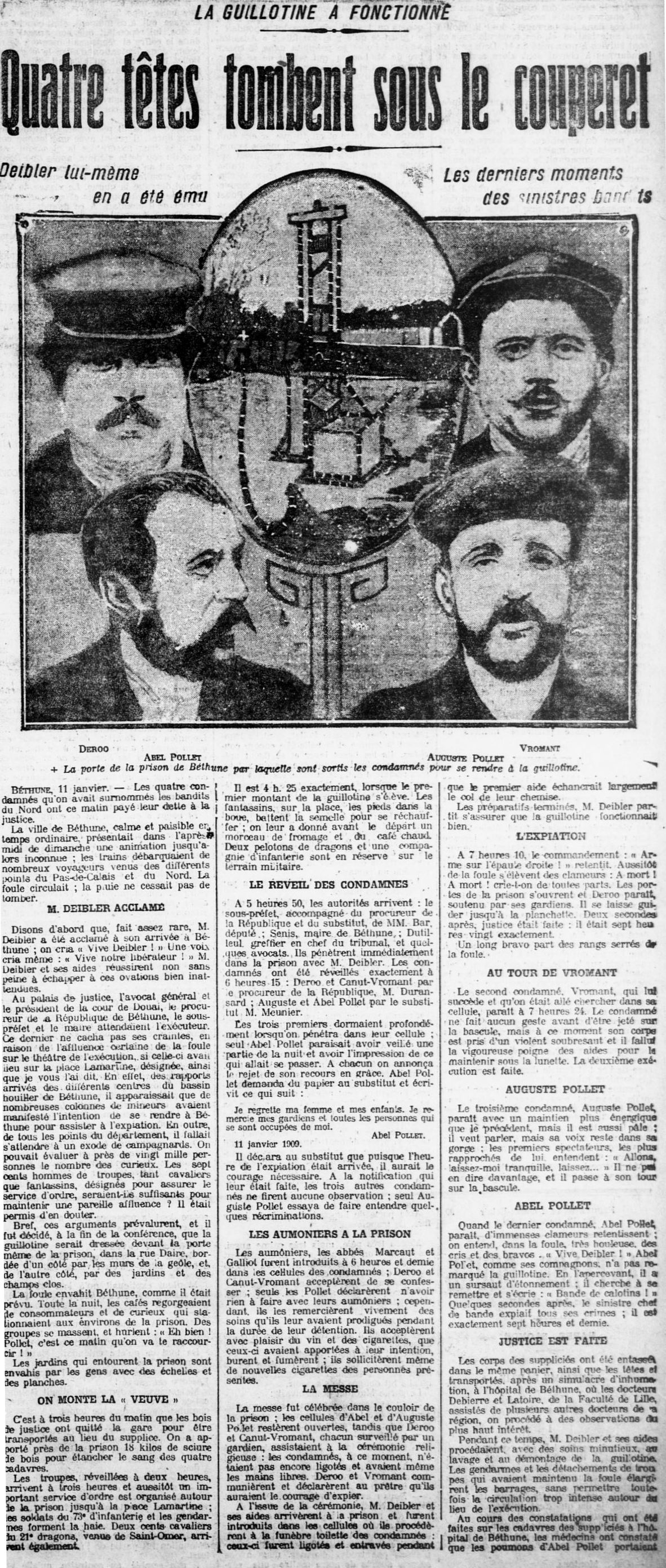
Article in L'Ouest-Eclair (Rennes) from Thursday, 12 January 1909, about the quadruple execution from Béthune the day before.

The Advertiser in Adelaide ran about the quadruple execution on February 20, 1909:

THE GUILLOTINE AT WORK

FOUR EXECUTIONS.
A telegram from Bethune, in North France, dated January 11, says:—This morning at dawn the guillotine appeared again in France, after a lapse of more than three years, and the four men whose death warrants were signed by President Fallieres on Saturday were led out to execution. It was a gloomy morning, but a crowd of some 30,000 people had assembled in the square outside the gaol where the execution took place. The law of France prescribes public executions. All night long the people had been gathering. At midnight there were 2,000 watchers in the square, and the main street of the town was crowded, as on the eve of a fete. Soon after midnight, men brought ladders and benches to the square and mounted them to obtain an uninterrupted view. Others climbed into the branches of trees, where their presence was revealed by the glow of cigarettes and pipes in the dark among the branches.
As the hours went by the crowd increased steadily. Trains bringing spectators arrived from all the large towns in the neighborhood, and even from Paris. All the hotels were crowded, and in the cafes people passed the night drinking and discussing the exploits of the four doomed men, the leaders of "the bandits of the north." At 4 o'clock in the morning Deibler, the public executioner, and his four assistants erected the guillotine on the prearranged site. The troops had trouble keeping back the crowd, who wished to examine the instrument at close quarters. Meanwhile the four victims, Abel Pollet and his three accomplices, Auguste Pollet (his brother), Canut-Vroman, and Théophile Deroo, were still ignorant of their approaching end. Each man had been found guilty of three murders. Abel Pollet had confessed of his own accord to participation in no fewer than 250 crimes, including several murders. His accomplices, to judge from their confessions, were scarcely his inferiors in crime.
At 25 minutes to 6 the Public Prosecutor entered the condemned men's cells and said, to them in the traditional formula, "I regret to have to inform you that the President of the Republic has rejected your appeal for mercy. You must prepare for the extreme penalty. Have courage." "Courage I have always had," replied Abel Pollet. He and his brother accepted the ministrations of a priest, their two comrades having previously received religious consolation. In bidding farewell to the priest who officiated Abel Pollet thanked him and begged him to take care of his wife and children. "If I had listened to my wife's advice," he said, "I should not be here now." This was the only indication of remorse that he displayed. The prison barber was then summoned, and in accordance with Deibler's instructions, shaved the prisoners' necks and ripped off their collars. Canut-Vroman asked for a cordial, but was given a large glass of brandy. On the whole, all four men maintained their courage.
At 25 minutes past 7 Deroo was led out to execution. He was dressed only in shirt and trousers, and was bareheaded. As Deroo appeared his face was livid, and he walked feebly with short steps, being shackled round the ankles. There was a painful silence, and then an outbreak of hoots and curses from the crowd. For a moment Deroo hesitated, but he was quickly hurried forward and flung face downwards on the plank of the guillotine. Deibler released the knife, there was a flash, a sudden jarring sound, and all was over. The head fell into a basket in front of the knife, while the trunk was hastily flung into another basket at the side.
All the savage instincts of the crowd appeared to be aroused. There were frantic shouts of "Death!" "Death!" mingled with curses. The officers of the troops shouted to their men to stand firm against the threatened rush. The guillotine was quickly cleaned, and Canut-Vroman was brought forward. He showed no sign of flinching. A moment later his head lay in the sawdust and the crowd was giving vent to fierce cries of exultation. Auguste Pollet came next. He fought and screamed. Last of the four came Abel Pollet, the leader of the gang. The crowd's excitement now reached its climax. The people yelled, hissed and shouted abuse. Pollet was unmoved. His last words were, "Down with the priests! Long live the Republic!" His head fell, and there was a savage rush on the part of the crowd, which seemed bent on tearing the corpse to pieces. The troops had all they could do to restrain the public frenzy. Just before leaving his cell Abel Pollet wrote a letter of thanks to the governor of the prison, his handwriting being firm and regular. The whole terrible scene was completed in eight minutes.

== See also ==
- Anatole Deibler
- Guillotine

== Sources ==
- Jacques Messiant: L'Affaire Pollet – À l'origine des Brigades du Tigre. Éditions Ouest-France, Rennes 2015. ISBN 978-2-7373-6549-2.
- Sylvain Larue: Les nouvelles affaires criminelles de France. De Borée Éditions, 2009, p. 138–146.
- Carnets d’exécutions, 1885–1939, Anatole Deibler, présentés et annotés par Gérard A. Jaeger, Éditions L’Archipel, Paris 2004.
- Matthias Blazek: Räuberbande versetzte in den Jahren nach 1900 ganz Nordfrankreich in Schockzustand – Guillotine wird nach jahrelanger Pause für Vierfachhinrichtung 1909 in Béthune aufgestellt. In: Kameradschaftliches aus Fontainebleau – Mitteilungsblatt des Freundeskreises Deutscher Militärischer Bevollmächtigter in Frankreich, nr. 43 and 44, September 2015 and April 2016, Münster (Westfalen)/Adelheidsdorf, 2015/16, p. 8 ff. and 5 ff.
- Matthias Blazek: Räuberbande versetzte in den Jahren nach 1900 ganz Nordfrankreich in Schockzustand – Guillotine wird nach jahrelanger Pause für Vierfachhinrichtung 1909 in Béthune aufgestellt. In: Journal der juristischen Zeitgeschichte (JoJZG), nr. 3/2014, de Gruyter, Berlin, 2014, p. 104 ff.
