= André Obrecht =

French executioner (1899–1985)

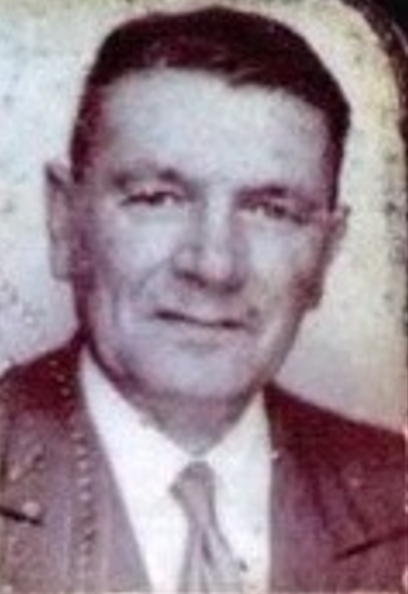
- Born: 9 August 1899; Paris, France
- Died: 30 July 1985 (aged 85); Nice, France
- Occupation: Executioner
- Years active: 1922–1976
- Spouse(s): Georgina Lezaacq (m. 1926–1941); Marcelle Labbé (m. 1950; died 1967)
- Children: 1

André Albert Obrecht (9 August 1899 – 30 July 1985) was a French executioner who served as the 6th Monsieur de Paris from 1951 until 1976. He participated in a total of 322 executions.

== Early life ==
Obrecht was born in the 16th arrondissement of Paris to Jean-Baptiste Léon Obrecht, who worked at La Samaritaine department store and Juliette Rogis, a waistcoat maker descended from a prominent executioner family. Obrecht's mother died of tuberculosis on 29 January 1900, aged 27, when her son was five months old. He was briefly cared for by neighbors, the Durieux couple. In 1903, Obrecht's widowed father later married the couple's daughter, 30-year-old Louise Durieux, subsequently giving birth to Obrecht's four younger siblings.

Through his aunt Rosalie, Obrecht was the nephew of the chief executioner Anatole Deibler. He learned of his uncle's job at ten, when a series of postcards, depicting the executions of the Chauffeurs de la Drôme, were published in September 1909. Following the death of Deibler's own son, who was born only one month after Obrecht, Deibler had a fatherlike relationship with young André, and the affection between the two men never ceased.

Obrecht left school at age 14, as his father urged him to find work rather than continue education due to their poor financial situation. He took an apprenticeship as a machine operator at a Salmson factory, later joining the French Army after turning 18. Obrecht had multiple short-lived romances during his time as a soldier. One relationship with a woman in the Alsace, resulted in the birth of his daughter, Gilaine.

Anatole Deibler began inviting his nephew to watch his executions via guillotine beginning 20 October 1921, when Deibler beheaded two 26-year-old post office robbers, François Frintz and Albert Luntz, for the murder of 42-year-old guard Spinnhirny, in Strasbourg, which inspired Obrecht to train as an executioner once he was demobilized. He also witnessed the execution of serial killer Henri Désiré Landru in Versailles on 25 February 1922.

== Career ==
=== Second assistant ===
After being discharged from military duty, Obrecht began working as a second class assistant executioner under his uncle on 4 April 1922, continuing his primary employment at the factory. The first beheading he participated in as assistant was the double execution of double murderers Émile Lœuillette and Louis Cadet on 23 May 1922. In this role, Obrecht took part in 149 executions.

In 1926, Obrecht married music teacher Georgina Lezaacq, who had previously given him singing lessons; they divorced in 1941.

=== First assistant ===
In February 1939, Anatole Deibler died of a heart attack while still in office. The successor to Deibler was not set, but certain between Deibler's nephews André Obrecht and Jules-Henri Desfourneaux, the husband of Obrecht's cousin Georgette Rogis. Ultimately, Deibler's widow Rosalie allowed Desfourneaux over Obrecht to succeed Deibler, despite her late husband's indication that he would prefer Obrecht as his successor in spite of Desfourneaux's higher rank. The reason was cited as financial obligations, as Desfourneaux had lived as a tenant of the Deiblers and amassed considerable debt, hence why their now-widowed aunt wanted him to receive a higher salary. Obrecht subsequently took Desfourneaux's former place as first assistant. The third execution in this role, that of German serial killer Eugen Weidmann on 17 June 1939, would be the last public execution in France due to excessive displays of celebration by locals. The beheading was captured on film by an audience member, showing that it took less than 10 seconds from Obrecht forcing Weidmann into the guillotine to the release of the blade by Desfourneaux.

Obrecht and Desfourneaux disliked each other. Obrecht thought his cousin too slow and badly organized. During World War II, following the invasion of France and establishment of the Vichy puppet regime, Desfourneaux collaborated with the Nazi occupation, executing accused communists and partisans without trial and for non-murder offenses. Obrecht was particularly disgusted by the renewed practice of executing women, which had not occurred in France since Georgette Thomas in 1887. In late 1943, after Desfourneaux headed the execution of five members of the French resistance, Obrecht and his colleagues and friends, Henri Sabin and the Martin brothers, quit. As the Salmson factory had closed due to the war effort, Obrecht made a living as a bookkeeper at the Courbevoie greyhound racing track, also running a business called "Esquimaux glacés" ("Iced Eskimos") that sold ice pops to cinemas in Paris. On 26 April 1945, while the liberation of France was still ongoing, Obrecht resumed his job, but his animosity towards his cousin had grown. After the execution of serial killer Marcel Petiot in 1946, the cousins bickered with increasing intensity and in 1947, after a full-blown fistfight, Obrecht decided, for the second time, to quit. In 1949, he settled in Casablanca in French Morocco with his girlfriend, variety store owner Berthe "Marcelle" Labbé, whom he married there on 14 February 1950. The couple stayed in Casablanca for 18 months.

=== Chief executioner ===
Obrecht returned to France after Desfourneaux died in October 1951, Obrecht wrote to the Ministry of Justice, proposing his candidature as chief executioner. This was agreed on, and his nomination beat out the other candidates who worked under Desfourneaux at the time of his death. He officially took office on 1 November and performed his first guillotining as chief 17 days later in Marseilles, when he executed 26-year-old Marcel Ythier for the murder of two police officers, 30-year-old Henri Amiel and 50-year-old Clément Fauchier.

Obrecht executed 63 people as chief executioner. The most executions happened in 1960, totalling 19. Two executions (Raymond Anama and Landry-Lambert Gau) took place in the overseas departement of Martinique in 1964 and 1965. Obrecht was diagnosed with Parkinson's disease in the early 1970s, but nevertheless handled four more executions.

His most notable executions include:

- Émile Buisson, crime boss, executed on 28 February 1956 in Paris for ordering no less than twenty murders
- Jacques Fesch, unemployed, executed on 1 October 1957 in Paris for the murder of 35-year-old police officer Jean Vergne during a botched robbery; Fesch has been designated a Servant of God and eligible for canonisation as a saint for his devout Catholic faith, after a bid for presidential pardon failed
- Georges Rapin, pimp, executed on 26 July 1960 in Paris for the murders of 35-year-old Roger Adam and 23-year-old Muguette "Dominique" Thirel
- Saïb Hachani, unemployed, executed on 22 March 1966 in Lyon for the murders of Mohamed Hadji, Nedjaï Ahmed and Messaoud Bouguerry; his trial was well remembered for his lawyer's defense that Hachani was being framed by Algerian political terrorists
- Günther Volz, French Foreign Legionnaire, executed on 16 December 1967 in Metz for the rape and murder of 12-year-old Solange Kintzinger
- Jean-Laurent Olivier, farmhand, executed on 11 March 1969 in Amiens for the rape and murder of 11-year-old Pierrette Demarle and 10-year-old Lucien Demarle
- Roger Bontems and Claude Buffet, prisoners, executed on 28 November 1972 for the murder of 27-year-old prison guard Guy Girardot and 35-year-old nurse Nicole Comte during an attempted prison break; Bontems had only been convicted for aiding Buffet in taking the victims hostage, but not for the murders, spurring his attorney Robert Badinter to enter politics, eventually abolishing the death penalty as Minister of Justice in 1981
- Ali Ben Yanes, farmhand, executed on 12 May 1973 in Marseilles for the murder of 7-year-old Danièle Marra during a botched robbery
- Christian Ranucci, salesman, executed on 28 July 1976 in Marseilles for the kidnapping and murder of 8-year-old Marie-Dolorès Rambla; Ranucci's beheading, marked by controversy over his guilt, was Obrecht's final execution and the third-last overall

=== Resignation ===
On 30 September 1976, Obrecht resigned his position due to worsening Parkinson's. The next day, his title was transferred to his nephew by marriage Marcel Chevalier, his assistant since 1958. Chevalier performed the final two guillotinings in France, of Jérôme Carrein in Douai and Hamida Djandoubi, both in 1977.

== Death ==
Obrecht died on 30 July 1985 at Hôpital Pasteur in Nice. Four years later, reporter Jean Ker, who interviewed him many times, released a book called Le Carnet Noir du Bourreau (The Executioners' Black Diary), a biography. Obrecht left an image of himself as a normal man albeit a womaniser, quite authoritative at work and, more than anything else, lonely because of his job.

Government offices
Preceded by Jules-Henri Desfourneaux	Chief Executioner of the French Republic; 1 November 1951 – 30 September 1976	Succeeded by Marcel Chevalier
