= Marcel Chevalier =

French executioner (1921–2008)

- Chevalier’s grave
- Born: 28 February 1921; Montrouge, Seine
- Died: 8 October 2008 (aged 87); Vendôme
- Occupation: executioner
- Years active: 1958–1981
- Title: Monsieur de Paris
- Predecessor: André Obrecht

Marcel Chevalier (28 February 1921 – 8 October 2008) was the last chief executioner (Monsieur de Paris) of France.

== Early life ==
Chevalier was born in Montrouge, Seine on 28 February 1921.

At the age of 13, Chevalier began working in printing. A talented printer, he was a recipient of the Meilleur Ouvrier de France.

== Career ==
Chevalier’s wife was the niece of chief executioner André Obrecht. Obrecht had no children of his own and chose Chevalier as his successor.

Chevalier was officially named an executioner on 1 October 1958 and became Obrecht’s assistant on 4 November of that year. Obrecht retired in 1976 and Chevalier succeeded him to the position of chief executioner. He held this position until 1981, when capital punishment was abolished under president François Mitterrand and justice minister Robert Badinter. The method of application of the death penalty for civilian capital offences in France from 1791 to 1981 was beheading with the guillotine. Military executions were by firing squad.

Chevalier performed or assisted with 42 executions after starting his career in 1958. After his appointment as chief executioner on 1 October 1976, he executed only two people. They were the last two executions in France:

- Jérôme Carrein, condemned twice for the murder and rape of an eight-year-old girl, was guillotined on 23 June 1977 in Douai.
- Hamida Djandoubi, for having tortured and strangled his former nurse, was guillotined on 10 September 1977 in Marseille.

== Retirement ==
Chevalier officially retired on October 10, 1981. Being an executioner brought him about 1,000 euros a month, and he had continued to work as a printer during his tenure as chief executioner. Chevalier returned to this career full time after retirement.

Chevalier was interviewed by the press on a number of occasions, but later, disillusioned by the sensationalist nature of press coverage, chose to say nothing of his experiences with the guillotine.

== Personal life and death ==
Chevalier married his wife Marcelle (née Obrecht) on 12 June 1948. They had two children, Dominique and Éric. Éric was present at Carrein's and Djandoubi's executions in order to prepare him for succession to chief executioner upon his father's eventual retirement.

Chevalier died on 8 October 2008 in Vendôme, Centre-Val de Loire.

Government offices
Preceded by André Obrecht	Chief Executioner of the French Republic; 1 October 1976 – 9 October 1981	Succeeded by Capital punishment abolished
