= Capital punishment in France =

Europe holds the greatest concentration of abolitionist states (blue). Map current as of 2022 Abolished for all offences Abolished in practice Retains capital punishment

Capital punishment in France (French: peine de mort en France) is banned by Article 66-1 of the Constitution of the French Republic, voted as a constitutional amendment by the Congress of the French Parliament on 19 February 2007 and simply stating "No one can be sentenced to the death penalty" (French: Nul ne peut être condamné à la peine de mort). The death penalty was already declared illegal on 9 October 1981 when President François Mitterrand signed a law prohibiting the judicial system from using it and commuting the sentences of the seven people on death row to life imprisonment. The last execution took place by guillotine, being the main legal method since the French Revolution; Hamida Djandoubi, a Tunisian citizen convicted of torture and murder on French soil, was put to death in September 1977 in Marseille.

Major French death penalty abolitionists across time have included philosopher Voltaire; poet Victor Hugo; politicians Léon Gambetta, Jean Jaurès and Aristide Briand; and writers Alphonse de Lamartine and Albert Camus.

== History ==
=== Ancien Régime ===
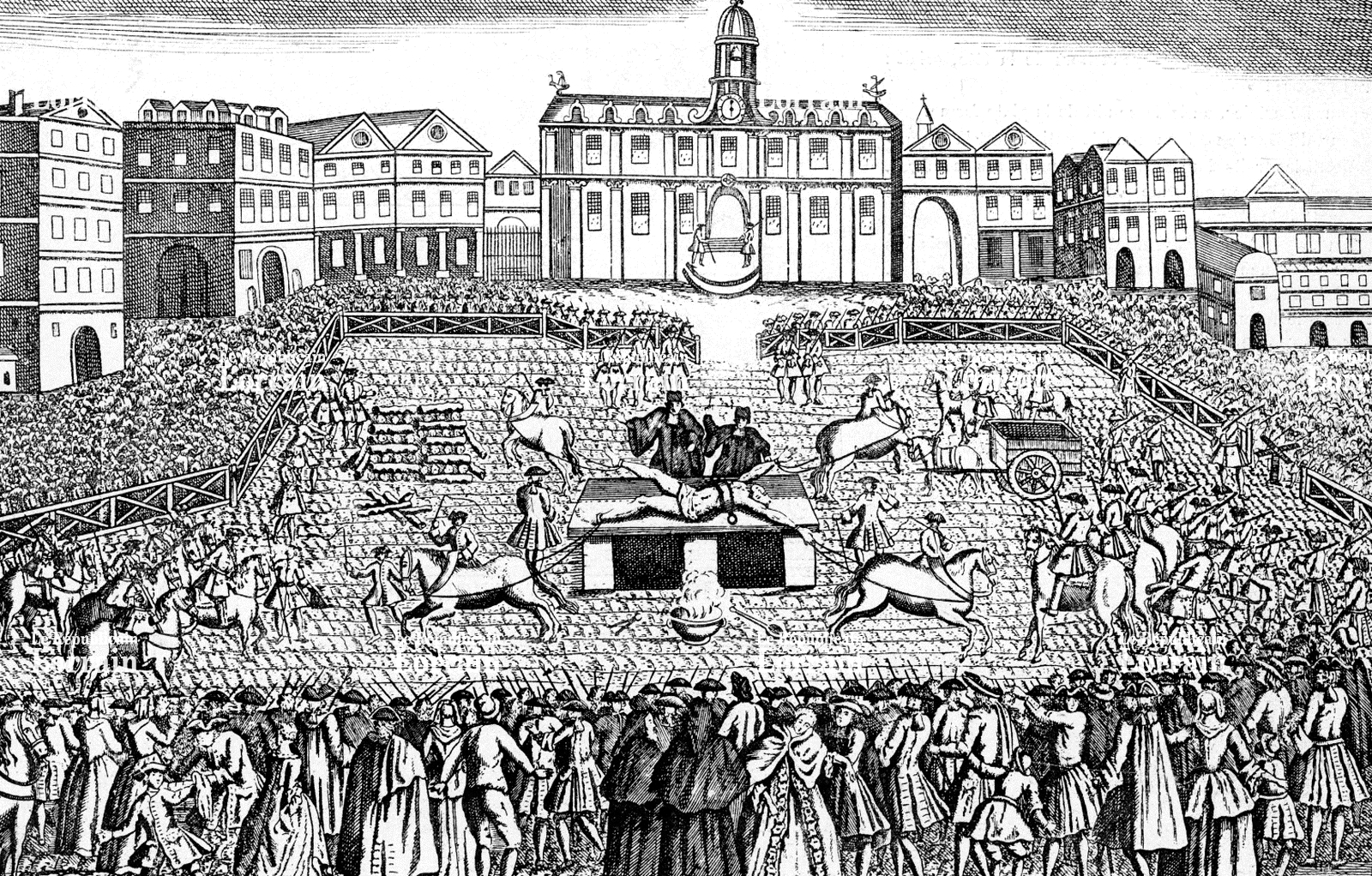
Robert-François Damiens being dismembered for his attempted murder on Louis XV.

Prior to 1791, under the Ancien Régime, there existed a variety of means of capital punishment in France, depending on the crime and the status of the condemned person:

- Hanging was the most common punishment.
- Decapitation by sword, for nobles only.
- Burning for arson, bestiality, heresy, sodomy, and witchcraft. The convict was occasionally discreetly strangled.
- Breaking wheel for brigandage and murder. The convict could be strangled before having his limbs broken or after, depending on the atrocity of his crime.
- Death by boiling for counterfeiting.
- Dismemberment for high treason, parricide, and regicide.

On 6 July 1750, Jean Diot and Bruno Lenoir were strangled and burned at the stake in Place de Grève for sodomy, the last known execution for sodomy in France. Also in 1750, Jacques Ferron was either hanged or burned at the stake in Vanvres for bestiality, the last known execution for bestiality in France.

=== Adoption of the guillotine ===
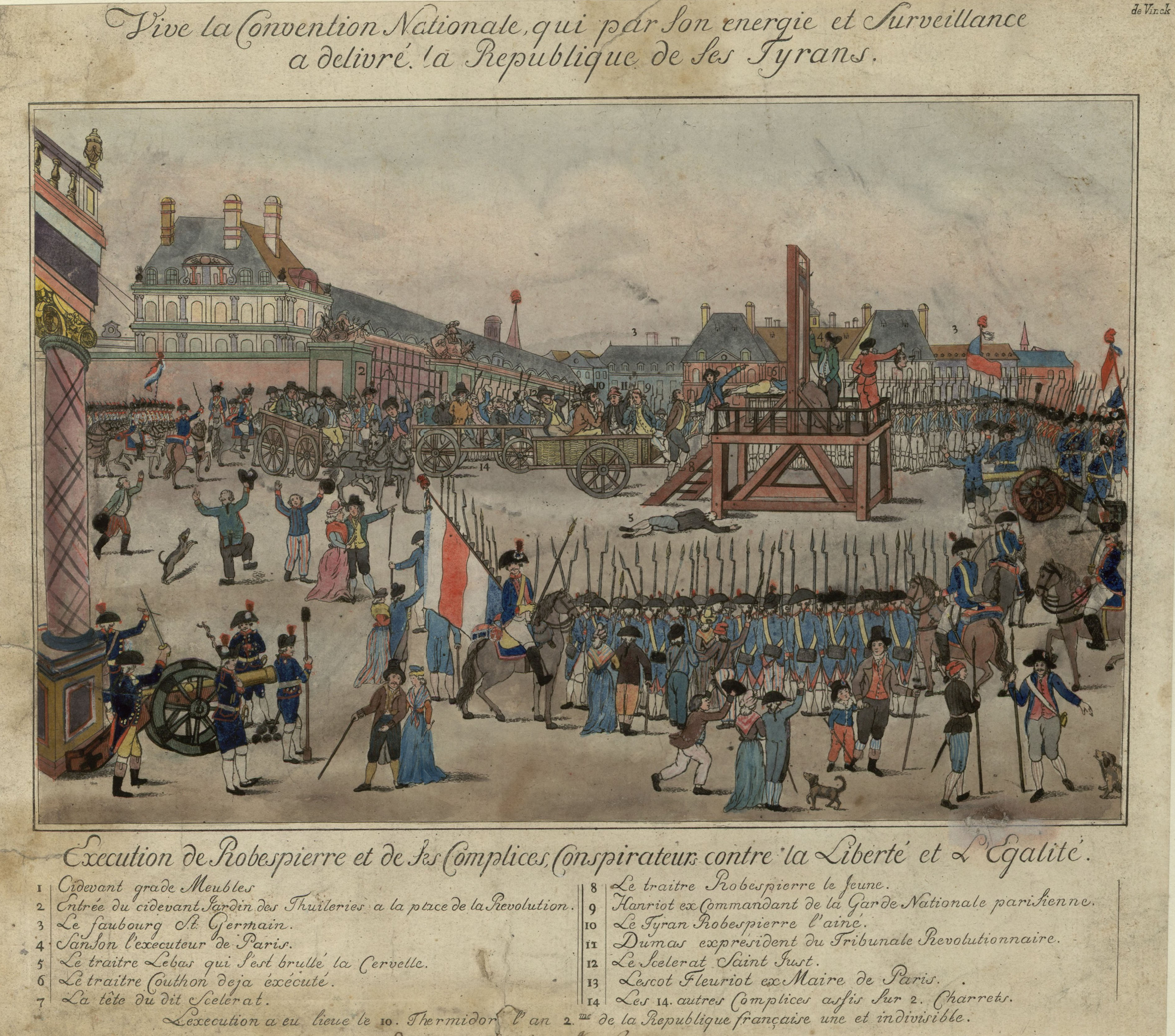
Robespierre and associates executed 1794

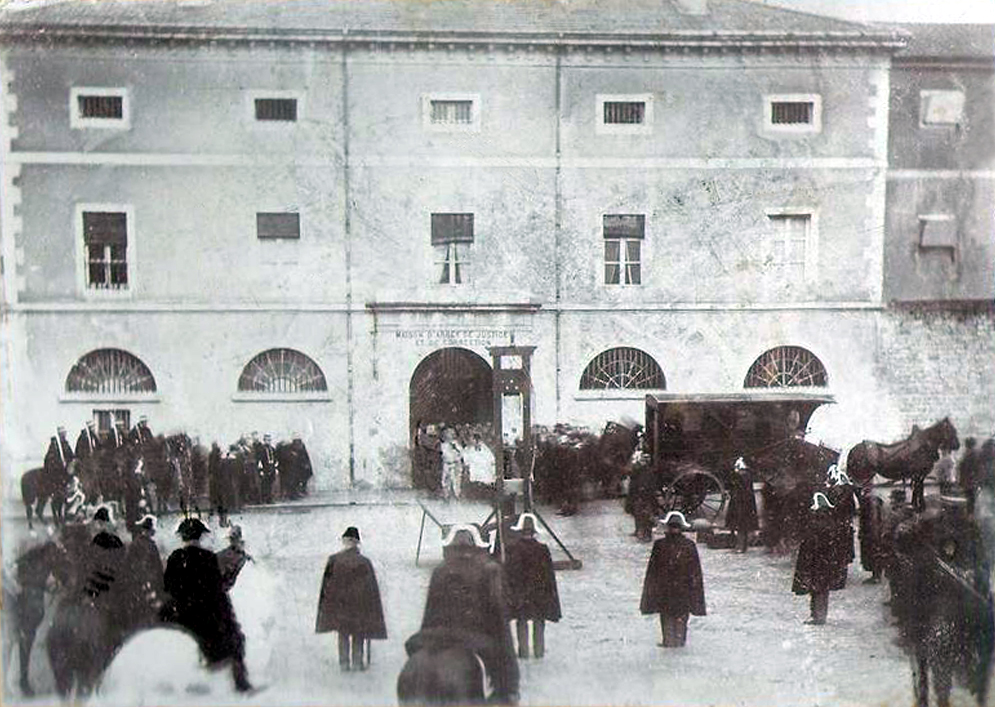
Public execution by guillotine in Lons-le-Saunier, 1897

The first campaign towards the abolition of the death penalty began on 30 May 1791, but on 6 October that year the National Assembly refused to pass a law abolishing the death penalty. However, they did abolish torture, and also declared that there would now be only one method of execution: "Tout condamné à mort aura la tête tranchée" (All condemned to death will have their heads cut off).

In 1789, physician Joseph-Ignace Guillotin proposed that all executions be carried out by a simple and painless mechanism, which led to the development and eventual adoption of the guillotine. Beheading had previously been reserved only for nobles and carried out manually by handheld axes or blades; commoners would usually be hanged or subjected to more brutal methods. Therefore, the adoption of the guillotine for all criminals regardless of social status not only made executions more efficient and less painful, but it also removed the class divisions in capital punishment altogether. As a result, many felt the device made the death penalty more humane and egalitarian.

The guillotine was first used on Nicolas Jacques Pelletier on 25 April 1792. Guillotine usage then spread to other countries such as Germany (where it had been used since before the revolution), Italy, Sweden (used in a single execution), the Netherlands and French colonies in Africa, Canada, French Guiana and French Indochina. Although other governments employed the device, France has executed more people by guillotine than any other nation.

=== Penal Code of 1791 ===
On 6 October 1791, the Penal Code of 1791 was enacted, which abolished capital punishment in the Kingdom of France for bestiality, blasphemy, heresy, pederasty, sacrilege, sodomy, and witchcraft.

=== 1939 onwards ===
Public executions were the norm and continued until 1939. From the mid-19th century, the usual time of day for executions changed from around 3 pm to morning and then to dawn. Executions had been carried out in large central public spaces such as market squares but gradually moved towards the local prison. In the early 20th century, the guillotine was set up just outside the prison gates. The last person to be publicly guillotined was six-time murderer Eugen Weidmann who was executed on 17 June 1939 outside the St-Pierre prison in Versailles. Photographs of the execution appeared in the press, and apparently this spectacle led the government to stop public executions and to hold them instead in prison courtyards, such as La Santé Prison in Paris. Following the law, the first to be guillotined inside a prison was Jean Dehaene, who had murdered his estranged wife and father-in-law, executed on 19 July 1939 at St-Brieuc.

The 1940s and the wartime period saw an increase in the number of executions, including the first executions of women since the 19th century.

Marie-Louise Giraud was executed on 30 July 1943 for being an abortion provider, which was labeled a crime against state security.

In the 1950s to the 1970s, the number of executions steadily decreased, with for example President Georges Pompidou, between 1969 and 1974, giving clemency to all but three people out of the fifteen sentenced to death. President Valéry Giscard d'Estaing oversaw the last executions.

Up to 1981, the French penal code stated that:

- Article 12: "Any person sentenced to death shall be decapitated."
- Article 13: "By exception to article 12, when the death penalty is handed down for crimes against the safety of the State, execution shall take place by firing squad."
- Article 14: "If the families of the executed persons wish to reclaim the bodies, they shall have them; it shall then be for them to have them buried without any pomp."

In addition, crimes such as treason, espionage, insurrection, piracy, aggravated murder, kidnapping with torture, felonies committed with the use of torture, setting a bomb in a street, arson of a dwelling house, and armed robbery made their authors liable to the death penalty; moreover, committing some military offenses such as mutiny or desertion or being accomplice or attempting to commit a capital felony were also capital offenses.

==== Clemency ====
The right to commute death sentences belonged exclusively to the President of the Republic, whereas it had belonged exclusively to the monarch in earlier ages.

President Charles de Gaulle, who supported capital punishment, commuted 24 death sentences. During his term of office, 35 people were guillotined, 4 others executed by firing squad for crimes against the security of the state, while 3 others were reprieved by amnesty in 1968. The last of those executed by firing squad was OAS member Lt. Colonel Jean-Marie Bastien-Thiry, who was an organizer of the infamous assassination attempt on de Gaulle in 1962.

No executions took place during the two-term acting President Alain Poher, neither in 1969 following De Gaulle's resignation, nor in 1974 following Pompidou's death.

President Georges Pompidou, who opposed capital punishment, commuted all but three death sentences imposed during his term.

President Valéry Giscard d'Estaing, who stated that he "felt a deep aversion to the death penalty", also commuted all but three death sentences. During his presidency, the last three capital executions in France took place.

==== Amnesty ====
Parliament (rather than the executive) held the power to grant amnesty for death sentences. One example of general amnesty for all people sentenced to death and awaiting execution took place in 1959 after de Gaulle's inauguration when an Act of Parliament commuted all such sentences.

=== Abolition ===
The first official debate on the death penalty in France took place on 30 May 1791 with the presentation of a bill aimed at abolishing it. The advocate was Louis-Michel Lepeletier of Saint-Fargeau and revolutionary leader Maximilien de Robespierre supported the bill. However, the National Constituent Assembly, on 6 October 1791, refused to abolish the death penalty. Soon after, tens of thousands of people of various social classes would be executed by guillotine during the Reign of Terror.

On 26 October 1795, the National Convention abolished capital punishment, but only to signify the day of general peace. The death penalty was reinstated on 12 February 1810, under Emperor Napoleon I, in the French Imperial Penal Code.

In 1848, the provisional government of the French Second Republic, established by the February Revolution, decreed the abolition of the death penalty for political crimes.

President Armand Fallières, a supporter of abolition, systematically pardoned every convict condemned to death over the first three years of his term (1906–1913). In 1906 the Commission of the Budget of the Chamber of Deputies voted for withdrawing funding for the guillotine, with the aim of stopping the execution procedure. On 3 July 1908 the Keeper of the Seals, Aristide Briand, submitted a draft law to the Deputies, dated November 1906, on the abolition of the death penalty. Despite the support of Jean Jaurès, the bill was rejected on 8 December by 330 votes to 201.

Under the pro-Nazi Vichy Regime, Marshal Pétain refused to pardon five women due to be guillotined; no woman had been guillotined in France in over five decades. Pétain was himself sentenced to death following the overthrow of the Vichy Regime, but General Charles de Gaulle commuted Pétain's sentence to life imprisonment on the grounds of his old age (89 years), as well as his previous military duty during the First World War. Other Vichy officials, including notably Pierre Laval, were not so fortunate and were shot. Under Vincent Auriol's presidency, three more women were beheaded, one in Algeria and two in France. The last Frenchwoman to be beheaded, Germaine Leloy-Godefroy, was executed in Angers in 1949. In 1963, Lieutenant Colonel Jean-Marie Bastien-Thiry became the last person to be executed by a firing squad.

Defended by lawyer Robert Badinter, child murderer Patrick Henry narrowly escaped being condemned to death on 20 January 1977, and numerous newspapers predicted the end of the death penalty. On 10 September 1977, Hamida Djandoubi was guillotined and became both the last person executed in France as well as the last person executed by beheading in the Western world, and by any means in Western Europe. On 18 September 1981, Badinter—the new Minister of Justice—proposed the final abolition of the death penalty in the National Assembly, the same day as the newly-elected socialist president François Mitterrand backed his efforts, and the National Assembly finally pushed abolition through that same year. Badinter had been a longtime opponent of capital punishment and the defense attorney of some of the last men to be executed.

In 1980, French abolished the death penalty for juvenile offenders. The last execution of a juvenile was of 17-year-old André Vitel, who was guillotined in 1939. Vitel was sentenced to death for murdering his sister-in-law and six-month-old nephew during a robbery just a month after his 17th birthday. He was also the last French national to be publicly guillotined in France. Vitel was not the last juvenile offender to be executed by French authorities, however. Eighteen-year-old Võ Thị Sáu was executed by French military authorities in French Indochina in 1952 for several bombings that she carried out when she was sixteen.

In 1976, a 17-year-old boy was sentenced to death for the murder of an elderly woman, but his sentence was commuted to life imprisonment by the president.

==== Abolition process in 1981 ====
- 16 March 1981: During the presidential election campaign, François Mitterrand declared that he was against the death penalty. This was taken up in the Socialist Party's 110 Propositions for France electoral program, along with other justice reforms.
- 19 March: The last sentence of death (against Philippe Maurice) was confirmed by the Court of Cassation, the last to gain legal force.
- 10 May: Mitterrand was elected President in the second round against Valery Giscard d'Estaing.
- 25 May: François Mitterrand commuted Philippe Maurice’s sentence to life imprisonment. He was released on license in 2000.
- 26 August: the Council of Ministers approved the bill to abolish the death penalty.
- 17 September: Robert Badinter presented the bill to the National Assembly. It passed on 18 September, by 363 votes to 117.
- 28 September: The Court of Assizes of Haut-Rhin issued the very last sentence of death, in absentia, against tailor Jean-Michel Marx for attempted murder. From May to September, a total of four sentences of death were issued by the lower courts after Philippe's case was confirmed by the supreme court, but never ratified by the Court of Cassation. On the same day, Robert Badinter presented his bill to abolish the death penalty before the Senate.
- 30 September: several amendments were rejected in the Senate. The law was officially passed by the two chambers.
- 9 October: the law was promulgated and all seven remaining sentences commuted. The last Western European country to practise the death penalty abolished it.

== Current status ==
Today, the death penalty has been abolished in France. Although a few modern-day French politicians (notably the far-right National Front former leader Jean-Marie Le Pen) advocate restoring the death penalty, its re-establishment would not be possible without the unilateral French rejection of several international treaties. (Repudiation of international treaties is not unknown to the French system, as France renounced its obligations under the NATO treaty in 1966, though it rejoined the pact in 2009.)

On 20 December 1985, France ratified Additional Protocol number 6 to the European Convention to Safeguard Human Rights and fundamental liberties. This prevents France from re-establishing the death penalty, except in times of war or by denouncing the Convention.

On 21 June 2001, Jacques Chirac sent a letter to the association "Ensemble" saying he was against the death penalty: "It's a fight we have to lead with determination and conviction, because no justice is infallible and each execution can kill an innocent; because nothing can legitimise the execution of minors or of people suffering from mental deficiencies; because death can never constitute an act of justice." On 3 May 2002, France and 30 other countries signed Protocol number 13 to the European Convention on Human Rights. This forbids the death penalty in all circumstances, even in times of war. It went into effect on 1 July 2003, after having been ratified by 10 states.

Despite these efforts, in 2004, a law proposition (number 1521) was placed before the French National Assembly, suggesting re-establishment of the death penalty for terrorist acts. The bill was not adopted. On 3 January 2006, Jacques Chirac announced a revision of the Constitution aimed at writing out the death penalty. (On the previous 13 October, the Constitutional Council had deemed the ratification of the Second Optional Protocol to the international pact necessitated such a revision of the Constitution. The protocol concerned civil and political rights aimed at abolishing the death penalty.)

On 19 February 2007, the Congress of the French Parliament (the National Assembly and the Senate, reunited for the day) voted overwhelmingly for a modification of the Constitution stating that "no one can be sentenced to the death penalty." There were 828 votes for the modification, and 26 against. The amendment entered the Constitution on 23 February.

In May 2023, Franco-Algerian consultant Tayeb Benabderrahmane was sentenced to death in absentia in Qatar on charges of espionage, a decision criticized by his lawyers and the subject of international proceedings. He had previously spent 307 days in arbitrary detention in Qatar in 2020.

== Variations in French opinion ==
During the 20th century, polls have shown large differences in French opinion on the death penalty.

- In 1908, Le Petit Parisien published a poll in which 77% of people asked were in favour of the death penalty.
- In 1960, a survey from the IFOP showed that 50% of the French were against, while 39% were for.
- In 1972, in a survey from the same institute, 27% of those surveyed were for abolition while 63% were for capital punishment.
- In 1981, Le Figaro carried out a survey the day after the vote for abolition. It indicated that 62% of the French were for maintaining the death penalty.
- In 1998, IFOP's and France-Soir's survey showed that opinions were split in half, with 54% against the death penalty and 44% for it.
- In 2006, a TNS Sofres survey showed opposition of the French people to death penalty generally: 52% were against death penalty and 41% were pro-death penalty.
- In 2007, according to Angus Reid Global Monitor, 52% of French were anti-death penalty and 45% were pro-death penalty.
- In 2013, a Opinionway survey showed that 50% of the French people supported re-introduction of the death penalty, up from 45% in 2012 and 35% in 2011.
- In 2020, a Ipsos/Sopra Steria survey showed that 55% of the French people supported re-introduction of the death penalty. The survey found that 85% percent of voters of the National Rally party (RN) supported the death penalty, with 71% for the conservative party Les Républicains, and 39% for voters of the liberal LREM, the Socialist Party, the green EELV and the left LFI.

== Executions from 1958 to abolition ==
The following people were executed during the Fifth Republic (between 1959 and 1977), making them the last executed people in France.

| Executed person | Date of execution | Place of execution | Crime | Method | Under president |
|---|---|---|---|---|---|
| Jean Dupont | 14 April 1959 | Paris | Child murder with premeditation | Guillotine | Charles de Gaulle |
| Abcha Ahmed | 30 July 1959 | Metz | Murder with premeditation | Guillotine | Charles de Gaulle |
| Mohamed Benzouzou | 26 September 1959 | Lyon | Murder with premeditation | Guillotine | Charles de Gaulle |
| Mouloud Aït Rabah | 23 February 1960 | Lyon | Murder with premeditation | Guillotine | Charles de Gaulle |
| Ahmed Cherchari | 23 February 1960 | Lyon | Murder with premeditation | Guillotine | Charles de Gaulle |
| Abdallah Kabouche | 17 March 1960 | Lyon | Murder with premeditation | Guillotine | Charles de Gaulle |
| Mohamed Feghoul | 5 April 1960 | Lyon | Assassination | Guillotine | Charles de Gaulle |
| Menaï Brahimi | 5 April 1960 | Lyon | Accomplice of Feghoul's premeditated murder | Guillotine | Charles de Gaulle |
| René Pons | 21 June 1960 | Bordeaux | Matricide | Guillotine | Charles de Gaulle |
| Boukhemis Taffer | 9 July 1960 | Lyon | Terrorist attack | Guillotine | Charles de Gaulle |
| Georges Rapin | 26 July 1960 | Paris | Murder with premeditation | Guillotine | Charles de Gaulle |
| Abderrahmane Lakhlifi | 30 July 1960 | Lyon | Accomplice of assassination attempts | Guillotine | Charles de Gaulle |
| Miloud Bougandoura | 5 August 1960 | Lyon | Multiple murders | Guillotine | Charles de Gaulle |
| Abdelkader Makhlouf | 5 August 1960 | Lyon | Multiple murders | Guillotine | Charles de Gaulle |
| Salah Dehil | 31 January 1961 | Lyon | Terrorist attack | Guillotine | Charles de Gaulle |
| Louis Jalbaud | 7 December 1961 | Marseille | Multiple murders before robbery | Guillotine | Charles de Gaulle |
| Albert Dovecar | 7 June 1962 | Marly-le-Roi | Assassination against Algiers Commissaire principal Roger Gavoury | Firing Squad | Charles de Gaulle |
| Claude Piegts | 7 June 1962 | Marly-le-Roi | Assassination against Algiers Commissaire principal Roger Gavoury | Firing Squad | Charles de Gaulle |
| Lt. Roger Degueldre | 6 July 1962 | Ivry-sur-Seine | Treason/Multiple murders | Firing Squad | Charles de Gaulle |
| Lt. Col. Jean Bastien-Thiry | 11 March 1963 | Ivry-sur-Seine | Treason/Assassination attempt against President Charles de Gaulle | Firing Squad | Charles de Gaulle |
| Stanislas Juhant | 17 March 1964 | Paris | Murder after robbery | Guillotine | Charles de Gaulle |
| Raymond Anama | 17 June 1964 | Fort-de-France | Murder with premeditation | Guillotine | Charles de Gaulle |
| Robert Actis | 27 June 1964 | Lyon | Murder before robbery | Guillotine | Charles de Gaulle |
| Mazouz Ghaouti | 27 June 1964 | Lyon | | Guillotine | Charles de Gaulle |
| Lambert Gau | 22 June 1965 | Fort-de-France | Murder with premeditation | Guillotine | Charles de Gaulle |
| Saïb Hachani | 22 March 1966 | Lyon | Multiple murders with premeditation | Guillotine | Charles de Gaulle |
| Günther Volz | 16 December 1967 | Metz | Child murder after rape | Guillotine | Charles de Gaulle |
| Jean-Laurent Olivier | 11 March 1969 | Amiens | Multiple child murders after rape | Guillotine | Charles de Gaulle |
| Roger Bontems | 28 November 1972 | Paris | Hostage crisis and accomplice of Buffet's murders with threats of death (was serving 20 years for armed robbery) | Guillotine | Georges Pompidou |
| Claude Buffet | 28 November 1972 | Paris | Murder of a prison guard and a prison nurse in an hostage crisis (while already serving a life sentence for murder) | Guillotine | Georges Pompidou |
| Ali Ben Yanes | 12 May 1973 | Marseille | Child murder after aggravated assault and attempted murder | Guillotine | Georges Pompidou |
| Christian Ranucci | 28 July 1976 | Marseille | Child murder after kidnapping | Guillotine | Valéry Giscard d'Estaing |
| Jérôme Carrein | 23 June 1977 | Douai | Child murder after kidnapping and attempted rape | Guillotine | Valéry Giscard d'Estaing |
| Hamida Djandoubi | 10 September 1977 | Marseille | Torture murder after pimping and rape | Guillotine | Valéry Giscard d'Estaing |

== Notable opponents ==
- Michel de Montaigne (writer and philosopher)
- Voltaire (writer and philosopher)
- Nicolas de Condorcet (philosopher)
- François-René de Chateaubriand (writer and journalist)
- Alphonse de Lamartine (writer and politician)
- Victor Hugo (writer and politician)
- Flora Tristan (social activist and suffragist)
- Victor Schœlcher (journalist and politician)
- Léon Gambetta (politician)
- Joseph Reinach (politician)
- Jean Jaurès (Socialist leader)
- Aristide Briand (politician, long-time President of the Council and Minister)
- Gaston Leroux (writer)
- Albert Camus (writer)
- Noëlla Rouget (French Resistance member and teacher)
- Michel Foucault (philosopher)
- Robert Badinter (attorney and Minister of Justice)
- Julien Clerc (singer)

== Notable advocates ==
- Francis I of France (King of France)
- Catherine de' Medici (Queen Regent and Queen consort of France)
- Henry IV of France (King of France)
- Cardinal Richelieu (Prime Minister of France)
- Louis XIII (King of France)
- Louis XIV (King of France)
- Louis XV (King of France)
- Charles de Secondat, baron de Montesquieu (philosopher)
- Jean-Jacques Rousseau (philosopher)
- Louis XVI (King of France, then King of the French)
- Marie Antoinette (Queen consort of France)
- Napoleon Bonaparte (Emperor of the French)
- Napoleon III (Emperor of the French)
- Louis XVIII (King of the French)
- Charles X (King of France)
- Louis-Philippe I (King of the French)
- Joseph De Maistre (philosopher and diplomat)
- Alexis De Tocqueville (philosopher and diplomat)
- Benjamin Constant (philosopher and politician)
- Auguste Comte (philosopher)
- Maurice Barrès (writer and politician)
- Charles Maurras (writer and philosopher)
- Philippe Petain (leader of Vichy France)
- Charles de Gaulle (President) (only for men; commuted the third of the sentences)
- Jean-Marie Le Pen (politician)
- Alain Delon (actor)
- Alain Madelin (politician)
- Robert Ménard (politician)
- Éric Zemmour (writer and journalist)

== Bibliography ==
- Klemettilä, Hannele: The executioner in late medieval French culture. Turun yliopiston julkaisuja. Sarja B, Humaniora. vol.268. Tuku: Turun Yliplisto, 2003. ISBN 951-29-2538-9.
