= Christian Ranucci =

French criminal (1954–1976)

- Ranucci's mugshot
- Born: Christian Jean Gilbert Ranucci; 6 April 1954; Avignon, France
- Died: 28 July 1976 (aged 22); Baumettes Prison, Marseille, France
- Cause of death: Execution by guillotine
- Resting place: Cimetière Saint-Véran, Avignon
- Other name: "Le bourreau du bois de Valdonne" ("The torturer of the wood of Valdonne")
- Education: Brevet élémentaire du premier cycle (1971)
- Alma mater: Cours privé Albert-Camus, Nice
- Occupation: Door-to-door (probation)
- Conviction: Murder with aggravating circumstances (10 March 1976)
- Penalty: Death (10 March 1976)

Details
- Victims: Marie-Dolorès Rambla, 8
- Date: 3 June 1974
- State: Bouches-du-Rhône
- Locations: Marseille (abduction); Belcodène (car accident); Peypin (murder scene)
- Weapons: Stones, flick knife
- Date apprehended: 5 June 1974
- Military career
- Allegiance: France
- Branch: French Army
- Service years: 1973–1974
- Rank: Corporal
- Unit: 8e groupement de chasseurs mécanisés

Christian Ranucci (French pronunciation: [kʁistjɑ̃ ʁanutʃi]; 6 April 1954 – 28 July 1976) was a French man convicted for the abduction and killing of an eight-year-old girl on Whit Monday 1974. Sentenced to death by beheading on 10 March 1976, Ranucci was the third-to-last person executed in France, though he was frequently cited as the last due to the notoriety and media frenzy over the case.

Ranucci's case greatly influenced the debate over capital punishment in France after the book Le Pull-over rouge (1978) was published by former lawyer and journalist Gilles Perrault. It called Ranucci's guilt into question, and had a notable impact on public opinion, with over one million copies sold, and was translated into twenty languages.

== Biography ==
=== Early life ===
Christian Ranucci was born in Avignon on 6 April 1954 to Jean Ranucci (1921–1988), a board painter and veteran of the Indochina War, and Héloïse Mathon (1922–2013), a child minder.

When he was four years old, he witnessed his father slashing his mother in the face with a knife—similar to the one Ranucci would later use to commit murder—at the door of a court after their divorce had been pronounced. However, other sources, like Ranucci's father, testified that his son did not really witness this attack, but only saw his injured mother as a friend of hers was bringing him in his arms. The two soon fled, moving home numerous times, as Héloïse Mathon was afraid that her ex-husband would kill them both. As a result of this experience, she became an overprotective mother. Years later, Ranucci, charged with Rambla's murder, confessed to the examining magistrate that he had lived his entire childhood with the constant fear that his father, depicted as violent by his mother, would eventually find and kill him. According to psychiatry court experts, Ranucci and Mathon had then grown exclusive to each other.

During his school years, Ranucci was described as a mediocre pupil, repeating a year, but still earning his National Diploma (BEPC) at the age of 17. He was often violent towards his schoolmates, and remained immature and uncommunicative as a young man. Meanwhile, he worked as a waiter in a bar, Le Rio Bravo, owned by his mother, located in Saint-Jean-de-Moirans, near Voiron (Isère), which he ran when she was absent.

=== Adulthood, army service and job ===
They had lived in Nice since 1970. Young Christian completed his education in Cours Camus. He and his mother moved to Avenue des Terrasses de la Corniche Fleurie, located above the city, around 1971.

His political views were somewhat conservative, as he supported a single bounty to resorb poverty. While charged with Rambla's murder and incarcerated, he expressed anticommunist opinion in a letter to his mother. Furthermore, his reading in jail included Paris Match and Le Figaro. His letters also included antideist remarks. He had lived in a posh residence with a communal swimming pool in a 3-room flat owned by his mother. He first sought to buy a Mercedes 220, but as it was too expensive for his mother, he bought a grey Peugeot 304 coupé. Ranucci seemed to be fixated on the Mercedes model, as he claimed later in a document that policemen in charge of the inquiry came and got him with this vehicle, whereas he was transferred to Marseille in a Renault 12.

Ranucci eventually went to Wittlich, in Rhineland-Palatinate (West Germany), in order to complete his military service, before being called up in April 1973. In July 1973, he was granted the rank of corporal. He left service on 5 April 1974. According to testimony from several comrades from his army days, his behaviour was impulsive and his reactions were sometimes disproportionate. He was antimilitarist. Insubordinate with his army superiors, he made efforts to avoid chore duty and long marches.

Later, as the murder case against him was unfolding, he was picked out as the abductor and molester of two children from Nice, which could have taken place during Ranucci's army days and a few days after he came back home, though he was never arrested for this and these suspicions were never formally proven.

On 24 May 1974, he was hired by Ets COTTO, a company that made and sold air-conditioning equipment based in Nice, and began working as a door-to-door salesman.

=== Kidnapping and murder of Marie-Dolorès Rambla ===
When his mother refused to accompany him on a Pentecost weekend trip, Ranucci left Nice alone on 2 June 1974. After visiting the region, he arrived in Marseille on the morning of 3 June 1974. Looking for the home of a former military service comrade, he stopped in the Cité Sainte-Agnès housing estate in the 4th arrondissement. Noticing a group of children playing around 10:30 am, he came across eight-year-old Marie-Dolorès Rambla and her six-and-a-half-year-old brother Jean-Baptiste, along with two other children, playing behind a building in the car park of a local multistorey garage. He watched them for thirty to forty-five minutes, intending to wait until there were fewer around before kidnapping Marie-Dolorès.

When the Rambla children were alone, around 11:00 am, they picked flowers for their mother. Maria Rambla, their mother, asked them to go home for lunch, then Marie-Dolorès asked to stay for a moment more.

Around 11:10–11:15 am, Ranucci moved his car to the car park on the same level where the children were. Telling them he had lost a "big black dog", he asked for their help in searching for it. Sending the little boy off to track down the non-existent dog, he stayed with Marie-Dolorès, chatting for a few minutes, then persuaded her to get into his car. According to his later confession, the girl was initially reluctant to go with him, making him repeat his offer; he eventually gained her trust by promising to return her home for lunch time.

An hour later, arriving at a crossroads, he went through a stop sign and collided with another car, damaging both vehicles. He subsequently turned around and fled in the direction of Marseille, drove a few hundred metres before he stopped at the bottom of a hill, exited from his car with the young girl, and climbed up into underbrush holding her left arm. Hearing Marie-Dolorès screaming and crying, as she had just lost her right shoe and had to walk barefoot over the vegetation, he grabbed her by the neck and pushed her temple to the ground. He hit her head with stones then stabbed her in the throat with his flick knife; she reportedly received about 15 blows. Rambla tried to resist by raising her right hand, but Ranucci soon stabbed the dorsal side of her hand. Afterwards, he covered the body with briars and thornbushes.

Returning to his car, he drove for a while, then hid in a mushroom farm in order to change his flat tyre and bloodied clothes, clean up, and hide his knife. However, when leaving, he needed help from people to get his car out of the mud. At 5 pm, Ranucci requested service from a former digger who had become a farm labourer (the mushroom farm was in fact an abandoned mine), Mohamed Rahou. The owner, Henri Guazzone, and Rahou eventually got the car out of the mud with a tractor. After having accepted a cup of tea from the Rahous, Ranucci returned to his home, Corniche Fleurie, overlooking Nice.

=== Arrest, confession and psychological profile ===
Ranucci was arrested two days after the murder as he was returning from work to his home in Nice. The girl's corpse had been found shortly before by a squad of gendarmes. He had been identified by his registration plate number, provided by witnesses to the car accident during his flight with the child. He confessed to the abduction and murder of Marie-Dolorès Rambla, and drew an accurate sketch of the kidnapping, then indicated the place where he disposed of the murder weapon, which was later found buried in a peat field stack by gendarmes.

After being arrested, he was not recognized by the two witnesses to the abduction, and the only physical evidence implicating him in this phase of the crime was the drawing he made while in police custody showing the estate where the Rambla family lived.

Psychiatrists who heard Ranucci's conversation during sessions diagnosed him as having an "immature and backward sexuality". According to their report, this, coupled with a need for company, had led to the desire to take children and spend time with them. He was not profiled as a pedophile, but rather as someone whose sexual identity remained undefined, though the psychiatrists asserted he showed "keen interest" in children. While confessing, Ranucci claimed he had no intention of harming the girl and only wished to go for a ride with her. He explained the murder was a result of panic and fear due to the accident.

His motive for the abduction still remains unclear, as no signs of rape or other sexual assault were found on the victim's body. Months later, while incarcerated at Baumettes prison (9th arrondissement of Marseille), he repudiated his confession after learning he was of the same blood type as the little girl (bloodstains had been found on his pants seized in his car trunk), and hearing about a local pedophile who wore a red polo shirt or sweater—according to testimonies—similar to the one discovered near the mushroom farm where he had hidden after the murder.

André Fraticelli, Ranucci's lawyer, originally planned to plead mitigating factors, citing his client's difficult childhood, the sight of his father slashing his mother's face, and the numerous moves made across France as a defence in court. Fraticelli wanted the jury to consider Ranucci's state of mind and consciousness while committing murder and whether he was really accountable for the crime, rather than his guilt. (Note: According to article 64 of the Penal Code, no one can be tried if he acted in a state of insanity.) However, as Ranucci had retracted his confession, his other two lawyers conformed to his wishes, and chose to plead his innocence. (Note: Fraticelli said about the defence strategy: "You do not play poker with a man's life (...). This is the reason why I thought we had to plead guilty, with mitigating circumstances which were densely represented and possible.")

=== Trial and execution ===
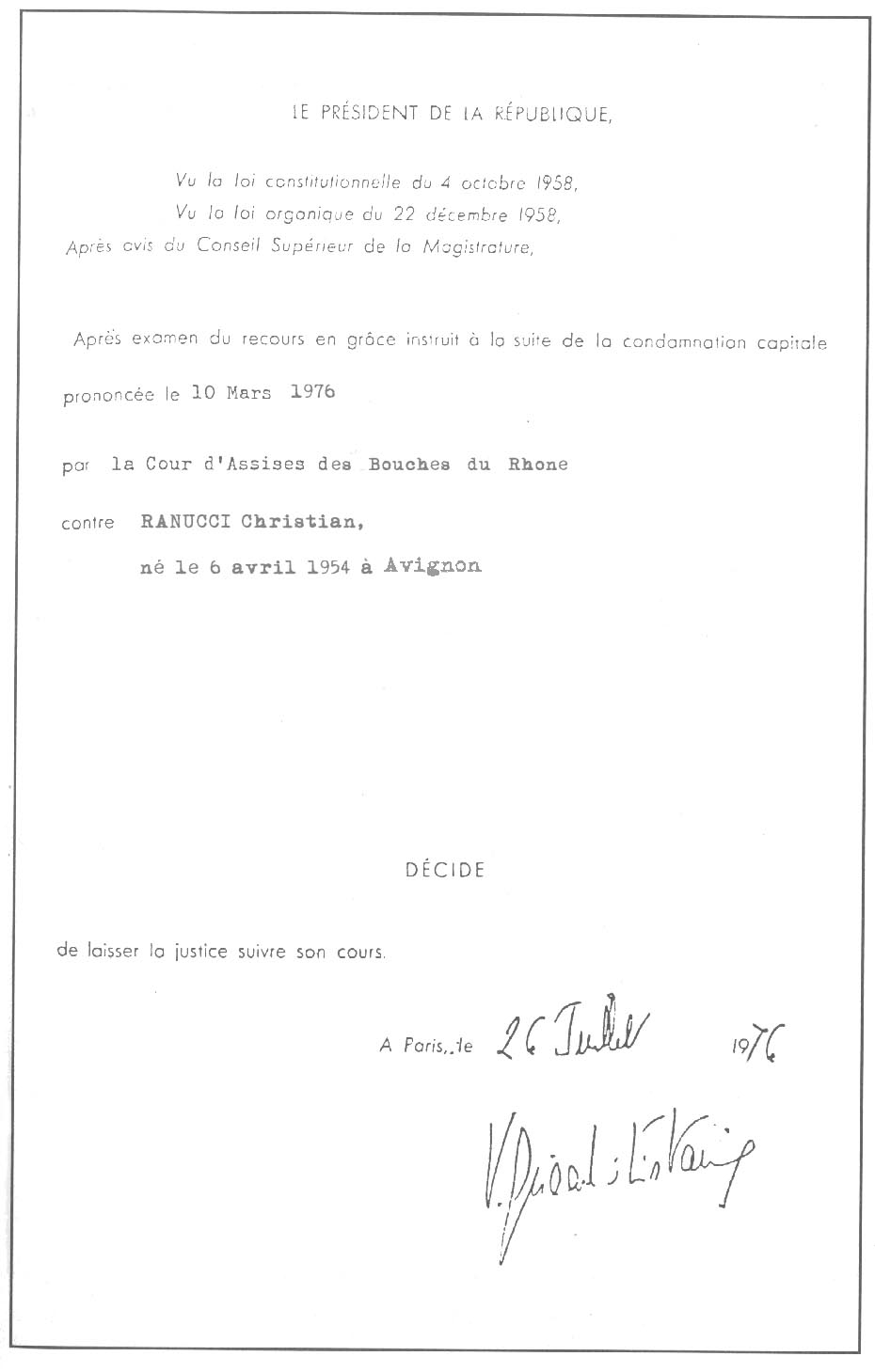
Presidential decision of 26 July 1976 turning down Ranucci's clemency petition

He was tried in Aix-en-Provence in southern France on 9 and 10 March 1976, just three weeks after Patrick Henry was arrested in Troyes for another child murder. Journalists described public opinion as sensitive to the point of hysteria, demanding death sentences for child murderers.

On the advice of his mother, Ranucci came to court dressed like a clergyman sporting a large pectoral cross, which irritated most of the jury and was interpreted by a few observers as an indication of his immaturity. During the trial Ranucci denied the crime and his guilt despite the physical evidence and the details he had provided during his confession. Found guilty on all counts on 10 March 1976, he was sentenced to death. During the last hearing, and after his advocate's plea, minutes were communicated at the last moment to the jury and the defence lawyers, which, while not unheard of or illegal, was an extremely rare procedure. This was later used as an argument before the Court of Cassation.

Again on his mother's advice, Ranucci wrote a 74-page document titled "Récapitulatif" ("Summary") while on death row, in which he summed up the case from his point of view and attempted to prove he was innocent. Gérard Bouladou, a retired police officer who has written books about the case, has observed signs of mythomania and even paranoia against the investigators in this document—as he was toward his army superiors—and argued that Ranucci was trying to persuade himself of his own innocence. His appeal for a second trial was denied by the Court of Cassation on 17 June 1976.

On 26 July, President Valéry Giscard d'Estaing eventually refused a pardon for Ranucci. He was executed by guillotine in the courtyard of Baumettes prison, in Marseilles, on 28 July 1976, at 4:13 am. Two of his lawyers who witnessed the execution claimed his last words were "Réhabilitez-moi !" ("Clear my name!"), but executioner André Obrecht wrote in his memoirs that the condemned said nothing before dying, his last word being a "Negative!" shouted at the chaplain when he refused to receive communion. His third lawyer, André Fraticelli, confirmed that Ranucci never asked to be rehabilitated. It is also specified in the execution report that Ranucci "made no statement".

== Aftermath: controversy, political debate and review requests ==
In 1978, a novel by Gilles Perrault, entitled Le Pull-over rouge (The Red Sweater), disputed Ranucci's involvement in the crime, expressing the writer's doubts about his guilt. The title of the book refers to a red sweater found hidden in the mushroom bed where Ranucci hid after his car accident, which seemed similar to that worn by another man who sexually abused children in another Marseilles estate just two days before Rambla's kidnapping and murder. During the inquiry, when asked about the sweater, Ranucci denied being its owner. In his book, Perrault took on board Ranucci's final defence, arguing that a concussion he allegedly suffered as a result of the accident, right at the bottom of the crime scene, caused Ranucci to become victim to manipulation and impersonation by the "real murderer". In this theory, the man is supposed to have moved the unconscious door-to-door salesman to the rear seat of Ranucci's own car, then drove the vehicle (carrying Ranucci) to the mushroom shed where he then hid his red sweater. However, nothing within the penal case could corroborate this version; Perrault himself had no explanation or rebuttal to the main evidence, in particular the hiding place of the murder weapon Ranucci revealed.

The victim's father, Pierre Rambla, vehemently opposed the book and the subsequent campaign that supported Perrault's theses, arguing it made his family suffer, especially his elder son Jean-Baptiste who is among the last people to have seen Marie-Dolorès alive.

The book was made into a film by Michel Drach in 1979, starring Serge Avédikian as Ranucci. A television film about the case, L'affaire Christian Ranucci: Le combat d'une mère, starring Alexandre Hamidi and Catherine Frot as Christian Ranucci and his mother, was broadcast in 2007.

The controversy next entered politics, influencing the debate on capital punishment in France, which culminated in criminal lawyer, and newly nominated Minister of Justice, Robert Badinter addressing the National Assembly in September 1981 to defend his bill to abolish capital punishment. As a request for reconsideration had been submitted to him, he claimed, with regard to the Ranucci case, that there were: "too many questions about his case, and [that] these questions were sufficient [...] to condemn the death penalty". Le Monde widely endorsed Perrault's theses, with journalist Philippe Boucher. On the other hand, some journalists who covered the case rejected Perrault's miscarriage of justice arguments. Christian Chardon, who covered the case for Détective, wrote an article for the newspaper Minute titled "Non ! L'affaire Ranucci n'est pas une erreur judiciaire" ("No! The Ranucci case was not a miscarriage of justice") in late 1978, in which he recapped the key points of the case and argued for Ranucci's guilt. Chardon denied that Ranucci had been tortured as claimed during his trial. (In particular, he had accused Commissioner Gérard Alessandra, chief of the criminal section "Nord" in the Hôtel de Police de Marseille, who was in charge of the inquiry.) In late 1979, Jean Laborde published an article in Paris-Match which he titled "Ranucci innocent ? Eh bien non !" ("Ranucci innocent? Well no!"), also rejecting Perrault's claims regarding Ranucci's innocence.

In 1989, having accused the policemen in charge of the inquiry of "abuse of authority" in a 1985 TV program titled "28 juillet 1976 : Qui a tué Christian Ranucci ?" (28 July 1976: Who killed Christian Ranucci?), Gilles Perrault, as well as the presenter, was found guilty of defamation and fined 30,000 francs to be paid to each of the five policemen, a sentence confirmed and raised on appeals and cassation to 70,000 francs for each plaintiff. In 2008, Perrault and his publisher Fayard were found guilty of defamation against the Marseille police in another book, L'ombre de Christian Ranucci, in which it was stated that the investigators behaved with "casualness and partisanship". Perrault was fined 5,000 euros and his publisher an equal sum for each policeman defamed, a decision confirmed and increased to 10,000 euro for each of the four policemen on appeal in 2009.

Since the publishing of Le Pull-over rouge, which was followed by the creation of the "Comité national pour la révision du procès Ranucci", there have been three review requests for the Ranucci trial, all being ultimately rejected, the Minister of Justice and afterwards the Commission de révision des condamnations pénales of the Court of cassation arguing each time that no new facts had proven Ranucci's innocence nor even cast doubt upon his guilt. It was stressed that arguments presented before the ministry of Justice and the Court of Cassation had already been cited previously by the defence during the criminal trial. Despite the creation of the association "Affaire Ranucci : Pourquoi réviser ?" by four Parisian students in 2002, there have been no further attempts to seek reconsideration since 1991 – the rejection date of the last request. Although some rumors circulated in 2006 about the presence of serial killer Michel Fourniret in Marseille area in 1974 and his assumed attendance of the Ranucci trial, Fourniret himself rectified saying he went to Marseilles region as a child and was working in Paris when the crime occurred; furthermore, an anthropometric study concluded that photographs taken at Ranucci's trial in 1976 of a man who seemed at a first sight to look like Fourniret, did not match pictures of the real Fourniret at that time.

On multiple occasions, former President of the Republic Giscard d'Estaing has said in interviews that he did not feel remorse regarding his role in the case; he mentioned to journalist Laurent Delahousse in 2010 that he did not regret his decision to decline clemency to Ranucci, claiming that he was indeed guilty and that "he had to be punished".

Héloïse Mathon died in March 2013. She was buried in the graveyard of Saint-Véran, Avignon, alongside her son's ashes which she had followed as they were transported from the graveyard Saint-Pierre in Marseille to graveyard Saint-Véran after his execution.

== Jean-Baptiste Rambla's murder cases ==
In February 2005, Jean-Baptiste Rambla, Marie-Dolorès' brother, was arrested during the investigation into the disappearance of 42-year-old Corinne Beidl, his employer. Rambla had killed her as a result of a violent dispute about his salary. He was convicted of her murder and sentenced to an 18-year prison term in October 2008. According to his lawyers, his behaviour was influenced by drug addiction and the media coverage surrounding the guilt of his sister's murderer.

After being paroled in early 2015, he was charged once more with the brutal murder of a 21-year-old woman committed in Toulouse in August 2017. His trial was postponed and home confinement was imposed in response to the coronavirus pandemic. Rambla was tried in Toulouse in December 2020 and sentenced to life imprisonment.
