= Hannele Klemettilä =

Finnish historian, medievalist and author (born 1966)

Hannele Klemettilä (Hannele Klemettilä-McHale; born 1966 in Helsinki, Finland) is a Finnish historian, medievalist, and author living in Manhattan, New York, and the medieval village of Sonning-on-Thames in the county of Berkshire. She studied cultural history at the University of Turku, earned a Ph.D. in medieval history from the University of Leiden in the Netherlands, and was a Postdoctoral Researcher of the Academy of Finland in 2008–2010. She is an adjunct professor of cultural history at the University of Turku, and a Life Member at the Clare Hall, University of Cambridge. She published Epitomes of Evil (Brepols 2006), and other books on late medieval cultural history. Her research interests include late medieval penal culture, representations of the executioner, Gilles de Rais, cooking and cookery books, conceptions of cruelty, medieval symbolism, attitudes to animals and nature.

== Selected bibliography ==
- The Executioner in Late Medieval French Culture. University of Turku 2003. ISBN 951-29-2538-9.
- Keskiajan pyövelit (Medieval Executioners). Atena 2004. ISBN 951-796-354-8.
- Ritari Siniparta: Gilles de Rais’n tarina. (Story of Gilles de Rais) Atena 2005. ISBN 951-796-395-5.
- Epitomes of Evil: Representations of Executioners in Northern France and the Low Countries in the Late Middle Ages. Brepols 2006. ISBN 2-503-52278-5.
- Keskiajan keittiö (Medieval Cuisine). Atena 2007. ISBN 978-951-796-493-7.
- Keskiajan julmuus (Cruelty in the Middle Ages). Atena 2008. ISBN 978-951-796-517-0.
- Keskaja köök. Varrak 2008. ISBN 978-9985-3-1749-5.
- Mansimarjasta punapuolaan. Marjakasvien kulttuurihistoriaa (Cultural History of Berries). Maahenki 2011. ISBN 978-952-5870-50-3.
- The Medieval Kitchen. A Social History with Recipes. London: Reaktion Books 2012. ISBN 978-186-1899-08-8.
- Federigon haukka ja muita keskiajan eläimiä. (Federigo's Falcon and Other Medieval Animals). Atena 2013. ISBN 978-951-796-883-6.
- Das Mittelalter-Kochbuch. Köln: Anaconda 2013. ISBN 978-3-7306-0028-3.
- Animals and Hunters in the Late Middle Ages. Evidence from the BnF MS fr. 616 of the Livre de chasse by Gaston Fébus. New York: Routledge 2015. ISBN 978-1-13-884233-5.
- 中世纪厨房. Shanghai: Shanghai Academy of Social Sciences, 2021. ISBN 978-7-5520-2978-9.
- 「図説」食材と調理からたどる中世ヨーロッパの食生活 : 王侯貴族から庶民にいたる食の世界、再 現レシピを添えて. Tokio: Hara Shobo, 2023. ISBN 978-4-562-07288-0.
- Kalman karamellit ja muita keskiajan murhatapauksia (Deadly Sweets and Other Medieval Murder Cases). Helsinki: Docendo, 2024. ISBN 978-952-382-991-6.
