= Philippe Maurice =

French criminal (born 1956)

Philippe Maurice (born June 15, 1956, in Paris) is a French criminal and academic, mostly famous for being sentenced to the guillotine for murder in 1980, and subsequently pardoned by president François Mitterrand in 1981. His sentence of death was the last confirmed throughout the French legal system, as well as the last person to receive an executive pardon from a death sentence in France. While imprisoned, Maurice became a historian, and currently specialises in Medieval history.

Maurice was condemned for the murder of a night-watchman and two police officers following a series of bank-robberies committed while already on the run for attempting to help his brother escape from jail. He had been flagged down by traffic police and escaped in a shootout, which ended in the death of two police officers and his passenger and accomplice. In the process in the cour d'assise of Paris, Maurice was defended by the noted anti-death penalty activist Robert Badinter. Even in the divided opinion, with no executions having been carried out in Paris since 1972, Maurice's crimes were infamous, and he was condemned to death on 24 October 1980. After appeal to the Cour de Cassation, the court refused to amend the verdict in the so-called pourvoi en cassation, on 18 March. Cassation was regular feature for harder verdicts in the cour d'assise, the only (civilian) court capable of imposing a death penalty. Because of this, Maurice's sentence is considered the last in the French legal system, as an appeal to the Court of Cassation was virtually obligatory (although in several cases, such as Jerome Carrein, the sentence would be quashed only to be re-imposed on retrial). Short of presidential grace, Maurice's sentence thus seemed slated to be carried out, a fact exacerbated after he injured a police officer by use of a gun smuggled in via his lawyer, Brigitte Hemmerlin. She was sentenced to five years and lost her lawyer's licence as a consequence.

This was the final death sentence to reach review by the Court of Cassation in France. After the victory of François Mitterrand and the Socialist Party in the April to June presidential and legislative elections, Badinter, handpicked for Minister of Justice, allegedly asked Maurice to refrain from further escape attempts, and four months later presented the bill for abolition before the National Assembly in September 1981. Maurice's sentence was commuted to life imprisonment on 25 May by president Mitterrand, four days after his swearing-in. A further of eight sentences of death were imposed after Maurice's; one died in custody, one was sentenced in his absence and never found, and six benefitted from an automatic pardon once the Senate ratified the law of abolition on the last of September.

Maurice received conditional liberty in 1999-2000 and has subsequently had an academic career, attached to the prestigious social studies school EHESS. His doctoral thesis was published in 1995, when still under a sentence of life imprisonment.
