= Elizabeth Sugrue =

Irish executioner

- Born: 1740/1750; County Kerry, Ireland
- Died: 1807; Roscommon, County Roscommon, Ireland
- Other name: Lady Betty
- Occupation: hangwoman
- Years active: 1789–1802

Elizabeth Sugrue (Irish: Éilis Uí Shiochrú; c. 1740/1750 – 1807), also known as Lady Betty, was an Irish executioner.

== Life ==
Born around 1750, Sugrue was left destitute after the death of her farmer husband. Evicted from her home, she set off with her two children on the long walk to the town of Roscommon. On the way, her younger child died of starvation and exposure, leaving only the elder, Pádraig.

According to William Wilde (1815–1876), who collected stories about her from locals, Elizabeth had a "violent temper" and Pádraig often threatened to leave home. Elizabeth begged him to stay, but in April 1775, following particularly harsh treatment, he departed; some sources claim he enlisted in the British Army, others he emigrated to British North America and joined the Continental Army.

After the departure of her son, Elizabeth became a recluse, taking in lodgers for a few pennies a night. She heard less and less from her son as time passed, and became increasingly bitter.

Supposedly, a man came to stay at her house in 1789 and she murdered him with the intention of stealing his possessions. On searching his possessions, she discovered that he was in fact her long-lost son. She is said to have lost her mind with despair. Her crime was discovered and she was arrested, convicted and sentenced to death. She was held in the gaol in the market square in Roscommon town.

On the day her death sentence was due to be executed, twenty-five others were also due to be hanged, including sheep and cattle thieves and ‘Whiteboys’, young men who tore down fences and hedges surrounding what had once been common land. On the day of her hanging, the hangman was ill. Betty volunteered to hang all of the others in exchange for her life being spared, allegedly after three others refused. She lived in the prison thereafter, carrying out executions and floggings, including a number of rebels executed during the 1798 Rebellion. She was known to draw portraits of the men and women she hanged on the wall of her lodgings with charcoal.

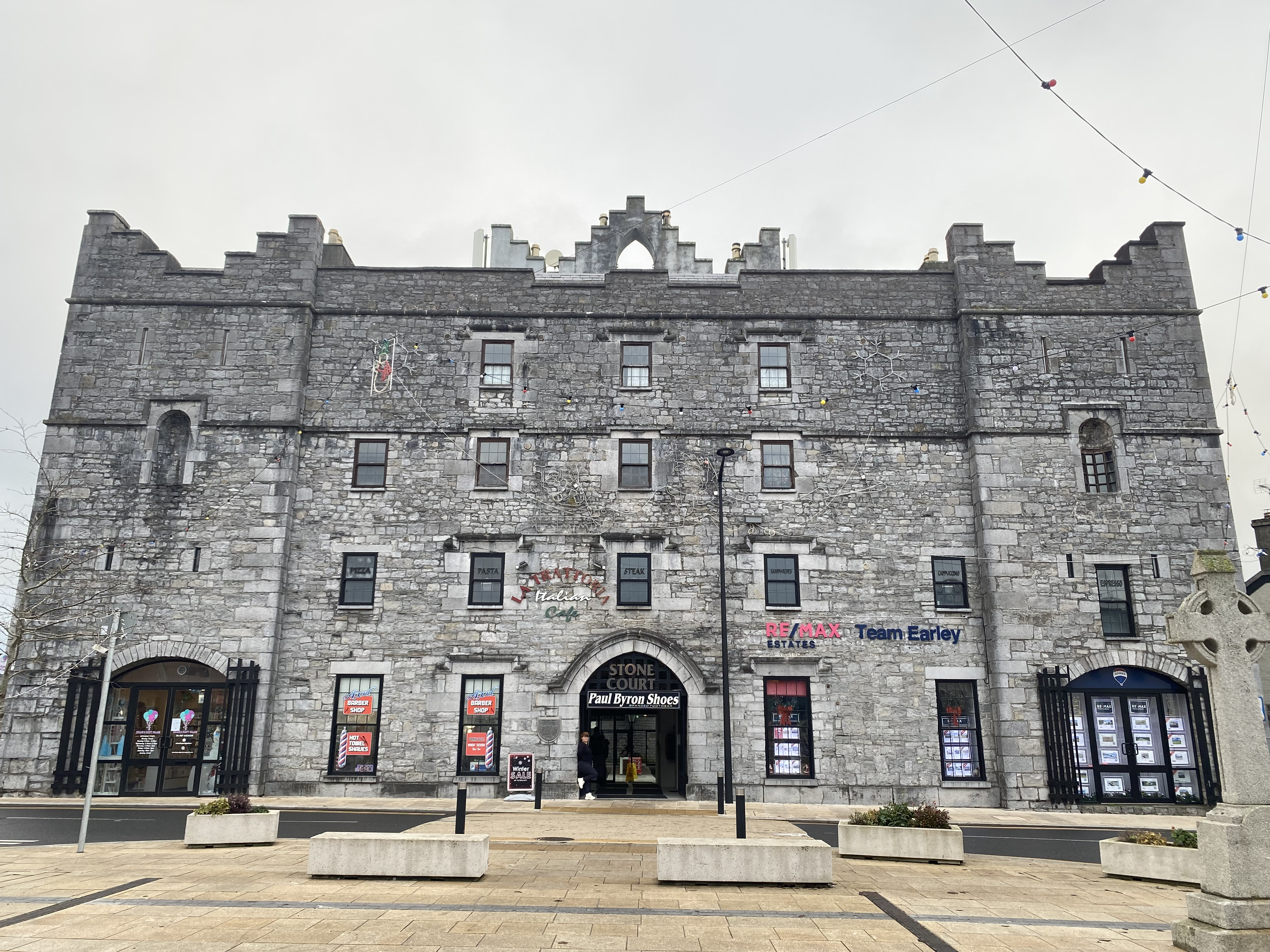
Roscommon Gaol

She was not the first hangwoman in Ireland, however; an unidentified woman hanged two men for murder on 13 November 1782 at Kilmainham. The men were also quartered. The sheriff received abuse for making a hangman of a woman.

In 1802, her own sentence was commuted, in recognition of her service to "the safety of the public".

Elizabeth died in 1807 and was buried in an unmarked grave inside the walls of Roscommon Gaol. The account held in the National Folklore Collection claims she was murdered by a prisoner.

== Popular culture ==
In 1884, an article on her written by Charlotte O'Conor Eccles appeared in the Weekly Irish Times. She is the centrepiece of a narrative poem by Áine Miller, titled "Betty Sugrue - Hangwoman; The Woman From Hell", and the main character in Declan Donnellan's 1989 play Lady Betty.

In 2021, a short animated film Lady Betty was produced by Irish production company Whackala. It was directed by Paul McGrath and starred Colm Meaney and David Pearse.

TG4 (Ireland) released a short Irish-language documentary on Elizabeth Sugrue in March 2026.
