= Executioner =

Person who executes a sentence of death

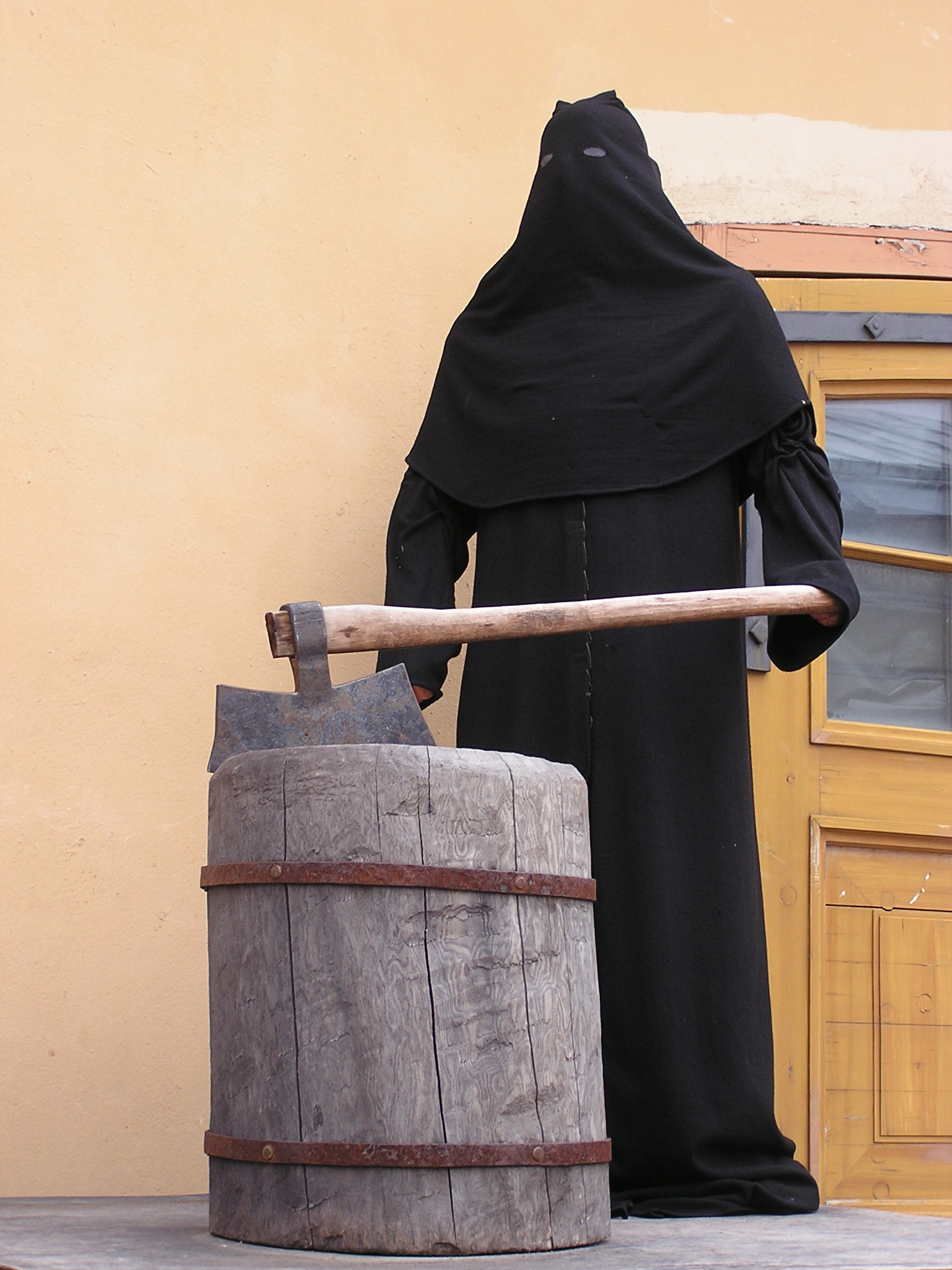
Symbolic robed figure of a medieval public executioner at Peter and Paul Fortress, Saint Petersburg, Russia

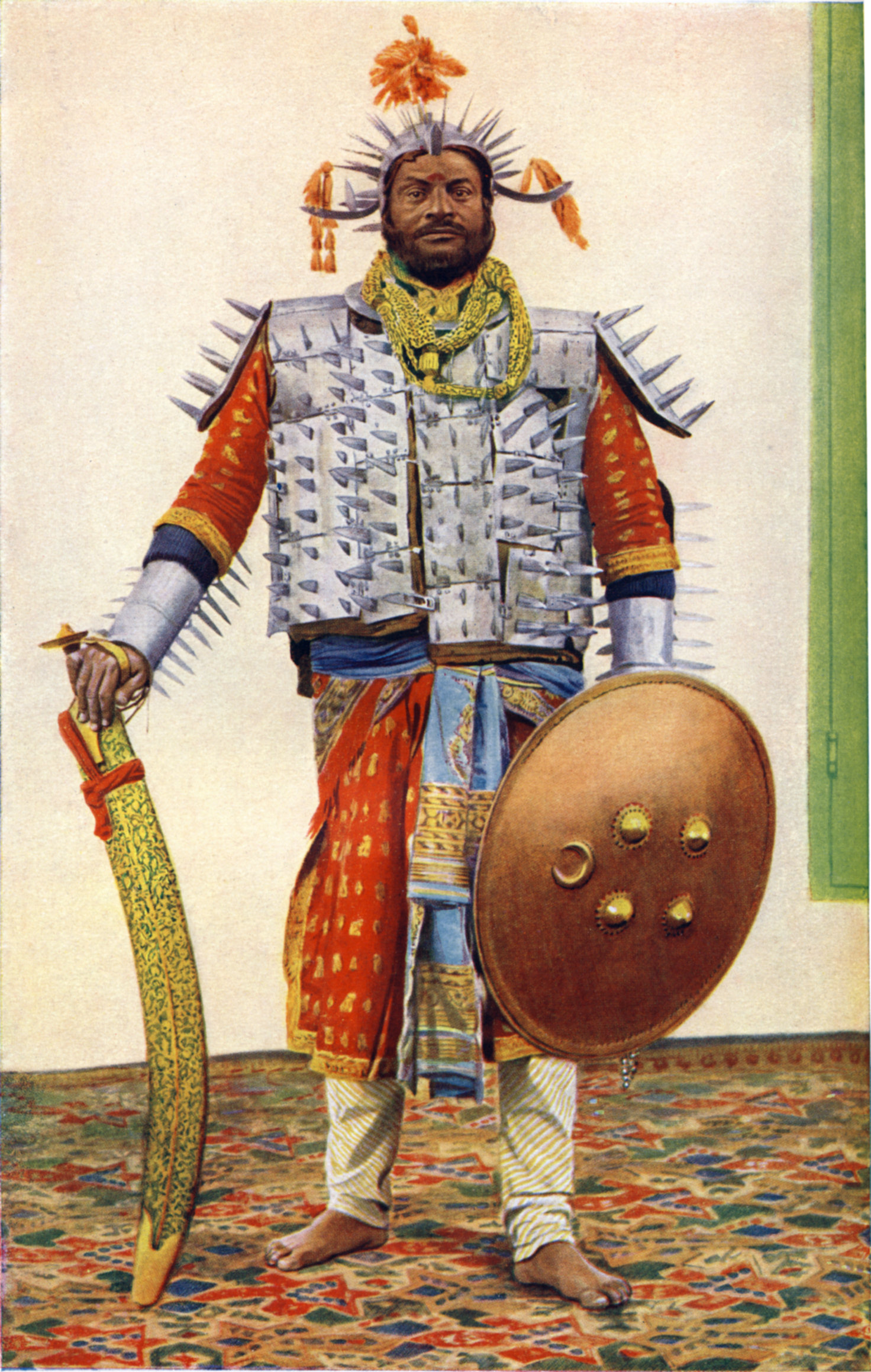
Photograph (hand-coloured), original dated 1898, of the lord high executioner of the former princely state of Rewah, Central India, with large executioner's sword (Tegha sword)

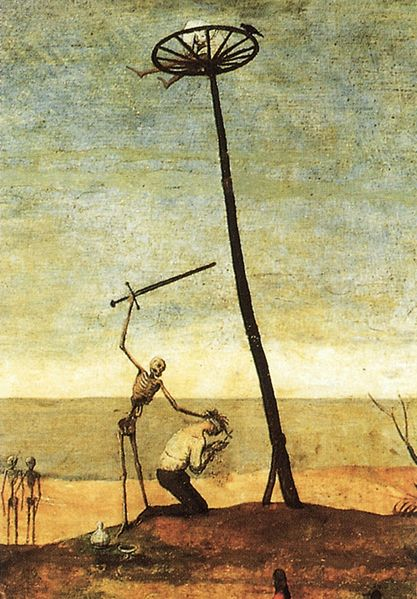
Depiction of a public execution in Brueghel's The Triumph of Death 1562–1563

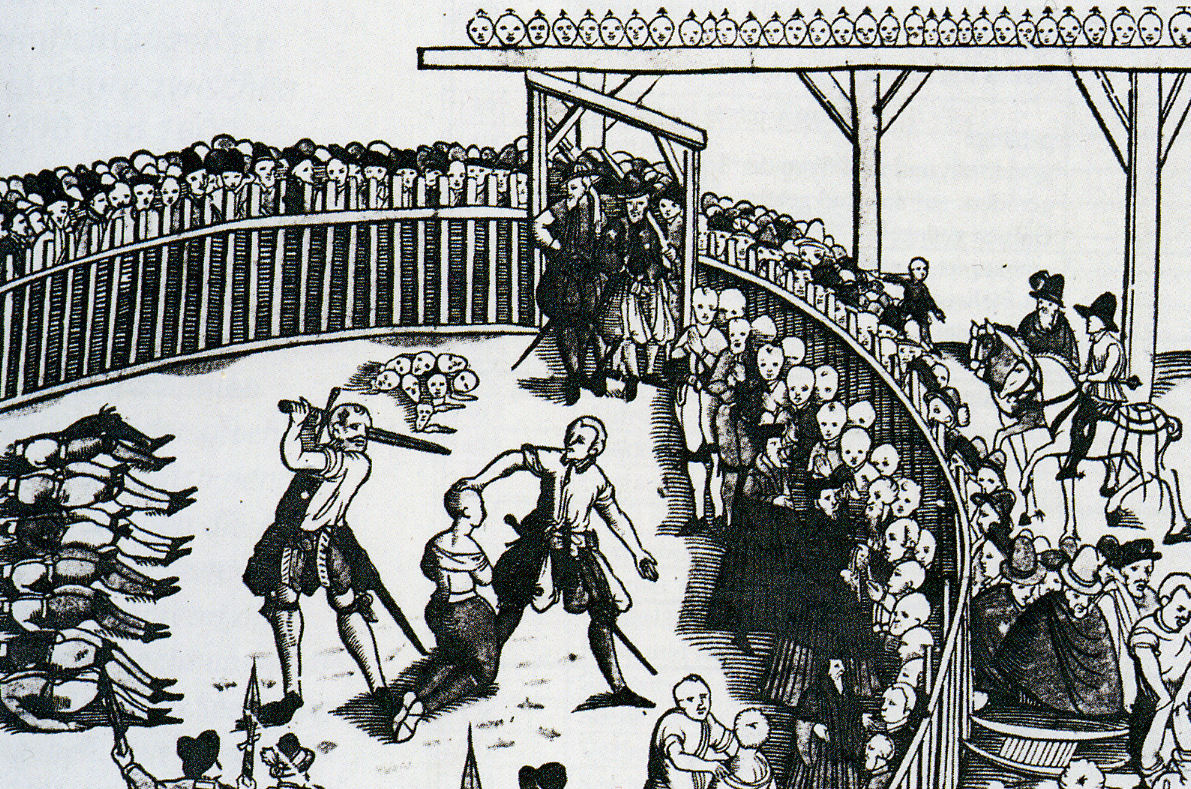
Stylised depiction of public execution of pirates in Hamburg, Germany, 10 September 1573

An executioner, also known as a hangman or headsman, is an official who effects a sentence of capital punishment on a condemned person.

== Scope and job ==
The executioner was usually presented with a warrant authorizing or ordering him to execute the sentence of death.

Many executioners were professional specialists who traveled a circuit or region performing their duty, because executions were rarely very numerous. Within this region, a resident executioner would also administer non-lethal physical punishments, or apply torture. In medieval Europe, to the end of the early modern period, executioners were often knackers, since pay from the rare executions was not enough to live off.

In medieval Europe executioners also taxed lepers and prostitutes, and controlled gaming houses. They were also in charge of the latrines and cesspools, and disposing of animal carcasses.

Executions in France (using the guillotine since the French Revolution) persisted until 1977, and the French Republic had an official executioner; the last one, Marcel Chevalier, served until the formal abolition of capital punishment in 1981.

== In society ==
In Western Europe and its colonies, executioners were often shunned by their neighbours, with their work as knackers also disreputable. In France, executioners and their families were ostracized and lived in social isolation. In Alexandre Dumas' The Three Musketeers and in the film La veuve de Saint-Pierre (The Widow of Saint-Peter), minor character executioners are ostracized by the villagers.

In early modern German society, executioners and their families were considered "dishonourable people" (unehrliche Leute).

The profession of executioner sometimes ran through a family, especially in France, where the Sanson family provided six executioners between 1688 and 1847 and the Deibler dynasty provided five between 1879 and its 1981 abolition. The latter's members included Louis Deibler, his son Anatole, Anatole's nephew Jules-Henri Desfourneaux, his other nephew André Obrecht, and André's nephew Marcel Chevalier.

In Britain, the most notable dynasty was the Pierrepoints, who provided three executioners between 1902 and 1956 – Henry, his brother Thomas, and Henry's son Albert. British executioners such as William Marwood, James Berry, Albert Pierrepoint, and Harry Allen were widely known and respected by the public.

In Korea, the Baekjeong were an "untouchable" group who traditionally performed the jobs of executioner and butcher. In Japan, executioners have been held in contempt as part of the Burakumin class (today executions in Japan are not carried out by professional executioners, but by prison guards). In Memories of Silk and Straw, by Junichi Saga, one of the families surveyed in the Japanese village of Tsuchiura is that of an executioner family ("The Last Executioner", p. 54). This family does suffer social isolation, even though the family is somewhat well-off financially.

In the Ottoman Empire, the role of executioners was given to the imperial guard, called bostanji (literally, "gardeners"). Senior officials who were sentenced to death were personally executed by the head of the guard (Turkish: bostancıbaşı). By the late 18th century, a custom had developed where grand viziers could avoid execution by racing the bostancibaşi to the Fish Market Gate, the traditional place of execution. If the deposed vizier reached the Fish Market Gate before the bostancibaşi, his sentence was commuted to mere banishment. But if the condemned man found the bostancibaşi waiting for him at the gate, he would be executed. The last recorded person to participate in a race with the bostancibaşi was grand vizier Hacı Salih Pasha who, in November 1822, outran the bostancibaşi and saved his life. He was so widely esteemed for winning the race that he got appointed governor general of the Damascus province. Executioners had their own graveyards, with uncarved and unpolished simple rough stones used as gravestones. The biggest of these graveyards is part of the Eyüp Cemetery in Istanbul.

The town of Roscommon has the distinction of having had Ireland's most notorious hangwoman, Lady Betty, who was given the post in exchange for her life being spared when the hangman due to execute her death sentence took ill on the day that she and 25 others were due to be hanged. Lady Betty offered to carry out the task in exchange for her death sentence being commuted to a life sentence, and she acted as the county's hangwoman from then on. An unidentified woman hanged two men for murder on 13 November 1782 at Kilmainham, near Dublin. The men were also quartered. The sheriff received abuse for making a hangman of a woman.

== See also ==
- List of executioners
- Scharfrichter
- Executioner's sword

== Gallery ==
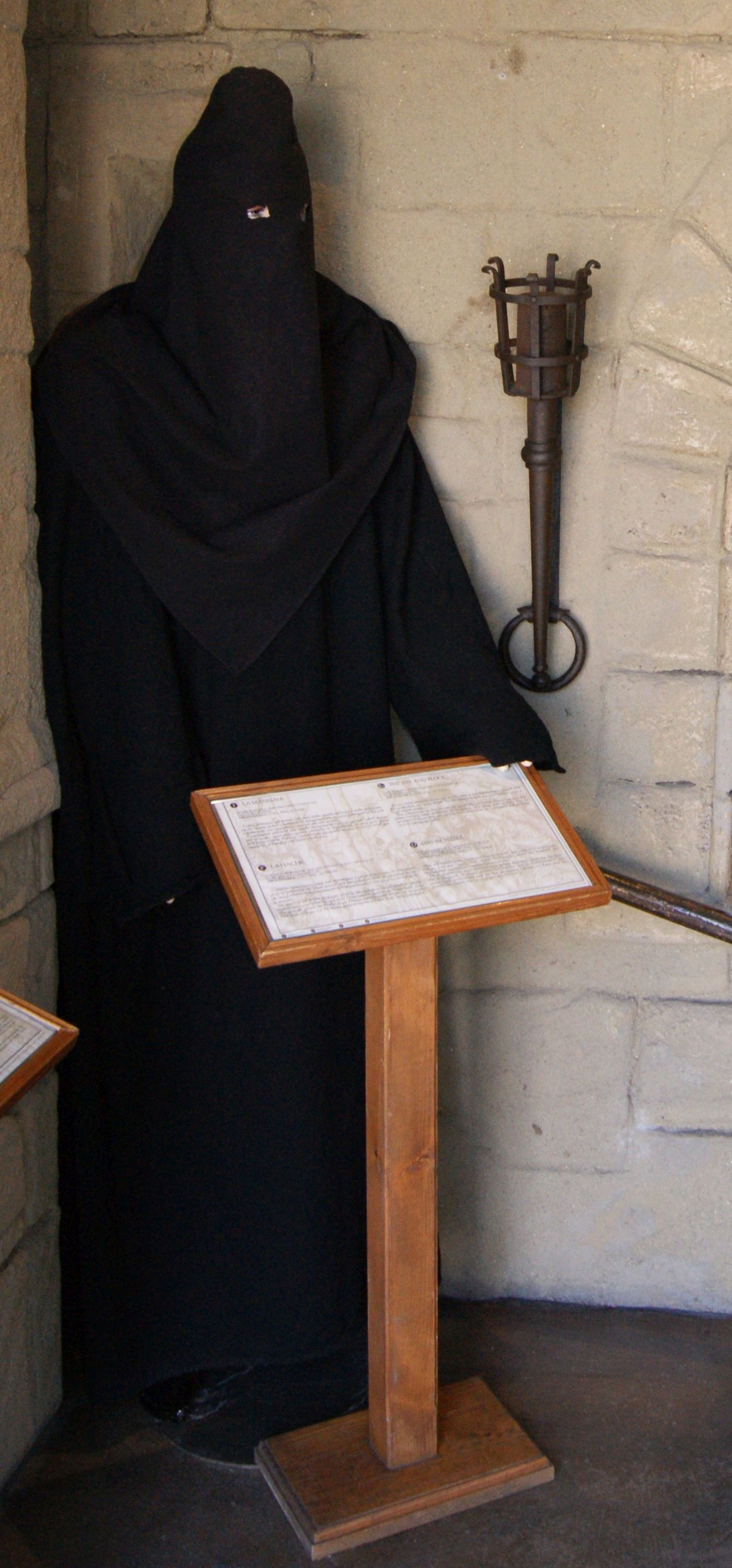
Robed figure of a medieval public executioner at the Museum of Torture in San Marino

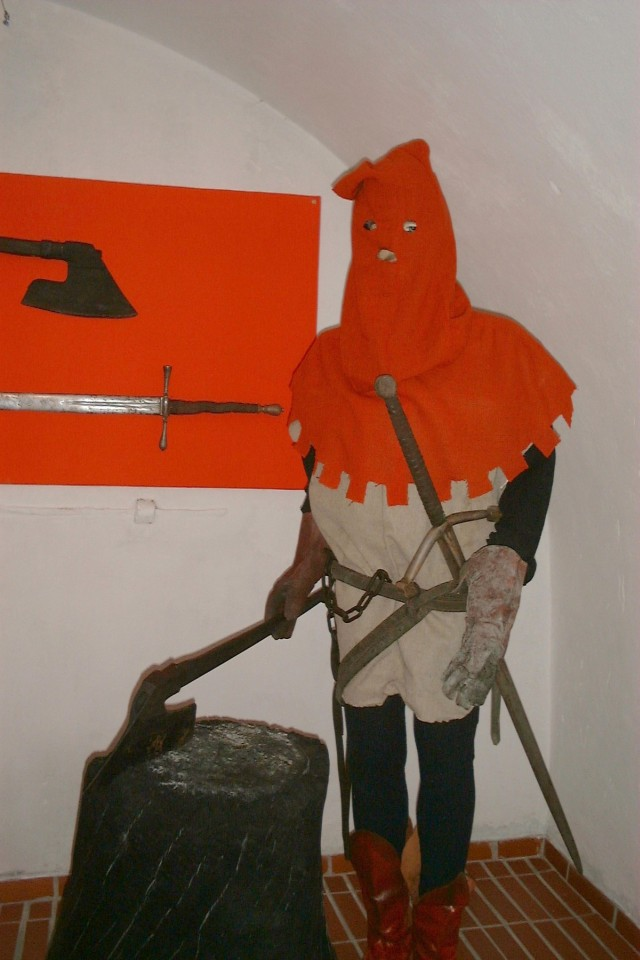
Robed figure of a medieval public executioner at the Museum of Torture, in Żywiec, Poland

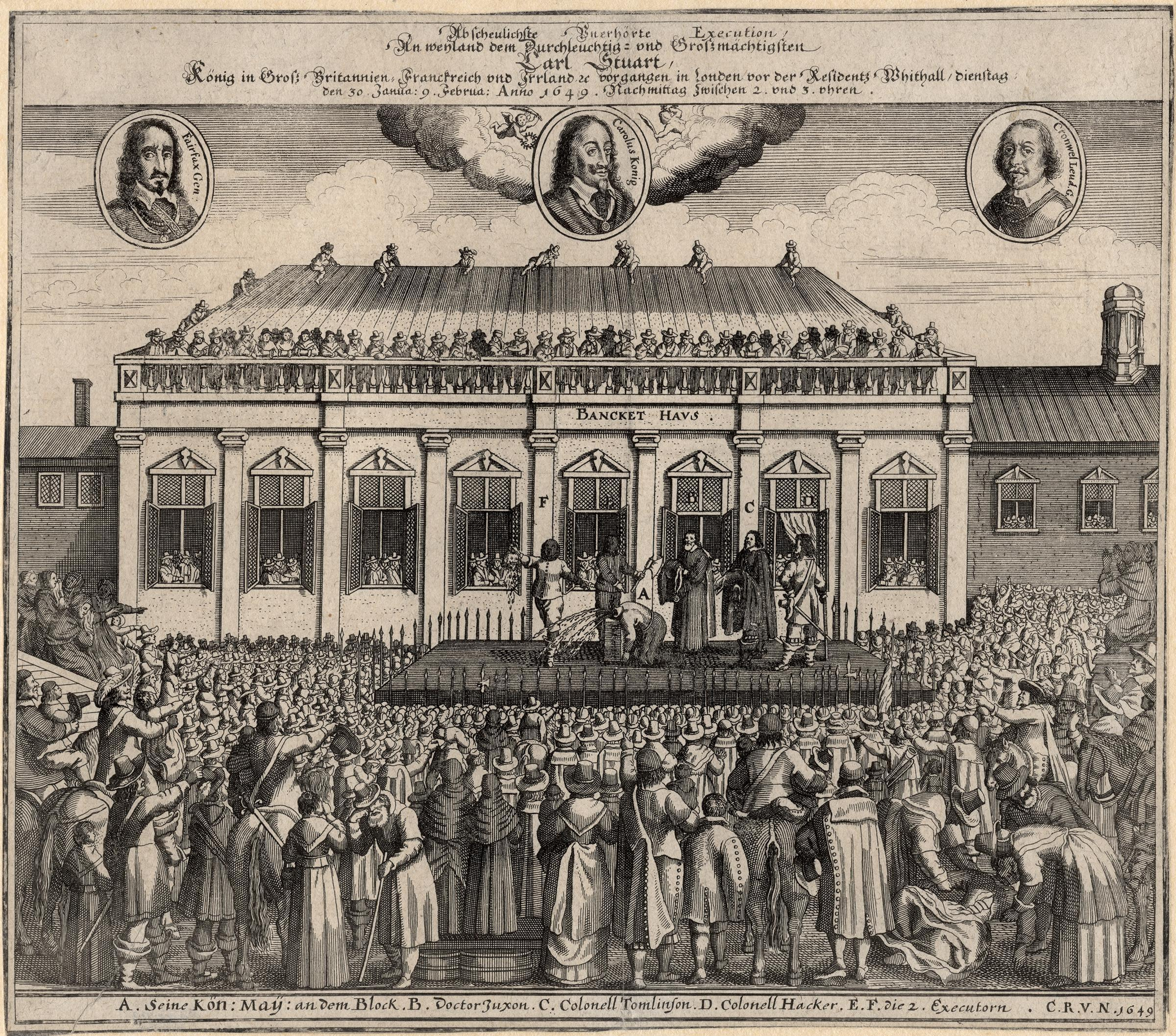
Print of Execution of King Charles I of England 1649; the executioner is masked

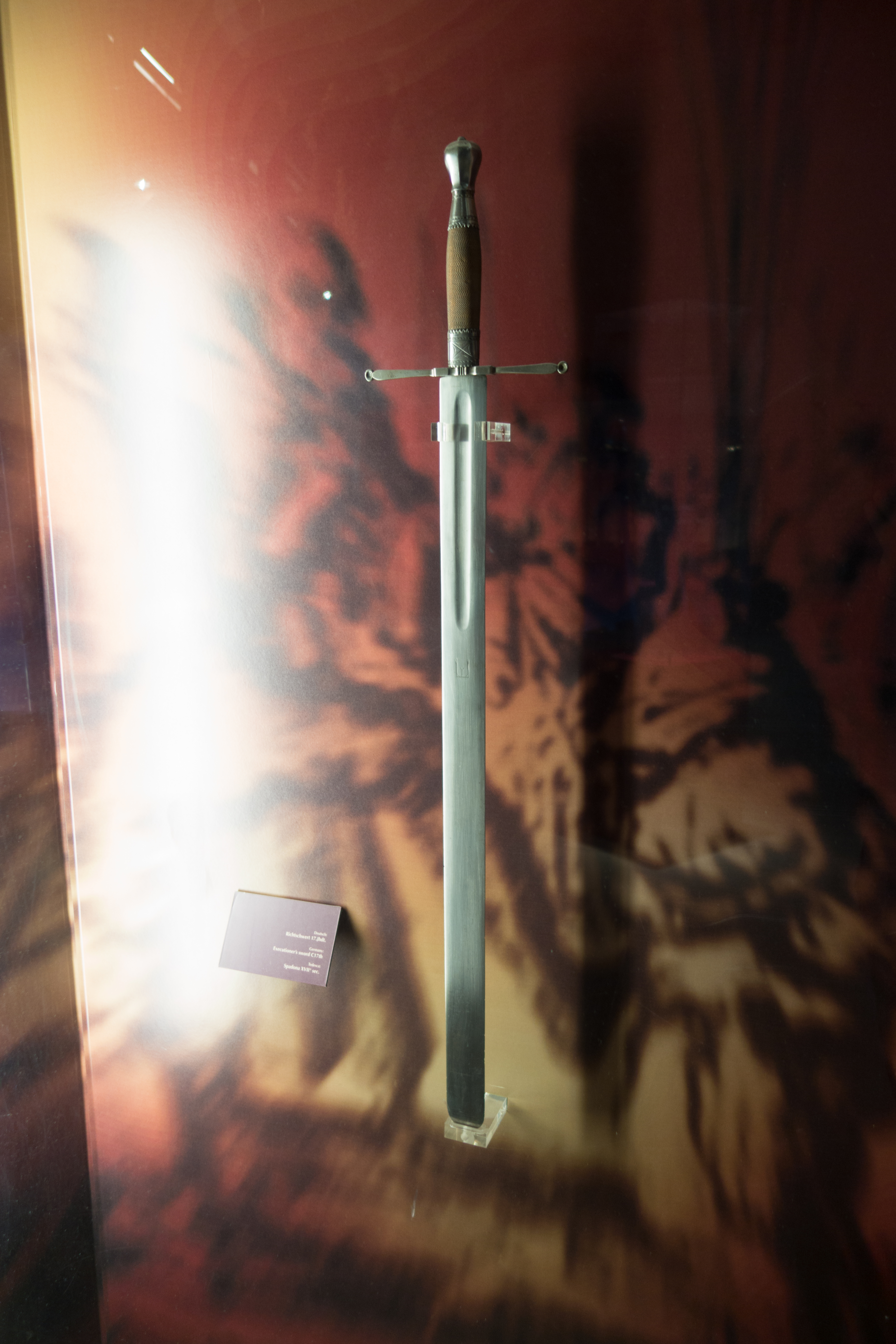
17th century executioner's sword, Germany ca. 1600

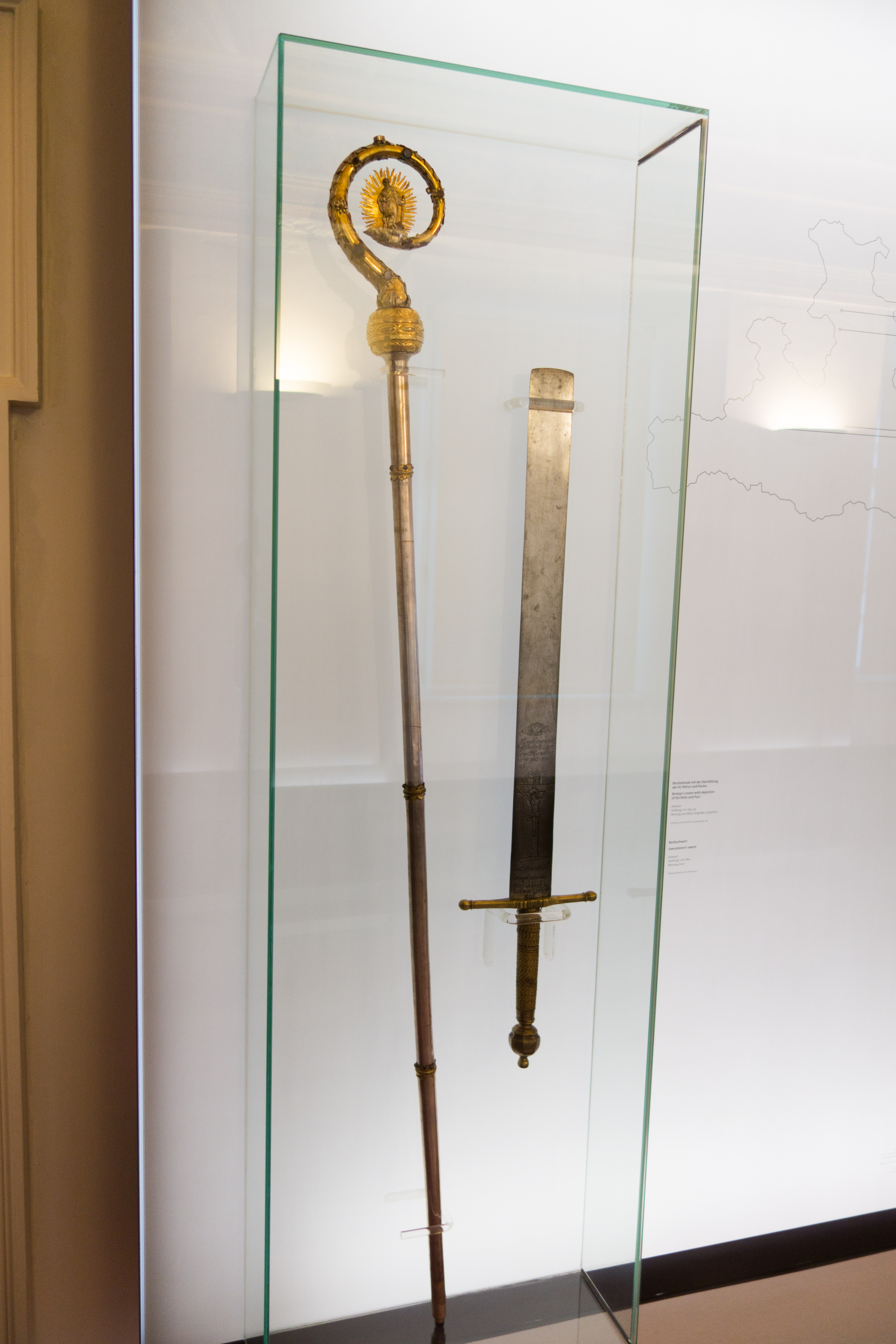
High Court Executioner's sword with Christian epigram, ca. 1760 Salzburg, Austria, on display next to a Bishop's staff. The executioner's sword is designed as a cutting weapon rather than stabbing, forged of brass and iron.

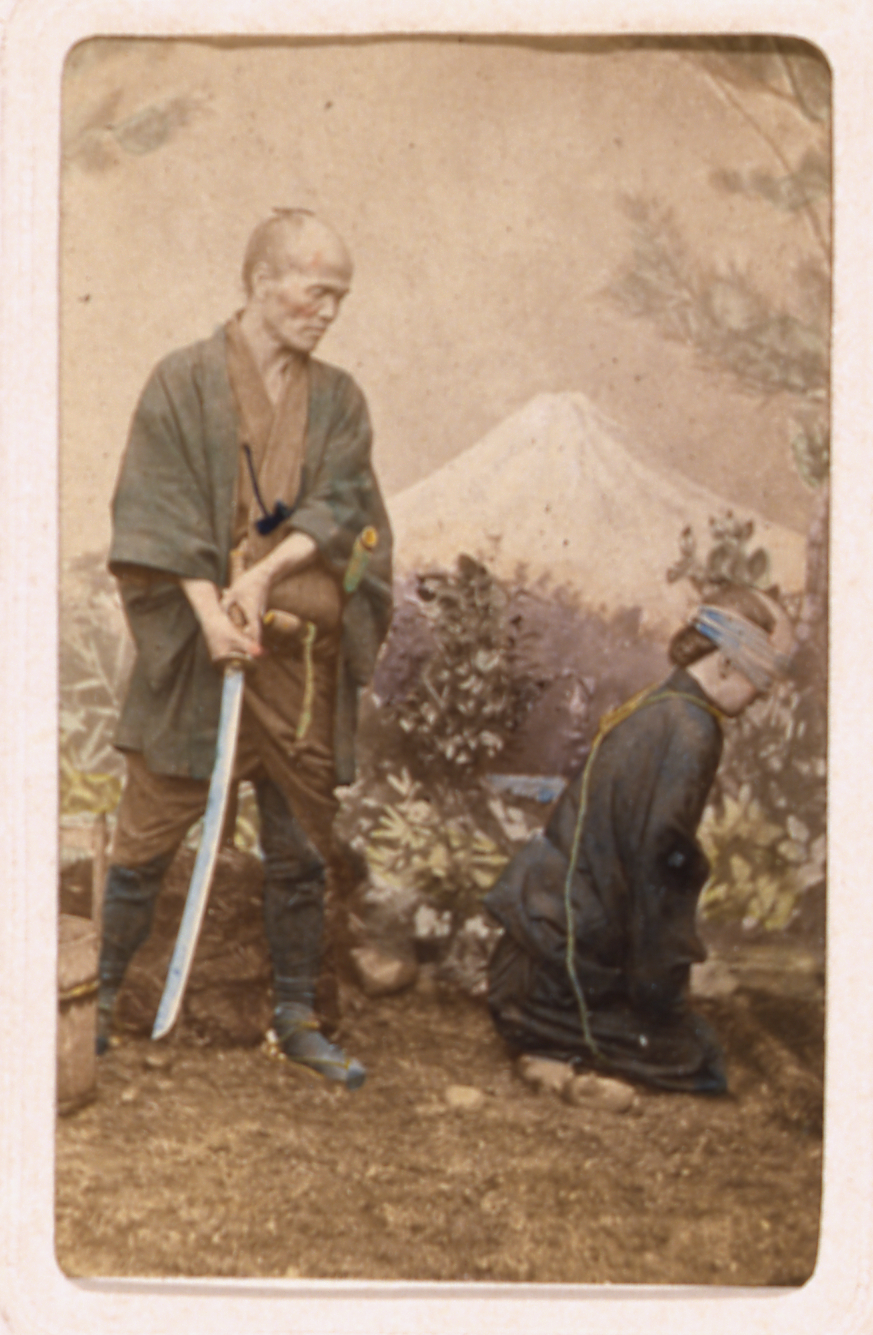
19th-century Japanese executioner with sword and prisoner.

== See also ==
- Outline of capital punishment
