= Robert Badinter =

French politician, lawyer and author (1928–2024)

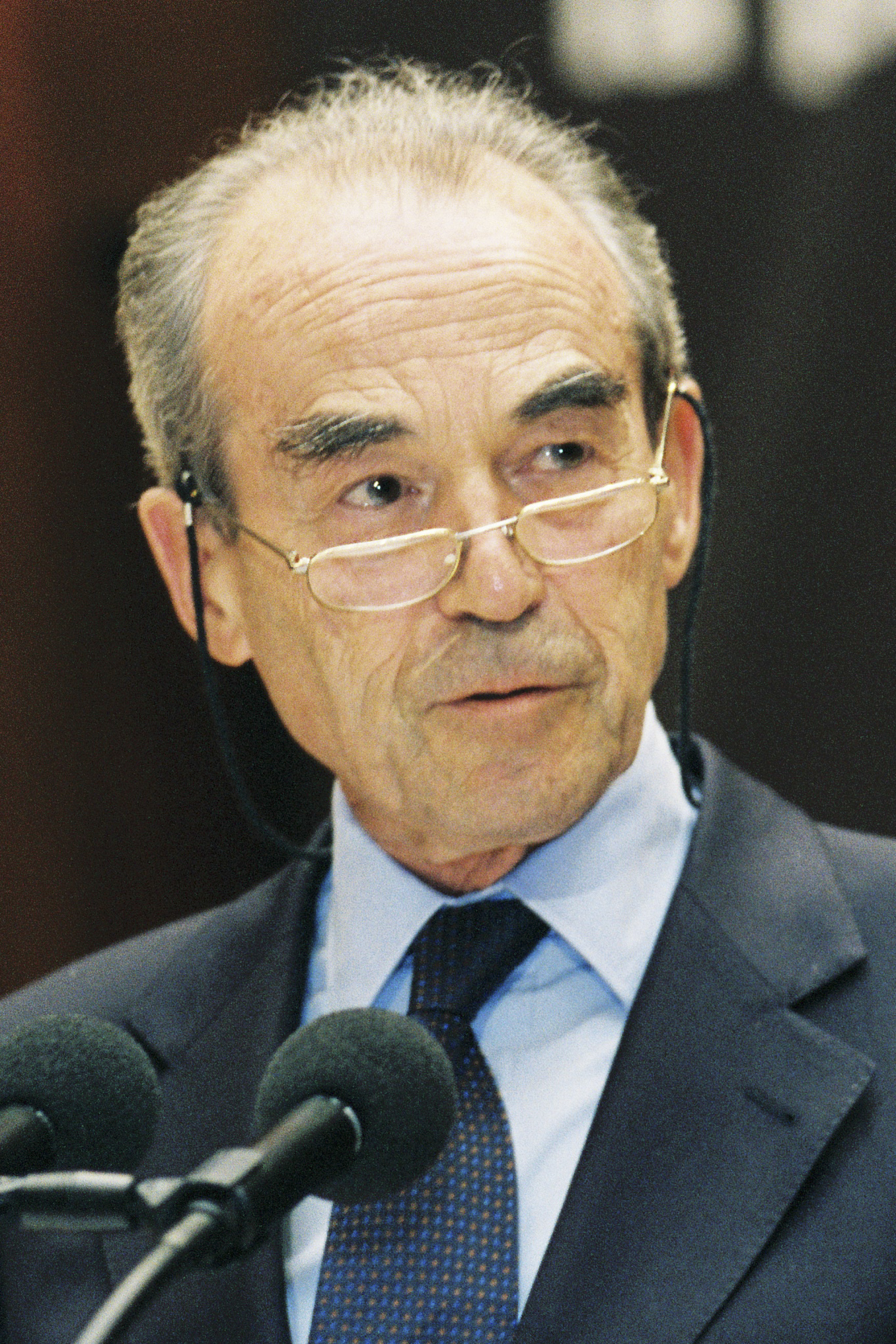
- Badinter in 2001

Senator
- In office 24 September 1995 – 30 September 2011
- Preceded by: Françoise Seligmann
- Succeeded by: Philippe Kaltenbach
- Constituency: Hauts-de-Seine

President of the Constitutional Council
- In office 4 March 1986 – 4 March 1995
- Appointed by: François Mitterrand
- Preceded by: Daniel Mayer
- Succeeded by: Roland Dumas

Minister of Justice
- In office 23 June 1981 – 19 February 1986
- President: François Mitterrand
- Prime Minister: Pierre Mauroy
- Preceded by: Maurice Faure
- Succeeded by: Michel Crépeau

Personal details
- Born: 30 March 1928 Paris, France
- Died: 9 February 2024 (aged 95) Paris, France
- Party: Socialist Party
- Spouse: Élisabeth Badinter
- Children: 3
- Education: University of Paris (LLB); Columbia University (MA)
- Occupation: Lawyer, professor, politician, activist

Robert Badinter (French pronunciation: [ʁɔbɛʁ badɛ̃tɛʁ]; 30 March 1928 – 9 February 2024) was a French lawyer, politician, and author who enacted the abolition of capital punishment in France in 1981, while serving as Minister of Justice under François Mitterrand. He also served in high-level appointed positions with national and international bodies working for justice and the rule of law.

== Early life ==
Robert Badinter was born on 30 March 1928, in Paris to Simon Badinter and Charlotte Rosenberg. His Bessarabian Jewish family had immigrated to France in 1921 to escape pogroms. During World War II, after the Nazi occupation of Paris, his family sought refuge in Lyon, then near Chambéry after his father was captured by the Gestapo in the 1943 Rue Sainte-Catherine Roundup. Simon was then deported with other Jews to the Sobibor extermination camp, where he was murdered shortly thereafter.

Badinter graduated in law from Paris Law Faculty of the University of Paris. He then went to the United States to continue his studies at Columbia University in New York City, where he got his MA. He continued his studies again at the Sorbonne until 1954. In 1965, Badinter was appointed a professor at University of Sorbonne. He continued as an Emeritus professor until 1996.

== Political career ==
=== Beginnings ===
Badinter started his career in Paris in 1951, as a lawyer working with Henry Torrès. In 1959, he was hired by transgender cabaret star Coccinelle to help her legally change her gender. In 1965, along with Jean-Denis Bredin, he founded the law firm Badinter, Bredin et partenaires, (now Bredin Prat) where he practised law until 1981.

=== The Bontems case ===
Badinter's activism against capital punishment began after Roger Bontems's execution on 28 November 1972. Along with Claude Buffet, Bontems had taken a prison guard and a nurse hostage during the 1971 revolt in Clairvaux Prison. While the police were storming the building, Buffet slit the hostages' throats. The jury sentenced both men to death. Badinter served as defense counsel for Bontems and was outraged by the sentence. After witnessing the executions, Badinter dedicated himself to the abolition of capital punishment.

=== Capital punishment ===
In this context, he agreed to defend Patrick Henry. In January 1976, eight-year-old Philippe Bertrand was kidnapped. Henry was soon picked up as a suspect, but released because of a lack of evidence. He gave interviews on television, saying that those who kidnapped and killed children deserved death. A few days later, he was arrested again and shown Bertrand's corpse hidden in a blanket under his bed. Badinter and Robert Bocquillon defended Henry, making the case not about Henry's guilt, but against a death sentence. Henry was sentenced to life imprisonment and died months after a compassionate release from prison in 2017 (after receiving parole in 2001, revoked in 2002). The lenient verdict came as a shock, with several publications having already called the outcome as a virtual certainty for execution; according to speculative sources, the critical vote on the death sentence failing by a seven-to-five vote majority. The case of Jerome Carrein, condemned 15 days after Henry's sentence for the murder of a child, was widely dubbed the "revenge of the guillotine". Until the execution of Gary Gilmore in Utah on 17 January, three days before Henry's verdict, France was the only Western liberal democracy actively performing executions.

Despite president Valéry Giscard d'Estaing's modernist outlook and stated opposition to the guillotine, a further three executions took place during this period, of Christian Ranucci in July 1976, Carrein in June 1977, and Hamida Djandoubi in September 1977. Badinter took no part in arguing either case. However, 63% of French voters supported keeping the death penalty at the time it was abolished. In 1980-81, Badinter defended Philippe Maurice, whose sentence of death was confirmed by the superior court in March 1981, weeks before the election of abolitionist François Mitterrand to President. A further eight sentences of death were issued before the bill of abolition was passed by the French parliament in September (the last only two days before the Senate voted) but none reached stage of execution and were converted by the abolition act. Maurice's sentence, after lobbying from Badinter, was commuted by Mitterrand on May 25, among Mitterrand's first acts as president.

=== Ministerial mandate (1981–1986) ===
In 1981, François Mitterrand, a self-professed opponent of the death penalty, was elected president and Badinter was appointed as Minister of Justice. Among his first actions was to introduce a bill to Parliament proposing the abolition of the death penalty for all crimes, both civilian and military. The bill was passed by the Senate after heated debate on 30 September 1981. On 9 October the law was officially enacted, ending capital punishment in France.

During his mandate, he also helped abolish "juridictions d'exception" ("special courts"), such as the Cour de Sûreté de l'État ("State Security Court") and the military courts, worked to make conditions in French prisons more humane, and improved the rights of victims of crime. Badinter also played a key role in equalizing France’s age of consent for gay sex, which previously had been set at 21 years (as opposed to 15 for heterosexual sex.)

During the trial of Nazi war criminal Klaus Barbie, whose crimes included authorizing the deportation of thousands of Jews—including Badinter’s father, Simon—to extermination camps, Badinter insisted that Barbie be housed at the Montluc prison, where Barbie himself had ordered the torture and killing of detainees. Barbie had previously been sentenced to death in absentia, but the abolition of the death penalty in France meant that he received a life sentence instead, which Badinter approved of, describing the sentence as “a true victory for civilization.”

He remained a minister until February 1986.

=== 1986–2024 ===
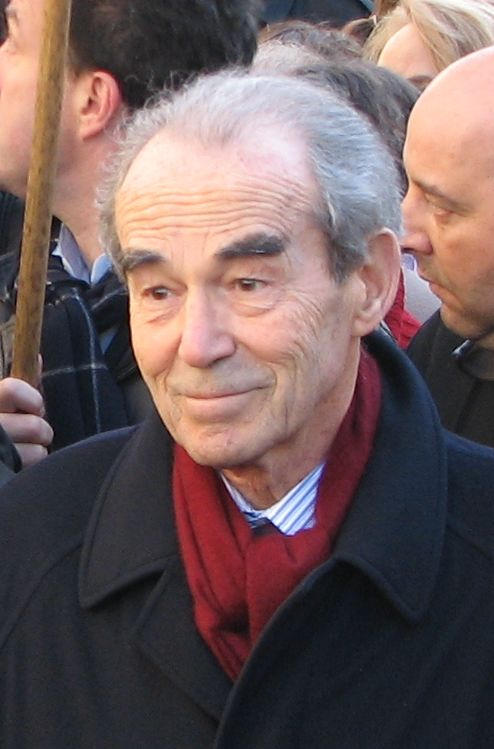
Badinter in 2007

From March 1986 to March 1995, he was president of the French Constitutional Council. From 1995 to 2011, he served as a senator, representing the Hauts-de-Seine département.

In 1989, he participated in an edition of the Antenne 2 talk show Apostrophes devoted to human rights, together with the 14th Dalai Lama. Discussing the disappearance of Tibetan culture from Tibet, Badinter used the term "cultural genocide". He praised the example of Tibetan nonviolent resistance. Badinter met with the Dalai Lama many times, in particular in 1998 when he greeted him as the "Champion of Human Rights", and again in 2008.

In 1991, Badinter was appointed by the Council of Ministers of the European Community as a member of the Arbitration Commission of the Peace Conference on Yugoslavia. He was elected as president of the commission by the four other members, all presidents of constitutional courts in the European Community. The Arbitration Commission has rendered eleven pieces of advice regarding "major legal questions" arising from the split of the Socialist Federal Republic of Yugoslavia.

Badinter was the first president of the Court of Conciliation and Arbitration of the Organization for Security and Co-operation in Europe (OSCE) following its creation in 1995; he served in that position until 2013.

Badinter opposed the accession of Turkey to the European Union, on the grounds that Turkey might not be able to follow the rules of the Union. He was also concerned about the nation's location, saying: "We'll have, we Europeans, common borders with Georgia, Armenia, Iran, Iraq and Syria. I am asking you: What justifies our common borders with these countries? What justifies that we'd get involved in the most dangerous areas of the world?"

As a head of the Arbitration Commission, he gained high respect among Macedonians and other ethnic groups in the Republic of Macedonia because he recommended "that the use of the name 'Macedonia' cannot therefore imply any territorial claim against another State". He supported full recognition of the Republic in 1992. He was involved in drafting the so-called Ohrid Agreement in the Republic of Macedonia. This agreement was based on the principle that ethnic-related proposals passed by the national assembly (and later to be applied to actions of city councils and other local government bodies) should be supported by a double majority of both Macedonian and Albanian ethnic groups. This is often called the "Badinter principle".

In 2009, Badinter expressed dismay at the Pope's lifting of the excommunication of controversial English Catholic bishop Richard Williamson, who had expressed Holocaust denial and was illegally consecrated a bishop. The Pope reactivated the excommunication later.

Badinter was elected to the American Philosophical Society in 2009.

=== World Justice Project ===
Badinter served as an Honorary Co-Chair for the World Justice Project. It works to lead a global, multidisciplinary effort to strengthen the rule of law for the development of communities of opportunity and equity.

=== Case of Dominique Strauss-Kahn ===
At the start of the case of Dominique Strauss-Kahn in 2011, in which the IMF Managing Director was accused of rape and was arrested by the police in New York City, Robert Badinter reacted by saying to France Inter that he was outraged by the "media killing" and denounced the "failure of an entire system" inherent in the perp walk of Strauss-Kahn, a suspect, but also of the media judging an assumed culprit's guilt for charges that had not initiated a trial, and which were eventually dismissed. Strauss-Kahn had been a favoured Socialist candidate for the presidential election the following April, but dropped all pretences of running after his arrest.

== Personal life and death ==
Badinter married philosopher and feminist writer Élisabeth Bleustein-Blanchet, daughter of Marcel Bleustein-Blanchet, who was the founder of Publicis, a multinational advertising and public relations company, in 1966. He died in Paris during the night of 8 to 9 February 2024, at the age of 95. President Macron later announced Badinter would be honored with burial in the Panthéon.

== Awards ==
Badinter refused any honorary distinction from the National Order of the Legion of Honor (as did his wife) and the Ordre National du Mérite. He nevertheless received foreign decorations, notably the Order of Tomáš Garrigue Masaryk (Czech Republic) in 2001. and the Order 8-September (North Macedonia) in 2006. As a longstanding activist for the abolition of the death penalty, Robert Badinter was appointed an honorary member of the International Commission Against the Death Penalty. He was awarded the International Abolition Award by Death Penalty Focus in 2023.

== Summary of political career ==
Political appointments:
- President of the Constitutional Council: 1986–1995.
- Minister of Justice: 1981–1986 (resigned upon appointment as president of the Constitutional Council).
Elected office:
- Senator for Hauts-de-Seine: 1995–2011. Elected in 1995, reelected in 2004.

== Bibliography ==
- L'exécution (1973), about the trial of Claude Buffet and Roger Bontems
- Condorcet, 1743–1794 (1988), co-authored with Élisabeth Badinter.
- Une autre justice (1989)
- Libres et égaux : L'émancipation des Juifs (1789–1791) (1989)
- La prison républicaine, 1871–1914 (1992)
- Un antisémitisme ordinaire (1997)
- L'abolition (2000), recounting his fight for the abolition of the death penalty in France
- Une constitution européenne (2002)
- Le rôle du juge dans la société moderne (2003)
- Contre la peine de mort (2006)
- Les épines et les roses (2011), on his failures and successes as Minister of Justice

Political offices
Preceded by Maurice Faure	Minister of Justice; 1981–1986	Succeeded by Michel Crépeau
Legal offices
Preceded by Daniel Mayer	President of the Constitutional Council; 1986–1995	Succeeded by Roland Dumas
