= Jérôme Carrein =

French murderer (1941–1977)

- Jérôme Carrein, probably in the mid-1970s
- Born: 2 July 1941; Cantin, Nord, France
- Died: 23 June 1977 (aged 35); Douai Prison, Nord, France
- Cause of death: Execution by guillotine
- Other name: "The swamp choker"
- Convictions: Murder with aggravating circumstances (12 July 1976 & 1 February 1977)
- Penalty: Death (12 July 1976 & 1 February 1977)

Details
- Victims: Cathy Petit, 8
- Date: 27 October 1975
- Locations: Arleux (kidnapping); Palluel (murder and attempted rape)
- Date apprehended: 27 October 1975

Jérôme Henri Carrein (French pronunciation: [ʒeʁom ɑ̃ʁi kaʁɛ̃]; 2 July 1941 – 23 June 1977) was the second-to-last convicted criminal to be executed by guillotine in France.

On 27 October 1975 in Arleux, Northern France, Carrein, who was the father of five children and often had no fixed abode, an alcoholic, and a tuberculosis sufferer, met Cathy Petit, an eight-year-old local girl. She was the daughter of the owner of a bar that Carrein frequented. Carrein enticed the girl to follow him into nearby marshlands to search for fish bait, dispatching the girl's brother Éric to report to their mother. Cathy and Carrein walked up to the swamps of Palluel (Pas-de-Calais). Having arrived there, Carrein attempted to rape the child before strangling and drowning her.

Carrein was arrested the next day and quickly confessed to his crime. He was tried before the Pas-de-Calais criminal court at Saint Omer, found guilty, and sentenced to death on 12 July 1976.

Carrein appealed against his sentence and was retried on 1 February 1977 at the criminal court in Douai. Two weeks before the second trial began, Patrick Henry, another child murderer, narrowly escaped a death sentence at the criminal court in Troyes thanks to the skill of his lawyer, Robert Badinter, and public outrage in France was particularly strong. Carrein was found guilty again and sentenced to death a second time.

Carrein's mercy petition was turned down in mid-June 1977 by President Valéry Giscard d'Estaing. Carrein was guillotined by Marcel Chevalier at 04:30 on 23 June 1977 in the yard of Douai prison. Only one other convicted criminal, Hamida Djandoubi, remained to face the guillotine.

== General references ==
- Article from La Voix du Nord (in French)
