= Hamida Djandoubi =

Tunisian murderer (1949–1977)

- Djandoubi being escorted to his trial at the Cour d'assises d'Aix-en-Provence, February 1977
- Born: 22 September 1949; Tunis, French Tunisia
- Died: 10 September 1977 (aged 27); Baumettes Prison, Marseille, France
- Cause of death: Execution by guillotine
- Resting place: Cimetière Saint-Pierre, Marseille
- Other name: "Pimp Killer"
- Motive: Revenge for previous criminal charges
- Convictions: Murder with aggravating circumstances Procuring; Rape (2 counts); Premeditated violence (3 counts)
- Penalty: Death (25 February 1977)

Details
- Victims: Élisabeth Bousquet, 21
- Date: Early 1973 (procuring) – 3 July 1974 (murder)
- Locations: Marseille; Lançon-Provence
- Date apprehended: 11 August 1974

Hamida Djandoubi (Arabic: حميدة جندوبي, romanized: Ḥamīda Jandūbī; 22 September 1949 – 10 September 1977) was a Tunisian criminal who was executed by guillotine in France after having been convicted of the kidnapping, torture and murder of Élisabeth Bousquet, a 21-year-old woman whom he had forced into prostitution. Djandoubi was the last person to be executed in France before the abolition of capital punishment in 1981, and the last person to be lawfully executed by beheading anywhere in the Western world.

== Early life ==
Born in Tunisia on 22 September 1949, Djandoubi started living in Marseille in 1968, where he worked in a grocery store. He later worked as a landscaper but had a workplace accident in 1971: his leg got caught in the tracks of a tractor, resulting in the loss of two-thirds of his right leg.

== Allegation of forced prostitution ==
In 1973, a 21-year-old woman named Élisabeth Bousquet, whom Djandoubi had met in the hospital while recovering from his amputation, filed a complaint against him, stating that he had tried to force her into prostitution.

== Murder of Élisabeth Bousquet ==
After his arrest and eventual release from custody during the spring of 1973, Djandoubi drew two other young girls into his confidence and then forced them into prostitution for him. On 3 July 1974, he kidnapped Bousquet and took her into his home where, in full view of the terrified girls, he beat the woman before stubbing a lit cigarette all over her breasts and genital area. Bousquet survived the ordeal so he took her by car to the outskirts of Marseille and strangled her there.

On his return, Djandoubi warned the two girls to say nothing of what they had seen. Bousquet's body was discovered in a shed by a boy on 7 July 1974. One month later, Djandoubi kidnapped and raped a 15-year-old girl named Houria. She managed to escape and report him to police.

== Trial and execution ==
After a lengthy pre-trial process, Djandoubi eventually appeared in court in Aix-en-Provence on charges of torture-murder, rape, and premeditated violence on 24 February 1977. His main defence revolved around the supposed effects of the loss of his leg six years earlier, which his lawyer claimed had driven him to a paroxysm of alcohol abuse and violence that had turned him into "a different man".

On 25 February, he was sentenced to death. An appeal was rejected 9 June. On 10 September 1977, Djandoubi was informed early in the morning that, as in the child murderers cases of Christian Ranucci (executed on 28 July 1976) and Jérôme Carrein (executed on 23 June 1977), he had not received a reprieve from President Valéry Giscard d'Estaing. Shortly afterwards, at 4:40 a.m., Djandoubi was executed by guillotine at Baumettes Prison in Marseille. Marcel Chevalier served as chief executioner.

While Djandoubi was the last person executed in France, he was not the last condemned. Fifteen defendants were sentenced to die before capital punishment was abolished in France on 9 October 1981, following the election of François Mitterrand, and those previously sentenced had their sentences commuted. Djandoubi's death was the last time any Western nation carried out an execution by beheading, as well as the most recent government-sanctioned guillotine execution in the world.

== See also ==
- Nicolas Jacques Pelletier, the first person to be executed by guillotine in France in 1792, during the French Revolution.
- Eugen Weidmann, the last person to be publicly executed by guillotine in France in 1939.
