= Nicolas Jacques Pelletier =

French highwayman (c. 1756 – 1792)

- Born: c. 1756
- Died: 25 April 1792 (aged 35–36); Hôtel de Ville, Paris, Kingdom of the French
- Occupation: Highwayman
- Known for: First person to be executed by guillotine

Nicolas Jacques Pelletier (c. 1756 – 25 April 1792) was a French highwayman who was the first person to be executed by guillotine.

== Robbery and subsequent sentencing ==
Pelletier routinely associated with a group of known criminals. On the night of 14 October 1791, with several unknown accomplices, he attacked a passerby in the rue Bourbon-Villeneuve in Paris and stole his wallet and several securities. During the robbery, he also killed the man, though this is disputed in later literature as possibly just having been an assault and robbery or also an assault, robbery and rape. He was apprehended and accused that same night, for the cries for help alerted some in the city, and a nearby guard arrested Pelletier. Judge Jacob Augustin Moreau, the district judge of Sens, was to hear the case.

A legal advisor was given to Pelletier, but despite his efforts and calls for a fairer court hearing, the judge ordered a death sentence for 31 December 1791. On 24 December, the second criminal court confirmed Judge Moreau's sentence. However, the execution was stayed, after the National Assembly made decapitation the only legal method of capital punishment. Pelletier waited in jail for more than three months as a guillotine was built in Strasbourg under the direction of the surgeon Antoine Louis, at a cost of 38 livres. Meanwhile, the public executioner Charles Henri Sanson tested the machine on corpses in the Bicêtre Hospital. Sanson preferred the guillotine over the former decapitation by sword, as the latter reminded him of the nobility's former privileges that the revolutionaries had worked to eliminate.

On 24 January 1792, a third criminal court confirmed the sentence. The execution was delayed due to the ongoing debate on the legal method of execution. Finally, the National Assembly decreed on 23 March 1792 in favour of the guillotine.

== Execution ==
The guillotine was placed on top of a scaffold outside the Hôtel de Ville in the Place de Grève, where public executions had been held during the reign of King Louis XV. Pierre Louis Roederer, thinking that a large number of people would come to see the first-ever public execution-by-guillotine, thought that there might be difficulty in preserving order. He wrote to General Lafayette to ask for National Guardsmen to make sure the event went smoothly.

The execution took place at 3:30 pm. Pelletier was led to the scaffold wearing a red shirt, the typical attire for someone convicted of murder. The large crowd predicted by Roederer was already there waiting, eager to see the novel invention at work. The guillotine, which was also red in color, had been previously fully prepared, and Sanson moved quickly. Within seconds, the guillotine and Pelletier were positioned correctly, and Pelletier was decapitated.

The crowd, however, was dissatisfied with the guillotine. They felt it was too swift and "clinically effective" to provide proper entertainment, as compared to previous execution methods, such as hanging, death-by-sword, or breaking at the wheel. The public even called out "Bring back our wooden gallows!"

== Aftermath ==
Pelletier was the first person to be executed by guillotine. After the establishment of the Revolutionary Tribunal on 10 August, the guillotine was moved to the Tuileries Palace. Executions were held either at the Place du Carrousel before the palace or the Place de la Révolution beyond its garden. The Revolutionary Tribunal executed just 28 people; the vast majority were for violent crimes like Pelletier's, unlike the subsequent Reign of Terror.

== See also ==
- Hamida Djandoubi, the last person to be executed by guillotine in France in 1977.

== Notes ==
=== References ===
- Abbott, Jeffery (2007). What a Way to Go. New York: St. Martin's Griffin. p. 144. ISBN 978-0-312-36656-8. "Nicolas Jacques Pelletier."
- Bernard, Jean (1885). Georges Maurice (ed.). Les lundis révolutionnaires: histoire anecdotique de la révolution française (in French). Maurice.
- Chase's Calendar of Events 2007. New York: McGraw-Hill. 2007. p. 291. ISBN 978-0-07-146818-3. "Nicolas Jacques Pelletier."
- Fleischmann, Hector (1908). La guillotine en 1793: d'après des documents inédits des Archives nationales (in French). Librairie des Publications Modernes.
- Goncourt, Edmond de; Jules Alfred Huot de Goncourt (1854). Histoire de la société française pendant la révolution (in French) (2 ed.). E. Dentu.
- Hatin, Eugène (1861). Histoire politique et littéraire de la presse en France: avec une introduction historique sur les origines du journal et la bibliographie générale des journaux depuis leur origine (in French). Poulet-Malassis et De Broise.
- Lenotre, G. (1910). La guillotine et les executeurs des arrets criminels pendant la revolution, d'apres des documents inedits tires des archives de l'etat. Perrin et cie.
- Sanson, Henri Clément (1863). Sept générations d'exécuteurs 1688–1847: Mémoires des Sanson mis en ordre (in French). Dupray de la Mahérie.
- Scurr, Ruth (2007). Fatal Purity. New York: H. Holt. ISBN 978-0-8050-8261-6.
- Seligman, Edmond (1901). La Justice en France pendant la Révolution (1789–1792) (in French). Plon-Nourrit et cie.
- Tuetey, Alexandre (1892). Répertoire général des sources manuscrits de l'histoire de Paris pendant la révolution française (in French). Imprimerie nouvelle.
