= Patrick Henry (murderer) =

French criminal (1953–2017)

- Henry interviewed by French television shortly before his second arrest in February 1976
- Born: Patrick Daniel Henry; 31 March 1953; Troyes, France
- Died: 3 December 2017 (aged 64); Lille, France
- Occupations: Travelling salesman Printer and publisher
- Convictions: Murder with aggravating circumstances (1977); Drug trafficking (in possession of 10 kg of cannabis) (2003)
- Penalty: Life imprisonment (20 January 1977); Returned to his life prisoner condition, 4-year term, €20,000 fine and the confiscation of money he had with him (around €8,000) (22 July 2003)

Patrick Daniel Henry (31 March 1953 – 3 December 2017) was a French criminal and cause célèbre and the subject of public and judicial controversy. He was convicted of the kidnapping and murder of the eight-year-old Philippe Bertrand in January 1976.

== Trial and sentencing ==
Henry's trial began on 18 January 1977, and he was defended by Robert Bocquillon and Robert Badinter. A contentious issue in the trial was the validity of capital punishment in France; Badinter, a fervent supporter of its abolition, ultimately convinced the jury not to execute his client. Reportedly, the final vote of the jury was 7-5, or one vote short, in favour of death. The case is said to have had an influence in leading to the abolition of capital punishment in France in 1981. Henry was subsequently sentenced to life imprisonment and was paroled in 2001; however, he returned to prison two years later after being caught trying to smuggle drugs into France. He was subsequently denied parole multiple times before finally succeeding and being released from prison on medical grounds on 15 September 2017.

== Death ==
Henry died of lung cancer in Lille, aged 64, on 3 December 2017, less than three months after his release from prison.
