= Saïb Hachani =

French serial killer (1929–2014)

- Born: Saïb Hachani; 1936
- Died: 22 March 1966 (aged 29–30); Lyon, France
- Other name: "Saïb le Rouge"
- Status: Executed
- Conviction: Murder x3
- Penalty: Death sentence

Details
- Victims: 3
- Span of crimes: 16 November 1962 – 13 February 1963
- Country: France
- Date apprehended: February 1963

Saïb Hachani (1936 – 22 March 1966) was a French serial killer who operated in the Loire department in 1962 and 1963 and was executed by guillotine.

== Biography ==
Saïb Hachani presented himself as a smuggler for Algeria.

=== Murders ===
On 16 November 1962, he killed Mohamed Hadji with an axe in order to steal 1,450 francs from him. He had promised to take him to Algiers. On 8 December, he killed Nedjaï Amhed with a meat cleaver before stealing his money. He then stabbed him in the chest with a red-hot poker before hiding him in a sack of coal. The body was found by a stray dog. On 13 February 1963, he murdered a rag-and-bone man, Messaoud Bouguerry, with a pickaxe handle before burning his body. The body was eventually found by a group of children. Following this crime, Hachani was arrested and confessed to the three murders. He was charged with murder and placed in pre-trial detention.

=== Trial and execution ===
The three murders were linked by the police. Saïb Hachani appeared before the Assize Court of Saint-Étienne on 28 and 29 October 1965. In order to defend him, his lawyer took advantage of the aftermath of the Algerian War and invented a political-terrorist conspiracy. On 29 October, he was sentenced to death punishment. Indifferent to his fate, he was executed by the executioner André Obrecht on the morning of 22 March 1966. He was the last person to be executed in Lyon.

== See also ==
- List of French serial killers
