= Hobday =

Hobday is a surname. Notable people with the surname include:

- Alfred Charles Hobday (1870–1942), English viola player
- Charles Hobday (1917–2005), English poet
- Claude Hobday (1872–1954), English double bass player
- Ethel Hobday (1872–1947), Irish pianist
- Sir Frederick Hobday (1869–1939), President of the Royal Veterinary College
- Sir Gordon Hobday (1916–2015), scientist and businessman
- Jimmy Hobday (born 1951), English lawn and indoor bowler
- Justin Hobday (born 1963), South African golfer
- Peter Hobday (footballer) (born 1961), English footballer
- Peter Hobday (presenter) (1937–2020), BBC presenter
- Ralph Hobday (1899–1975), designer of the Brookwood Memorial
- Ruth Hobday, New Zealand publisher, of Blackwell & Ruth
- Simon Hobday (1940–2017), South African golfer
- William Armfield Hobday (1771–1831), British portrait painter
