= Bonnaud (surname) =

Bonnaud is a surname. Notable people with the surname include:

- Frédéric Bonnaud (born 1967), head of the Cinémathèque française and French journalist
- Jacques Philippe Bonnaud or Bonneau (1757–1797), French military officer
- Robert Bonnaud (1929–2013), French historian
- Jacques Jules Bonnaud (1740–1792), martyred Haitian-French priest

== See also ==
- Bonneau, surname
- Bonnot, surname
- Christian Bonaud (1957–2019), French Islamologist
