= Violin Sonata No. 1 (Brahms) =

1879 composition by Johannes Brahms

- Regen
- by Johannes Brahms
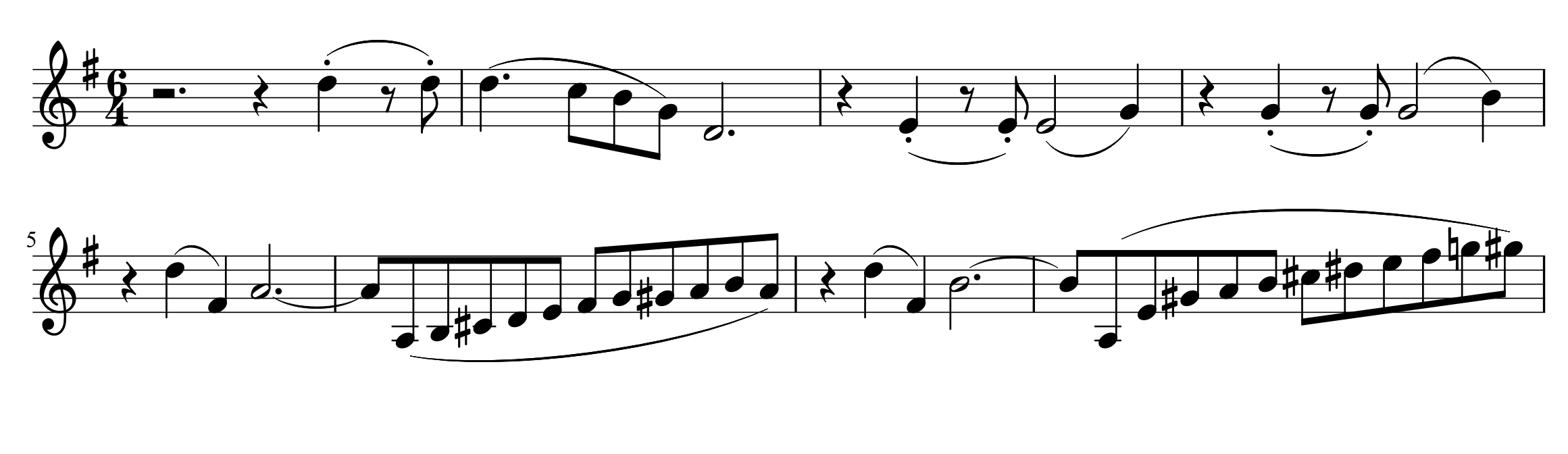
- The opening violin part
- Key: G major
- Opus: 78
- Composed: 1878–1879, Pörtschach am Wörthersee
- Movements: 3
- Scoring: Violin and piano

Premiere
- Date: 8 November 1879
- Location: Bonn
- Performers: Robert Heckmann, Marie Heckmann-Hertig

The Violin Sonata No. 1 in G major, Op. 78, Regensonate, the first of three such works for violin and piano, was composed by Johannes Brahms during the summers of 1878 and 1879 in Pörtschach am Wörthersee. It was first performed on 8 November 1879 in Bonn, by the husband and wife Robert Heckmann (violin) and Marie Heckmann-Hertig (piano).

The autograph manuscript of the sonata is preserved in the Wienbibliothek im Rathaus.

== Structure ==
External audio
- Performed by Josef Suk and Julius Katchen
- I. Vivace ma non troppo
- II. Adagio
- III. Allegro molto moderato

Each of the three movements of this sonata shares common motivic ideas or thematic materials from the principal motif of Brahms's two songs "Regenlied" and "Nachklang", Op. 59, and this is why this sonata is also called the "Rain Sonata" (Regensonate).

The first movement, Vivace ma non troppo is written in sonata form in G major; the second movement, Adagio – Più andante – Adagio, is an expanded ternary form in E♭ major, and the third movement, Allegro molto moderato is a rondo in G minor with coda in G major. The dotted rhythm motif from the two songs is not only directly quoted as a leading theme in the third movement of this sonata but also constantly appearing as fragmented rhythmic motif throughout all three movements of the sonata so that the entire sonata has a certain coherency. The rhythm of the rain motif appearing in the middle section of the second movement is adapted to a funeral march. The two disruptive appearances of the main theme of the Adagio in the third movement also represent cyclic form used in this sonata.

== Transcriptions ==
Brahms arranged the sonata (in D major) for cello and piano. Others have also arranged it for cello and piano, including Paul Klengel (published by N. Simrock in 1897) and Laszlo Varga (cello part only). Arrangements for viola and piano have also been made, including by Leonard Davis, Csaba Erdélyi, and Thomas Riebl.
