= Albert Browne-Bartroli =

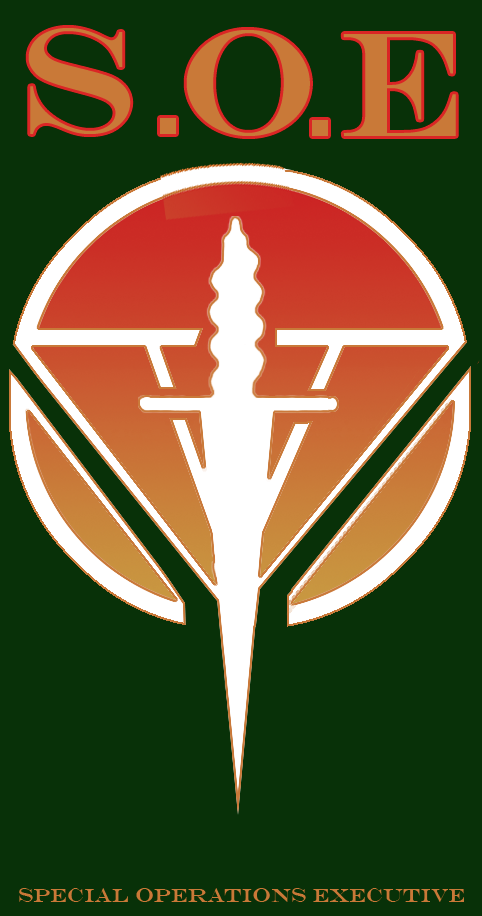

Albert James Browne-Bartroli (1915-1967), code name Tiburce, was an agent of the clandestine British Special Operations Executive (SOE) during World War II. The purpose of SOE was to conduct espionage, sabotage, and reconnaissance in countries occupied by Nazi Germany or other Axis powers. SOE agents allied themselves with resistance groups and supplied them with weapons and equipment parachuted in from England. Browne-Bartroli was the organiser (leader) of SOE's Ditcher Network in eastern France. He arrived by parachute in France in October 1943 and developed and supplied with arms and equipment a large and strong resistance movement against the German occupation. After D-Day, the resistance forces he helped launched many successful attacks on transportation infrastructure to hinder the German response to the Allied invasion of France. Browne-Bartroli was awarded the DSO and the Croix de Guerre for his wartime service.

== Family and early life ==
Albert Browne-Bartroli, nicknamed Toto, was born on 29 August 1915 in Marseille. He was the son of businessman Eugene H. L. Browne, who was English, and Elisa Francesca Bartroli, who was Catalan. He had an older brother, Henry (died in 1937), and a younger sister, Eliane. Eliane was also an SOE agent and was captured and executed by the Germans.

Albert's father, Eugene, was improvident and in 1936, his wife asked for a divorce and took her three offspring with her to Leicester, England. Albert studied chemical engineering and worked for a paint company. He was described as "a chemist with a penchant for poetry." In 1939 he took a job in Madrid, joining his mother who had moved back to Spain. In 1941, Albert returned to Britain to join the Royal Air Force. He probably came to the attention of SOE because he spoke fluent French and Spanish.

== SOE ==
Browne-Bartroli and Ditcher operated mostly south of Chalon-sur-Saône.

Browne-Bartroli entered wartime France on the night of 20/21 October 1943 via a clandestine flight on a Lockheed Hudson airplane that landed in a field north east of Angers. He was designated to establish and lead the Ditcher network, located in the Burgundy region. Browne-Bartroli would mostly operate in the neighborhood of the city of Chalon-sur-Saône.

Browne-Bartroli's task was to organize maquis groups to attack German railroads and roads to hinder the German response to an Allied invasion of France (which occurred on 6 June 1944). Three resistance groups, called maquis, existed, two of 50 men each and one of 100 men. Initially, Browne-Bartoli's task was to expand and supply the resistance so that it could be an effective tool of hindering the German response to the forthcoming Allied invasion. Among the things he lacked, was a competent wireless operator for communication with SOE in London. He appointed Jean Renaud, who had escaped from a German concentration camp, as his deputy.

Browne-Bertroli visited his sister Eliane in Marseille for the New Year holiday. That violated SOE rules that agents should avoid contact with each other. While in Marseille, the two of them participated in a successful operation to blow up several locomotives. That was the last time the brother and sister met before she was captured and executed.

As the date for the invasion of Europe approached, SOE rushed to reinforce its networks in France. On the night of 8/9 April 1944, Canadian Jean-Paul Archambaud (code named Chico) parachuted into France. He was charged with organizing the resistance in Ain Department. Another Canadian, Guy D'Artois (code named Dieudonne) parachuted into France on 23/24 May. With D'Artois was Joseph Gerard Litalien, a 17-year old American who became the all-important wireless operator of the Ditcher network. Litalien's French was poor so Browne-Bartoli assigned him an escort and kept him away from populated areas. He sent D'Artois to organize the maquis in Charolles.

=== After D-Day ===
Browne-Bartroli had armed and equipped 200 maquis who began small scale sabotage of rails and roads immediately after the Allied invasion on 6 June 1944. The many different maquis groups throughout France were loosely collected and organized as the French Forces of the Interior (FFI) adhering to the leadership of Charles de Gaulle. From a few dozen canisters of weapons and equipment dropped by parachute before D-Day, the air drops of arms and equipment increased to dozens of canisters monthly then to more than five hundred. Browne-Bertoli and his operatives armed about 3,000 maquis as new volunteers came forward and the means to train and equip them increased. From a massive air drop of weapons on 14 July, Browne-Bartroli armed 300 men of the communist Francs-Tireurs et Partisans (FTP), one of the maquis groups competing for arms from the SOE. With another large arms drop in early August, he declined to supply the FTP as they refused to fight in cooperation with the FFI. Browne-Bartroli and other SOE agents also avoided contact with the right-wing Armée secrète.

The Germans struck back on August 11, attacking the maquis near the city of Cluny with a force estimated at 3,000 men with air support. The maquis helped by Browne-Bartroli and Guy D'Atois managed to fend off the Germans killing (they claimed) 400 and capturing much equipment at a cost of 12 maquis killed and part of the town damaged by bombing. Cluny was the first successful successful defense of a city in the region.

In early September 1944, allied armies captured the Burgundy region. Their work done, SOE called its agents, including Browne-Bartroli, to Paris and arranged their return to England.

== After the war ==
Browne-Bartroli received the Distinguished Service Order (DSO) from the British government and the Croix de Guerre from the French government. He died in Madrid in 1967. In 2006, a plaque was placed in Ameugny in honor of Browne-Bartroli and his wireless operator, Joseph Litalien, and the large parachute drop of arms to the Maquis which occurred on 14 July 1944.
