= Canister filter =

Canister filter may refer to various types of filter in different systems:

- Canister-styled aquarium filters
- Canister filter, a filter in the canister of a gas mask
- Canister filter, a canister that is used to filter beer
- Canister filter, a canister-styled fluid filter introduced in some of the Chrysler Corporation's automatic transmissions known as TorqueFlite
- Canister filter, a filter that is used to treat sulfur water
- Canister filter, a respirator canister or cartridge that is used to clean pollution from air
- Canister filter, in compressed air dryer
- Canister oil filter; for example see Mercedes-Benz OM617 engine

== See also ==
- Canister (disambiguation)
- Filtration
