= Charles Skepper =

British espionage agent

Charles Milne Skepper
- Born: Charles Milne Skepper; 26 February 1905; Richmond, Surrey
- Died: 4 April 1944 (aged 39) unknown, possibly Buchenwald concentration camp, Nazi Germany, or Compiègne, France
- Burial place: commemorated Brookwood Memorial
- Military career
- Allegiance: United Kingdom
- Branch: British Army
- Service years: 1940–1944
- Rank: Captain
- Nickname: Charlie
- Service number: 270156
- Units: Special Operations Executive, SOE
- Conflicts: World War II
- Awards: Member of the Most Excellent Order of the British Empire, Croix de Guerre avec Palme

Charles Milne Skepper MBE (26 February 1905 – on or after 4 April 1944) was an economist and socialist intellectual who joined the British Special Operations Executive (SOE) to operate in occupied France during the Second World War carrying out sabotage and spying missions until he was taken prisoner. He was tortured for information and subsequently murdered by the Gestapo.

== Pre-war life ==
Skepper was born in Richmond, London, the son of Henry and Mary Skepper. He, his older brother (Edmund Drane Skepper), and his younger sister (Mabel Mary known as Mary) spent much of their early lives in France particularly in Paris, although Skepper studied at Queen Elizabeth's School in Cranbrook from September 1914 to July 1920. He was a highly intelligent student with a deep interest in social justice and a gifted linguist from an early age, he learned to speak perfect French and then German and Spanish. In later life he learned some Russian and good Chinese. Skepper had deeply held political views from a relatively early age being a serious socialist and after deep consideration over a long period he decided that he was an atheist. He was attracted to theoretical communism and became a member of the "Friends of the Soviet Union" a factor recorded by MI5 in London and in the late 1920s travelling by train he made two visits to the Soviet Union. These visits changed his earlier positive views of Soviet Communism and turned him away from that path. His father later stated that after his visits he came to regard communism as fascism under a different guise.

Skepper was a student at the London School of Economics (LSE) from 1926 to 1929, earning a Bachelor of Science degree First in Economics his specialist subject was Sociology. Some older sources state that he gained a BA, however they were apparently based on one single source which has since been digitised and corrected. before a brief period as a graduate student during which time he lived in an apartment on Great Ormond Street, in central London. with his sister Mabel Mary Skepper who was also a student at the LSE. He did not complete his doctorate but worked as an assistant teacher of Sociology from 1930 to 1932 when he moved home to 27 Gordon Square also in central London. In 1931 Skepper was awarded a Rockefeller Fellowship.

Throughout the remainder of the 1930s he was in a partnership operating from near Paris, trading in antiques and travelling in the trade between France and Beijing where he lived for sometime. He became deeply interested in modern art and purchased paintings by Da Silva, Max Ernst and Edouard Cortes, his collection was stolen from the family home at Rueil-Malmaison near Paris during the Second World War. On 9 September 1932, while living in Paris, he applied for a visa to visit the United States. He sailed on 24 September 1932 from Le Havre aboard the British ocean liner Samaria, returning some weeks later. On 14 April 1936 he sailed to New York from England aboard the ocean liner Aquitania, declaring himself to be a "Dealer" on a visit to Japan from which he returned sailing from Yokohama for the U.S. on 26 July 1936 aboard the American liner President Jackson with his 61-year-old mother.

Travelling to China, he sailed from Southampton for New York again on 2 February 1937 aboard the French steamer Champlain describing himself as a tourist, arriving in New York on 9 February 1937 he crossed the U.S. by railway before journeying onward from San Francisco on 20 March 1937 aboard the ocean liner President Taft, bound for Honolulu. On the final leg of his journey Skepper sailed from Honolulu on 8 April 1937 aboard the U.S. ocean liner President Hoover to disembark at Shanghai.

== Wartime service ==
In 1939 Skepper volunteered for military service and was appointed to run the propaganda broadcasting station of the British Ministry of Information in Shanghai. When the Japanese invaded Shanghai, he evaded internment and spent time operating with Chinese guerrillas until he was captured by the Japanese, ill-treated, and sentenced to four years in prison for anti-Japanese activities, having been accused of helping four American marines to escape. However, he was repatriated when he was included in an exchange of diplomats between the United Kingdom and Japan in December 1941. Skepper returned to England in August 1942.

== Special Operations Executive ==
In late summer 1942 he applied to join the Special Operations Executive citing Morris Ginsberg LSE "Martin White Professor of Sociology" as a referee and passing stringent examination and "vetting" he was accepted for "F" (French) Section despite being near the top of the upper age limit. He commenced training at the SOE school based at Wanborough Manor in West Surrey learning aspects of the trade such as navigation, parachuting, killing with and without weapons, behaviour if captured, explosives and demolition, wireless and cyphers, shooting with pistols, sub-machine guns and rifles and familiarity with captured enemy weapons. A report in his file dated 27 March 1943 stated "He has done extremely well in training". To make his position more certain for official purposes on 16 June 1943 he became lieutenant on the British Army "General List" of "non-regimentally employed" officers with the military service number of 270156

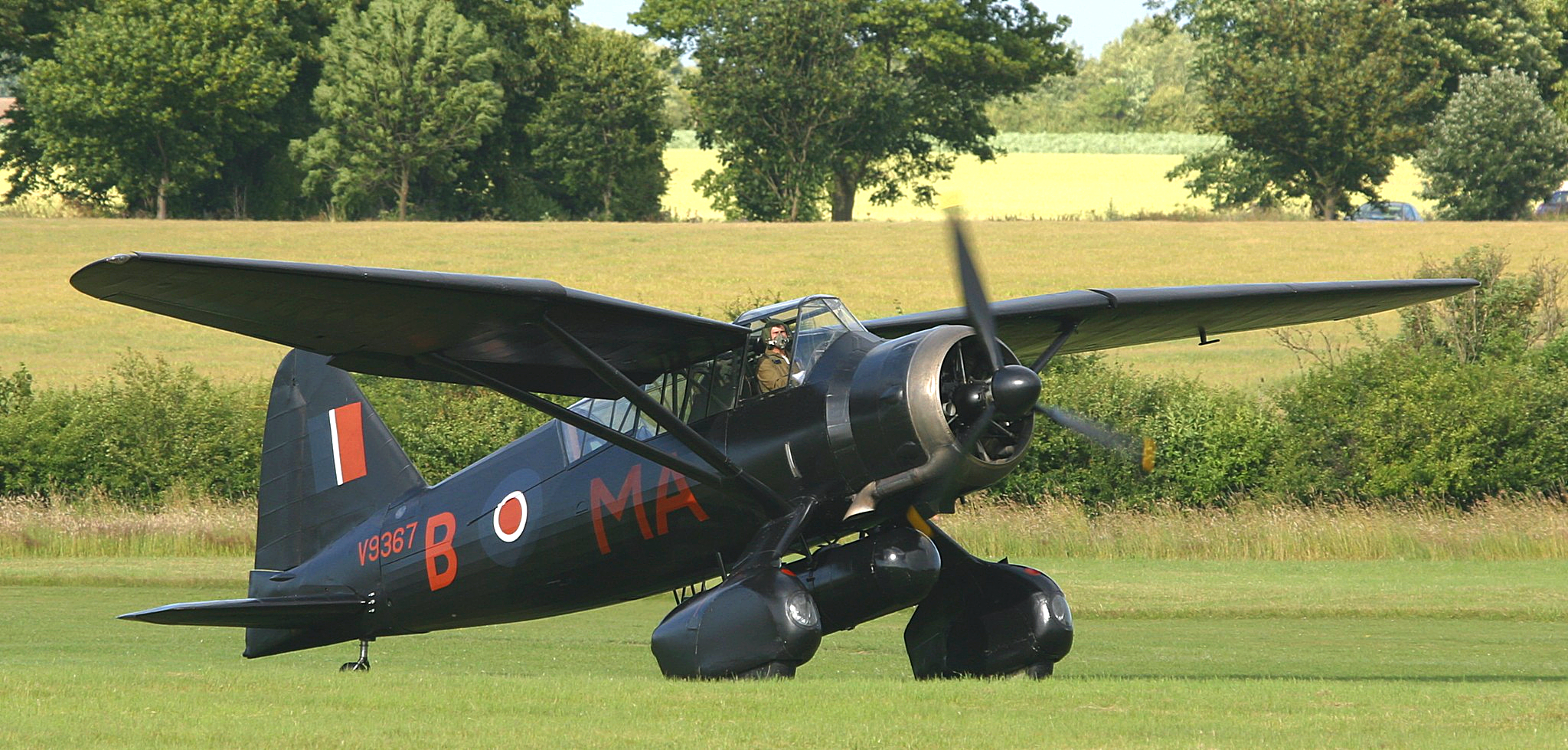
Westland Lysander Mk III (SD), the type used for special missions into occupied France during World War II.

With several codenames, including "Henri Edouard Truchot" and "Bernard", Skepper was landed in France by an RAF Special Duties Westland Lysander of No. 161 Squadron RAF on the night 16–17 June 1943 to organise a new resistance and espionage ring in the Marseille region which would be known as the "Monk circuit". to work with the French Resistance in the "Monk Circuit" operating in the Marseilles region. Skepper was flown in with a fellow agent Diana Rowden by the specialist covert operations pilot Flying Officer Jimmy McCairns DFC and 2 Bars MM. It was a double aircraft operation to land a number of agents in the Loire valley seven miles north east of Angers. The two aircraft carried Skepper, Cecily Lefort, Diana Rowden, and Noor Inayat Khan. Three days later he was joined by his radio operator Arthur Steele code named "Laurent" who landed by parachute.

Over a period of nine months in the Marseille area he travelled extensively pretending to be an antiques dealer and using a case of his own antique jade objects as cover. Skepper built up an extremely effective sabotage group and organised a number of significant acts of sabotage. Skepper was noted to have always personally led operations and taken on the dangerous role of receiving parachuted supplies from England. Among the many acts of sabotage he led was an attack on a synthetic oil plant regarded as vital to the German war effort. Located at L'Estaque three oil tanks were destroyed and six damaged, he also led the mission to block an important rail tunnel near the Italian border by derailing a train inside the tunnel between Cassis and Aubagne and blew up the cement works used by the German military at Fos-sur-Mer In between these major operations he blew up railway tracks, power lines and damaged railway engines whenever possible

On the night of 13–14 August 1943 a new agent Eliane Plewman parachuted in to Jura to join their team. In the first two weeks of January 1944 Skepper's "Monk circuit" was responsible for damaging 31 railway locomotives, during February 1944 he organised 5 parachute drops of arms, ammunition and explosives and on 6 March 1944 met Jack Sinclair as he parachuted in to join the network before they organised and led a mission which resulted in damaging over 30 railway locomotives in a single day on 15 March 1944.

== Betrayal and imprisonment ==
Skepper was arrested with others on 23, 24 or 25 March 1944 (dates vary with sources) in the apartment where he had been staying in Rue Merentie with French friends of the Villevieille family after betrayal by a French national (Bousquet) working for the Gestapo. The traitor was identified and executed after the war. Everybody at the apartment was taken away while Bousquet and the Gestapo made the place look as normal as possible so that they could wait and trap any members of Skepper's team who visited. On the next day his radio operator Arthur Steele was arrested as was one of his agents Eliane Plewman code name "Gaby" and several French members. No arrests happened other than of people coming to that address which indicates that under torture no names were given away.

At the Baumettes prison and at Gestapo headquarters in 425 Rue Paradis Marseille the Gestapo tortured their three British captives by delivering very powerful electric shocks between the eyes and the results were so bad that when the British were seen by French prisoners they were almost unrecognisable. When Skepper was seen in the Gestapo offices in the custody of Gestapo Agent Dunker by Villevielle two weeks after their arrests he also reported being unable to recognise his friend.

It is noted that SS-Obersturmführer Ernst Dunker (born 27 January 1912 in Halle) was tried post-war in France for his crimes and executed on 6 June 1950 in Marseille.

== Fate ==
Initial reports in his SOE file were that he was killed rather than arrested; there was certainly a serious scuffle during the arrest but later information suggested that he was seized, interrogated and tortured by the Gestapo and probably sent to Germany. In the recommendation for Skepper's MBE reportedly originally an OBE but later downgraded written by Major General Colin Gubbins the head of SOE on 8 December 1945 he stated that "Captain Skepper was arrested. He was severely tortured by the Gestapo and later transported to Fresnes and then to Compiegne prison. There has been no news of him since".

Skepper was one of the few SOE agents whose fate has never been finally resolved. According to his SOE file postwar interviews with the French national who arrested him and with the two Gestapo officers based at Marseille produced no relevant information. Skepper's death was officially recognised by the War Office on 28 October 1946, where it was recorded as 'Presumed died while in enemy hands on or shortly after 1 April 1944'. That date may have been much too early. There have been a number of speculations about his death but one possibility is that Skepper was executed in Buchenwald concentration camp in the autumn of 1944. Reports of Skepper in captivity can be found as late as October 1944 when the SOE file noted that Skepper was ""seen in Hamburg". Arthur Steele was executed on 9 September 1944 and Eliane Plewman at Dachau concentration camp on 13 September 1944. but no further news of Skepper could be found. A number of French, Belgian, English and Canadians who belonged to Allied secret services were hanged by the SS in Buchenwald which is where a number of British agents are known from other sources to have met their deaths. It is quite possible that Skepper was executed there.

His fate was still unclear to the War Office in December 1945 and he was mentioned in the London Gazette as a lieutenant on the General List still in receipt of pay and allowances (effective 1 November 1945). The Skepper family maintained his apartment (No. D5 Sloane Avenue Mansions) in his name until 1948.

For official purposes the date of 4 April 1944 was set as his date of death and as he had disappeared Skepper's name was commemorated by the Commonwealth War Graves Commission on the Brookwood Memorial to the missing. Several reports state that he died in Buchenwald concentration camp of the effects of the ill treatment suffered at the hands of the Gestapo.

== Awards ==
Awarded a posthumous MBE by the British government in the London Gazette 28 February 1946.

Awarded a posthumous Croix de Guerre 1939-1945 avec Palme by the French government, the citation for which was issued on 16 January 1946 and signed by De Gaulle, and L'Ordre de l'Armée.

== Legacy ==
By 8 May 1946, the first anniversary of VE Day, he was presumed officially dead for the purpose of probate, though the substantive assumption of death was delayed until October 1946. However, although he had died intestate Skepper had left a 'soldier's will' and his estate was administered on 18 January 1948, with the administration document simply saying that he had died 'on war service'. His whole estate was valued at £38,035 18s 2d (a huge sum for that time) and his mother then informed the London School of Economics that he had said that in the event of his death, at least part of this should be used for the furtherance of sociology at the School. A bequest of £20,000 (currently worth approximately £500,000-£700,000) was made via a deed of trust, for 'Sociological Research at the School' by the establishment of The Charles Skepper House for Sociological Research with a Research Fellowship and Studentships. Sadly little apparently came of the intended Research Fellowship and Studentships, although the Charles Skepper House project was originally a large facility at LSE's campus on John Adam Street just south of the Strand there is no longer any physical trace of any such facility at LSE and Skepper's name has virtually disappeared.

== Commemoration ==
By name on the Brookwood Memorial in Surrey.

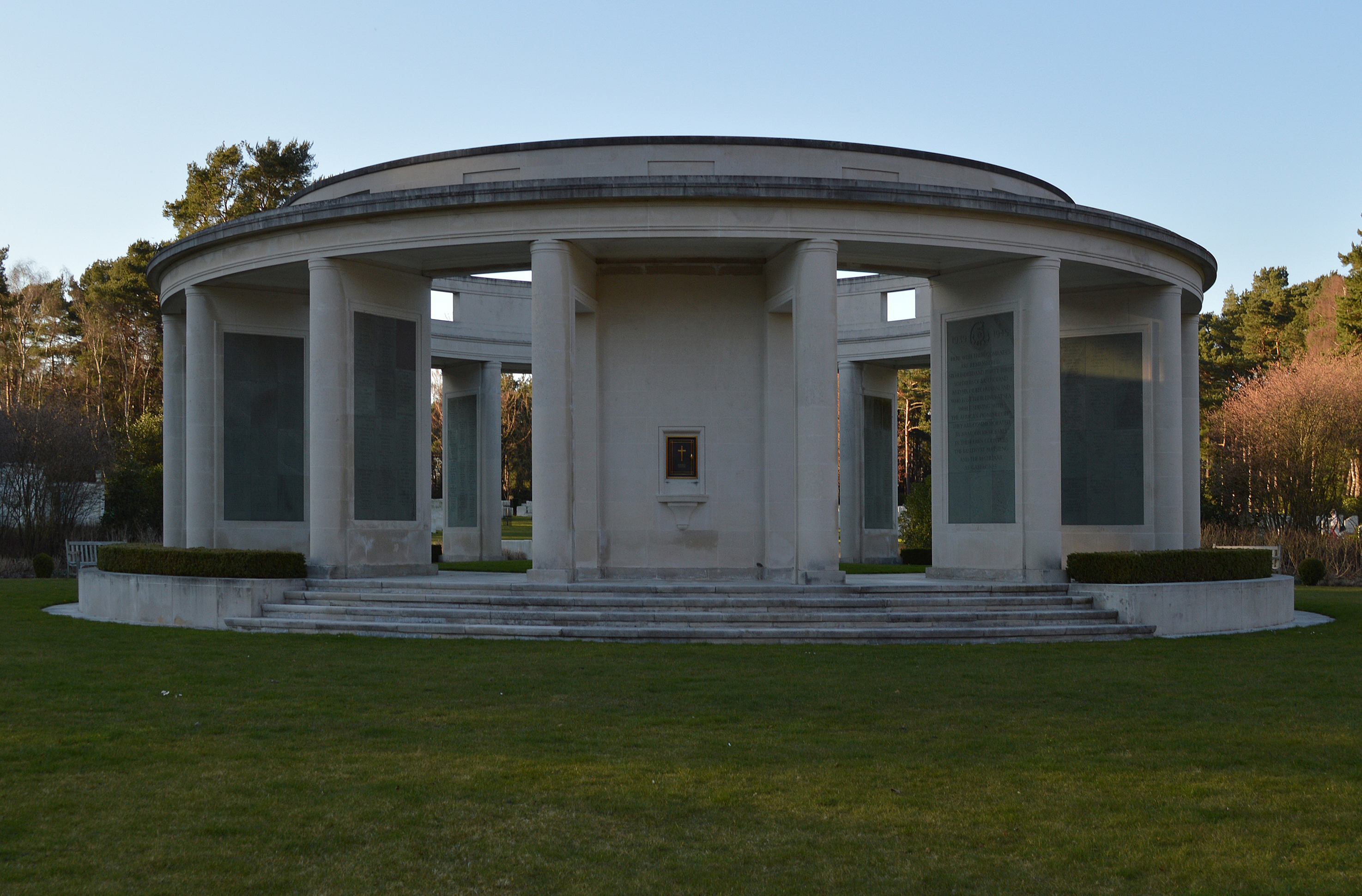
The Brookwood Memorial, built in 1958 and designed by Ralph Hobday

By name on the SOE F Section Memorial at Valençay in France. There is a commemorative plaque on the apartment building where Skepper and his comrades were captured in 1944. Skepper's name is commemorated on the LSE war memorial in their Old Building. By name on the British Forces Roll of Honour.

== Notes ==
See also SOE F Section networks

Mrs Mary Skepper (mother of Charles) was appointed an OBE in the Birthday Honours List 1950.
