= Eliane Plewman =

British SOE espionage agent

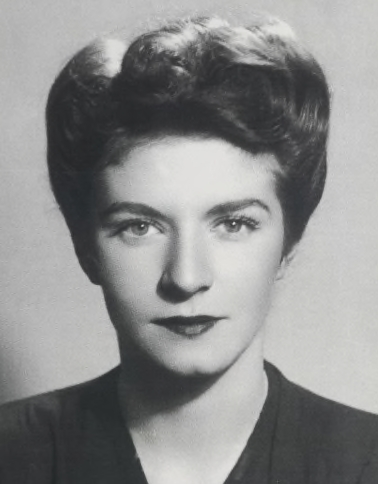
- Eliane Plewman
- Born: Eliane Sophie Browne-Bartroli; 6 December 1917; Marseille, France
- Died: 13 September 1944 (aged 26); Dachau concentration camp, Bavaria Nazi Germany
- Burial place: Brookwood Memorial
- Military career
- Allegiance: United Kingdom
- Branch: Special Operations Executive
- Service years: 1943–1944
- Rank: Ensign
- Nicknames: Gaby, Dean, Madame Dupont (SOE codenames); Eliane Jacqueline Prunier (SOE alias)
- Service number: F/23
- Unit: Monk (SOE)
- Conflicts: Second World War
- Awards: King's Commendation for Brave Conduct; Croix de Guerre 1939-1945 (France)

Éliane Sophie Plewman (6 December 1917 – 13 September 1944) was a British agent of the Special Operations Executive (SOE) and a member of the French Resistance working as a courier for the "MONK circuit" in occupied France during World War II. SOE's objective was to conduct espionage, sabotage and reconnaissance against the Axis powers, especially Nazi Germany in occupied Europe and to aid local resistance movements. Plewman was captured by the Gestapo, and later executed by the SS in Dachau.

== Pre-war life ==
Plewman was born Éliane Sophie Browne-Bartroli in Marseille, France. The daughter of Eugene Henry Browne-Bartroli, an English manufacturer based in France, and his Spanish wife Elisa Francesca (née Bartroli), she was educated in England and in Spain at the British School in Madrid. Plewman's brother Albert Browne-Bartroli was also an SOE agent in France. He survived the war.

When she finished college she moved to Leicester to work for a clothing and fabric import/export company in Albion Street, using her language skills in English, French, Spanish and some Portuguese.

== World War II ==
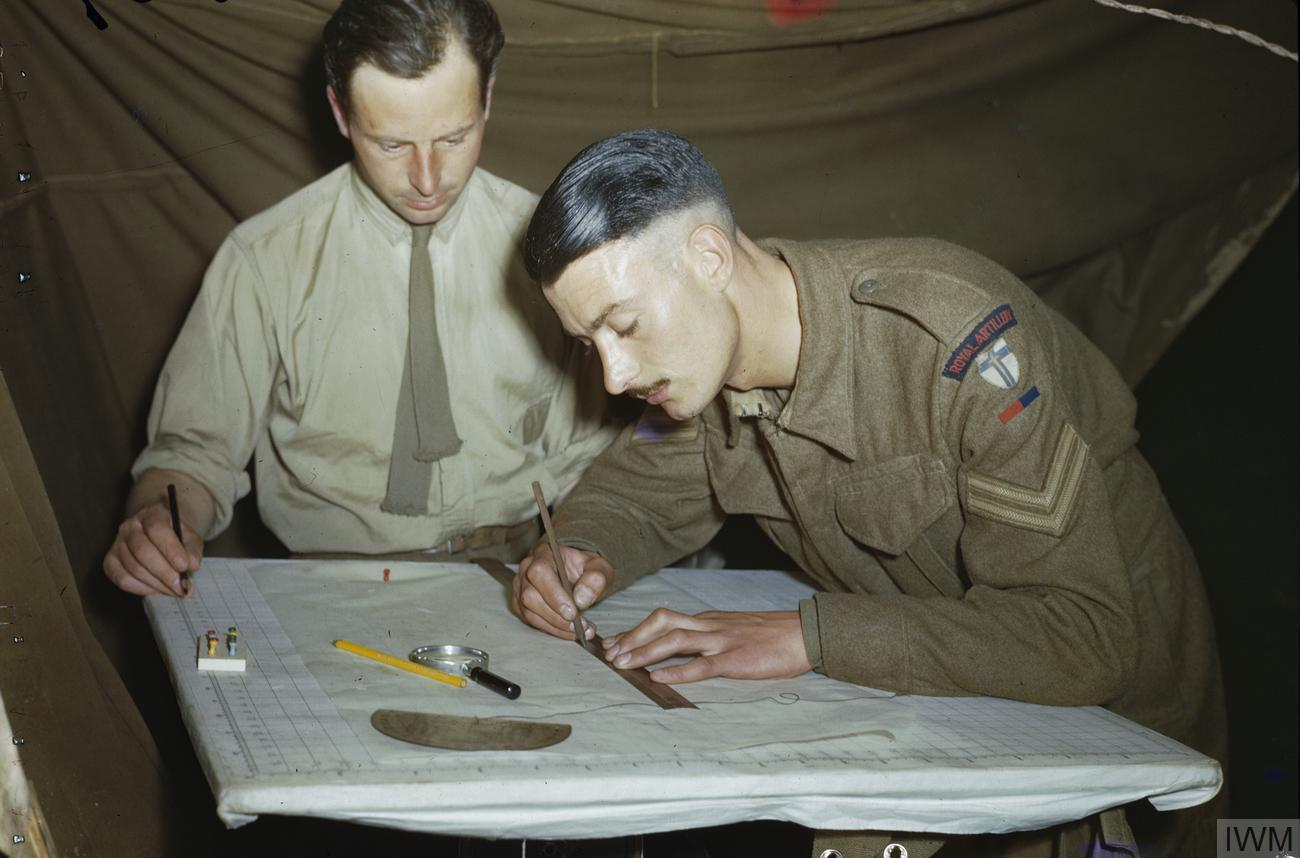
Lt T. L. Plewman (l) with Bdr O. Seman, July 1944, Caen, Normandy

After the outbreak of the Second World War in 1939, Plewman worked for the Press Section of the British Embassies in Madrid and Lisbon until 1941. In 1942, she returned to Britain to work for the Spanish Press section of the Ministry of Information.

On 28 July 1942, Eliane married Thomas Langford "Tom" Plewman (1911–2000) at Kensington, London. Originally from Athy in County Kildare, Ireland, he had recently been commissioned as an officer in the Royal Artillery. Their home was at 14 Queen's Gate Terrace, Leicester.

=== Special Operations Executive ===
In mid-February 1943, Plewman joined the Special Operations Executive (SOE) and was accepted on 25 February 1943 for training to serve as an "agent in the field". Plewman signed the Official Secrets Act on 29 March 1943 and a second time on 19 April 1943 (this time as second lieutenant Auxiliary Territorial Service) and commenced training at Wanborough Manor at the start of May 1943. Despite her sylph-like figure and tiny frame – she was just over five feet tall – Plewman took the same training course near Inverness as the men did, showing determination in every exercise. She learnt weapons handling, hand-to-hand combat, techniques for sabotage, clandestine survival, security, orientation, radio communications. Plewman also learnt how to kill with – or without – a weapon, how to handle explosives and detonators, sabotage railway lines, blow up trains, take on a new identity, improvise answers to any question, invent a plausible past and cover story, including a likely occupation, without ever giving herself away or contradicting herself. Plewman passed the psychological tests set for future agents by the various officers in charge of evaluating candidates, tests which assessed their determination and mental fortitude. Her trainers described her as "calm, efficient, and conscientious, and with admirable composure" and "a great asset to the gaiety of the party."

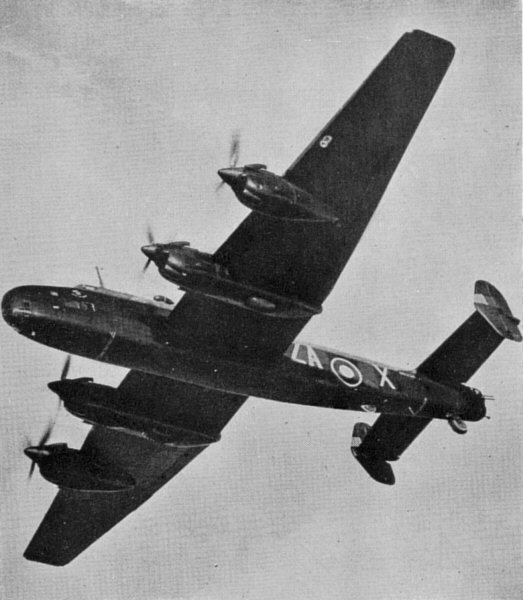
The Handley Page Halifax B.II Special were used for SOE operations.

After two failed attempts on preceding nights due to bad weather, Plewman parachuted into France on the night of 13/14 August 1943 from a special duties Handley Page Halifax Mark II bomber of No. 161 Squadron RAF from an altitude of little over 1,000 feet, keeping low to avoid German radar. Her cover name was "Eliane Jacqueline Prunier", her codenames were "Gaby" and "Dean", or sometimes "Madame Dupont". Plewman worked for Captain Charles Milne Skepper (alias "Henri Truchot"), the organiser of SOE's Monk circuit, in which she was to be the courier in the area of Marseille, Roquebrune and St. Raphael, providing the communications link between groups of saboteurs and intelligence gathering agents, Monk's wireless operator Arthur Steele, and other involved groups.

Major General Colin Gubbins Head of SOE wrote as a part of his recommendation for Plewman's gallantry award: "She was dropped in the Jura and was separated from her circuit for some time. Instead of remaining in hiding she showed outstanding initiative and made several contacts on her own which were later of great value to her circuit. For six months Plewman worked as a courier and her untiring devotion to duty and willingness to undergo any risk largely contributed to the successful establishment of her circuit. She travelled constantly maintaining liaison between the various groups, acting as guide to newly arriving agents and transporting wireless telegraphy equipment and compromising documents."

At this time Plewman's older brother, Albert Browne-Bartroli, was working as an SOE agent in a different part of France. He survived the war and was awarded a Distinguished Service Order. Browne-Bartroli (codename "Tiburce") had, after undergoing identical training, become head of SOE's Ditcher circuit, which was active in Bourgogne from October 1943 to September 1944, which he led until the Allies' final victory. Tiburce received, on 14 July 1944, the biggest parachute drop of arms ever made to the maquis in daylight.

== Capture and imprisonment ==
Plewman's organiser Charles Skepper and several other people were arrested in Marseille about 23 March 1944 when the Gestapo raided a safe house. The Germans left agents behind in the apartment to arrest any other agents who came to the house. The next day Plewman and wireless operator Arthur Steele came to the apartment. Plewman was regarded as impulsive by her colleagues and, despite suspicions that the safe house was compromised, she rang the doorbell. Two Germans opened the door and captured her. Plewman was taken to Gestapo headquarters. After being interrogated for three or four weeks, she was transferred to Fresnes Prison in Paris where seven other female SOE agents were also incarcerated. On 12 May 1944, the eight women were transported to Karlsruhe prison in Germany.

== Execution ==
During the night of 11 September 1944, the Gestapo collected Éliane Plewman, Yolande Beekman and Madeleine Damerment from the prison and drove them to Karlsruhe railway station in time to catch the early train to Munich. From there they caught a local train to Dachau and late in the evening walked to Dachau concentration camp arriving at about midnight. Between 0800 and 1000 hours the next morning, 13 September 1944, Plewman and three other SOE agents (Yolande Beekman, Madeleine Damerment and Noor Inayat Khan) were taken from their cell and forced to kneel in pairs before being executed by a single shot to the head by executioner Wilhelm Ruppert.

A Gestapo man named Max Wassmer was in charge of prisoner transports at Karlsruhe and accompanied the women to Dachau. Another Gestapo man named Christian Ott gave a statement to American investigators after the war as to the fate of Plewman and her three companions. Ott was stationed at Karlsruhe and volunteered to accompany the four women to Dachau as he wanted to visit his family in Stuttgart on the return journey. Though not present at the execution, Ott told investigators what Wassmer had told him.

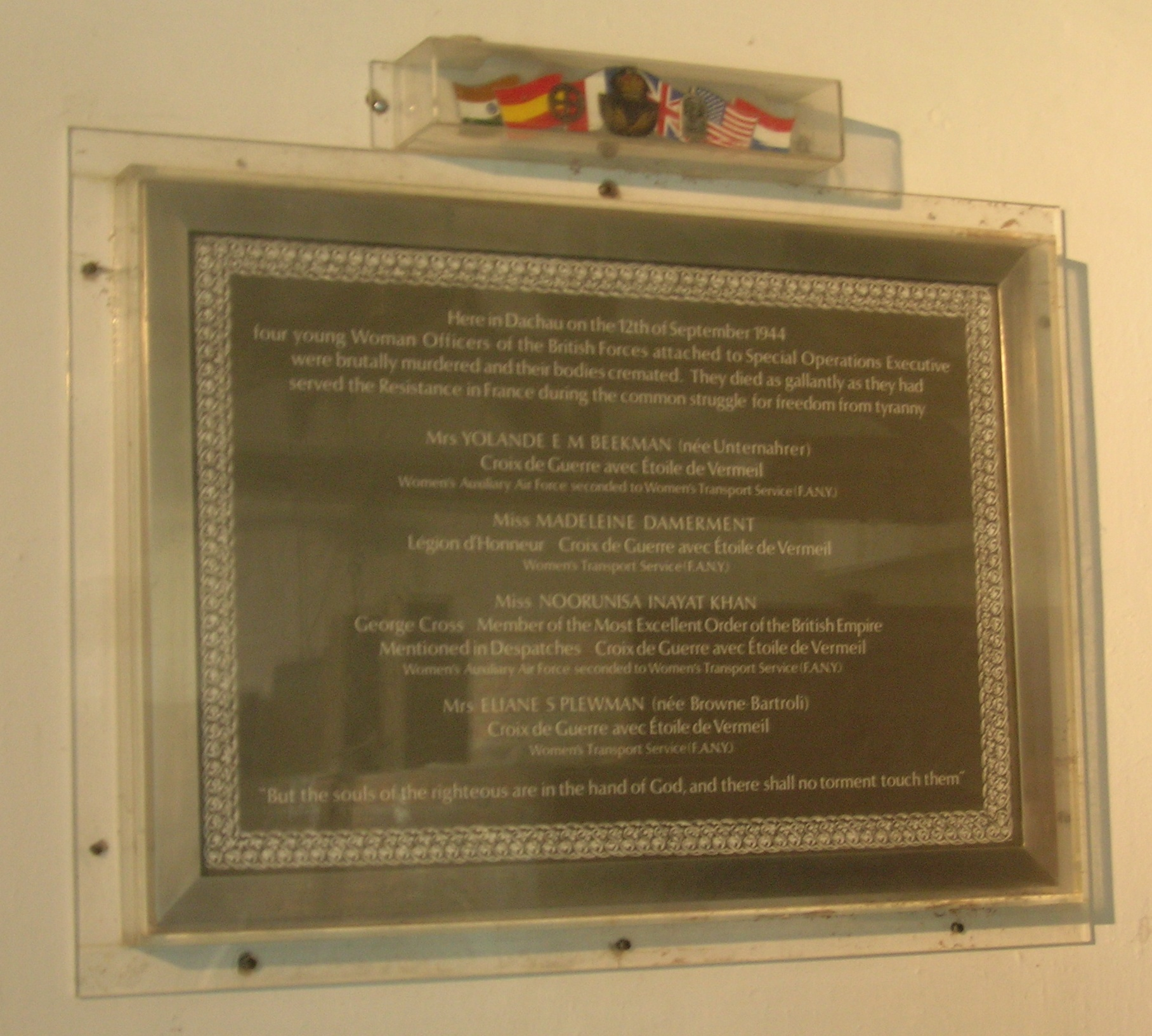
Memorial to Plewman and fellow agents in Dachau

The four prisoners had come from the barrack in the camp, where they had spent the night, into the yard where the shooting was to be carried out. Here he [Wassmer] had announced the death sentence to them. Only the Lagerkommandant and the two SS men had been present. The German-speaking Englishwoman (the major) had told her companions of this death sentence. All four had grown very pale and wept; the major asked whether they could protest against the sentence. The Kommandant declared that no protest could be made against the sentence. The major had then asked to see a priest. The camp Kommandant refused this on the grounds that there was no priest in the camp.

The four prisoners now had to kneel with their heads towards a small mound of earth and were killed by the two SS, one after another by a shot through the back of the neck. During the shooting the two Englishwomen held hands and the two Frenchwomen likewise. For three of the prisoners, the first shot caused death, but for the German-speaking Englishwoman [Beekman] a second shot had to be fired as she still showed signs of life after the first shot.

After the shooting of these prisoners, the Lagerkommandant said to the two SS men that he took a personal interest in the jewellery of the women and that this should be taken into his office.

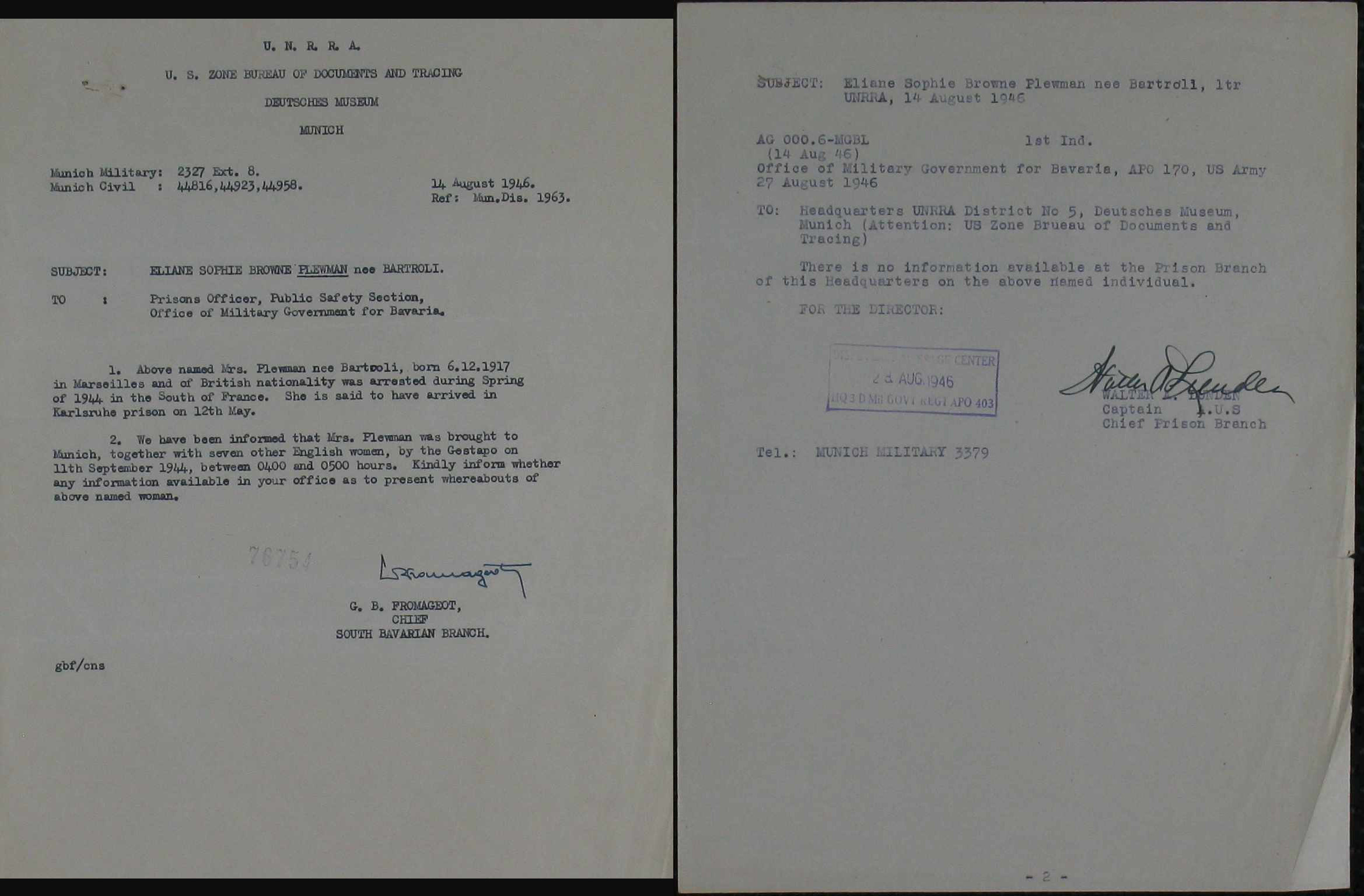
Post-war request and report on the efforts to locate Éliane Plewman

== Honours and awards ==
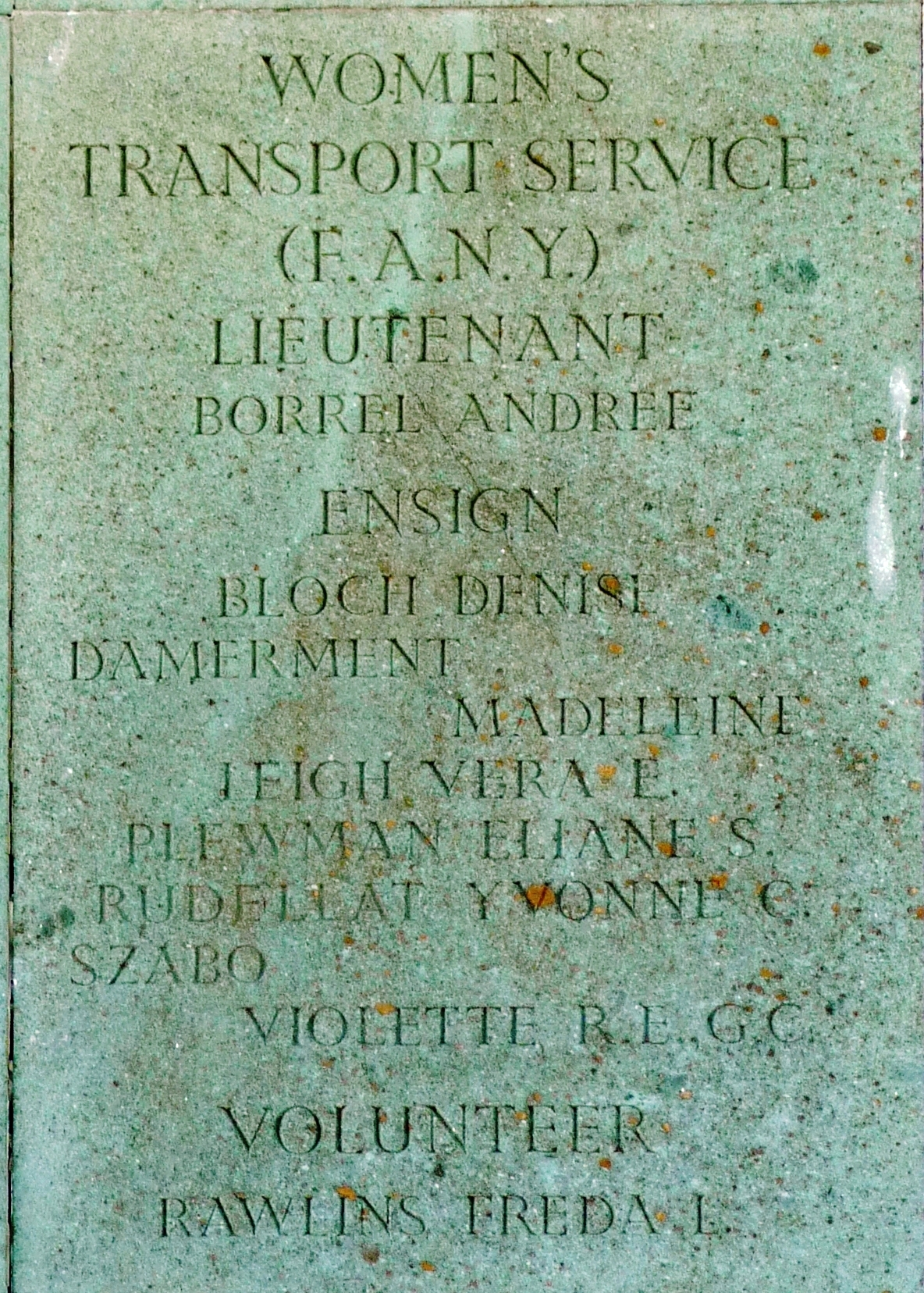
FANY (SOE) memorial, Brookwood Military Cemetery

Éliane Plewman is remembered on the Brookwood Memorial in Surrey (Panel 26 Column 3), and the F Section Memorial, in Valençay, France. In 1998 the Mayor of Marseille unveiled a plaque on 8, rue Mérentié to commemorate the place where Plewman, Charles Skepper and Arthur Steele, all Monk agents, were arrested by the Gestapo; and, in the 13th arrondissement, a street was named in her honour.

- King's Commendation for Brave Conduct awarded posthumously in the London Gazette 20 August 1946. "For services in France during the enemy occupation".
- Croix de Guerre 1939-1945 with bronze star (France) on 16 January 1946.

Major General Colin Gubbins recommended Éliane Plewman for an MBE (Member of the Order of the British Empire) on 13 July 1945; however he was overruled, as the statutes of the award do not allow posthumous awards, and instead she was awarded the King's Commendation for Brave Conduct.

1939–1945 Star	France and Germany Star	War Medal with King's Commendation for Brave Conduct	Croix de Guerre (France)

== Notes ==
Post-war investigations determined very clear evidence of the fate of the group of female British SOE agents and, unlike some of their colleagues, their families had detailed accounts of their time in captivity and of their deaths. Eliane Plewman's estate was settled on 25 April 1947.
