= Bonnot =

Bonnot (French: [bɔno]) is a French surname. Notable people with the surname include:

- Alexandre Bonnot (born 1973), French footballer
- Françoise Bonnot (1939–2018), French film editor
- Jules Bonnot (1876–1912), French anarchist, leader of "La Bande à Bonnot"
- Marcel Bonnot (born 1946), French politician
- Richard Bonnot (1957–2025), French singer, musician and actor

== See also ==
- Bonnaud, former commune in France
- Bonneau (disambiguation)
- Bonnot Gang ("La Bande à Bonnot"), a French criminal anarchist group
- Bono (disambiguation)
- Saint-Bonnot, a commune in France
- Villard-Bonnot, a commune in France
