= Ethel Hobday =

Irish pianist (1872 - 1947)

- Born: Ethel Palmer Sharpe; 28 November 1872; Dublin, Ireland
- Died: 10 July 1947; Tankerton, England, U.K.
- Occupation: Pianist
- Spouse: Alfred Charles Hobday
- Children: 3, including Ralph Hobday
- Relatives: Claude Hobday (brother-in-law); Albert Sammons (son-in-law)

Ethel Palmer Hobday, née Sharpe (28 November 1872 – 10 July 1947) was an Irish pianist, who became famous in chamber-music recitals especially in England, and was married to the violist Alfred Charles Hobday. She made several recordings in the 1920s.

== Early life and education ==
Ethel Palmer Sharpe was born in Dublin. She was a pupil at the Royal Irish Academy of Music. She then went on to study at the Royal College of Music in London, under Franklin Taylor. Her further studies in Vienna brought her into the social and professional company of Johannes Brahms in his last years.

== Career ==
Sharpe gave her first recital in the Prince's Hall, London in November 1891. She received the silver medal of the Musicians' Company. In 1894 she gave a recital in Vienna, but reappeared in London in 1895. After marriage, she became known as Ethel Hobday. The Hobdays were both heard with the Bath Quartette Society in 1910, and in "war emergency entertainments" in 1915. She took part in early recordings of full-length chamber-works (Brahms and Elgar Quintets) with the London Quartet and the Spencer Dyke Quartet. She accompanied violinist Albert Sammons, Adila Fachiri, Jelly d'Arányi, Phyllis Allan, Jean Robley, and Bessie Rawlins, cellist Felix Salmond, and violist Lionel Tertis, in concerts and early recordings. Myra Hess was one of her close friends.

Hobday performed on radio programmes in the 1920s. She toured in the United States in 1927. In 1940, she played at a British Red Cross benefit concert in Tankerton. "Ethel Hobday as a player of chamber music is unsurpassed," declared a 1920 review. "She gives us the very bones of the thing. She has made the music her very own, as if she had composed it; she cares for it as if it were a human being."

== Personal life ==
Sharpe married English musician Alfred Hobday in 1895. Their children were Olive, Stella, and Ralph. Albert's brother was bassist Claude Hobday. Ralph Hobday became a noted architect; Olive Hobday married Albert Sammons. Her husband died in 1942. Ethel Hobday died 10 July 1947, in Tankerton.
