= Arthur Steele =

Arthur Steele may refer to:

- Arthur Steele (SOE agent) (1921–1944), British soldier
- Arthur E. Steele (1920–2011), American minister of the Bible Presbyterian Church
