= Arthur Steele (SOE agent) =

French espionage agent

- Born: Arthur Steele; 6 April 1921; Nœux-les-Mines, France
- Died: 14 September 1944 (aged 23); Buchenwald Concentration Camp, Germany
- Burial place: commemorated Brookwood Memorial
- Relatives: Isabelle Steele (nee Patterson) wife
- Military career
- Allegiance: United Kingdom
- Branch: British Army
- Service years: 1935–1944
- Rank: Captain
- Service number: 263403
- Units: Special Operations Executive, SOE
- Conflicts: World War II
- Awards: Mention in Despatches; Croix de Guerre 1939-1945 avec Palme

Arthur Steele (6 April 1921 – 14 September 1944) was a British soldier who joined Special Operations Executive (SOE) to operate in occupied France during the Second World War as a wireless operator carrying out sabotage and spying missions until he was taken prisoner. He was tortured for information unsuccessfully by the Gestapo and subsequently killed by the SS.

== Early life ==
Steele was born at Nœux-les-Mines in France, the son of Arthur Steele a former British soldier and his French wife Marie Hortense Steele. He grew up at the family home 47 Hibbert Street in Luton and also at his Grandparents home at Arras in France. In 1935 aged 14 he enlisted in the Royal Artillery at Woolwich as a Boy Soldier Bandsman and later also gained his proficiency certificate as a wireless telegraphy operator. No. 847209 Gunner Arthur Steele spent the early war years with Headquarters Royal Artillery 77 Division based in England but in mid 1942 applied for duty with Special Operations Executive as he spoke fluent French and was a wireless operator.

== Special Operations Executive ==
Steele commenced training at Wanborough Manor near Guildford in the autumn of 1942 and participated in his SOE initial security course from 5 October 1942 until 30 October 1942. He was classed as "exceptionally keen and conscientious" and signed the Official Secrets Act on 16 November 1942. Steele was commissioned on 1 January 1943 as second lieutenant on the General List with service number P/263403. Suffering quite serious illness he was hospitalised for several weeks in Oxford after Christmas 1942. On discharge from hospital he married Isabelle Bowhill in Watford in March 1943. Steele completed his SOE training to join SOE F Section networks and was promoted acting lieutenant effective 19 June 1943 and lieutenant on 1 July 1943.

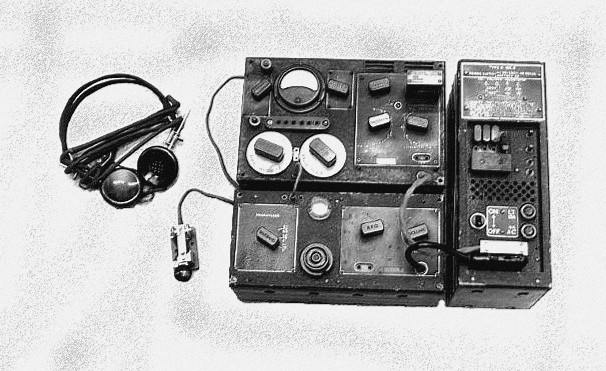
Type 3 Mk. II receiver and transmitter (also known as the B2 radio set).

Steele was parachuted into France by No. 161 Squadron RAF on an SOE special duties mission on 19 June 1943, to act as network radio operator for the "MONK" network run by Charles Skepper who worked under the code name "Bernard" in the Marseille district. His code name was "Waiter" or "Laurent" and he was using the cover name Arthur Saulnier and later Arthur Clermont. He was active in the Barjols area where he lodged with the manager of a gasoline station. Steele installed six transmitters in the hills around Barjols and Saint-Martin-de-Pallières in places only accessible to knowledgeable local people. Each day from July 1943 to March 1944 he made contact with London passing and receiving about 400 messages. Steele arrange for a new agent Eliane Plewman to be parachuted in to Jura to join their team on the night of 13–14 August 1943. On several occasions Italian and German intelligence teams tried to locate the source of the radio signals but they had no effective local guides and were unable to reach his location on each attempt. The MONK circuit were able to carry out repeated acts of sabotage with explosives parachuted in from British bombers, (see article on Charles Skepper). In early March 1944 due to local changes he had to leave Barjols to join the group in Marseille.

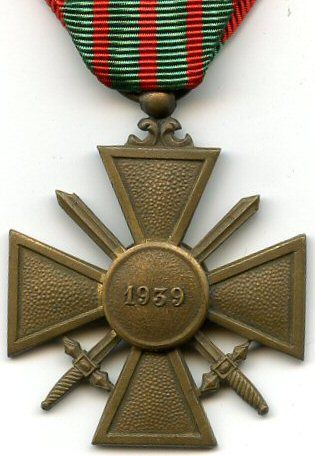
Reverse of the 1939–1945 War Cross

== Betrayal and Imprisonment ==
The MONK network organiser Charles Skepper was arrested with others on 23 or 24 March 1944 (dates vary with sources) in the apartment where he had been staying at 8 Rue Mérentié with French friends, the Villevieille family, after betrayal by a French national (Bousquet) working for the Gestapo. The traitor was identified and executed after the war. Everybody at the apartment was taken away while Bousquet and the Gestapo made the place look as normal as possible so that they could wait and trap any members of Skepper's team who visited. On the next day Arthur Steele was arrested when he called to visit Skepper with their courier Eliane Plewman code name "Gaby" and several French members. No arrests happened other than of people coming to that address which indicates that even under torture no names were given away.

At the Baumettes prison and at Gestapo headquarters in 425 Rue Paradis Marseille the Gestapo under agent Ernst Dunker tortured their three British captives by delivering very powerful electric shocks between the eyes and the results were so bad that when the British were seen by French prisoners they were almost unrecognisable.

SS-Obersturmführer Ernst Dunker (born 27 January 1912 in Halle) was tried post-war in France for his crimes and executed on 6 June 1950 in Marseille.

== Fate ==
Initial reports in Steele's SOE personnel file were that he was arrested, interrogated and tortured by the Gestapo and probably sent to Germany. The citation for his Posthumous Mention in Despatches written on 23 August 1945 by Major General Colin Gubbins states that he was executed at Buchenwald Concentration Camp on 14 September 1944. Other sources state that Arthur Steele was executed on 9 September 1944 and Eliane Plewman at Dachau concentration camp on 13 September 1944. No trace of Charles Skepper was ever found but it is believed that on or after 4 April 1944 he had died in Buchenwald. It was known from German sources that between 9 September 1944 and 14 September 1944 groups of captured agents held prisoner there were hanged at Buchenwald by the SS. Steele was amongst a group from Prison Block 17 summoned by the camp loudspeaker to the "Tower Block" on 9 September 1944 and not seen again.

On 17 April 1944 Steele was promoted to the rank of captain while in captivity, he was reported to have "Died whilst prisoner of war in German hands 14 September 1944" but was later reclassified "Killed in Action"

== Awards ==
The Statutes of the Order of the British Empire do not allow for posthumous awards but Major General Colin Gubbins head of SOE wished Steele to be awarded an MBE and on 9 June 1945 placed in writing his wish for that to happen because at the time of the original recommendation the British authorities did not know that Steele had been killed. He was over-ruled and only allowed to recommend a Posthumous Mention in Despatches. Gubbins made recommendations for two Posthumous Mention in Despatches awards for Steele, on 15 May 1945 and on 10 July 1945 but only one was allowed through the system.

Gubbins's nomination for Steele's "mention in despatches" on 23 August 1945 stated:

This officer was parachuted into FRANCE in June 1943 as W/T operator to an organiser in the MARSEILLE area. He carried out this difficult and dangerous task for nearly a year, and handled about 400 messages.

He was arrested by the Gestapo in April 1944 and was executed at BUCHENWALD concentration camp on 14 September 1944.

For his courage and outstanding devotion to duty, it is recommended that this officer be Mentioned in Despatches (Posthumously).

— Major General Colin Gubbins

Steele was a posthumous Mention in Despatches by the British government in the London Gazette 28 February 1946.

Steele was also awarded a Croix de Guerre 1939-1945 avec Palme by the French government, the citation for which was issued on 16 January 1946 by L'Ordre de l'Armée.

== Commemoration ==
Arthur Steele has no grave so is commemorated by name on the Brookwood Memorial in Surrey, and amongst the 104 agents of the SOE "F Section" on the Memorial at Valençay in France. and on the British Forces Roll of Honour.

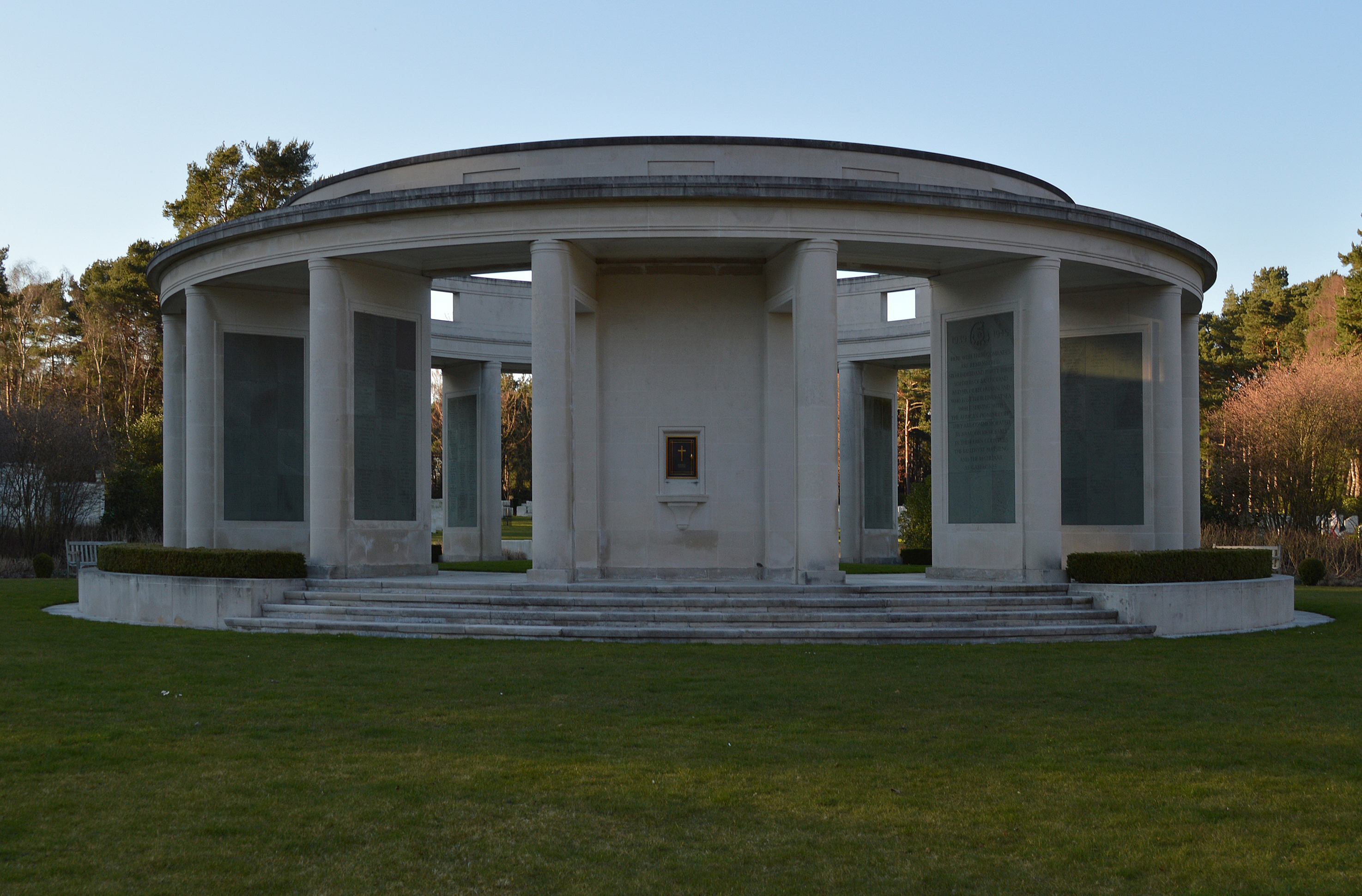
The Brookwood Memorial, built in 1958 and designed by Ralph Hobday

There is a commemorative plaque on the street-level floor of the apartment building at 8 Rue Mérentié where Steele, Charles Skepper and Eliane Plewman were captured in March 1944.

At Buchenwald a plaque was inaugurated on 15 October 2010 which honours the memory of the Allied officers murdered between September 1944 and March 1945 including twenty agents of SOE, one of those named is Captain Arthur Steele.

== Notes ==
See also SOE F Section networks
