= Wilhelm Backhaus =

German pianist (1884–1969)

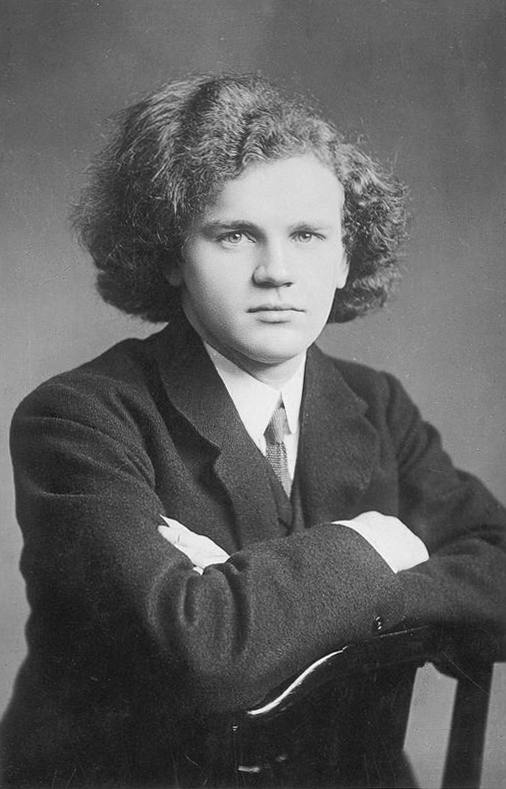
Wilhelm Backhaus, 1907

Wilhelm Backhaus ('Bachaus' on some record labels) (26 March 1884 – 5 July 1969) was a German pianist and pedagogue. He was particularly well known for his interpretations of Mozart, Beethoven, Schumann, Chopin and Brahms. He was also much admired as a chamber musician.

== Musical biography ==
Born in Leipzig, Backhaus was the son of a well-known architect. He began learning piano at the age of four with his mother, an amateur pianist. The boy's talent was soon recognized by Arthur Nikisch, at whose recommendation Backhaus studied under Alois Reckendorf at the Leipzig Conservatory between 1891 and 1899, then took private piano lessons with Eugen d'Albert in Frankfurt. As a boy of 9 or 10 he was taken to hear both of the Brahms piano concertos performed by d'Albert — and conducted by Brahms himself.

He made his first concert tour at the age of sixteen. In 1900 he went to England and in 1901 played for the first time in Manchester at the Gentleman's Concerts. In 1902 he performed at the Hallé Concerts, and thereafter in 12 concerts at the Queen's Hall, London, and played 6 different piano concertos at the Promenade Concerts. In 1904 he became Professor of Piano at the Royal Manchester College of Music. In 1905 he won the Anton Rubinstein Competition, with Béla Bartók taking second place. He toured widely throughout his life - in 1921 he gave seventeen concerts in Buenos Aires in less than three weeks. Backhaus made his U.S. debut on 5 January 1912 as soloist in Beethoven's 5th Piano Concerto (the "Emperor") with Walter Damrosch and the New York Symphony Orchestra. He taught at the Curtis Institute of Music in 1926. In 1930, he moved to Lugano and became a citizen of Switzerland. He died in Villach in Austria, where he was due to play in a concert. His last recital a few days earlier in Ossiach was recorded.

== Role in Nazi Germany ==
Although Backhaus and his wife had become Swiss citizens in 1931, he maintained an active career in Germany. After the seizure of power by the Nazis, Backhaus met Adolf Hitler no later than May 1933, while flying with him to Munich. That same year, he became an executive advisor to the Nazi organization Kameradschaft der deutschen Künstler (Fellowship of German Artists). For the show elections of 29 March 1936, Backhaus published a statement in the magazine Die Musikwoche under the rubric of "soloist" translated as, "Nobody loves German art, and especially German music, as glowingly as Adolf Hitler…" A month later, on 20 April 1936, Hitler's 47th birthday, he gave Backhaus a professorship, and invited him that September to attend the annual Nazi party's Nuremberg Rally.

The violinist Leila Doubleday Pirani wrote that in November 1938, she attended a Backhaus concert in London (conducted by Sir Adrian Boult) with the Viennese Jewish violinist Alma Rosé, who told Pirani that Backhaus "was a great friend of the family" and took her backstage to greet the pianist after the concert; but Pirani writes that while "Boult greeted us nicely," Backhaus, upon seeing Rosé, "turned his back and walked through a passage. Alma's face twitched, and of course I realized what a shock this was to her."; Pirani called the incident "a stab in the back by this cowardly man, who for fear of his Nazi masters could not behave decently, even in London." The incident is reported by Richard Newman, who writes his "offensive behavior... may have been due to his awareness of German agents operating in London at the time..." Newman also adds that Backhaus moved to Switzerland "in opposition to the Nazi regime". However, the Backhauses had moved there in 1930 several years before the Nazis came to power.

== Recordings ==
Backhaus had a long career on the concert stage and in the recording studio. He recorded the complete piano sonatas and concertos of Beethoven and many works of Mozart and Brahms, and in 1928 he became the first pianist to record the complete Etudes of Frédéric Chopin. Backhaus' readings are still widely regarded as among the best recordings (Pearl 9902 and others) of those works.

Liebestraum No. 3 in A-flat major, S.541-3 (Liszt)
Backhaus's performance in 1923 of Liebesträume No. 3 by Franz Liszt, in London (3:58)

In two groups of sessions in 1932 and 1936, he recorded a series of selected small Brahms piano works, as a connected project for His Master's Voice, including a 1936 recording of Brahms's Waltzes, Op. 39. His recordings of the complete Beethoven sonatas, made in the 1950s and '60s, display exceptional technique for a man in his seventies (Decca 433882), as do the two Brahms concertos from about the same time (Decca 433895). His live Beethoven recordings are in some ways even better, freer and more vivid (Orfeo 300921). On the other hand, his playing was sometimes accused of being "mechanical" and "lacking in insight."

His chamber recordings include Brahms's cello sonatas with Pierre Fournier, and Schubert's Trout Quintet with the International Quartet and Claude Hobday.

The Times praised Backhaus in its 1969 obituary for having upheld the classical German music tradition of the Leipzig Conservatory. His phenomenal transposing powers spawned many anecdotes: finding the piano a semitone too low at a rehearsal of Grieg's A minor Concerto, he simply played it in B-flat minor — and then in the original A minor at the concert after the instrument had been correctly tuned.

Backhaus was quick to recognize the importance of recordings. His drastically abridged 1909 recording of the first and third movements of the Grieg Piano Concerto, lasting about six minutes in total, was not only the first recording of that work, but also the first recording of any concerto. He recorded it complete, and magnificently, in the early 1930s.

At the time of his death, Backhaus had nearly completed his second complete Beethoven sonata cycle. All that was missing was the Hammerklavier Sonata.
