= Baumettes Prison =

Prison in Marseille, France

Coordinates: 43°14′0″N 5°24′50″E

Baumettes Prison (also known as the Centre pénitentiaire de Marseille) is a prison in the 9th arrondissement of Marseille.

== Location ==
The prison is named after the district of Les Baumettes. It is located at 239, chemin de Morgiou, in the 9th arrondissement of Marseille. This area was outside the city but has been absorbed as the city expanded.

== History ==
It was built from 1933 to 1939. It contains sculptures designed by Antoine Sartorio. It opened in 1936, as three inner city jails were closed down.

The prison covers some 30,000 m^{2}. It contains 1,380 cells housing approximately 1,700 prisoners, mostly men, around a quarter of whom are not French. The site includes a unit for juvenile offenders, another for female prisoners, and a prison hospital.

A 10-year renovation project started in 2006. The project will cost approximately €133 million to improve standards of hygiene, safety and security. The first phase, from 2006 to 2010, involved renovations to the main entrances, watchtowers, visiting rooms, and the construction of a new mess hall and workshops. The prisoners' accommodation was renovated from 2009.

Three of the last four executions in France took place in Baumettes: Ali Benyanès in 1973, Christian Ranucci on 28 July 1976 and the last, Hamida Djandoubi, on 10 September 1977.

In January 2015, La Provence revealed that pictures of inmates with "cash, dope and mobile phones" were uploaded to a Facebook page. After the page was closed down by the authorities, another page was created, with similar pictures, but hooded inmates. Prison wardens admitted they were understaffed. Politician Eric Ciotti called for a "Marshall Plan" for French prisons.

== Notable inmates ==
- Anne Beaumanoir (1923–2022), neuropsychologist; sentenced for supporting the FLN
- Robert Bonnaud (1929–2013), historian; jailed for supporting Algerian nationalists; served two months
- Charles Debbasch (1937–2022), jurist; sentenced to two years for several charges
- Hamida Djandoubi (1949–1977), murderer; executed at the prison
- Louisette Ighilahriz (born 1936), writer; captured and sent to several prisons
- Georges Journois (1896–1944), French resistance fighter; was evacuated to Belfort
- Albert Millet (1929–2007), serial killer; served some of his sentence at the prison
- Jacques Trolley de Prévaux (1888–1944), navy officer; was arrested by the Gestapo and briefly held at the prison
- Christian Ranucci (1954–1976), murderer; executed at the prison
- Lucian Sarti, Corsican gangster, imprisoned on charges of theft, violence and illegal possession of a firearm in 1960.
- Charles Skepper (1905–c.1944), SOE operative; was tortured at the prison
- Arthur Steele (1921–1944), SOE operative; was tortured at the prison
- Irene Wosikowski (1910–1944), activist; released in 1941
