= Albert Millet =

French serial killer

- Born: Albert Pierre Millet; 2 July 1929; Hyères, France
- Died: 19 November 2007 (aged 78); Hyères, France
- Cause of death: Self-inflicted gunshot wound
- Other names: "The Boar of the Moors"; Pierrot
- Conviction: Murder (2 counts)
- Penalty: Death; commuted to life and then to 20 years (Maggiorana)

Details
- Victims: 3
- Span of crimes: 1954–2007
- Country: France
- State: Provence-Alpes-Côte d'Azur
- Date apprehended: N/A
- Imprisoned at: N/A

Albert Pierre Millet (2 July 1929 – 19 November 2007) was a French serial killer. Known as The Boar of the Moors (French: Le sanglier des Maures), he killed three people on three occasions between 1954 and 2007, each of which was a result of his being released from prison early. He committed suicide shortly after committing his final murder.

== Early life ==
Albert Millet was born on 2 July 1929, in Hyères. He had a tumultuous childhood, as he was frequently beaten by his alcoholic father and was neglected by his mother, who preferred to spend time with her lover than with her family. At the age of 14, Millet dropped out of school and instead spent most of his time in the ruined castle overlooking his hometown, as well as the maquis that surrounded the area. After he started committing thefts, he would usually hide there to avoid arrest.

In the early 1950s, he was sent to Tataouine, French Tunisia as part of his mandatory military service, where he was a sniper. He did not cease committing thefts during his stay there, and acquired additional convictions for assaulting a fellow officer and illegally possessing a weapon of war. On 5 June 1951, he was imprisoned for attempting to shoot at an Algerian teenager with a rifle.

== First murder and imprisonment ==
By the beginning of 1954, Millet had returned to Hyères and soon met 15-year-old Paulette Dogliotti at a ballroom, with whom he fell madly in love. Dogliotti, who was brought up by her aunt, Élisa Maggiorana, worked as a house servant, and every evening at 9 PM, Millet would wait in front of her employers' house when she was carrying the metal dustbin to put on the sidewalk. While Dogliotti herself had no problem with seeing Millet, her aunt disapproved of their relationship due to his obsession with weaponry, his criminal convictions and her niece's young age. She eventually forbid them from seeing one another, with Dogliotti deciding to respect her decision.

In March of that year, Maggiorana was at a bar with her fiancé when Millet suddenly entered and called her out, with the woman warning him to stay away from Paulette. Their conversation eventually erupted into an argument which resulted in Millet being slapped in front of everyone before being thrown out of the establishment by Maggiorana's fiancé. After getting back up, he calmly threatened to kill both her and Dogliotti, before leaving. On 3 April, at about 5 PM, Maggiorana and Dogliotti were sitting near a bus stop in front of the Aux Dames de France store when Millet crossed the street, went straight towards her and shot the former in the head, killing the woman instantly. After this, he fled towards the maquis and hid out until the next day, when authorities caught him near the train station and shot him three times.

Despite falling into a coma, Millet miraculously survived his injuries and was later charged with murder and attempted murder, for which he potentially faced the death penalty. His trial began at the cour d'assises in Draguignan on 30 September 1955, with him being defended by Aymé Perrimond. Millet openly admitted to the killing, but claimed that it was not premeditated, asserting that he had shot at the garbage can to scare Dogliotti, claiming that if he had actually tried to kill her, he would not have missed. Concerning Maggiorana, he claimed that he wanted her to accompany him to the police station so she could withdraw her complaint, but she supposedly started screaming the moment she saw him, which made him panic and shoot her instead.

His explanation was not believed, and Millet was subsequently convicted on all counts and sentenced to death. While awaiting execution at Baumettes Prison, he appealed his sentence to the Court of Cassation, which overturned the sentence on a technicality. In March 1956, a new trial began at the cour d'assises in Nice, where Millet was resentenced to life imprisonment at a penal colony. After being shuffled between various prisons, he was finally transferred to Clairvaux Prison, then considered one of the harshest facilities in the country. During his time there, he was considered a model prisoner, which greatly contributed to the eventual reduction of his sentence to 20 years imprisonment.

== Release and second murder ==
Whilst in Clairvaux Prison, Millet frequently corresponded with the wife of one of his friends, Fernande "Nande" Valentin, a nurse's aide at the San Salvadour Hospital in Hyères who often visited him. Following her divorce, she began a romantic relationship with Millet, who was paroled on 10 July 1973, at the age of 44.

In August 1973, as promised, he married Fernande and they moved in together at a house in Hyères. Their marriage was considered relatively happy, with Millet only using firearms when he went out hunting, while Valentin kept the house clean. On his part, Millet had no job and did no chores, but sometimes did gardening and renewed his residence permit once a month. In the evenings, after finishing her shift at the hospital, Valentin would do housework to supplement their income. Over the years, Millet became possessive, suspicious and spied on his wife, as he suspected that she was cheating on him. Valentin herself complained that he pestered her for sex and prevented her from sleeping.

On 12 June 1979, Valentin told him that she no longer wanted him to sleep in the bed, but on the couch instead, as she did not want to support a husband who did almost nothing all day. She also said that she planned to give him a cheque for 20,000 francs so he could start a new life, which made him feel greatly humiliated. On the following morning, Millet stabbed his wife multiple times with a dagger, hitting her twice in the heart. After killing her, he barricaded himself inside the house, got drunk and eventually started firing shots in all directions from the bedroom window. Soon after, the house was surrounded by police, upon which Millet started throwing objects out of the window and shouting that he had killed his wife and wanted to kill himself too. After several hours of negotiations with friends and a priest, Millet surrendered and allowed himself to be taken into custody.

While in police custody, Millet stated that after killing his wife, he decided that he would shoot himself and their pet Dobermann in the maquis with a pistol. On the way, however, he changed his mind and hit his dog, which then ran away. While in custody, he asked to speak to the commissioner, whose office was on the second floor, and when he was allowed to, he attempted to commit suicide by jumping from the landing onto the police station's stairwell but was apprehended before he could do it. As part of the investigation, the police opened Valentin's locker at her workplace, where they found drafts of a break-up letter addressed to an undisclosed lover. Soon after, Millet was charged with her murder. A few days later, the corpse of Millet's Dobermann was discovered with a rope tied around its neck near a well by a shepherd, who held off on reporting it because he was afraid of Millet.

=== Valentin murder trial ===
On 11 May 1981, Millet's trial began at the cour d'assises in Draguignan. Valentin's family asserted that it was not logical for the dog to have run away and it likely would have taken refuge at their house and defended its mistress from Millet. They were convinced that he had killed beforehand and therefore had planned the killing of his wife in advance. The jurors, however, were not convinced, and instead found him guilty of murder, for which he was sentenced to life imprisonment.

During his time in prison, Millet again proved to be a model prisoner, due to which he succeeded in having his sentence commuted to 25 years imprisonment. He was not subjected to any psychiatric examination while serving his term, and amassed a fortune of 300,000 francs from the work he did inside the prison. In 1999 and 2000, Millet was granted furlough on three occasions, during which he stayed at a small hotel room in Nice. In June 2001, during his fourth furlough, he met a woman named Gisèle, who was 18 years his junior, at the terrace of a café. He confided to her his entire criminal career, but despite this, Gisèle accepted him, revealing that she lived off her disability pension and spent most of her money at a casino, due to which she was in debt. She then invited him to spend the night at her two-room apartment in Hyères, which he accepted. Five days later, he returned to prison.

== Release and attempted murder ==
On 20 December 2001, Millet was paroled from prison and immediately moved into Gisèle's apartment. According to her, he gave her numerous gifts, lots of money and frequently demanded sex, which she appreciated at first, although she was the only one who did the chores. In January 2002, Millet's probation officer became concerned at the rate at which his savings were disappearing and feared that Millet was being swindled. When asked, Millet replied that he was perfectly aware and was doing this by his own volition. He then contacted Thierry Perrimond, the son of his first lawyer, and entrusted his personal fortune to him, which Perrimond placed in a safe at a bank in Toulon. They did not remain there for long, as Perrimond soon returned them.

In February 2002, Millet grew possessive and constantly watched over Gisèle, with her eventually deciding to end their relationship. In an attempt to convince her to stay, he said to her that he had hidden a treasure in the maquis near Hyères consisting of twelve gold bars, which he said he was willing to give away in exchange for her staying with him. Intrigued by his offer, Gisèle said that she first needed to see it for herself. On 12 February, the pair travelled by train to Hyères, with Millet buying an ice axe along the way. They then travelled by cab to a deserted area and Millet scraped the ground with the axe. While he was doing that, Gisèle realized that he could easily kill her and quickly fled towards the road and hitched a ride. The driver took both of them to the train station, from where they travelled to Nice, where Gisèle ultimately abandoned him.

On the following day, Millet contacted Gisèle again, offering her 10,000 francs if they got together again. She accepted, but told him to leave only four days later, which Millet refused to do. On 18 February 1while Gisèle was still in bed, Millet attempted to stab her with a kitchen knife, managing to cut her under the chin. After a brief fight, Millet backed off and left after Gisèle told him to get out, whereupon she called an ambulance and was driven to the Saint-Roch Hospital. An examination proved the injury to be minor. Shortly afterwards, Millet went to the hospital to learn of Gisèle's condition, before turning himself in at the probation officer's office, claiming that the attack was not pre-planned. Regardless of his intentions, Millet was charged with attempted murder. His trial took place the following year, and Millet was convicted and sentenced to 7 years imprisonment. He unsuccessfully attempted to appeal the decision, and when the original conviction was upheld, he spent the following 5 1/2 years behind bars before he was paroled in August 2007.

== Final murder and suicide ==
Now aged 78 and with 30,000 euro in savings, Millet moved into a hotel in Hyères, where he soon took notice of a female neighbour named Chantal. After learning that she was depressed and had financial issues, Millet offered to move in with her, pay her rent and even buy her gifts. On one occasion, he offered to take her out to a restaurant, but he quickly became upset at the fact that a male friend of Chantal, 41-year-old Christian Fernandez, visited their shared apartment almost every day. After offering Fernandez a meal, for which Millet had to pay, the pair got into an argument which ended with Millet demanding that she reimburse him for the money he had spent for her, which amounted to several thousands of euros.

On 18 November 2007, Millet was spending time at Chantal's apartment, demanding that they be left alone, but Chantal did not listen and invited Fernandez over. Throughout the night, Millet repeatedly went to bed but had to get up multiple times to complain about the noise. During the early hours of the following morning, Millet went downstairs where he was invited to have a drink with Fernandez. Seemingly insulted by the offer, he abruptly left, saying that he would return armed, a threat which Fernandez did not take seriously. Sometime later, Millet returned and calmly knocked on the door, asking to be let in. After Chantal opened the door, he shot her in the thigh, causing Fernandez to run over to assist her, only to be fatally shot three times in turn.

Following the shooting, Millet ran towards the maquis in an attempt to hide himself. Apparently realizing that he was too old to be able to escape the police on foot, Millet turned the gun on himself and shot the gun. The shot proved fatal, and the cause of death was ruled as a suicide.

== List of known victims ==
Date	Identity	Age	Place
28 March 1954	Paulette Dogliotti	15	Hyères
3 April 1954	Élisa Maggiorana	27	Hyères
13 June 1979	Fernande Valentin	in the forties	Hyères
18 February 2007	Gisèle	in the fifties	Nice
19 November 2007	Chantal	in the fifties	Hyères
19 November 2007	Christian Fernandez	41	Hyères

== See also ==
- List of serial killers by country

== Bibliography ==
- Didier Fabre, The bloody trajectory of Albert Millet, the other Pierrot the madman, Presses du Midi, October 2011 ISBN 2-8127-0283-4

== Documentaries ==
- "Albert Millet, The wild boar of the Moors" on December 11, 2011, and December 16, 2012, in "Get the accused" presented by Frédérique Lantieri on France 2.

== Radio shows ==
- "Albert Millet, the Boar of the Moors" November 26, 2014 in L'Heure du crime of Jacques Pradel on RTL
- "Albert Millet, the boar of the Moors" November 15, 2016 in Hondelatte tells presented by Christophe Hondelatte on Europe 1
