= Léner Quartet =

String quartet of Hungarian origin

The Léner String Quartet, sometimes written the Lehner String Quartet, was a string quartet of Hungarian origin, founded in Budapest in 1918, which for most of its pre-war career operated in or from London. They appeared at the Royal Albert Hall, London on three occasions between 1922 and 1926. They also performed in New York, Amsterdam, and elsewhere in Europe. The Léner made the first complete recorded cycle of Beethoven quartets.

== Personnel ==
The founding lineup of the Quartet, which lasted until their break-up at the start of World War II, was as follows:

1st violin

- Jenö Léner (or Lehner)

2nd violin

- Joszef Smilovits

Viola

- Sándor Roth

Cello

- Imre Hartmann

In later manifestations of the ensemble, Paul Rolland (viola) and Laszlo Varga (cello) were players in the Léner Quartet.

== Origins ==
Jenö Léner was born at Szabadka, Hungary (later annexed to Yugoslavia), on 24 June 1894. He studied at the Royal High School for Music in Budapest. He founded the quartet in 1918 and was its leader.

== Recordings ==
The Léner Quartet recorded extensively during the 1920s and 1930s for Columbia Records in the UK, a partnership which received a strong impetus from the centenary of Beethoven's death in 1927, when a core of the Beethoven quartets were recorded or begun (L series). This was followed up in 1928 with the Schubert centenary, for which the Léner recorded the Octet. The LX prefix records below were mainly issued between 1933 and 1936. Their principal recordings of complete works (all 78 rpm Columbia) in that period are as follows:

- Beethoven, op 18 nos 1 & 4 (L 1842-1847); op 18 nos 2 & 3 (L 1901-1914); op 18 no 6 (L 1915-1917).
- Beethoven, op 59 no 1 (L 1837-1841); op 59 no 2 (L 1856-1859); op 59 no 3 (L 1860-1863); op 74 (LX 319-322).
- Grosse Fuge Opus 133 by Ludwig van Beethoven, recorded by the Lener Quartet in 1927. First published recording of this piece
  Beethoven, op 95 (L 1926-1928); op 127 (L 1921-1925); op 130 (L1929-1933); op 131 (LX 294-298); op 132 (LX 463-467); Grosse Fuge op 133 (LX 103-104); op 135 (L 1918-1920).
- Beethoven: Septet in E flat major op 20 (Léner, Roth and Hartmann with Claude Hobday (bass), Charles Draper (clarinet), E.W. Hinchcliffe (bassoon), Aubrey Brain (French horn)). (LX 109-113). (Before 1933).
- Haydn: op 3 no 5 (9658-9659); op 76 no 3 (LX 451-4); op 76 no 5 (L 2257-2259). (Before 1933).
- Mozart: Quartet in D minor K421 (L 1965-1967); in B flat major K458 (L 2261-2263); in G major K387 (LX 24-27); in C Major ("Dissonant") K465. (all before 1933).
- Mozart: Quintet in G minor K516, with L. d'Oliveira, viola (LX 61-64). (Before 1933).
- Mozart: Quintet in A major K581, with Charles Draper, clarinet (L 2252-2255). (Before 1933).
- Mozart: Quartet in F major K370, with Léon Goossens, oboe (LX 256-257). (Before 1933).
- Schubert: Octet in F major op 166, with Claude Hobday (bass), Charles Draper (clarinet), E.W. Hinchcliffe (bassoon), Aubrey Brain (French horn). (L 2108-2113). (For Schubert centenary 1928).
- Schumann: Quintet in E flat major op 44, with Mme Olga Loeser-Lebert, piano (LX 266-269).
- Brahms: Quartet in C minor op 51 no 1 (LX 228-31); in A minor op 51 no 2 (LX 163-166); in B flat op 67 (L 2357-2361). (all before 1933).
- Brahms: Quintet in F minor op 34, with Mme Olga Loeser-Lebert, piano (L 2040-2044). (Before 1933).
- Brahms: Quintet in B minor op 115, with Charles Draper, clarinet (L 2228-2232). (Before 1933).
- Dvořák: Quartet in F op 96 (LX 183-185). (Before 1933).
- Dvořák: Quintet in A major, with Mme Olga Loeser-Lebert, piano (LX 150-153). (Before 1933).
- Debussy: Quartet in G minor op 10 no 1 (L 2141-2144). (1928-03-15).
- Ravel: Quartet in F major (LX 270-273). (Before 1936).

Rockport Records (New York) began in 1999 a project to reissue all their recordings on CD. By 2015 5 CDs had been issued, covering Haydn, Mozart, Schubert, Schumann, and Dvořák.

== Sources and literature ==
- R.D. Darrell, The Gramophone Shop Encyclopedia of Recorded Music (New York 1936).
- Arthur Eaglefield Hull, A Dictionary of Modern Music and Musicians (Dent, London 1924).
- A. Glazounow (foreword), The Music Lovers Gramophone Library, Vol I, Schubert centenary issue of Columbia Records. (Columbia Graphophone Co, London 1928).
- Catalogue of Columbia Records up to and including Supplement no 252 (Columbia, London 1933)
- Antal Molnár, 'A Léner-Vonósnégyes,' in Nagy Magyar Elöadómüvészek, no 6. (Budapest, Zenemökiadó 1968).
