= Frédéric Bonnaud =

French actor, film critic, journalist and radio host

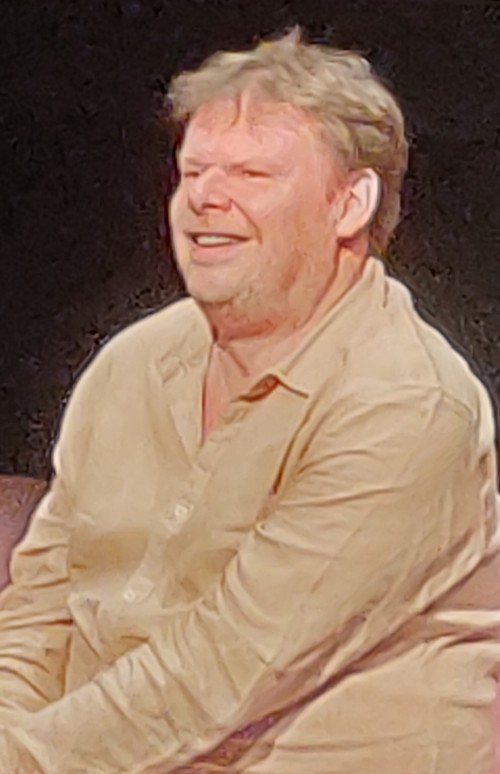

Frédéric Bonnaud (born 27 June 1967) is the head of the Cinémathèque française and a French journalist. He was the head of Les Inrockuptibles from 2013 to 2015.

== Biography ==
After starting his career as a cinema programmer in Paris, he became a cinema critic at Les Inrockuptibles. In 2006, he was offered to create a radio show on the French public radio France Inter. Quickly gaining public and critical praise, the show was nonetheless removed from antennas a year later, triggering an intense polemic and a strike of the journalists of Radio France.

In August 2009, he joined Guillaume Durand on France 2 to participate in his program the subject of the scandal. He also holds on Europe 1 a daily chronicle dedicated to television.

He continued his journalistic career, featuring in TV and radio shows, before taking the head of Les Inrocks in 2013 and being nominated by the President of the Republic as the head of La cinémathèque française in December 2015.

He is the son of Robert Bonnaud.
