= Auguste Ricord =

French mobster (1911–1985)

Auguste Joseph Ricord, nicknamed Il Commandante, (26 April 1911 – 1985) was a French-Corsican heroin trafficker, convicted Nazi collaborator, and one of the founding members of the French Connection, a mafiosi-type organisation involved in heroin trade, based in France in the 1950s and 1960s. After the liberation, Ricord fled the country. He was sentenced to death in absentia.

An agent of Henri Lafont, a member of the Carlingue (French auxiliaries of the Gestapo), under the Vichy regime, he used part of the funds stolen by the Carlingue during the war to create drug laboratories near Marseille. Heroin was refined there before being exported to the US.

On 19 April 1968, Ricord was arrested along with fellow Corsicans Lucien Sarti and François Chiappe for questioning regarding the robbery of a branch of the National Bank of Argentina. The three were released due to lack of evidence.

Auguste Ricord was arrested in 1972 in Asunción, Paraguay. Corsican influence was believed to have been behind the U.S.'s difficulties in extraditing him. He was eventually extradited to the United States, where he was sentenced to 22 years in prison on federal drug trafficking charges. He served 10 years in prison until being released. Ricord returned to Paraguay in 1983, and died of an illness two years later.
