= Lucien Sarti =

French drug trafficker (1937–1972)

Lucien Sarti (8 October 1937 – 28 April 1972) was a French drug trafficker. Sarti was shot to death in Mexico in 1972 in a drug trafficking ring raid.

== Drug smuggling ==
On 8 May 1960 he was arrested and imprisoned in Baumettes, Marseille for theft, violence and illegal possession of a firearm. Later Sarti, on the run after murdering a Belgian policeman, fled Europe. In 1966 he arrived in South America to get involved in narcotics trafficking. In Buenos Aires, Argentina he was involved with a criminal group led by the Corsican Auguste Ricord.

On 19 April 1968, Sarti was arrested along with Ricord and François Chiappe for questioning regarding the robbery of a branch of the National Bank of Argentina. The three were released due to lack of evidence. Subsequent to Ricord's March 1971 imprisonment in Paraguay, Sarti and his associate Christian David moved to Ilhabela, an island off the coast of Brazil. They stayed in the small hotel Bordelao, owned by friends of Helena Ferreira, his Brazilian mistress. Sarti and Helena were arrested in January 1972 on suspicions of passing counterfeit currency, although they were soon released. In February of that year Sarti, Tommaso Buscetta and associates met with Carlo Zippo, an American mafia representative from New York. They gathered at the Copacabana Palace hotel and came up with a new network and buyer system. Not long after Sarti moved to Mexico City, set to be the transit point of the network. In early 1972 Sarti and his wife travelled to La Paz, Bolivia in the company of his friend Jean-Paul Angeletti and the Argentine businessman Housep Caramian, reportedly to buy a 6000 acre plantation on which to grow cocoa leaves and expand from heroin to cocaine trafficking. He was arrested there in possession of $380,000 held in a case after a bellhop recognized Sarti from a previous visit and recalled he had been there under a different name.

In April 1972, Sarti was shot to death in Mexico City during a raid of a drug trafficking ring by the Mexican federal police. A detective in Rio de Janeiro was later suspended from the police force after being accused of accepting a bribe to free Sarti and his girlfriend Helena Ferreira from jail earlier in 1972. In January 1975, four French citizens alleged to have supplied heroin to Sarti were among a group of 19 indicted by a federal grand jury in Brooklyn. After his shooting Sarti's pilot Julio Lujan brought 90kg of heroin which Sarti had on hand to Uruguay, while his associates tried to find approximately 100kg of heroin he had stached in hidden locations.

== Allegations of involvement in the assassination of John F. Kennedy ==
=== The Murderers of John F. Kennedy and The Men Who Killed Kennedy ===
In November 1988, Steve J. Rivele's French-published book The Murderers of John F. Kennedy named Sarti as one of three French (Corsican) gangsters involved in the assassination of John F. Kennedy. Rivele claimed Sarti fired the fatal shot from Dealey Plaza's "grassy knoll." According to Rivele, Sarti, Roger Bocagnani, and Sauveur Pironti were contracted by organized crime in the United States to protect its drug interests. The British two-hour television special The Men Who Killed Kennedy was based on Rivele's book, but preceded its release airing on October 25, 1988. In the French newspaper Le Provençal published the day following the special, Pironti denied the allegation, stating that he believed at the time of the assassination that Sarti was held in Marseille's Baumettes Prison and that Bocagnani was in Bordeaux's Fort du Hâ. He also showed the paper military records proving that he was serving on a minesweeper from October 1962 to April 1964. The French Ministry of Justice stated that Bocagnani was in prison on the day of Kennedy's assassination and officials from the French Navy confirmed Pironti's military service.

=== E. Howard Hunt ===
After the death of E. Howard Hunt in 2007, Howard St. John Hunt and David Hunt stated that their father had recorded several claims about himself and others being involved in a conspiracy to assassinate John F. Kennedy. In the April 5th, 2007 issue of Rolling Stone, Howard St. John Hunt detailed a number of individuals purported to be implicated by his father including Sarti, as well as Lyndon B. Johnson, Cord Meyer, David Phillips, Frank Sturgis, David Morales, and William Harvey. The two sons alleged that their father cut the information from his memoirs, American Spy: My Secret History in the CIA, Watergate and Beyond, to avoid possible perjury charges. According to Hunt's widow and other children, the two sons took advantage of Hunt's loss of lucidity by coaching and exploiting him for financial gain. The Los Angeles Times said they examined the materials offered by the sons to support the story and found them to be "inconclusive."

== See also ==
- French Connection
