= Charles Debbasch =

French jurist and academic (1937–2022)

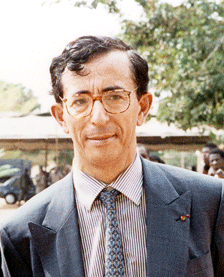
Charles Debbasch in Togo in 1994

Charles Debbasch (22 October 1937 – 8 January 2022), was a French jurist and academic.

== Biography ==
=== Academic ===
He graduated with a degree in law at 24 and then taught administrative law and political institutions at Paul Cézanne University for more than forty years. He was also a professor at the College of Europe and in foreign faculties. He has authored works on administrative law and constitutional law.

Charles Debbasch founded the specialist field of media law in France.

As dean of the faculty of law at Aix-Marseille, he was one of the founders of Paul Cézanne University (of which he was president). He has supervised numerous theses. He also directed a laboratory of CNRS, where he was a director and administrative council member.

=== Public roles ===
A specialist in state functions and institutions, Charles Debbasch has exercised numerous public functions. He was employed by Edgar Faure, minister of education after the university crisis of May 1968, and then was an advisor for education and culture to Valéry Giscard d'Estaing during his seven-year rule.

He was involved in the art world and initiated the creation of the Museum of Yves Brayer in Baux-de-Provence.

He was also employed in the media, serving successively as Vice-President of FR3, Director-General and then President of Le Dauphiné libéré. He established several radio stations in Rhône-Alpes and Provence, which were subsequently integrated into the Skyrock and Fun Radio networks.

Charles Debbasch also made an incursion into politics in the 1983 French municipal elections: he stood in Aix-en-Provence, obtaining 5.77% of the vote.

=== Fondation Vasarely Affair ===
As dean of the faculty of law at Aix-en-Provence and President of Paul Cézanne University, professor Debbasch was chosen by the university to take on the presidency of the Fondation Vasarely. With the agreement of the administrative council he held the role from 1981 until 1992.

After the death of Claire Vasarely, wife of the painter, Vasarely's heirs took control of the organisation and called the role of Debbasch into question. In 1993 they obtained a judicial annulment of his administrative mandate. They also sought criminal proceedings against him.

In November 1994, when he appeared to give a press conference at the University of Aix-en-Provence on the Vasarely affair, the police arrived and attempted to challenge Debbasch's attempt to avail himself of a Letter rogatory. Alleging that the police had attempted to enter his vehicle by force without a permit, he ensconced himself in his faculty office under the guard of a group of students devoted to his cause. The judge La Gallo granted a summons on 27 November 1994. He was arrested on 28 November 1994 and detained at Baumettes Prison, where he continued to be imprisoned in provisional detention until 15 February.

Brought before the criminal court on charges of fraud, forgery and breach of trust, Charles Debbasch was condemned on 20 February 2002. This condemnation was essentially confirmed by the Aix-en-Provence court of appeal, which dismissed the charge of fraud but retained the other two charges. The judgment was annulled the next year, but only in the aspects relating to forgery; it was definitive concerning the condemnation of Debbasch for breach of trust and in requiring civil reparations for the amount he owed (€405,000 on his sole charge and €214,028 jointly with Pierre Lucas who was condemned along with him). After this partial overturning of the decision, the case went before the Court of Appeal of Aix-en-Provence, which condemned Charles Debbasch solely on the charge of breach of trust on 11 May 2005, sentencing him to two years in prison, including one year of suspended in exchange for three years probation, along with a fine of €150,000 and a five-year abrogation of certain civic, civil and family rights.

Vincent Hugeux indicates that this was not Charles Debbasch's first legal trouble. According to him, he was also convicted in 1980, by the Court of Appeal of Paris for counterfeiting – he had published the same legal treatise with two different publishing houses. Finally, Le Monde made an inquiry concerning a suspicious deposit of 1.2 million euros in cash in a Luxumbourgish account, which was then transferred to three trusts based in Niue, an investigation which resulted in an indictment for "money laundering and fraudulent organisation of insolvency.". Debbasch denied that the transactions were in any way fraudulent, declaring that the funds were not linked to the Vasarely affair but reflected fees paid for his assistance to the Republic of Togo and the Embassy of Togo to the Benelux. This was duly confirmed by the Togolese treasury.

=== Africa ===
He advised numerous African Heads of State and edited several African constitutions. At the direction of King Hassan II he directed a group of jurists in Morocco from 1981 to 1985 charged with training the crown prince, now Muhammed VI in comparative law. He also served in an advisory role in Côte d'Ivoire for presidents Félix Houphouët-Boigny and Henri Konan Bédié. At the end of the 1990s, he advised Omar Bongo, President of Gabon and was contracted by the Republic of Congo to help edit their new constitution. He later received Togolese citizenship. After serving on the legal council of Togolese President Eyadema, he became a Special Advisor to the Togolese Head of State Faure Gnassingbé – a position which he retains to this day. Asked by the newspaper La Croix in 2007 about the advisability of retaining a man condemned by French law as an advisor, Faure Gnassingbé was explicit in responding that "It is not within the African worldview to rid oneself of anyone who has long been loyal.".

His detractors accuse him of being the "inspiration – if not the author" of the Togolese Constitution, but he denies this and insists on putting his role in perspective. He appeared to play a crucial role in the "constitutional coup d'État" by which Faure Gnassingbé succeeded his father, general Eyadéma, who had ruled Togo for thirty-eight years, in February 2005, in an affair in which it is difficult to separate fact from journalistic exaggeration.

In the media, Debbasch has been termed a "white collar mercenary."

=== Since 2005 ===
Debbasch has been mentioned in the media on several occasions for several reasons.

Firstly, in the Marseilles press: Marseille l'Hebdo reported in 2006 that Charles Debbasch had continued to receive his salary as a university professor although he was resident in Togo, since he had was responsible for the University of Aix-Marseille's co-operative exchanges with the Universities of Lomé and Kara. According to the author of the article, sources close to the President of the University admitted that "all the world knows that these exchanges are completely fictional" and that it was "a political decision that had been made at a higher level.".

On 16 May 2007, Charles Debbasch was arrested at Brussels airport, where he was preparing to depart for Lomé, and was placed under court supervision with a ban on leaving Belgium. This affair was quickly resolved, since Charles Debbasch returned to Lomé a little over a week later.

Togolese sources defend Charles Debbasch, who still swears that he is totally innocent of the charges laid against him, and even launching a legal counter-offensive. The website of the Togolese Republic, republicoftogo.com, reports that Charles Debbasch launched a counterattack, first by filing a complaint of fraudulent judgement and then – concerning the events in Belgium – against Michel de Bonnecorse, former advisor on African Affairs to Jacques Chirac.

In its edition of 10 May 2006, the Canard enchaîné Alain Guédé published an article (L'université française finance l'exil doré d'un condamné), mentioning the Vasarely affair once more and stating that his salary continued to be paid by the state education department (€5000 / month from 2003 to 2006) in accordance with an agreement between Paul Cézanne University (Jacques Bourdon) and Togo.

=== Personal life ===
Charles Debbasch was born in Tunisia to a European family which resettled in Aix-en-Provence at independence. He studied at the Lycée Carnot in Tunis.

He was married twice, and is now a widower. He is father of five children, including the rector of the Académie de Lyon Roland Debbasch.

Debbasch appeared to Patricia Allémonière, a journalist at TF1 who interviewed him in Togo, as a "man of the old sort of France, a little worn, bruised by the ostracism which he feels victim of in Paris." His excellent manners did not prevent him from being mischievous, even prone to school-boy puns and jokes.

Charles Debbasch very openly loved animals – Vincent Hugeux who encountered him in Kara reports his lover for the parakeet of the city's best hotel (Debbasch also mentioned the bird in the title of his 2006 book: La succession d'Eyadema : le perroquet de Kara). During the Vasarely affair, articles dedicated to Charles Debbasch regularly mentioned his Yorkshire Terrier Love, which he would carry under his arm when he encountered photo-journalists or cameramen, and later he wrote a book in tribute: Un amour de Love. Cinq ans avec mon yorkshire préféré.

== Publications ==
- L'administration au pouvoir, fonctionnaires et politiques sous la Ve République, (The Administration of Power, Duties and Politics in the 5th Republic) Calmann-Lévy – Questions d'actualité, 1970.
- L'Université désorientée, (The Confused University). PUF, 1971.
- La France de Pompidou, (Pompidou's France). PUF, 1974.
- Les Chats de l'Émirat : conte politique, (The Cats of the Emirate: A Political Tale). Sainte Victoire, 1976.
- L'État civilisé : contre le pouvoir sauvage, (The Civilised State: Against Savage Power). Fayard, 1979.
- L'Élysée dévoilé (Elysium Unveiled). Albin Michel, 1982.
- La disgrâce du socialisme, (The Disgrace of Socialism). Economica, 1985.
- La réussite politique, (Political Success). Éditions Atlas-Economica, 1987.
- La cohabitation froide, (The Cold Co-habitation) Economica, 1988.
- Mémoires du Doyen d'Aix-en-Provence, (Memoirs of the Dean of Aix-en-Provence). Jaguar-Assas Librairie, 1996.
- Une âme corse, (A Corsican Soul) La Marge, 1996.
- Un amour de Love, (A Love for Love) La Marge, 2001.
- L'avenir institutionnel de la Corse, (The Institutional Future of Corsica). La Marge, 2000.
- Droit Administratif, (Administrative Law). Economica, 2002
- Contes de nos animaux favoris, (Tales of Our Favoured Animals). La Marge, 2004.
- Chronique d'un désastre judiciaire, le scandale Vasarely, (Chronicle of a Legal Disaster, the Vasarely Affair). Colonna, 2006
- La succession d'Eyadema, (The Succession of Eyadema). L'Harmattan, 2006.
- L'entrée en Sarkozie, (The Arrival of Sarkozy). L'Harmattan, 2008.

== Bibliography ==
- Vincent Hugeux, Les Sorciers blancs : enquête sur les faux amis français de l'Afrique, Fayard, 2007, ISBN 9782213626987
