= Claude Hobday =

English double-bass player

Claude Hobday (12 May 1872, Faversham, Kent – 10 March 1954, Surbiton, England) was an English double-bass player, a member of a well-known musical family, who took part in various early chamber-music recordings.

== Biography ==
=== Early life ===
Claude Hobday was the younger brother of the violist Alfred Charles Hobday (1870–1942) and the brother-in-law of the pianist Ethel Hobday (née Sharpe).

He studied with A.C. White at the Royal College of Music in London from 1888-1892.

=== Career ===
He played in leading orchestras, including the Royal English Opera under Sir Arthur Sullivan, the Glasgow Choral Union under Augustus Manns, the Scottish Orchestra under George Henschel, in the Richter Concerts in London, in the London Symphony Orchestra as a founding member from 1904–10, and BBC Symphony Orchestra in 1930–1940, as well as joining the Beecham Symphony Orchestra from 1910–16; some say he has spent time the Royal Philharmonic Orchestra. He retired from playing in 1940. He was professor of double-bass at the Royal College of Music from 1902–46, his pupils including Adrian Beers, Ernest Ineson and Francis Baines. He was a notable collector of basses, owning instruments by Testore, Montagnana, Gasparo da Salò, Gennaro Gagliano, and Vincenzo Panormo.

Hobday was a major chamber musician, appearing in the South Place Concerts for thirty five years.

== Recordings ==
Hobday was a prolific recording artist. He appeared with members of the International Quartet (André Mangeot (violin), Frank Howard (viola) and Herbert Withers (cello)) and Wilhelm Backhaus (piano) in an early Austrian His Master's Voice recording of Schubert's Trout Quintet (GC ES 395/8, reissued in 1997 as CD Biddulph [England], LHW 038) (acoustically recorded).

He also appears with the Léner Quartet in the Columbia Records electric microphone recordings of the Beethoven Septet in E flat major and the (1928) Schubert Octet in F major, with Charles Draper (clarinet), E.W. Hinchliffe (bassoon) and Aubrey Brain (French horn).

For His Master's Voice, with the Quatuor Pro Arte, he recorded Mozart's Eine kleine Nachtmusik and, with Artur Schnabel at the piano, a second version of the Trout Quintet. He also played on the Busch Chamber Players' recordings of the Bach Brandenburg Concertos and Orchestral Suites and Mozart's Adagio and Fugue.
