= Laszlo Varga (cellist) =

Hungarian-born American cellist (1924–2014)

Laszlo Varga (December 13, 1924 – December 11, 2014) was a Hungarian-born American cellist who had a worldwide status as a soloist, recording artist, and authoritative cello teacher.

== Biography ==
As a Jew, Varga lost his position at the Budapest Symphony during WW II and was later interned by Hungarian authorities in a Nazi labor camp.

For 11 years Varga held the position as principal cellist of the New York Philharmonic under the baton of the orchestra's music directors Dimitri Mitropoulos and Leonard Bernstein, and many guest conductors including Fritz Reiner and Guido Cantelli. He performed as soloist with orchestras in countries such as Australia, Japan, USA, the former Soviet Union, and throughout Europe. In music festivals such as Aspen, Chautauqua, and Shreveport, he has been spotlighted during the last 40 years for his duties as a soloist, chamber musician and teaching mentor. During this time recorded a multitude of disks for numerous labels including Columbia, CRI, Decca, EMI, Musicelli, Period, Philips, RCA, Serenus, and Vox. Many composers throughout the world have requested that Mr. Varga give the first performance of their works.

As a chamber musician he was a member of groups such as the Borodin Piano Trio, the Canadian String Quartet, the Léner String Quartet, the Hungarian Quartet, the Trio Concertante, and the Crown Chamber Players. Indiana University awarded Varga with the title of Chevalier du Violoncelle for having dedicated his career as a teacher and soloist for the improvement of cello playing. He taught the cello at San Francisco State University (where he also taught conducting and oversaw the chamber music program), University of California, Santa Cruz, the University of Toronto and the University of Houston, from which he retired in 2000.

He has the great pleasure of having many of his students landing jobs in orchestras and in universities throughout the globe. He routinely holds master classes and performs in recitals as well as conducts large groups of cello ensembles on all sides of the globe. Many of these take place during the various international Cello Congresses. He has been the conductor of orchestras in Budapest, Hungary and San Leandro, California, as well as Festivals in Aspen, Colorado and Shreveport, Louisiana. He not only conducted the Virtuosi of New York and the Virtuosi of San Francisco but he was founder of both of them. He has arranged many works of music which are published by MusiCelli Publications. Groups such as the Yale Cellos, the Saito Cello Ensemble, CELLO for Sony/Philips, MusiCelli, the Los Angeles I Cellisti, as well as his own New York Philharmonic Cello Quartet have recorded his arrangements.

== Laszlo Varga's list of Cello Arrangements ==
=== for Solo Cello ===
BACH, Johann Sebastian

- Partita in D minor for solo cello, BWV 1004 (which includes the famous Chaconne)
- Partita in E for solo cello, BWV 1006
- Solo Cello Suite No. 4, BWV 1010 (Transposed to G Major)

BRAHMS, Johannes

- Three Violin Sonatas (Cello part only)
  - Sonata in G, Op. 78
  - Sonata in A, Op. 100
  - Sonata in d, Op. 108

=== for Cello and Piano ===
BACH, Johann Sebastian

- Toccata, Adagio, and Fuga (Originally for organ.)

BARTOK, Bela

- Sonatine (1915) (Originally for piano.)

BEETHOVEN, Ludwig van

- Sonata, Op. 64

MOZART, Wolfgang Amadeus

- Adagio, K. 261 (Originally for violin.)
- Andante, K. 467 (Originally for piano.)

SCHUBERT, Franz

- Two Songs: “Litanei” and “Aufenthalt”

SCHUMANN, Robert

- Two Songs

RAVEL, Maurice

- Tzigane

=== for Two Cellos ===
BACH, Johann Sebastian

- Fifteen Little Pieces
- Suite in C Major
- Suite No. 5, BWV 1011 in C minor for cello duo (transposed to G minor)
- Aria from Goldberg Variations

=== for Three Cellos ===
BACH, Johann Sebastian

- Two Little Preludes

=== Cello Quartets and bigger Ensembles ===
BACH, Johann Sebastian

- Chaconne in d, BWV 1004
- Prelude and Fugue VIII from Book One of the “WTC”
- Sarabande and Bourree, BWV 1002
- Suite V for solo cello, BWV 1011
- Allemande, Sarabande, Gavotte, and Gigue from Suite VI

BARTOK, Bela

- Hungarian Peasant Songs

BEETHOVEN, Ludwig van

- Quartet, Op. 14, No. 1 (Originally for piano.)
- Adagio, Op. 31, No. 2 (Originally for piano.)

BOCCHERINI, Luigi

- Adagio and Allegro (from the Cello Sonata in A)

CHOPIN, Frederic

- Etude, Op. 25, No. 7 (Originally for piano.)
- Prelude in e, Op. 28, No. 4 (Originally for piano.)

DEBUSSY, Claude

- Sarabande (from “pour le piano”)
- Prelude, “La fille aux cheveux de lin” (Originally for piano.)
- Prelude, “Minstrels” (Originally for piano.)

HAYDN, Franz Joseph

- Quartet, Op. 76, No. 5 (Originally for string quartet.)

MOOR, Emanuel

- Suite, Op 95

MOZART, Wolfgang Amadeus

- Sonata in F, K. 358 (Originally for piano.)

RIMSKY-KORSAKOV, Nicolai

- Flight of the Bumble Bee

ROSSINI, Gioacchino

- Variations “Un Larme” (Originally for cello and piano.)

VIVALDI, Antonio

- Concerto Grosso, Op. 3, No. 11

=== Cello Ensemble with Voice ===
SCHUBERT, Franz

- Two Songs for Soprano and Cello Quartet, Der Müller und der Bach and Heidenröslein

BRAHMS, Johannes

- “Ihr habt nun Traurigkeit” from Ein deutsches Requiem for mezzo soprano or solo cello and eight-part cello ensemble (with optional six-part cello choir.)

=== Solo Cello and Four Cellos or other Instruments ===
HANDEL, George Frederic

- Concerto in g for five celli or solo oboe and four celli

MOZART, Wolfgang Amadeus

- Quintet, K. 407 for oboe and four celli. (Originally for horn and strings.)

RESPIGHI, Ottorino

- Adagio con Variazioni for solo cello and cello octet

STRAUSS, Richard

- Don Quixote, Op. 32 for solo cello and viola, violin, clar./bass clar., French horn, and piano
- Sonata, Op. 6 for solo cello and 12-piece ensemble (pairs or flutes, oboes, clarinets, bassoons, horns, 1 cello, and 1 bass)

TCHAIKOVSKY, Peter Ilych

- Andante Cantabile from the String Quartet, Op. 11 for solo cello and five-part cello ensemble
