= Alfred Charles Hobday =

English viola player

Alfred Charles Hobday (19 April 1870 in Faversham – 23 February 1942 in Tankerton) was an English viola player who made his career in England. He was the elder brother of the double-bass player Claude Hobday.

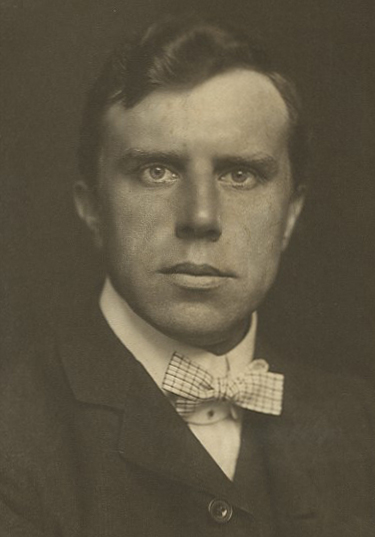
Alfred Charles Hobday

Hobday studied violin and viola at the Royal College of Music in London with Henry Holmes, and he was one of the college's earliest graduates on viola. He played in several leading string quartet musical ensembles, notably at St James's Hall, with Joseph Joachim, Lady Hallé, Ries and the cellist Alfredo Piatti. He also gave many viola recitals with his wife, the pianist Ethel Sharpe, later known as Ethel Hobday.

Much of Hobday's career was spent as an orchestral musician. In 1895 he became principal viola in Queen Victoria's private band and was awarded the Diamond Jubilee medal and Coronation medal for services as part of that group. Hobday was solo viola at the Royal Covent Garden Opera from 1900 to 1914. He was also the leading viola of the Goossens Orchestra, of the London Symphony Orchestra from its inception in 1904 until 1930, and of the orchestras of the chief festivals. He soloed with orchestras on a few occasions, most notably in several performances of Hector Berlioz's Harold in Italy.

Hobday premiered several works including Frank Bridge's Phantasy for Piano Quartet, Vaughan Williams' Four Hymns for Tenor, and String Orchestra and Vaughan Williams's Quintet in C Minor for Pianoforte, Violin, Viola, Violoncello, and Double Bass. The English composer Ernest Walker also composed works specifically for Hobday.

His name is remembered in the Musicians' Book of Remembrance in the Musician's Chapel within the Church of the Holy Sepulchre, (The Musicians' Church) in London.

== Recordings ==
Like many other prominent violists of the early twentieth century, Hobday's legacy is poorly reflected on recordings. All of his commercial recordings are limited to his playing second viola with established ensembles.

- String Sextet No. 1 (Brahms), op. 18 with Quatuor Pro Arte (Hobday, vla 2 and Anthony Pini, cello 2) 1935
- String Sextet No. 2 (Brahms), op. 36 with Budapest String Quartet (Hobday, vla 2 and Anthony Pini, cello 2) 1937
- String Quintet No. 1 (Brahms), op. 88 with Budapest String Quartet (Hobday, vla 2) 1937

External audio
- Shellac recordings of Mozart's String Quintet No. 3 and No. 4 with Alfred Charles Hobday in the Online Archive of the Österreichische Mediathek

- String Quintet No. 3 (Mozart), K. 515 with Quatuor Pro Arte (Hobday, vla 2) 1934
- String Quintet No. 3 (Mozart), K. 515 (Andante only), with Quatuor Pro Arte (Hobday, vla 2) 1931
- String Quintet No. 4 (Mozart), K. 516 with London String Quartet (Hobday, vla 2) 1917
- String Quintet No. 4 (Mozart), K. 516 with Quatuor Pro Arte (Hobday, vla 2) 1934
- String Quintet No. 5 (Mozart), K. 593 with Quatuor Pro Arte (Hobday, vla 2) 1936
