= Robert Bonnaud =

French historian (1929–2013)

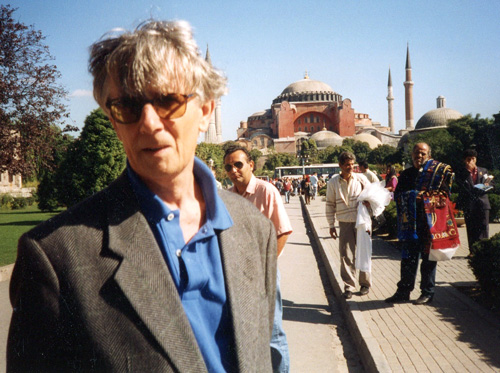
Robert Bonnaud

Robert Bonnaud (13 November 1929 – 22 January 2013) was a French anti-colonialist historian and professor of history at the Paris Diderot University.

In 1957, following the advice of his friend Pierre Vidal-Naquet, he published in Esprit an article entitled La Paix des Nementchas (Nementchas’ Peace), where he denounced massacres he witnessed made by the French army in Algeria, on 25–26 October 1956. In June 1961, he was arrested and jailed in Marseille's Baumettes prison as a supporter of the Algerian nationalists of the FLN; Hargreaves calls him "the leader of the Jeanson network in the Marseille region". In June 1962, two months after the Evian agreements and the proclamation of Algeria's independence, Bonnaud was released but suspended from all teaching duties. That restriction was lifted two years later and he was formally pardoned in 1966.

Bonnaud was born in Marseille, France. He dedicated his life to the study of universal history, and has been presented as a "meta-historian", a "philosopher of history", a theorist of the evolution of the noosphere. He died, aged 83, in Paris.

== Bibliography ==
- Victoires sur le temps. Essais comparatistes. Polybe le Grec et Siman Qian le Chinois, Condeixa: La Ligne d'ombre , 2007, ISBN 978-2-9528603-1-4
- La Cause du Sud – L'Algérie d'hier et d'aujourd'hui, la Palestine, les nations… Ecrits politiques 1956–2000, Paris: L'Harmattan, 2001, ISBN 2-7475-0200-7.
- Histoire et historiens de 1900 à nos jours : l'histoire nouvelle. Au-delà de l'histoire, Paris: Kimé, 2001 (review in Cairn
- Tournants et périodes; essai sur les durées historiques et les années récentes, Paris: Kimé, 2000.
- L'Histoire, le progrès, le communisme. Théories et confidences, Paris: Kimé, 1997.
- Et pourtant elle tourne !, Paris: Kimé, 1995.
- La morale et la raison, Paris: Kimé, 1994.
- Les Succès de l'échec. Où va l'histoire?, Paris: Arcantère, 1993.
- Les Alternances du progrès. I Une histoire sans préférences, Paris: Kimé, 1992.
- Le Système de l'histoire, Paris: Fayard, 1989.
- Les Tournants du XXe siècle – Progrès et régressions, Paris: L'Harmattan, ISBN 2-7384-1444-3.
