= Bonneau =

Bonneau is a surname. Notable people with the surname include:

- Britt Bonneau (born 1971), American college baseball coach
- Jacob Bonneau (c. 1717–1786), English artist
- Jimmy Bonneau (born 1985), Canadian ice hockey player
- Paul Bonneau (1918–1995), French composer
- Richard Bonneau, American scientist
- Stéphane Bonneau (born 1961), Canadian tennis player

== See also ==
- Bonneau, South Carolina, town in Berkeley County, South Carolina, United States
