= Canister =

Canister may refer to:

- Absorbent canister of a rebreather
  - Canister in the carbon dioxide scrubber of a rebreather
- Bear canister, or bear-resistant food storage container, used in the wilderness
- Canister shot, a type of artillery round used in warfare as anti-personnel ammunition
- Film canister, used to contain 35 mm film in cameras
- Gas containers used for riot control agents, such as tear gas or pepper spray
- Gas mask canister, a circular chemical cartridge that is part of a gas mask
- Water canister

== See also ==
- Tin can (which refers more specifically to the metal canister)
- Jerrycan, a robust liquid container made from pressed steel
