= Ralph Hobday =

British architect (1899–1975)

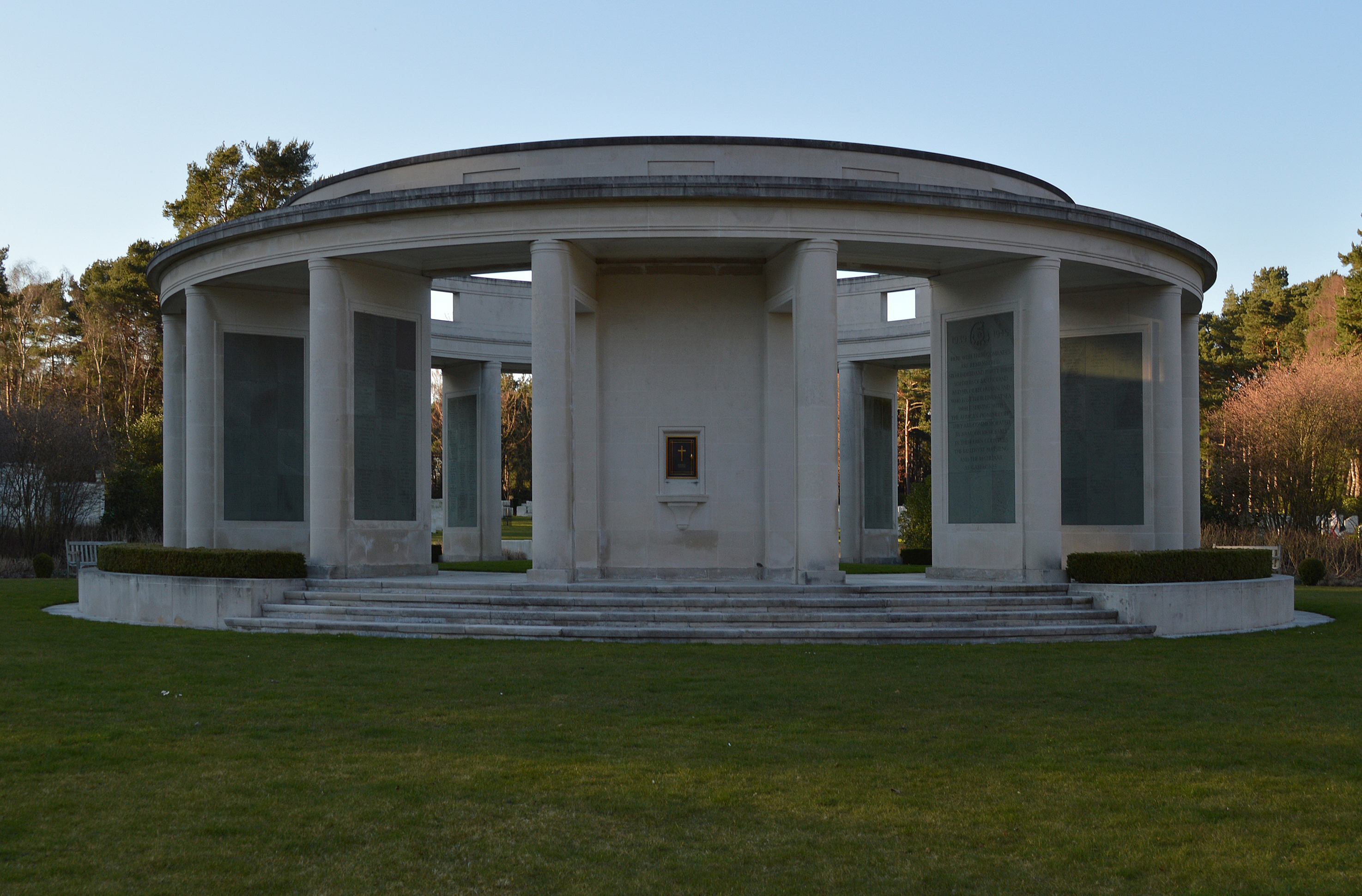
The Brookwood Memorial, built in 1958 and designed by Ralph Hobday

Ralph Hobday OBE (September 1899 – October 1975) was a British architect who worked for the Commonwealth War Graves Commission.

== Career ==
Hobday joined the Commonwealth War Graves Commission in 1944, became Senior Architect in 1956, and retired from the Commission in 1975.

== Works ==
His works include:

=== Cemeteries ===
- Ambon War Cemetery on Ambon Island, Indonesia
- Jakara War Cemetery in Menteng Pulo, Jakarta, Indonesia
- Shelters and entrance gates at Lyness Royal Naval Cemetery, Hoy, Orkney, Scotland

=== Memorials ===
- The Brookwood Memorial in Brookwood Cemetery, Surrey, England. Unveiled by Queen Elizabeth II in 1958, it commemorates 3,428 Commonwealth men and women who died during the Second World War and have no known grave.
- A war memorial in the form of an obelisk, which was placed in 1961 by the Commonwealth War Graves Commission opposite the World War II war graves plot at Willesden Jewish Cemetery in the London Borough of Brent, England. The first national Jewish war memorial in the UK, it is Grade II listed.

== Honours ==
Hobday was appointed Officer in the Order of the British Empire in the 1959 Birthday Honours.
