= Clairvaux =

Clairvaux may refer to:

== Places ==
- Clairvaux-d'Aveyron, a commune in the Aveyron department in southern France
- Clairvaux-les-Lacs, a commune in the Jura department of France
  - Lacs de Clairvaux, two lakes located in Clairvaux-les-Lacs
- Scorbé-Clairvaux, a commune in the Vienne department in the Nouvelle-Aquitaine region of western France
- Clairvaux, a former commune in France, now part of Ville-sous-la-Ferté
  - Clairvaux Abbey, a former Cistercian site
  - Clairvaux Prison, built on the site of the abbey
- Clairvaux MacKillop College in Brisbane, Australia
- Abbey of New Clairvaux, a rural Trappist monastery in northern California
- Mount Clairvaux, a mountain on the Continental Divide and the boundary of British Columbia and Alberta, Canada

== People ==
- Alcher of Clairvaux, atwelfth-century monk of Clairvaux
- Geoffrey of Clairvaux, Bernard's secretary and biographer
- Nicholas of Clairvaux
- Saint Bernard of Clairvaux, the most famous abbot
- Gerard of Clairvaux (died 1138), Bernard's older brother
- Gerard of Clairvaux (died 1177), abbot of Clairvaux, the first Cistercian martyr
