= Tramway of Clairvaux =

Coordinates: 48.145779518505485°N 4.793190871345208°E

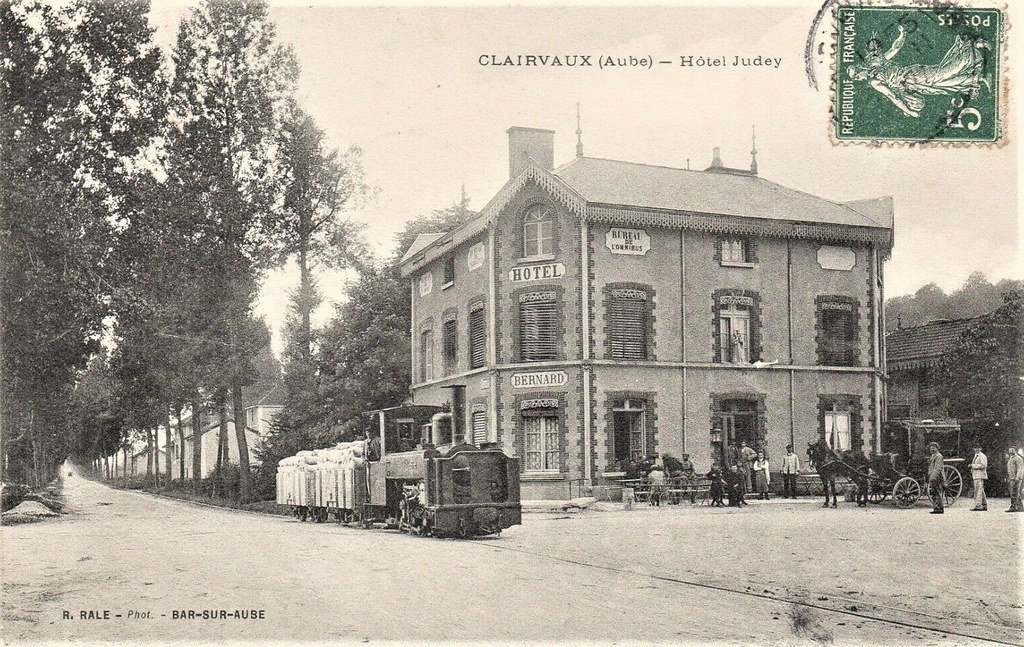
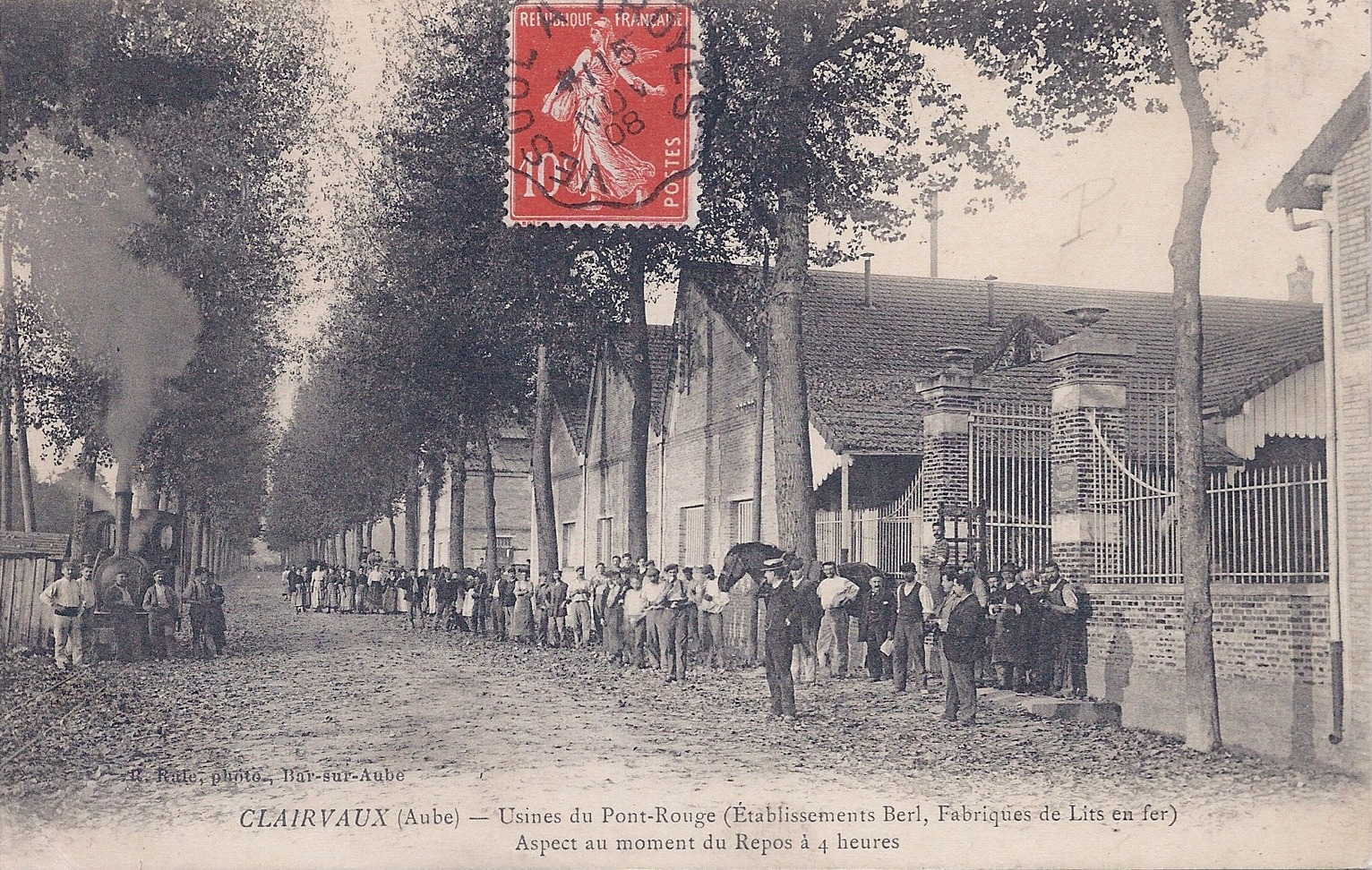
- Corpet-Louvet No 539 of 1891 at the Hotel Saint Bernard O&K No 2849 of 1911 at Usines du Pont Rouge

Overview
- Native name: Tramway des Fours à Chaux

Technical
- Line length: More than 5.8 km (3.6 mi)
- Track gauge: 600 mm (1 ft 11 5/8 in)
Route map
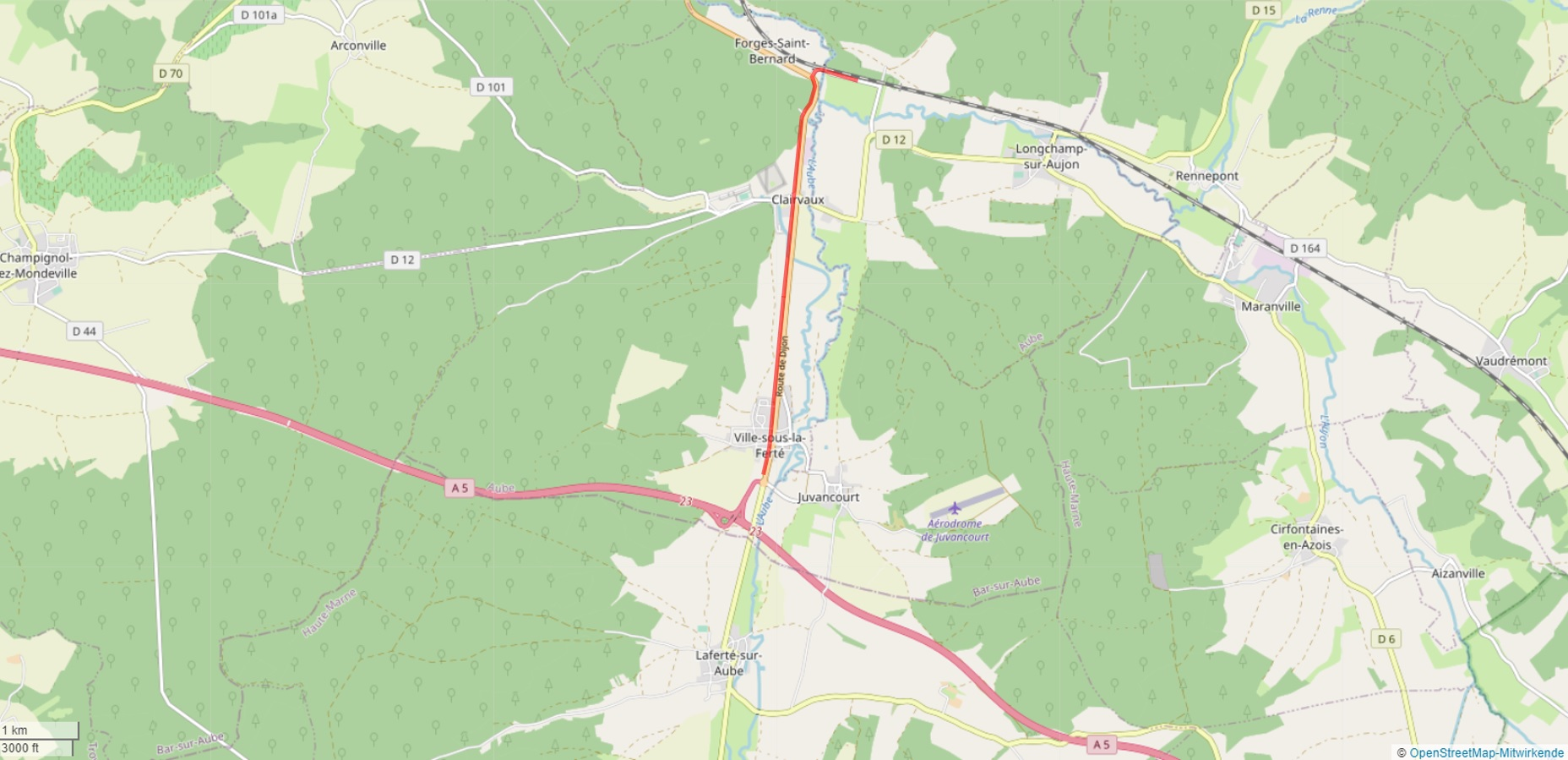

The Tramway of Clairvaux (French Tramway des Fours à Chaux) was a more than 5.8 km (3.6 mi) long narrow-gauge railway with a gauge of 600 mm (1 ft 11 5/8 in) in Ville-sous-la-Ferté near Clairvaux Abbey.

== Route ==
The main line ran on the départemental road D 396 in the Aube Valley to connect the hamlets Les Forges Saint Bernard, Le Four à Chaux and Clairvaux of the municipality Ville-sous-la-Ferté. It started at Clairvaux railway station on the Paris-Est–Mulhouse-Ville railway between Troyes and Culmont-Chalindrey. It passed the Usines du Pont Rouge, a subsidiary of the iron-frame bed manufacturer Etablissements Berl in Luxemburg, which are now owned by Regnier, a manufacturer of wooden seat panels. It also passed the Hotel Saint Bernard, just opposite Clairvaux Abbey, which is now being used as a high-security prison, where it regularly stopped for refreshments and for taking photographs. From there it continued probably to other lime quarries and furnaces.

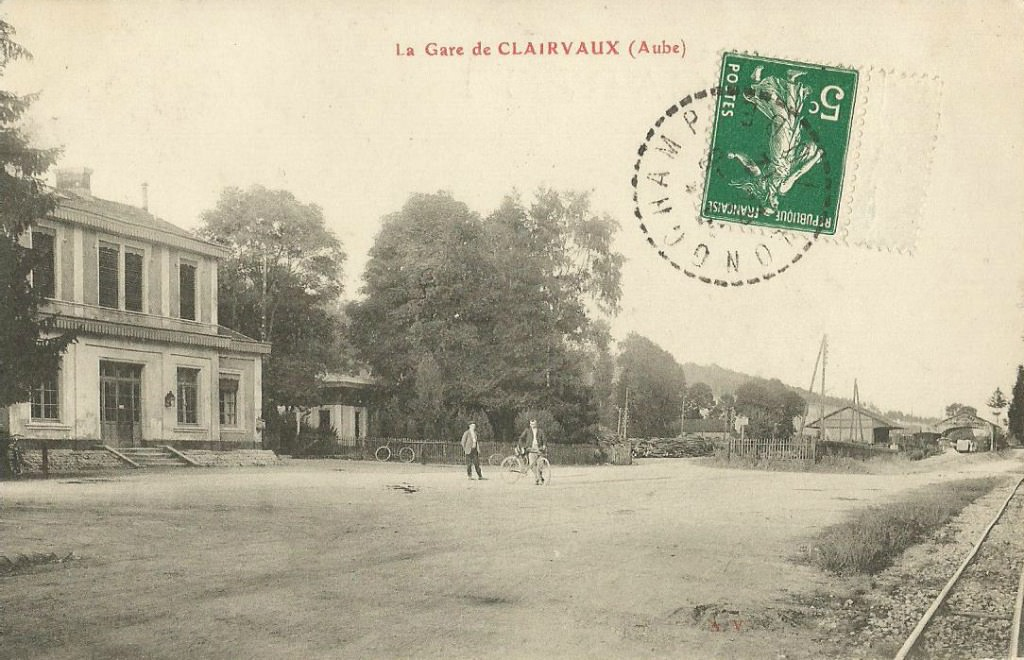
Narrow gauge track at Clairvaux station

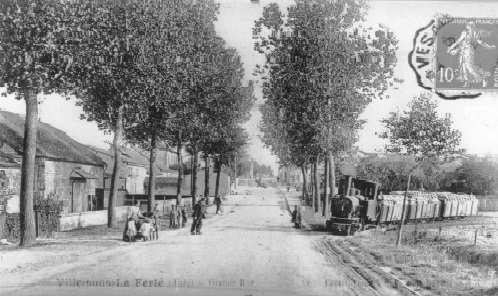
Départemental road from Bar-sur-Aube to Dijon

It was mainly used for goods transport of mineral products such as lime, cement and coal and had sidings at the following companies:

- Société des Chaux Hydrauliques et Ciments de l'Aube
- Usines Poliet & Chausson, a lime producer
- Usine Saint-Bernard, a lime producer
- Usine de Chaux Convert et Maugras (subsequently Société des Chaux Hydrauliques et Ciments de l'Aube)
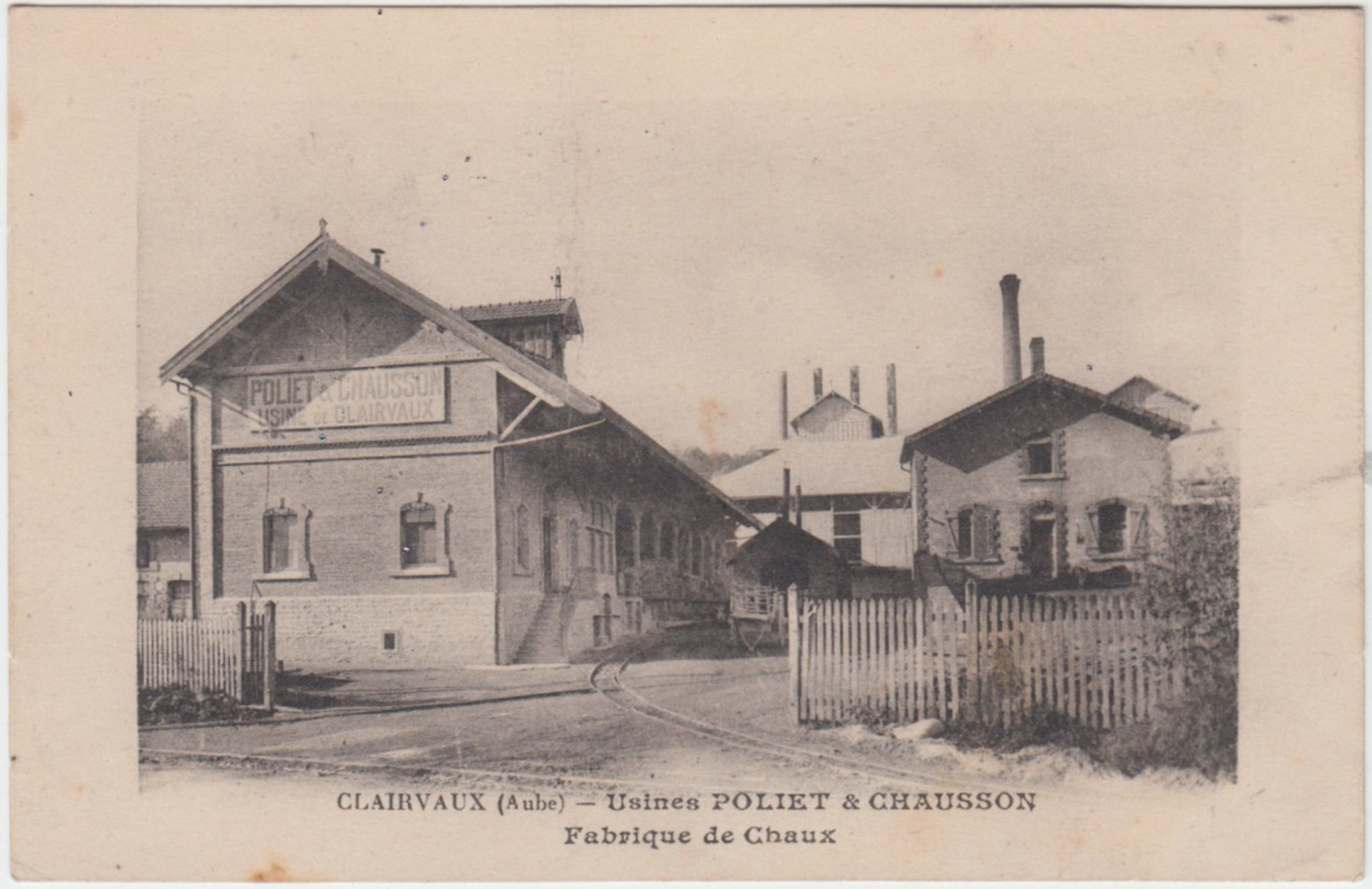
Usines Poliet & Chausson, a lime producer

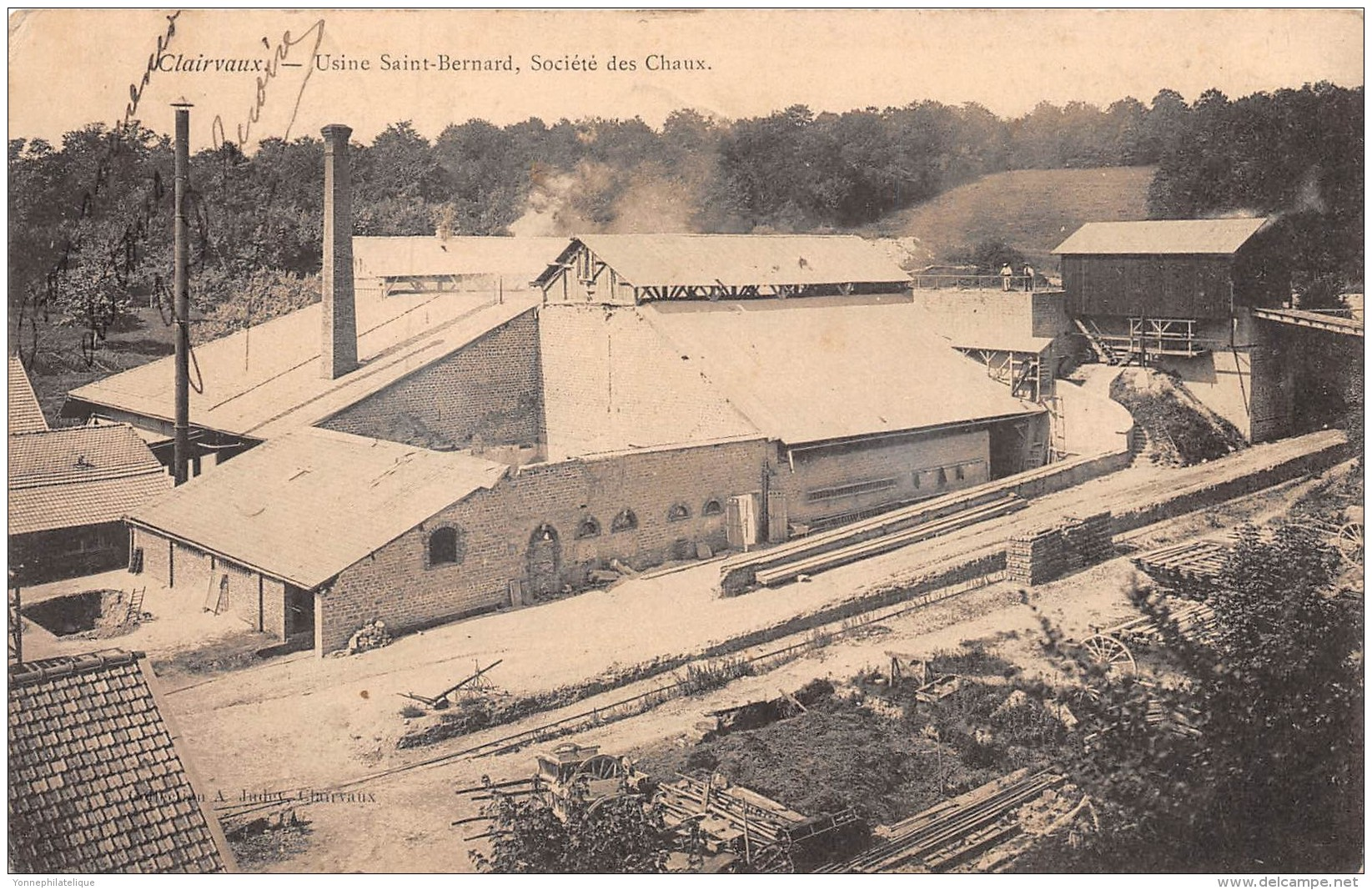
Usine Saint-Bernard, a lime producer

== Locomotives ==
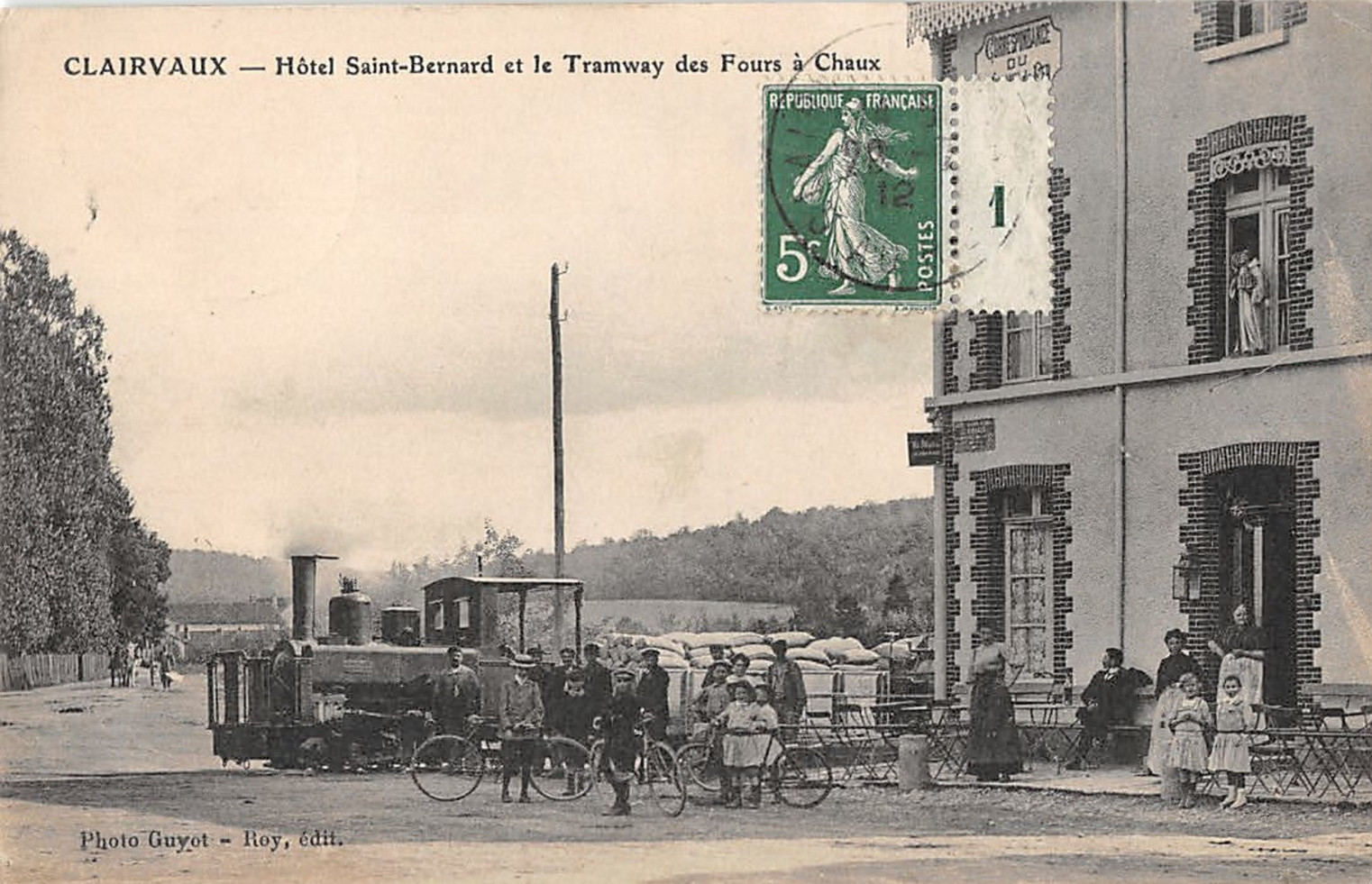
Corpet & Louvet No 539 of 1891

At least two steam locomotives were owned by the Société des Chaux Hydrauliques et Ciments to be used on this line:

- 0-6-0T Corpet-Louvet with a Systeme Brown control, No 539 delivered on 23 March 1891
- 0-6-0T O&K No 2849 delivered around 1911
