= Chiaravalle =

Chiaravalle may refer to:

== Places ==
- Chiaravalle (district of Milan), a district of Milan, Italy
- Chiaravalle Abbey: Cistercian abbey in the eponymous district of Milan
- Chiaravalle Centrale, a town in the province of Catanzaro
- Chiaravalle, Marche, a comune (municipality) in the Province of Ancona in the Italian region Marche
- Clairvaux Abbey (Italian: Chiaravalle), a former Cistercian monastery in Ville-sous-la-Ferté, France

== People ==
- Bernie Chiaravalle (born 1953), American guitarist and singer-songwriter
- Francesco da Chiaravalle (died 1450), Roman Catholic bishop
- Chiaravalle (family), Italian noble family

== See also ==
- Clairvaux (disambiguation)
