= Arcis-le-Ponsart =

- Commune
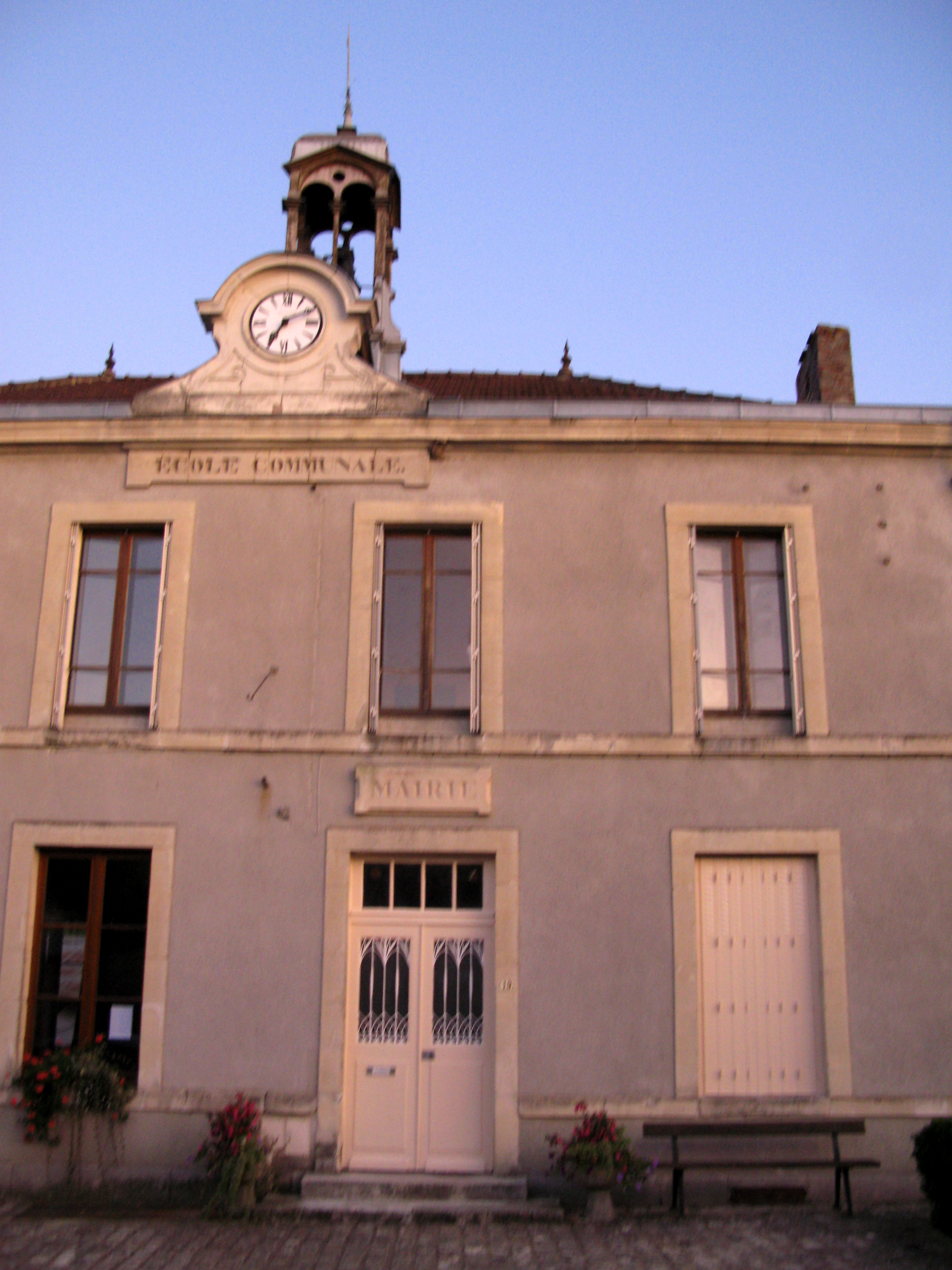
- The town hall in Arcis-le-Ponsart
- Location of Arcis-le-Ponsart
- Location within France Location within Grand Est
- Coordinates: 49°14′09″N 3°41′40″E
- Country: France
- Region: Grand Est
- Department: Marne
- Arrondissement: Reims
- Canton: Fismes-Montagne de Reims
- Intercommunality: CU Grand Reims

Government
  - Mayor (2020–2026): Jean-Luc Dubois
- Area^{1}: 15.43 km^{2} (5.96 sq mi)
- Highest elevation: 248 m (814 ft)
- Lowest elevation: 100 m (330 ft)
- Population (2023): 285
  - Density: 18.5/km^{2} (47.8/sq mi)
- Time zone: UTC+01:00 (CET)
  - Summer (DST): UTC+02:00 (CEST)
- INSEE/Postal code: 51014 /51170
- ^{1} French Land Register data, which excludes lakes, ponds, glaciers > 1 km^{2} (0.386 sq mi or 247 acres) and river estuaries.

Arcis-le-Ponsart (French pronunciation: [aʁsi lə pɔ̃saʁ]) is a commune in the Marne department in northeastern France. It is located along the D25 road, south of Courville, 32.2 kilometres (20.0 mi) by road southwest of Reims. The commune of Arcis-le-Ponsart has an area of 15.4 square kilometres (5.9 sq mi). The local economy is mainly agricultural based. Igny Abbey lies in this commune.

== Toponymy ==
Until the early nineteenth century, the town was called Arcis-le-Poussart or simply Pousard. The name Arcis comes from the Latin word "arx", meaning "fortified place"; and the nickname Ponsart refers to a former local knight from Arcy, Ponsard.

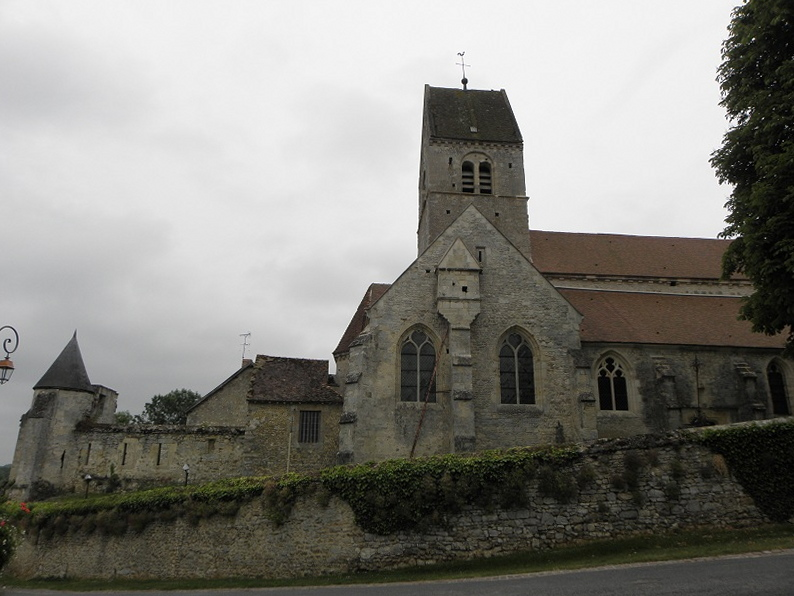
Église Notre-Dame

== History ==
In 1127, Bernard of Clairvaux founded Igny Abbey on land purchased from Ponsard. During the twelfth and thirteenth centuries, the monks of this abbey cleared and cultivated the land and surrounding forests. Arcis-le-Ponsard was damaged repeatedly, including the troops of the Hundred Years War, those of Charles V, the Franco-Spanish War (1635–1659), the French Revolutionary Wars, and the Prussian and Russian armies of 1814. During the First World War, a military camp was installed here.

== Landmarks ==
The Église Notre-Dame, a ruin, is attributed partly to twelfth century and partly Renaissance style. It became a historical monument on 18 November 1919. The Abbaye Notre-Dame d'Igny was founded in the 1120s by monks from the Abbey of Clairvaux, sent by St. Bernard of Clairvaux. Following a pilgrimage to the abbey which brought rapid development, a daughter house, Signy Abbey, was founded in 1135. The second abbot, Guerric of Igny, was raised to the rank of Blessed; his relics are still venerated in Igny. At the time of the French Revolution, the religious community was dispersed. It was rebuilt in 1780. Monastic life resumed in 1876 with the support of the Diocese of Reims. Destroyed in 1918, the abbey was rebuilt in 1929 and occupied by a community of nuns from Laval.

== Population ==
Historical population

Year	Pop.	±% p.a.
1793	495	—
1821	577	+0.55%
1846	528	−0.35%
1872	495	−0.25%
1901	501	+0.04%
1926	303	−1.99%
1946	353	+0.77%
1962	341	−0.22%
1968	301	−2.06%

Year	Pop.	±% p.a.
1975	247	−2.79%
1982	231	−0.95%
1990	243	+0.64%
1999	261	+0.80%
2007	267	+0.28%
2012	287	+1.46%
2017	313	+1.75%
2023	285	−1.55%

Source: EHESS and INSEE (1968–2023)

== See also ==
- Communes of the Marne department
