= Gerard of Clairvaux =

Gerard of Clairvaux may refer to:

- Gerard of Clairvaux (died 1138), brother of Bernard of Clairvaux, recognized as a saint
- Gerard of Clairvaux (died 1177), abbot of Clairvaux (as Gerard I), recognized as a martyr
- Gerard of Clairvaux (died 1286), abbot of Clairvaux (as Gerard II)
