= Claude Buffet =

French criminal (1933–1972)

- Born: Claude Gabriel Buffet; 19 May 1933; Reims, Marne department, France
- Died: 28 November 1972 (aged 39); La Santé Prison, 14th arrondissement of Paris, France
- Cause of death: Execution by guillotine
- Convictions: Murder (15 October 1970); Hostage crisis and murder with aggravating circumstances (29 June 1972)
- Penalty: Life imprisonment (15 October 1970); Death (29 June 1972)
- Accomplice: Roger Bontems

Details
- Victims: Françoise Bésimensky, 26 (1967); Nicole Comte, 35, and Guy Girardot, 27 (1971)
- Date: 18 January 1967; 21-22 September 1971
- Locations: Paris (1967); Clairvaux Prison (1971)
- Weapons: Gun, knife
- Date apprehended: 8 February 1967; 22 September 1971

Claude Gabriel Buffet (19 May 1933 – 28 November 1972) was a French murderer who was executed by guillotine for the murders of prison warder Guy Girardot and prison nurse Nicole Comte during a hostage situation at Clairvaux Prison. The execution was controversial as Buffet's accomplice in the crime, Roger Bontems, did not partake in the killings, yet was still sentenced to death alongside Buffet.

== Early life ==
Buffet was born in Reims to middle-class parents Madeleine Lucile Françoise Dubois, a bottler, and Lucien Alfred Buffet, a wool comber. His father was a violent alcoholic who frequently wasted away the meager family earnings. Buffet was rebellious in his teenage years and socially isolated himself, refusing to attend mandatory military duty in the 3rd Regiment of Troupes coloniales.

In 1953, Buffet enlisted in the French Foreign Legion and stationed in French Indochina, where Buffet abandoned his troop while in the Associated State of Vietnam on 6 October 1954, later stating he had spent the next five months with the Viet Minh in the north. He was recaptured on 4 April 1955 and charged for desertion, ultimately being required to complete his five years of service in French Algeria and briefly Morocco. Buffet was demobilized on 4 August 1958, moving to Paris and marrying his war godmother Huguette, with whom he had a child in 1959. He worked occasional labour jobs for a few years and began having extramarital affairs.

In April 1964, Buffet stole 10,000 francs from his employer in Suresnes. He was arrested by highway police and sentenced to 13 months imprisonment. Following his release in 1965, Buffet abandoned his family, living the life of a petty criminal by engaging in car theft, particularly taxis, and committing fraud, using stolen check books.

== Serial robberies and assaults ==
Buffet's main source of income was through muggings, initially through purse snatching thefts. In March 1966, he began using a gun to intimidate the victims, robbing and physically assaulting 42 women in this manner in the Paris metropolitan area, most in Seine department, by January 1967. Buffet first used a fake weapon, but soon came to wield a real, loaded pistol in the robberies, in which he was sometimes aided by one of his mistresses, Marie Ansoine (also Marie André). The last such robbery occurred on 17 January 1967, when Josiane Dominique resisted an attempted handbag theft in Saint-Cloud, noting that the robber was driving a taxi, later determined to have been stolen by Buffet a day earlier.

=== Murder of Françoise Bésimensky ===
In the late evening of 18 January 1967, Buffet, posing as a taxi driver, picked up 26-year-old model Françoise Bésimensky in the 16th arrondissement. Buffet ignored her instructions for Boulogne-sur-Seine and drove Bésimensky to a secluded street near Bois de Boulogne. Turning around in his seat, Buffet pulled out his gun and demanded the bag his passenger carried, which Bésimensky refused to do. Buffet later gave two contradicting versions of what occurred. He initially said that Bésimensky grabbed him by the lapel, to which Buffet pushed her back while pressing one of his feet to the accelerator, inadvertently firing a shot while pointing the gun at Bésimensky. Buffet later offered a second explanation, considered less plausible by investigators, claiming to have simply told Bésimensky "Since you tried to resist me, I have no choice but to kill you" and fired the fatal gunshot on purpose. To disguise the motive, Buffet staged the crime as a rape by undressing Bésimensky and inserting a compact she carried into Bésimensky's vagina. Police thus first believed that the murderer had committed the crime out of sadism, seeking to resolve the case quickly as Bésimensky was the wife of the chief physician of Beaujon Hospital.

Marie Ansoine later stated that Buffet went to bed with her without saying anything, but told her the following morning of the murder, which she didn't believe since Buffet often told her lies. Though she briefly considered the possibility that Buffet was being truthful, Ansoine again disregarded Buffet's story when he suddenly proclaimed to have previously "killed so many in the war".

On 4 February 1967, Buffet attempted to fatally strangle 5-year-old Sylvia Gautrin at her home in Ris-Orangis, after the girl's mother had refused Buffet's advances. Another girl described the assailant as wearing a distinct astrakhan pelt hat, which she recognised as commonly worn by Buffet, who was a friend of her mother. As the intruder had entered through a window, Gautrin's mother also suspected Buffet, since she once told him how her husband entered the apartment the same way, through the same window, after forgetting his keys. Four days later, Buffet was arrested when police caught him near a stolen car, carrying a gun of the same calibre used in the Bésimensky murder. Buffet confessed first confessed to about sixty assaults by his own count with his accomplice Marie Ansoine before admitting to killing Françoise Bésimensky, but insisted the latter had been an accident. At one point, Buffet implicated Ansoine in being present during the murder, but retracted this statement immediately after; Ansoine was nevertheless arrested as his accomplice in the previous robberies, with a fake gun found on her person on arrest. Similarly, he denied the attack on Sylvia Gautrin, claiming to have been asleep next to his wife at the time, though Buffet's wife admitted that her husband could have snuck out.

=== Trial ===
The trial of Claude Buffet and Marie Ansoine began on 8 October 1970 at Paris Assize Court. The public prosecution spoke in favour of life imprisonment so that Buffet had the chance to atone for his crime. Buffet was outraged at this since he wanted the death penalty for himself. During testimony, Buffet and Ansoine frequently interrupted each other and accused the other person of lying. Psychiatrists labelled Buffet a "dangerous madman". On 15 October, Buffet received a life sentence for murder and theft, while Ansoine was given a three-year suspended sentence for theft and receiving stolen goods. Buffet stormed out of the court room after the verdict, proclaiming that they had "not seen the last of him".

== Imprisonment ==
Buffet spent a brief period at Fleury-Mérogis Prison before being transferred to Clairvaux Prison on 19 June 1971, becoming the cellmate of Roger Bontems, an unemployed plumber and veteran of the Algerian War serving a 20-year sentence for a 1962 armed robbery and assault committed with a fake gun. Bontems was at Clairvaux for a series of non-violent escape attempts and recruited Buffet into participating in his next plan, which was to take prison staff hostage with knives to negotiate their freedom from authorities. Bontems bought an Opinel knife from the prison canteen while Buffet acquired a 20-cm shiv made of from a piece of metal bed frame from a prisoner network.

=== Hostage-taking ===
On 21 September 1971, Buffet and Bontems complained of abdominal pain after eating breakfast. Four prison guards escorted the two prisoners to the infirmary, where Buffet grabbed one of the guards, 27-year-old Guy Girardot, and shoved him into the two nurses present while Bontems locked the door. One of the nurses, a fellow prisoner, was released while Girardot and the remaining nurse, 35-year-old Nicole Comte, were held at knifepoint. The prisoners demanded money, firearms, and two cars equipped with radioes. The hostage crisis was broadcast on national television and radio.

On 22 September 1971, at about 3:45, police stormed the premises on order of Justice Minister René Pleven. Buffet and Bontems were subdued with high-powered water cannons, but not before Buffet fatally slit the throats of both hostages. It was found that Bontems had at no point used his own knife, which remained folded in his pocket until their arrest.

=== Trial ===
The trial of Claude Buffet and Roger Bontems took place at Aube Assize Court began on 26 June 1972. They were represented by attorney Robert Badinter, who asserted that Buffet had led the hostage-taking and planned the killings to force a death sentence. The prosecution sought the death penalty for both men, initially based on the perception that both had killed the hostages. A forensics expert, Raymond Martin, first attested that all wounds had been inflicted by Buffet's distinct blade, but the report was invalidated by a judge. Badinter was able to challenge the judge's decision and clear Bontems of his murder charges. Subsequently the prosecution argued that while Buffet was the one to kill the hostages, Bontems was equally complicit. On 29 June, Buffet and Bontems were both sentenced to death. Buffet appeared content during the verdict and made no appeals thereafter, even writing to the president's office, "If I am pardoned, I will kill again". Bontems filed appeals to the Court of Cassation, but was rejected on 12 October 1972. A day before the men's joint execution, Badinter was informed by the Élysée Palace that President Georges Pompidou had refused to pardon Bontems due to public opinion.

As highlighted in Robert Badinter's book L'Exécution, Bontems' execution inspired Badinter to become involved in politics, becoming Minister of Justice in 1981 and abolishing capital punishment as one of his first actions in this position.
