= Gueux =

Gueux can mean different things:

- Les Gueux ("The Beggars") and les Gueux de mer ("Sea Beggars"), name taken on during the Eighty Years' War by the Dutch rebels against Spain.
- Claude Gueux, short story by Victor Hugo
- Reims-Gueux - a French racing circuit
- Gueux, a commune of the Marne département, in France
- Gueuze, a style of beer
