= Conrad of Eberbach =

Cistercian monk and abbot

Conrad of Eberbach (German: Konrad von Eberbach, Latin: Conradus Eberbacensis) (died 18 September 1221) was a Cistercian monk, and later abbot, of Eberbach Abbey, Germany, and historian of the early Cistercian Order.

== Life ==
Nothing is known of Conrad's early life. From no later than 1169 he was a Cistercian monk at Clairvaux. At some unknown date (estimated to be around 1206) he moved to Eberbach Abbey in the Rheingau, of which from 1 May 1221 he was abbot, and where he died in the same year.

== Exordium ==
Conrad's single great work, the Exordium Magnum Cisterciense or Exordium magnum Ordinis Cisterciensis, in six books, concerns the early history of the Cistercians. Books 1-4 were written while he was still at Clairvaux, in the time of Abbot Garnier de Rochefort (1186-93); the last two were added at Eberbach, between 1206 and 1221. It is a book of instruction, on the theme of the early days and flowering of the Cistercians at Clairvaux, containing much information on significant persons (among them Saint Bernard of Clairvaux and other great Cistercian figures) and events in the life of the abbey and order.

The book is one of the most effective monastic examples of this particular mediaeval literary genre combining historical narrative with exempla, miracles and visions, also represented by Caesarius of Heisterbach and Engelhard of Langheim.

The Exordium was widely disseminated as a work of Christian spirituality by the Cistercians and also in the 15th century by the Dutch devotio moderna.

== Quotation ==
To get acquainted with the Cistercian environment and its spirit, it is essential to become familiar with the Exordium magnum Ordinis Cisterciensis, a document of the highest value. (Étienne Gilson)

== Sources ==
- Kolumban Spahr (1980). "Konrad". Neue Deutsche Biographie (in German). Vol. 12. Berlin: Duncker & Humblot. p. 536. (full text online).
- Wilhelm Wattenbach (1882). "Konrad, Abt von Eberbach". Allgemeine Deutsche Biographie (in German). Vol. 16. Leipzig: Duncker & Humblot. p. 639.
- Renkhoff, Otto (1992), Nassauische Biographie (in German), Wiesbaden: Historische Kommission für Nassau, p. 418, ISBN 3-922244-90-4
- Worstbrock, Franz Josef, 1985: Konrad von Eberbach in Verfasserlexikon, Bd. 5. 2nd edition, col. 156–159
- Braca, Lorenzo (2017), I Libri miraculorum cistercensi: visioni dell'aldilà e crisi istituzionale tra XII e XIII secolo (in Italian), Saonara (Padova): Il Prato, p. 384, ISBN 9788863363630

== Translations ==
- Benedicta Ward (translator and editor), Paul Savage (translator), E. Rozanne Elder (editor), 2012: The Great Beginning of Citeaux: The Exordium Magnum of Conrad of Eberbach: A Narrative of the Beginning of the Cistercian Order (Cistercian Fathers series No 72). Translation of the critical edition by Bruno Griesser, Series Scriptorum Sacri Ordinis Cisterciensis, vol 2: Rome 1961. Cistercian Publications; Abbey of Gethsemani, Kentucky ISBN 978-0-87907-172-1 and ISBN 978-0-87907-2 (digitised version on Google books)
- Heinz Piesik: Exordium Magnum Cisterciense oder Bericht vom Anfang des Zisterzienserordens von Conradus Eberbacensis, 2 volumes (Books 1-3 and 4-6), Quellen und Studien zur Zisterzienserliteratur. Publications of the Zisterzienserakademie volumes 3 and 5, Bernardus, Langwaden 2000 and 2002. ISBN 3-934551-17-3 and ISBN 3-934551-57-2
