= Peter Monoculus =

Peter Monoculus (died 29 October 1185) was a Cistercian monk who served as the abbot of Igny (1169–1179) and Clairvaux (1179–1185).

Peter was born in Italy to a noble family. He was sent to France to be educated and there chose to enter the Cistercian order. He became a novice at Igny, where he rose to be prior. He was eventually elected abbot of Valroy. While he was abbot of Valroy he was struck by a serious disease that caused him the loss of one eye, hence his nickname, monoculus, 'the one-eyed'. He also suffered a fistula that a surgeon deemed inoperable, but he survived.

In 1169, he was elected abbot of Igny and returned his original monastery. In 1177, during a visitation of Igny, Abbot Gerard of Clairvaux was murdered by a monk named Hugh of Bazoches, because Gerard had sent him to Igny for poor behaviour. Rather than punish him, Peter had him put in the infirmary. That same year, he had been one of ten men recommended for a cardinalate to Pope Alexander III.

In 1179, Peter was elected abbot of Clairvaux. In 1180, he was conducting his visitation of Trois-Fontaines Abbey when Abbot Alard was murdered in the church by one of the monks. In 1185, he was invited to visit Pope Lucius III at Verona, where he took the pope's confession and gave him communion. He died at Clairvaux on 29 October 1185. His biography was written by his friend, the Benedictine Thomas of Reuil. He includes many anecdotes indicating Peter's sanctity. He is today regarded as beatified and his reputed miracles are listed in the Acta Sanctorum. His feast day is 18 May. Some of his stories were incorporated into the Old Icelandic Maríu saga under the heading "Af Pétro Clarevallensis".

== Bibliography ==
- Merton, Thomas (2002). "Blessed Peter 'Monoculus,' Abbott of Igny, then of Clairvaux, France". Cistercian Studies Quarterly. 37 (4): 445–451.
- Wolf, Kirsten (2013). The Legends of the Saints in Old Norse-Icelandic Prose. University of Toronto Press.
