= Augustin Marre =

Augustin Marre (16 November 1853 - 7 September 1927) was a French Roman Catholic Archbishop, and Trappist abbot.

== Life and work ==
Auguste Marre was born in Goutrens, Département Aveyron and entered the Trappist Abbey "The Desert", receiving St. Augustine of Hippo as his new name in religion. 1876, still a novice, he joined the group of monks who refounded Igny Abbey. He was ordained to the priesthood in 1877, two years before taking solemn vows in 1879). He was made Prior in 1881 and Abbot of Igny in 1886.

Marre also had a seat in the city council of Arcis-le-Ponsart, Département Marne, beginning in 1881. In 1900, he was elevated to the episcopacy, being made Auxiliary Bishop of the Archdiocese of Reims under Archbishop Cardinal Benoît-Marie Langénieux.

From 1904 to 1922, Marre served as the second Abbot General of the Trappist Order and also Abbot of Cîteaux, residing in Rome. Upon leaving office, he was the Titular Archbischop of Melitene. He died in Dijon and is buried in Cîteaux.

== Liturgical books ==
- Processionale cisterciense, auctoritate Augustini Marre editum, Westmalle, Typographia Ordinis Cisterciensium Strictioris Observantiae, 1908.
- Hymnarium Cisterciense, auctoritate Augustini Marre editum, Rome, 1909.
- Kalendarium cisterciense seu martyrologium sacri ordinis cisterciensis, auctoritate Augustini Marre editum, Westmalle, Typographia Ordinis Cisterciensium Strictioris Observantiae, 1921.

== Secondary literature ==
- Henri Charrier, Un Prélat Cistercien. Sa Grandeur Monseigneur Augustin Marre OCSO, Archevêque de Mélitène, Abbé d'Igny, Abbé Général émérite. Westmalle [ca. 1930].
- Bernard Delpal, Le silence des moines. Les trappistes au XIXe siècle : France, Algérie, Syrie. Paris, Editions Beauchesne, 1998, pp. 321–322.
