= Signy Abbey =

Abbey in Ardennes, France

Coordinates: 49°42′04″N 4°25′19″E

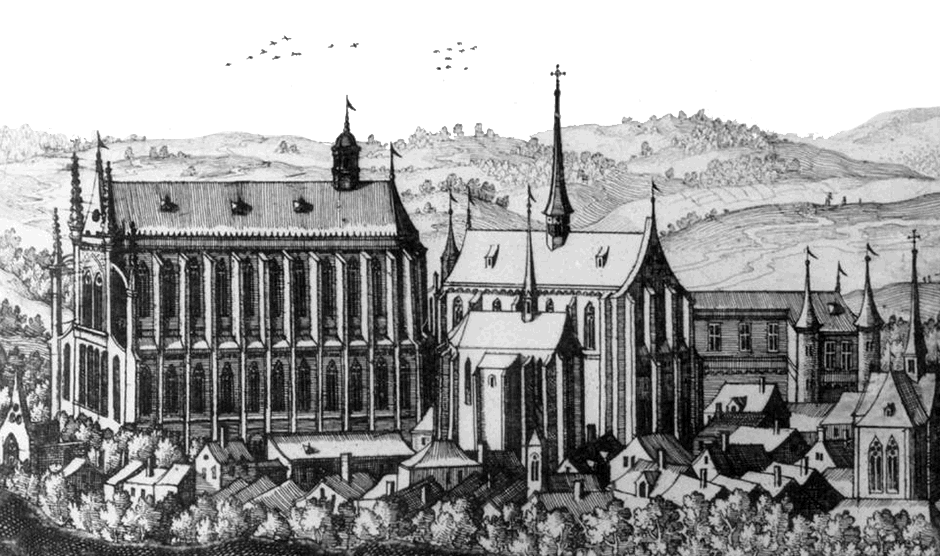
Signy Abbey (engraving of a drawing by Claude Chastillon, 1613 x 1616)

Signy Abbey (French: Abbaye de Signy, Abbaye Notre-Dame de Signy; Latin: Signiacum) was a Cistercian abbey located in Signy-l'Abbaye, Ardennes, France. It is located about 65 kilometres (40 mi) northeast of Reims and about 28 kilometres (17 mi) west of Charleville-Mézières on the edge of the Froidmont forest. It was founded on 25 March 1135, the feast day of the Annunciation. It was sold as national property in 1793 and completely demolished. Its library was burned.

== History ==
The form of the Latin name Signiacum suggests that the site may have been that of a Gallo-Roman villa. The abbey was founded in 1131 and was settled in 1135 by twelve monks under the leadership of Bernard of Clairvaux himself from Igny Abbey, its mother house; it was thus of the filiation of Clairvaux (Saint Bernard's biographer, William of Saint-Thierry (d. 1148), entered it as a simple monk.) The founding company arrived on 20 March 1135; the foundation took place on 25 March 1135, the feast of the Annunciation. As there was no nearby religious community the monks lived in the village of Draize during the first stage of construction.

The monastery quickly acquired estates, and established granges, for crops, vineyards and livestock, in numerous places, including Maimby, Draize, Bray, Rousselois, Chaudion, Chappes, Mésancelle, Lavergny and Écaillère. It was also active in metallurgy and the extraction of slate. It owned town-houses in, among other places, Mézières, Reims and Huy near Liège, not far from its second daughter house, Val-Saint-Lambert Abbey, founded in 1187; the first, Bonnefontaine Abbey, was founded in 1152. The construction of the abbey church took from 1226 to 1514.

In 1550 the abbey passed into the control of commendatory abbots. It was besieged and plundered by the Calvinists in 1568 and several times during the Thirty Years' War, but was eventually rebuilt.

It was dissolved during the French Revolution in 1790/91 and sold off in 1793, after which the premises were mostly demolished for building materials.

== Remains ==
The cross of the lay brothers survives, a monolith 7 metres high, as do the 18th-century buildings of the abbey farm and the guest wing. Various agricultural buildings also survive in the vicinity. Of the almost 4,000 volumes once in the library, most were burned on the spot in the Revolution, but about 300 survive in Charleville and the Bibliothèque Nationale.
