= Geoffrey of Clairvaux =

French theologian

Geoffrey of Clairvaux, or Geoffrey of Auxerre, was the secretary and biographer of Bernard of Clairvaux and later abbot of a number of monasteries in the Cistercian tradition.

== Life ==
He was born between the years 1115 and 1120, at Auxerre. At an early age he entered the ranks of the clergy, and followed for some time the course of lectures given by Abelard.

In 1140 Bernard of Clairvaux came to Paris, and before the assembled scholars preached a sermon "De conversione ad clericos", in which he dwelt on the vanities of a life in the world, on the necessity of a sincere conversion, and on the peace to be found in the monastic profession. Geoffrey, with several others, followed St. Bernard and joined the monastic community of Clairvaux.

Soon he became his notarius, or secretary, and his permanent companion. In 1145 he accompanied him to Toulouse and other cities of Southern France, where the saint preached against the Albigensian heresy of a certain Henry and his partisans. During the years 1146-47 he travelled with Bernard through France and Germany, where the saint aroused people for a crusade to the Holy Land.

At the council of Reims in 1148 he took an active part in the discussion concerning the errors of Gilbert de la Porrée. In 1159 he was made abbot of the Abbaye Notre-Dame du Val d'Igny in the Diocese of Reims, and in 1162 he became the fourth Abbot of Clairvaux. Owing to difficulties with the monks, he was forced to resign in 1165; but in 1170 he was appointed to the Abbey of Fossa Nuova in the diocese of Terracina, Italy, and in 1176 to that of Haute Combe, Savoy.

In the political events of the time he had only a small share; thus, in 1167 and 1168, he took part in the negotiations tending towards the reconciliation of Pope Alexander III (1159–81) with the Emperor Frederic Barbarossa and King Henry II of England.

Geoffrey died some time after the year 1188, probably at the Hautecombe Abbey, Savoy.

== Works ==
Most of the literary activity of Geoffrey has reference to the life and work of St. Bernard. Thus, while still notarius of the saint, he collected the letters of his abbot, variously estimated at 243 or 310. He was the chief author of a life of St. Bernard in five books, furnishing materials for the first two books, revising them, and adding three of his own.

He also wrote fragments of a life of St. Bernard, probably used in the first books of the complete life; an account of the saint's journey to Toulouse, in a letter to his teacher Archenfredus; an account of the saint's journey through Germany, the third part of the sixth book of St. Bernard's life; a panegyric delivered in 1163 on the anniversary of Bernard's death; Declamationes de colloquio Simonis cum Jesu, an ascetical work compiled from the sermons of St. Bernard; Libellus contra capitula Gilberti Pictaviensis Episcopi, a refutation of the errors of Gilbert de la Porrée; a letter to Albinus, Cardinal Bishop of Albano, on the same subject; a life of St. Peter of Tarentaise (1175); a letter to the above-named Cardinal of Albano, as to whether the water added to the wine in the chalice is changed into blood of Our Lord; sermons and commentaries on books of Scripture, partly in print and partly manuscript.
