= War godmother =

Volunteer providing support to a soldier

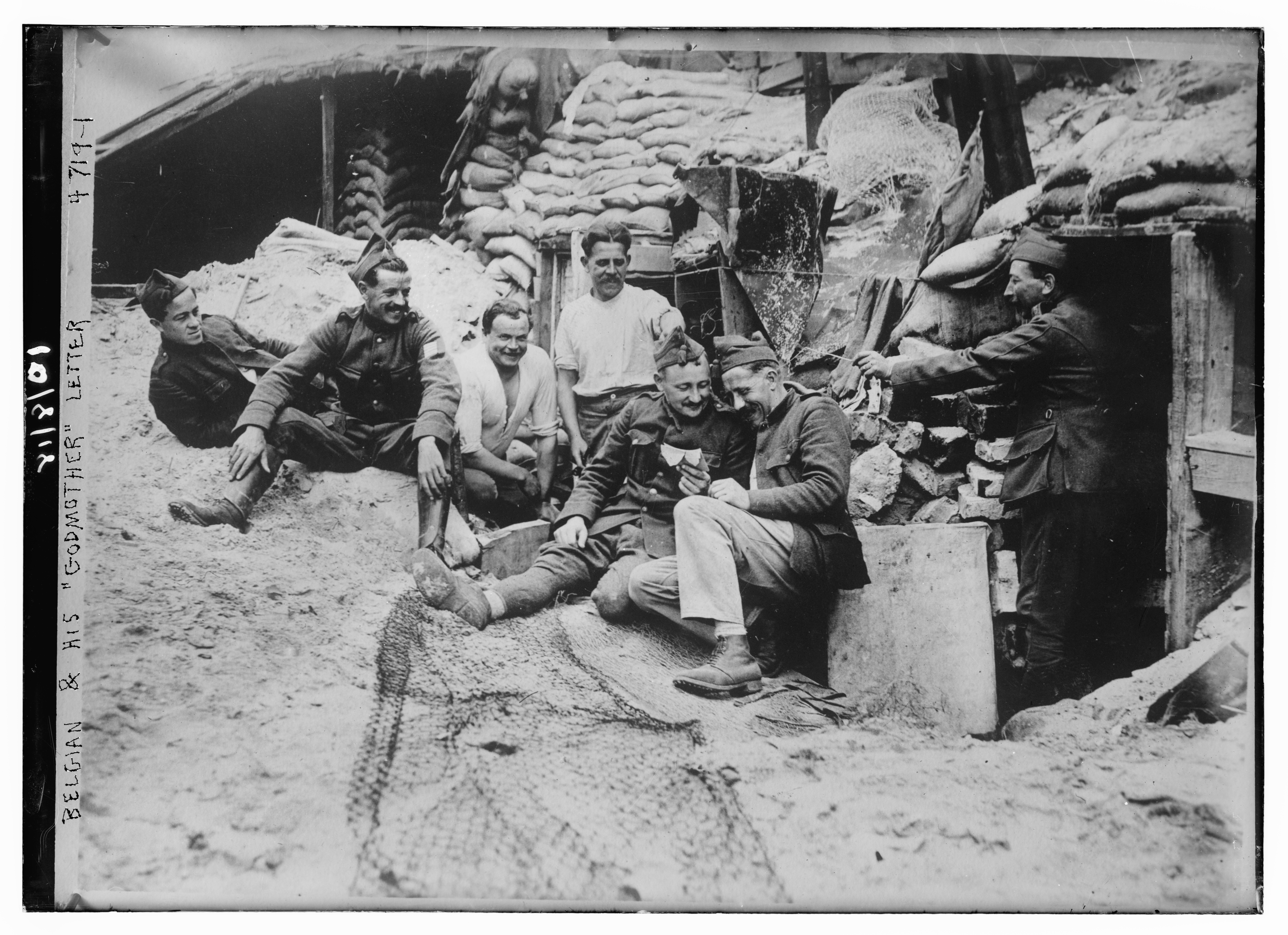
Belgian soldiers on the Yser Front read a letter from a marraine de guerre in a posed propaganda photograph, 1915.

A war godmother (French: marraine de guerre; Dutch: oorlogsmeter) is someone who volunteers to provide succour to or in other ways support a serving soldier - a 'godson' (filleul) - who might have no close family ties.

== Usage of the term ==
The term was first used during World War I when women and girls would write and receive letters and send gifts. The term is still used - as well as the terms war godfather or war godparent - for volunteers who sponsor or tend to the grave of a fallen soldier.

== First World War ==
=== Creation of the role ===
In October 1914, the Bureau de Correspondance Belge [Belgian Correspondence Office] was founded by the Belgian government at Sainte-Adresse, France; it later operated from London. This office arranged secret correspondence between soldiers in occupied Belgium and their families and friends at home. On 11 January 1915, the concept of war godmothers arrived with the creation of La famille du Soldat - a conservative Roman Catholic association - in Angers, France, presided over by Jules Cambon and fr:Eugène Beyens (1855-1934). The organisation had free publicity from L'Écho de Paris newspaper. Its headquarters were transferred to Versaille in July 1915 by the director, Mme. Marguerite de Lens. Similar conservative associations were created, such as Mon soldat, founded by Mme. Bérard and supported by the French Minister for War, Alexandre Millerand and La Revue des marraines, hand-written by Mlle. Picard in Paris. These were promoted by the mainstream press but a significant amount of correspondence was then taken by less conservative magazines which were labelled revues grivoises ["dirty magazines"]. In Belgium, Queen Elisabeth helped to start a war godmother operation and Lieutenant Joseph de Dorlodot began Oeuvre des Marraines de Guerre [Charity of War Godmothers], which had links to equivalent organisations in Cardiff and London. Mary Morris ran the Belgian Soldiers' League of Friendship in London. The Verbond der Oorlogsmeters voor Belgische Soldaten [League of War Godmothers for Belgian Soldiers] operated in Nottingham.

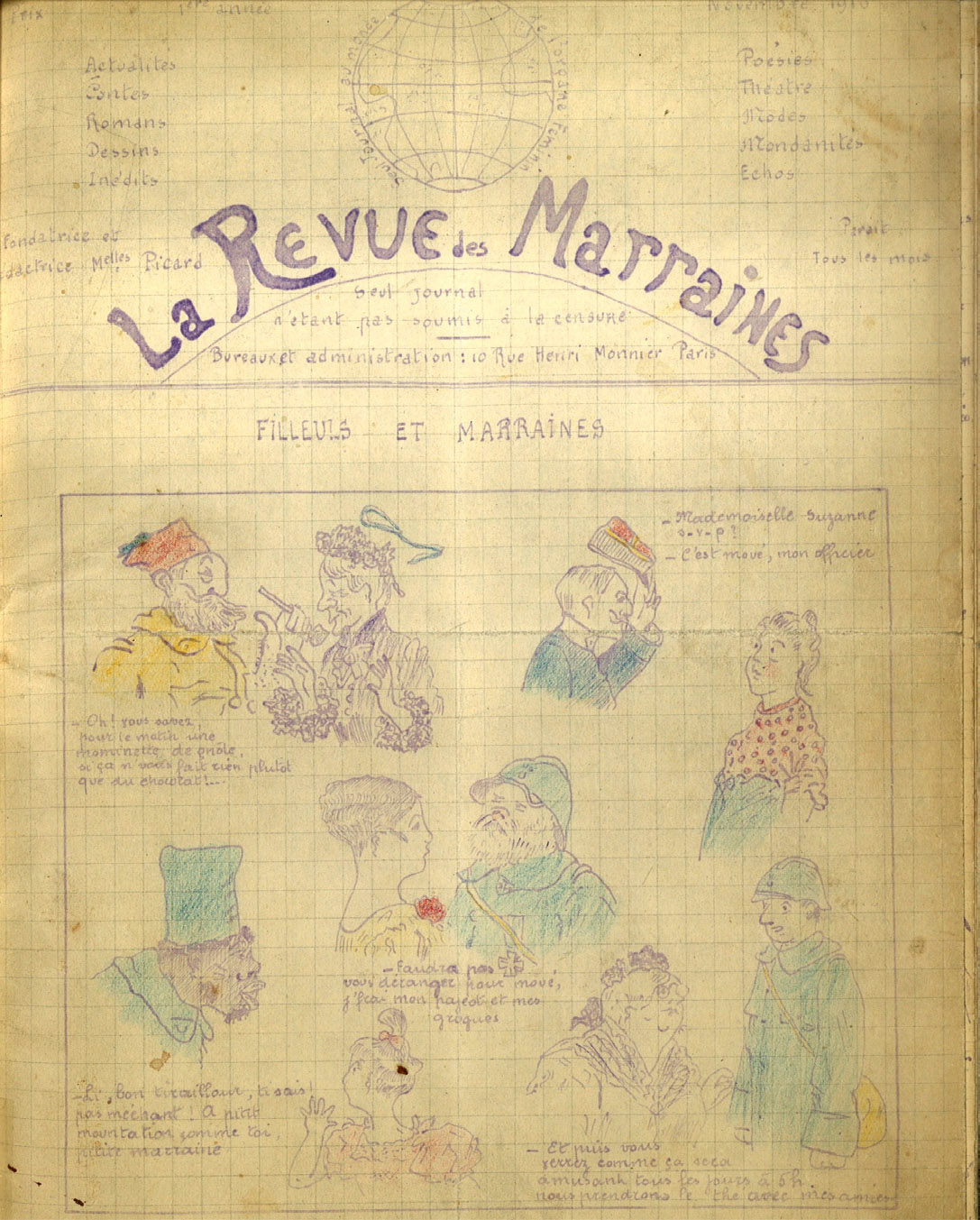
This hand-written journal, La revue des marraines (The war-godmothers' review) was printed by Mlle. Picard in Paris for the soldier filleuls ('godsons') in the trenches during World War I.

=== 1916- Contemporary criticisms and decline ===
In May 1915, the satirical Fantasio magazine launched a scheme called "front flirtation" offering to initiate links between soldiers at the front and women. Overwhelmed by correspondence, the paper terminated the scheme after six months. On 4 December 1915, La Vie parisienne, published by the Iris agency, printed classified advertisements for soldiers seeking companions, all through an intermediary. It was so successful that two pages of advertisements for children seeking adoption were published six months later. Up to 300,000 advertisements were printed during World War I. Others published advertisements in publications such as fr:La Baïonnette, fr:L'Homme Libre, fr:La Croix and fr:Le Journal or looked for companionship through the families and friends of war godmothers. The French authorities were also worried about the usage of war godmothers for intelligence purposes - the war minister Millerand himself appealed to the French Minister of the Interior for the correspondence to be monitored and censored; the British authorities were against the practice of such correspondence. For these reasons, the number of war godmothers dropped significantly from 1916 although they existed for the duration of the war. In 1918 the soldiers' journal Le Poilu advertised a pochette de la marraine [godmother's kit] for serving soldiers to write on. Some godmothers had several godsons from different countries and some soldiers several godmothers.

== Nature of the relationships ==
The relationships were typically limited to letter-writing (some were just primary-school children) and providing moral comfort. Writers came from a number of different countries. Belgian soldiers - who were not allowed leave, unlike their French and British counterparts - were particularly reliant on the communications. Some correspondents hoped to find a partner: Claudius Billon, later a French air force captain and controller of the resistance in the French southern zone, married his war godmother. The letters of Guillaume Apollinaire to his war godmother, Jeanne Burgues-Brun, between 1915 and 1918 were published by éditions Pour les fils de roi in 1948 and then by Éditions Gallimard in 1951.
