= Mount Clairvaux =

Mountain in Alberta and British Columbia, Canada

- Location within Alberta Location within British Columbia Location within Canada

Highest point
- Elevation: 2,690 m (8,830 ft)
- Prominence: 165 m (541 ft)
- Parent peak: Bucephalus Peak (2764 m)
- Listing: Mountains of Alberta; Mountains of British Columbia
- Coordinates: 52°48′18″N 118°24′51″W

Geography
- Country: Canada
- Provinces: Alberta and British Columbia
- Protected areas: Jasper National Park; Mount Robson Provincial Park
- Parent range: Park Ranges
- Topo map: NTS 83D16 Jasper

Mount Clairvaux is located on the border of Alberta and British Columbia, SE of the Yellowhead Pass. Clairvaux is the French word for "clear valleys.".

== See also ==
- List of peaks on the British Columbia–Alberta border
