= Igny Abbey =

Abbey in Marne, France

Coordinates: 49°12′36″N 3°41′07″E

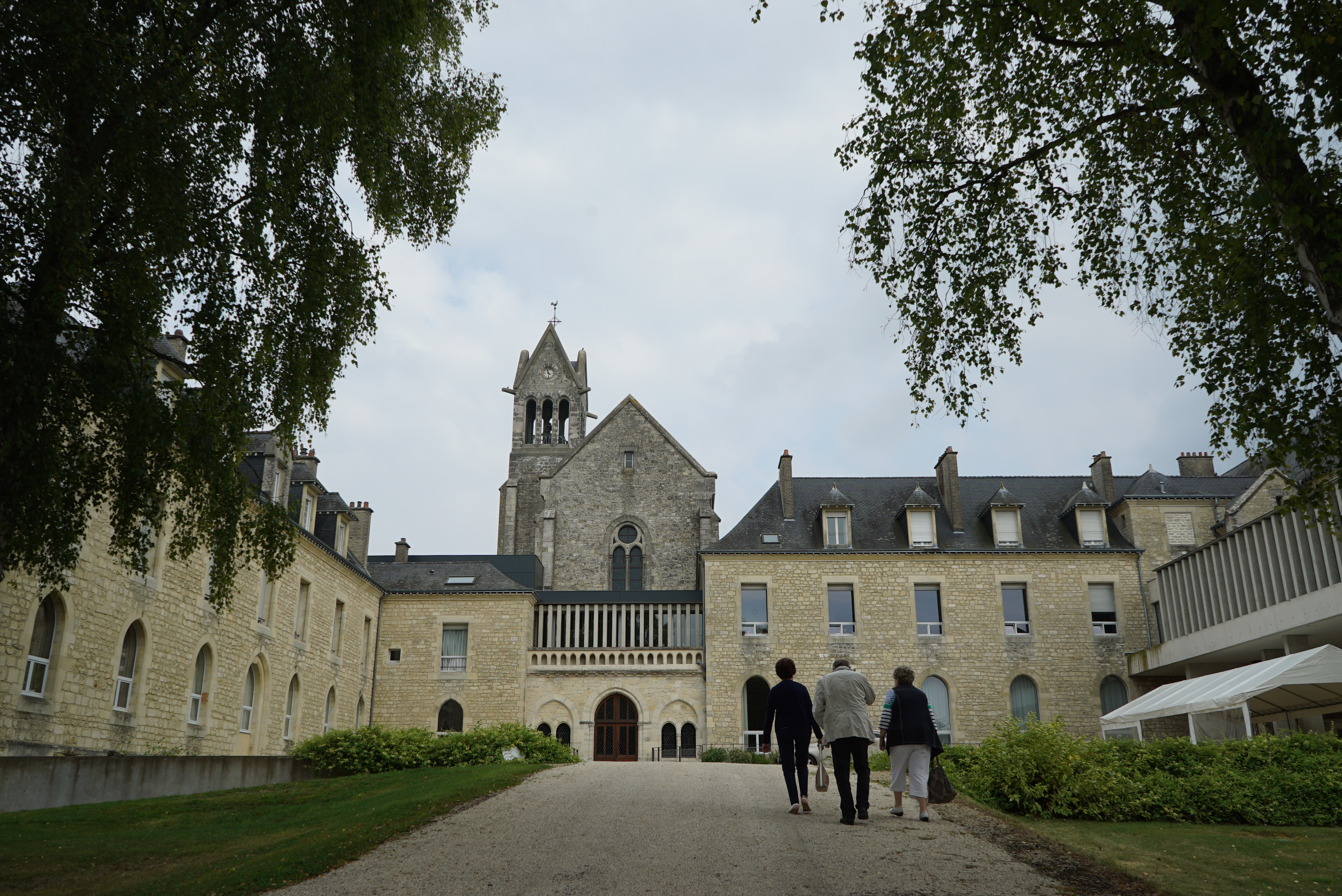
- Main entrance, 2016
- Interactive map of Igny Abbey

Monastery information
- Full name: The Abbey of Our Lady of Igny (French: Abbaye Notre-Dame d'Igny;
- Other name: Abbaye Notre-Dame du Val d'Igny
- Order: Cistercian, Trappist
- Established: 1126-1128, 1876, 1929
- Disestablished: 1790-1874 and 1914-1929
- Mother house: Cîteaux Abbey, France
- Dedication: Virgin Mary
- Diocese: Reims

People
- Founders: Rainaud II de Martigny, Archbishop of Reims
- Important associated figures: Saint Bernard of Clairvaux, Blessed Abbot Guerric of Igny, Blessed Abbot Gerard of Clairvaux, Gaucher V de Châtillon

Site
- Location: Arcis-le-Ponsart, Marne, France.

Igny Abbey or Val d'Igny Abbey (French: Abbaye Notre-Dame d'Igny; Abbaye Notre-Dame du Val d'Igny) is a Cistercian abbey located in Arcis-le-Ponsart, Marne, France. It was founded in 1128 for Cistercian monks, dissolved in 1791 during the French Revolution, re-established in 1876 for Trappist monks, destroyed in 1918, reopened in 1929 for Trappist nuns and modernised in 2008–12 to accommodate three or four pre-existing communities.

== History ==
=== Origins and Zenith ===
Igny Abbey was founded by the Archbishop of Reims, Rainaud II de Martigny, who provided land at Igny. In 1128, Bernard of Clairvaux sent twelve monks from Clairvaux to Igny to establish it under Humbert, previously prior of Clairvaux, as the first abbot (Igny is thus of the filiation of Clairvaux).

The community at Igny prospered sufficiently under Humbert to be able to found a daughter house, Signy Abbey, in 1135. He was succeeded in 1138 by Guerric of Igny, best known for his sermons, later beatified. His relics are still venerated in Igny, and are preserved in the church's side chapel.

A second daughter house, Valroy Abbey, was founded in 1147.

In 1177, Abbot Gerard of Clairvaux, later Blessed Gerard, was murdered at Igny by a certain Hugh of Bazoches, a monk whom he had threatened with disciplinary action, thus becoming the first Cistercian martyr.

Despite this incident, the abbey flourished and in its heyday housed over 500 monks and owned more than 5,000 hectares of land.

As with other Cistercian monasteries, growth at Igny slowed from the later 13th century. In the 14th century the abbey suffered badly from the effects of the Hundred Years' War; large gifts from Gaucher V de Châtillon enabled it to rebuild in 1378. Decline continued, however.

=== Later Fortunes ===
In 1545 the abbey was placed under commendatory abbots, at which time the community consisted of 72 monks. Further damage occurred during the French Wars of Religion in the later 16th century, during which the monastery was pillaged by Huguenots. After still more pillaging suffered during the Thirty Years' War and the Franco-Spanish War, the number of monks had fallen to seven.

In 1733 the church was destroyed and a new one built, which was completed along with other new buildings in 1789, the beginning of the French Revolution. In 1790 all religious houses in France were suppressed; in April 1791 the six monks then living there were turned out and the abbey's assets were declared national property and sold off.

The monastic premises passed into private hands but in 1876 were reacquired by the Archdiocese of Reims for the establishment of a Trappist monastery by a community of monks from the Abbey of Sainte-Marie-du-Désert. The new monastery was at first a priory but was raised to an abbey in 1886. The new community funded themselves mostly by the manufacture of chocolate.

In 1914 the German army appropriated the premises, wrecking the chocolate factory, and turned them into a hospital for infectious diseases. Just before the Second Battle of the Marne in May 1918 the buildings were evacuated; when retreating on 6 August 1918, the Germans blew them up, destroying the entire abbey with the exception of the small library.

The abbey was rebuilt in 1927–1929 and occupied in November 1929 by a community of 32 Trappist nuns from Laval Abbey. In 1955 Igny founded the first house of Cistercian nuns in Africa, the Abbaye Notre-Dame de la Clarté Dieu at Murhesa in South Kivu, in the Democratic Republic of the Congo.

=== Present Nunnery ===
In 2007 the structure of Cistercian communities throughout northern France was re-thought, and the order decided that three communities of nuns should be brought together at Igny: Igny's existing community and those of la Grâce-Dieu and Belval (subsequently the small community of Ubexy was also included). A major re-building consequently took place. In 2011 the four existing communities were installed, which almost doubled the size of the previous population of Igny, as the new community of the Abbaye Notre-Dame du Val d'Igny.

== Abbots and abbesses ==
Cistercian abbots

- 1128-1138: Humbert
- 1138-1157: Guerric I (Bl Guerric of Igny)
- 1157-1162: Geoffrey of Auxerre
- 1162-1164: Bernard
- 1164-1169: Hugh
- 1169-1179: Pierre I Monoculus (Pierre le Borgne)
- 1179-1186: Gerard I
- 1186-1189: Julien (1)
- 1189-1190: Videbatius
- 1190-1205: Julien (2)
- 1205-1232: Nicolas I
- 1232-1234: Jean I
- 1234-1237: Gilbert
- 1238-1239: Anscher
- 1239-1245: Pierre II of Bar
- 1245-1254: Thibaud I
- 1254-1270: Pierre III
- 1270-1284: Gerard II
- 1284-1290: Jean II de Pontoise
- 1291-1292: Nicolas II
- 1292-1300: Alard I
- 1301-1307: Guerric II
- 1307-1327: John III
- 1327-1332: Pons I Wassigny
- 1333-1345: Alard II
- 1345-1355: Jean IV Cohan
- 1356-13??: Jean V Oiselet
- 13?? -13??: Pons II
- 13?? -13??: Ogier I Bezannes
- 13?? -1378: Laurent
- 1378-1399: William
- 1399-1419: Jacques
- 1419-1445: Nicolas III Unchair
- 1445-1460: Thibaud II of Luxembourg
- 1460-1476: Jean VI de Montigny
- 1476-1488: Nicolas IV Suippes
- 1488-1498: Ogier II La Grange
- 1498-1501: Nicolas V
- 1501-1504: Jean Renauld VII
- 1504-1506: Denis
- 1506-1545: Jean VIII Scépeaux

Commendatory abbots

- 1545-1553: Louis I de Foligny
- 1553-1589: Louis II de Breze
- 1589-1625: Alexandre de La Marck
- 1625-1661: Louis III de La Marck
- 1661-1709: Paul Godet des Marais de la Marck
- 1709-1746: Charles-François des Moustiers Mérinville
- 1746-1759: Francis Jerome de Montigny
- 1760-1776: Justinian Boffin Puisigneux
- 1777-1790: Jean-Charles de Courcy

Trappist priors and abbot

- 1876-1881: Nivard Fournier, prior
- 1881-1886: Augustin Marre, prior
- 1886-1922: Augustin Marre, Abbot

Trappist abbesses

- 1933-1936: Mary I Gastineau Alphonse
- 1936-1948: Marie Deschamps Lucia II
- 1948-1951: Andrée Lavaux (1)
- 1951-1956: Lutgarde Lehalle
- 1956-1958: Andrée Lavaux (2)
- 1958-1969: Marie III Aleth Girondelot
- 1970-1999: Marie Denis IV Aelred
- 1999-2008: Marie Rose V Flanders
- 2008–2014: Inès Gravier, apostolic administrator
- 2014–present: Isabelle Valez

== Sources ==
- Abbaye d'Igny website (in French)
