= Guerric of Igny =

Cistercian abbot (c. 1070/80-1157)

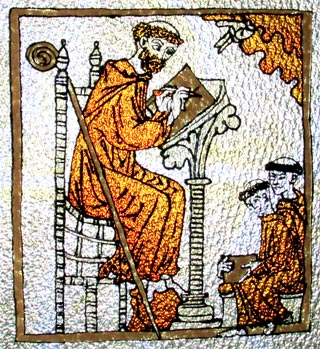

Abbot
- Honored in: Catholic Church
- Major shrine: Igny Abbey
- Feast: 19 August
- Major works: Sermons

Guerric of Igny (c. 1070/80-1157) was a Cistercian abbot.

Little is known about his early life. He may have been educated at Tournai's cathedral school, perhaps under Benedictine monk, Odo of Cambrai. Guerric appears to have lived a life of prayer and study near the Tournai Cathedral. His monastic formation was directly influenced by Bernard of Clairvaux, who praises him in several letters. In 1138, he became abbot of Igny Abbey, in the diocese of Rheims, a house dependent on Clairvaux. Here Guerric ruled as abbot until his death on 19 August 1157. It was here that he composed the 54 liturgical sermons that constitute his surviving works.

His spirituality was said to be influenced by Origen. Guerric was raised to the rank of Blessed; his relics are still venerated in Igny.
