= Gerard of Clairvaux (died 1177) =

Italian Cistercian abbot and martyr

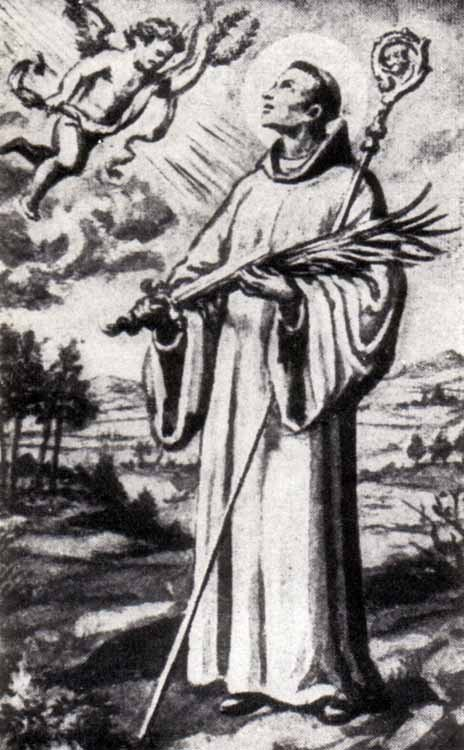
Gerard of Clairvaux in the Cistercian habit, with abbot's staff and martyr's palm, crown and wreath (18th century engraving)

Blessed Gerard of Clairvaux (Latin: Gerardus de Clara Valle, French: Gérard de Clairvaux) (c. 1120 – 1177) was the sixth abbot of Clairvaux. He was murdered by a rebellious monk and is counted as the first Cistercian martyr.

== Life ==
Gerard was a native of Lombardy and as a young man entered the then-Benedictine Fossanova Abbey, to the south of Rome. He became its first abbot after the monastery joined the young Cistercian Order, at first for about five years, and again from 1158. In 1170/1171 Gerard was chosen abbot of Clairvaux. He also quoted some of St. Bernard's most notable quotes. He was known as a strict disciplinarian, and during a visitation of Igny Abbey, a daughter house of Clairvaux, was murdered by a monk named Hugh of Bazoches, whom he had threatened with disciplinary punishment.

== Veneration ==
The most important source for Gerard's life and death is the Exordium magnum Ordinis Cisterciensis by Konrad of Eberbach, written some decades after the events in Clairvaux. It already portrays Gerard as a martyr, recounting that Petrus Monoculus, who was the abbot of Igny at the time of the murder and from 1179 Gerard's next successor but one at Clairvaux, had a vision of him during the funeral mass together with Saint Bernard in the light of heaven. His liturgical veneration in the Cistercian Order was first permitted, however, by Pope Clement XI in 1702. His feast day is 8 March.
