= Garnier de Rochefort =

Garnier de Rochefort (died c. 1225) was a French churchman who was successively abbot of Auberive (1175–1180), abbot of Clairvaux (1186–1193) and Bishop of Langres (1193–1199).

Garnier was descended from a noble family of Rochefort-sur-Brévon. He first became a monk at the Longuay Abbey. In 1180, he became the prior, then in 1186 abbot, of Clairvaux. In 1193, on the death of Manassès de Bar, he was elected bishop of Langres. Charged in Rome with profligate overspending by Hilduin de Vendeuvre, he was suspended by Pope Innocent III. He then made a pilgrimage to the Holy Land. On his return, he resigned and retired to Clairvaux until his death, which likely occurred in 1225 (though certain 19th-century historians say 1200).
