= Claude Gueux =

1834 story by Victor Hugo

"Claude Gueux" (French pronunciation: [klod ɡø]) is a short story written by Victor Hugo in 1834. It is considered an early example of "true crime" fiction, and contains Hugo's early thoughts on societal injustice which thirty years later he would flesh out in his novel Les Misérables. Charles Carlier, merchant, and editor of the Revue de Paris considered the work to be of such great educational value that he arranged for copies to be sent to all the deputies in France.

== Plot ==
Claude Gueux is a poor, hungry inhabitant of Troyes, who has received no education or help from society whatsoever. One day, missing of everything, he steals enough for three days of firewood and bread to feed his mistress and child. But he is caught, condemned to five years and sent to the Clairvaux Prison, an old abbey turned into a high-security detention center. There, the prisoners work as tailors in dirty workshops by day, and sleep in musty cells by night. Before going to sleep, they are given small portions of food to be able to survive through the following day. But Claude Gueux is a big eater, and the tiny quantities of food he is given are not large enough for him. So one of his cellmates, a young and shy criminal named Albin, spontaneously offers to share his food with him. That is the starting point of a long-lasting friendship.

However, the prison is ruled by an avid, presumptuous and simply evil man, referred to as the "Director". He is jealous of Claude's innate ability to inspire friendship and obedience from all other prisoners, although he has many times used him to keep the prison under control. Seeing the friendship between Albin and Claude, he figures out the best way to irritate and hurt Claude would be to separate them forever, and he does just that. When Claude asks the Director why he has done this, the Director replies 'because I felt like it'. Claude takes this very badly, and in the following months he repeatedly asks the Director to bring back Albin to him. As the Director never does it, Claude makes a radical decision: he will kill the Director. So one day, he obtains an axe and a pair of scissors at the prison workshop, and waits there for the Director's night time inspection. When the Director arrives, he asks Claude, who isn't supposed to be in the workshop, 'why are you over here?'. Claude then asks the director one last time to free Albin. Once again, the Director refuses. The Director says 'don't mention it again, stop boring me'. Claude again asks why he did this to him, and the Director once again replies 'because I felt like it'. Claude then slices the Directors skull open with the axe and kills him. Immediately afterwards, Claude tries to kill himself with the scissors by repeatedly stabbing them into his own chest.

But Claude does not die, and a judicial inquiry begins in which he admits murdering the Director and gives the reason as being that he felt like it. He then becomes ill for a few months as a result of his wounds, and when he has fully recovered, he appears before the assize court of Troyes. In court, Claude makes an eloquent speech in which he calmly tells the judge the full details of the events which had provoked him to commit the crime of murder, and he admits his guilt. However, when the King's attorney then states that Claude Gueux had committed the murder unprovoked, Claude becomes angry and he reiterates a long series of acts of extreme provocation on the part of the Director. The president of the court then sums up the case, and in doing so he only mentions the facts about Claude Gueux which are adverse, albeit incontrovertibly true. Claude is then found guilty and sentenced to death.

Claude declines to appeal, but upon returning to the prison, a nun who had nursed him when he was recovering from his wounds, begs him to reconsider. He agrees out of gratitude, although he knows very well his request won't be listened to. In the following days, he is forbidden to come out from his cell or even to go to the workshops. His friends in the prison throw various objects into his room with which he could easily, according to the writer, escape from the jail. But Claude just returns those objects to the guardians.

Finally comes the day in which he is to be executed, his demand for reconsideration having been refused. He is brought to a Catholic priest, to which he asks pardon for all his past sins. He sees the man that will bring an end to his life, and declares he does not consider him guilty of anything and pardons him completely. Then, a coach escorts him to the marketplace of Troyes, where a guillotine has been prepared. Before getting executed, he gives a coin, his only possession, to the priest that has come with him, and asks him to give it to the poor. Then, the guillotine's blade falls upon his neck, and he dies.

A lengthy epilogue follows the story, in which Victor Hugo criticizes the lack of proportionality as between education and criminal punishment, and the cruel French society of the nineteenth century. The last part of his speech is directly meant for French legislators.
