= Ville-sous-la-Ferté =

Commune in Grand Est, France

- Commune
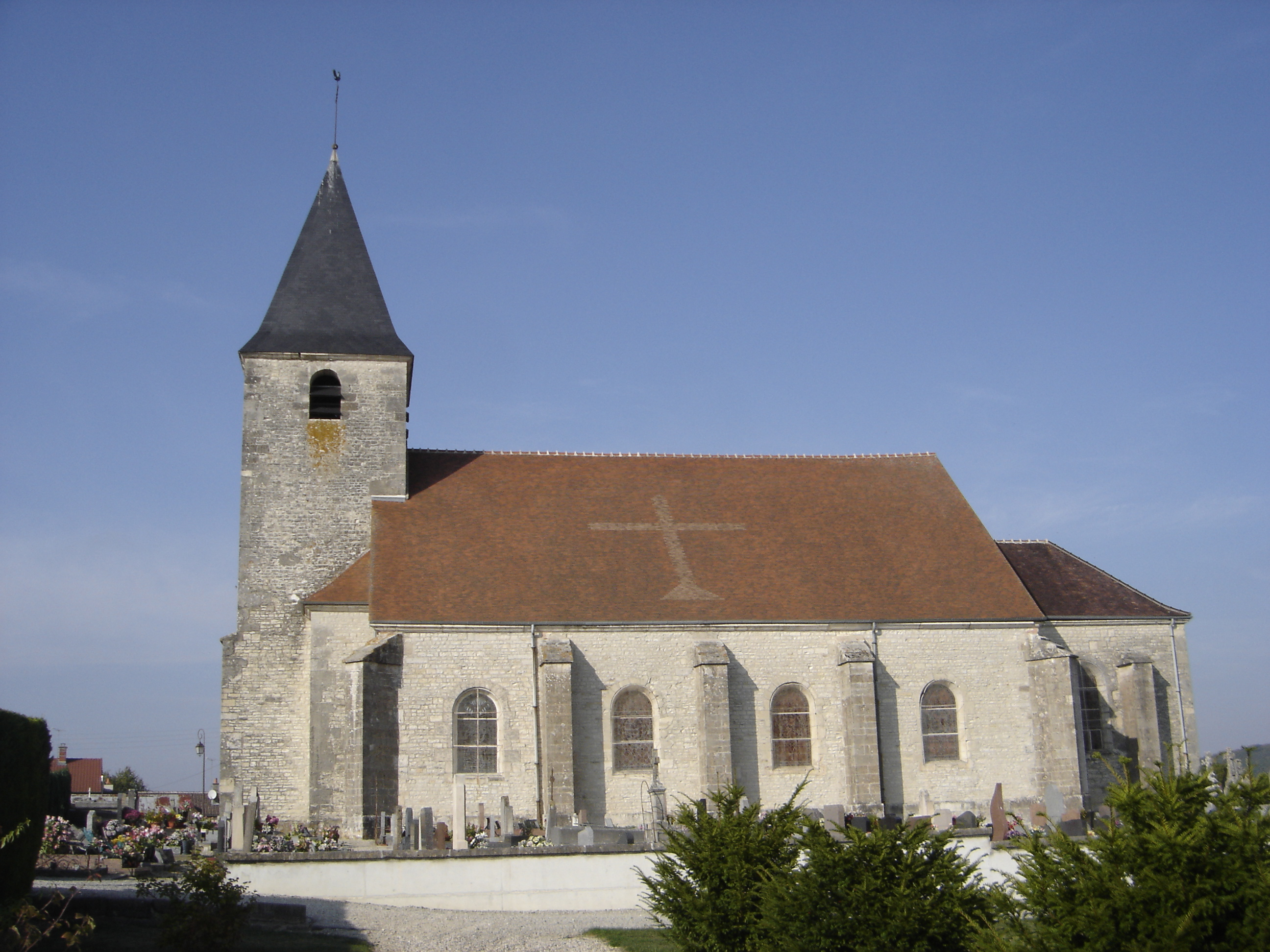
- The church in Ville-sous-la-Ferté

- Coat of arms
- Location of Ville-sous-la-Ferté
- Location within France Location within Grand Est
- Coordinates: 48°07′19″N 4°47′27″E
- Country: France
- Region: Grand Est
- Department: Aube
- Arrondissement: Bar-sur-Aube
- Canton: Bar-sur-Aube
- Intercommunality: Région de Bar-sur-Aube

Government
  - Mayor (2020–2026): Gérard Picod
- Area^{1}: 19.77 km^{2} (7.63 sq mi)
- Elevation: 208 m (682 ft)
- Population (2023): 906
  - Density: 45.8/km^{2} (119/sq mi)
- Time zone: UTC+01:00 (CET)
  - Summer (DST): UTC+02:00 (CEST)
- INSEE/Postal code: 10426 /10310
- ^{1} French Land Register data, which excludes lakes, ponds, glaciers > 1 km^{2} (0.386 sq mi or 247 acres) and river estuaries.

Ville-sous-la-Ferté (French pronunciation: [vil su la fɛʁte]) is a commune in the Aube department in the Grand Est region in north-central France.

The best-known landmark of Ville-sous-la-Ferté is the nearby ruin of Clairvaux Abbey, now the site of Clairvaux Prison.

== Population ==
Historical population
Year	Pop.	±% p.a.
1968	1,854	—
1975	1,579	−2.27%
1982	1,570	−0.08%
1990	1,451	−0.98%
1999	1,276	−1.42%
2007	1,328	+0.50%
2012	1,098	−3.73%
2017	1,066	−0.59%
2023	906	−2.67%
Source: INSEE

== See also ==
- Communes of the Aube department
