= Clairvaux Prison =

High-security prison in France

Maison centrale de Clairvaux
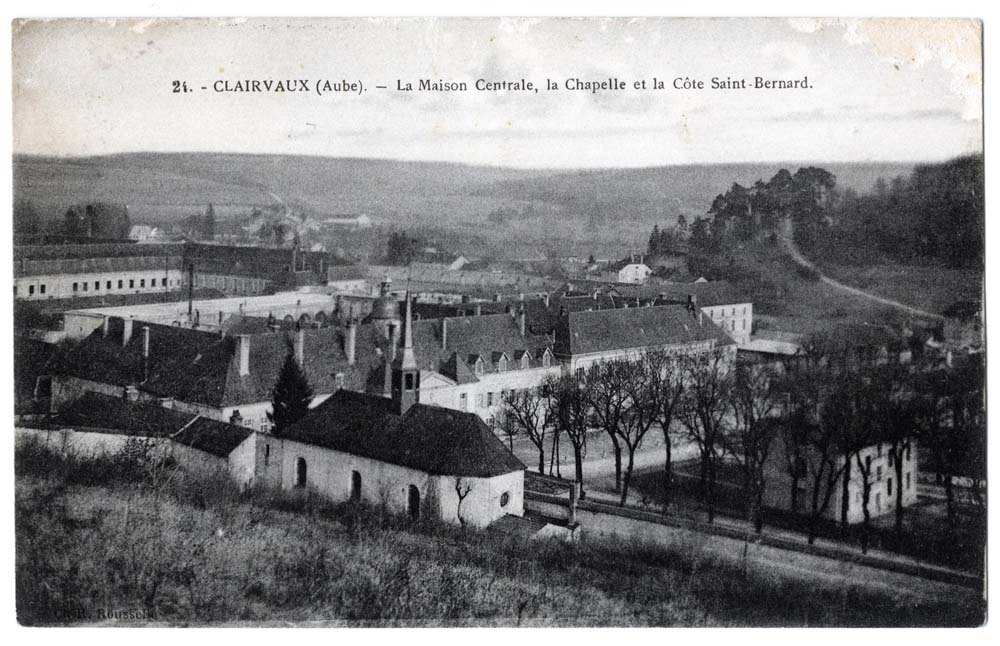
- View of the prison in the early 20th century
- Interactive map of Maison centrale de Clairvaux
- Location: Ville-sous-la-Ferté, France; 48°08′38″N 04°47′43″E
- Status: Closed
- Capacity: 240 (2015)
- Population: 40 (2022)
- Opened: 1804
- Closed: 2023
- Managed by: French Ministry of Justice

Clairvaux Prison was a high-security prison in France, on the grounds of the former Clairvaux Abbey.

== History ==
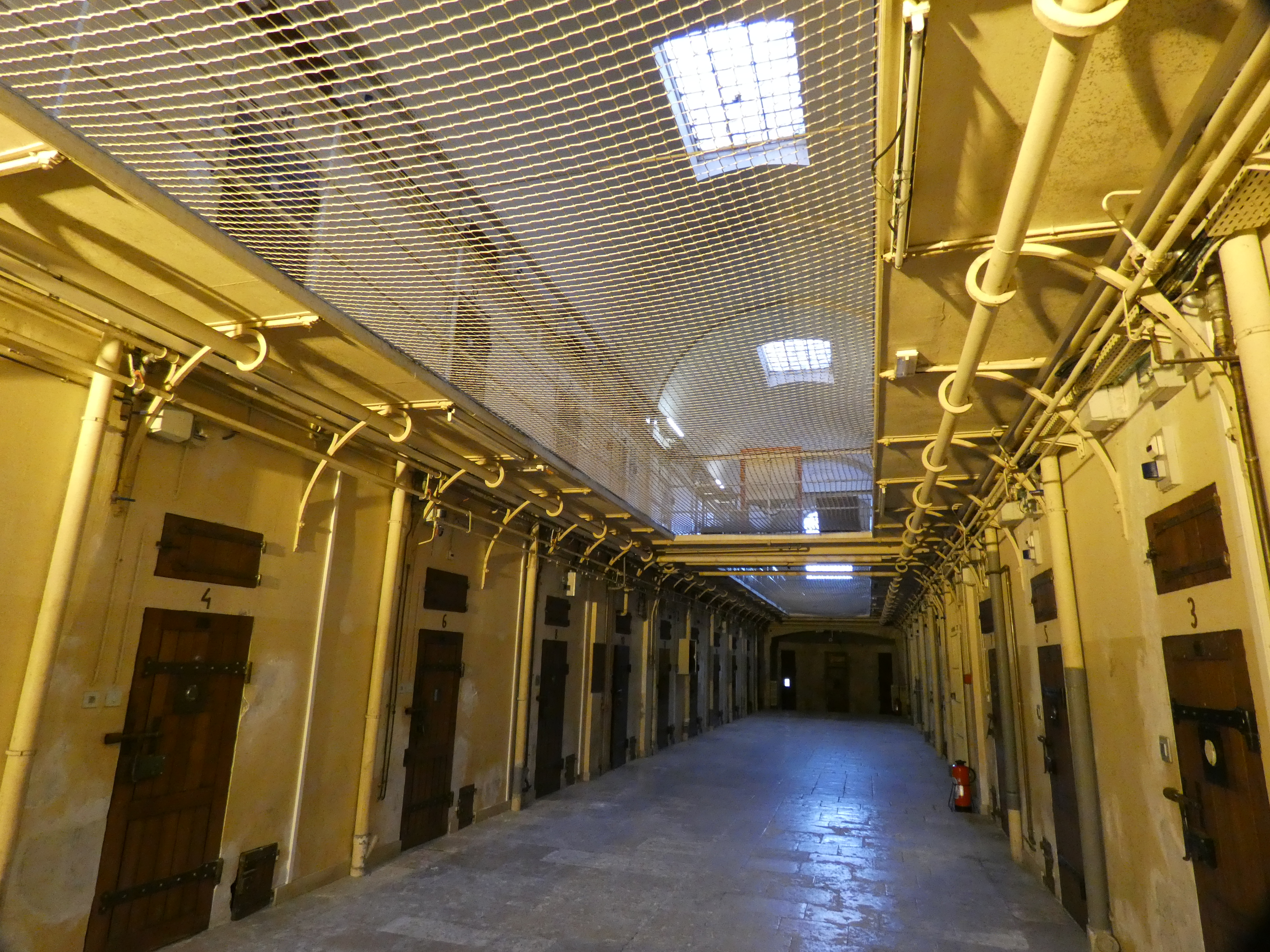
Former disciplinary quarter (ground floor) and isolation cells (above)

Clairvaux Abbey was founded in 1115 by Bernard of Clairvaux. In 1789, during the French Revolution, it became property of the State. In 1804, Napoleon turned it into a prison. This fate was not uncommon for abbeys at the time, as monastic cells could easily be converted into prison cells in the absence of monks.

The entire complex was converted: the medieval Lay Brothers' Building was converted into a women's prison, while the main abbey was made a men's prison. In 1812, the medieval abbey church was sold off as a quarry by the prison's director; as a result, the director was dismissed and the old refectory was converted into a chapel for prisoners. At its peak, the prison housed over 2,700 inmates, including 500 women and 550 children. Deplorable conditions at the abbey inspired Victor Hugo to write his short story "Claude Gueux", based on a real prisoner at Clairvaux, in 1834.

The initial prisoners were rebellious soldiers. After the collapse of the Paris Commune in 1871, a number of Communards were held there. During World War II, Clairvaux was known as a particularly harsh facility for enemies of the Vichy Regime.

=== 1971 revolt ===
In 1971, two convicts, Claude Buffet and Roger Bontems, took a nurse, Nicole Comte, and a prison guard, Guy Girardot, hostage. Buffet subsequently murdered them. Buffet and Bontems were captured. Bontems, whose defence counsel included Robert Badinter, contended that the murder was Buffet's idea. Buffet said that he wanted death. Both were sentenced to death by the assize court in June 1972 and were guillotined.

After the revolt, the prison's historic facilities were opened to visitors under the joint administration of the Ministry of Culture and the Ministry of Justice, and a more modern facility was constructed adjacent to the abbey buildings.

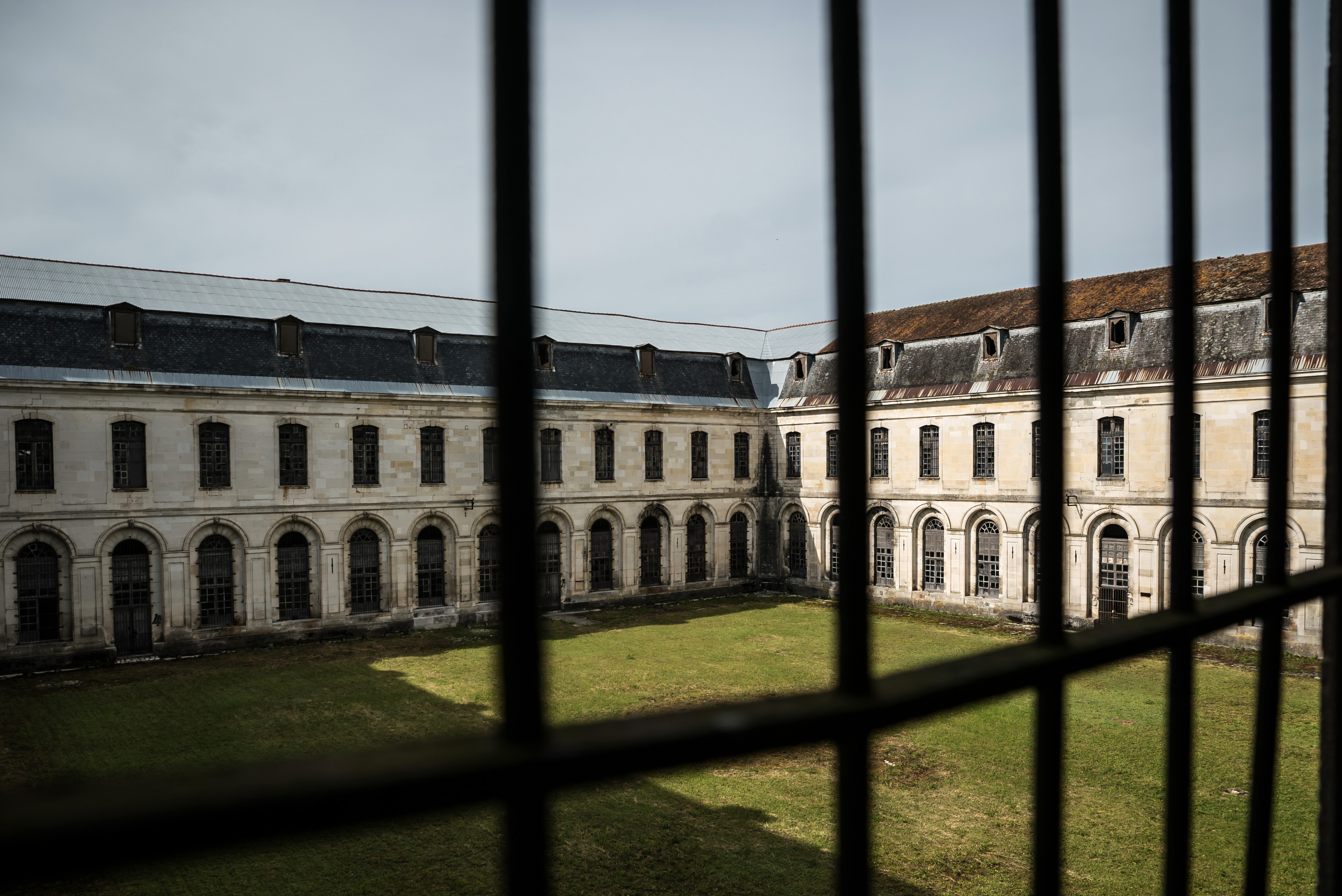
The former cloister of the abbey, renovated into an exercise yard in the 19th century

=== 2006 manifesto ===
On 16 January 2006, several detainees who were serving life sentences in Clairvaux Prison, having each spent from 6 to 28 years in prison, signed a manifesto denouncing the "false" abolition of the death penalty. They declared that it had resulted in a slow and continuous punishment, a death in life. They called for restoration of the death penalty.

The convicts specifically denounced the French Republic which claimed, in accordance with the "advises of the European Council", that the "enforcing of prison sentences... has been conceived not only to protect society and assure the punishment of the convict, but also to favour his amendment and prepare his rehabilitation". They stated, "In reality: everything is for the punishment."

== Present day ==
As of 2022, there were forty prisoners held at the facility, but by September 2023 they were transferred to the new Troyes-Lavau Remand Center. Clairvaux Abbey shut down in 2023, and the French state aims to sell the property for a conversion into a tourist site. Apart from the 1971 penitentiary, the former abbey is designated as a Monument historique.

== Notable prisoners ==
- Revolutionary theorist Auguste Blanqui was held at Clairvaux from 1872 to 1877
- The Russian anarchist Peter Kropotkin was imprisoned in Clairvaux for the four years between 1883 and 1886.
- André Marty was imprisoned at Clairvaux after the Black Sea Mutiny, but was pardoned in 1923.
- During the occupation of France, many political prisoners and resistance fighters were imprisoned at Clairvaux, including Guy Môquet. Prisoners were sent from Clairvaux to Auschwitz, and 21 people were executed near Clairvaux in 1942.
- Following the liberation of France, a number of prominent figures in the Vichy Government were held at Clairvaux, including Charles Maurras, Lucien Rebatet, Jean de Laborde, Pierre-Antoine Cousteau, Jacques Benoist-Méchin, and Paul Merion.
- After the abortive Algiers putsch of 1961, Generals Maurice Challe, André Zeller, Jean-Louis Nicot, and Hélie de Saint Marc were incarcerated at Clairvaux.
- Carlos the Jackal, international terrorist, was transferred to Clairvaux in 2006. He was later transferred to Poissy Prison, where he currently remains incarcerated.
- Serial killer Guy Georges was held at Clairvaux.

== In fiction ==
- Victor Hugo's short story "Claude Gueux" is set in Clairvaux.

== Sources ==
- Clairvaux Prison - Ministry of Justice (in French)
