= Clairvaux Abbey =

Former Cistercian monastery in Aube, France

- Abbaye Notre-Dame de Clairvaux
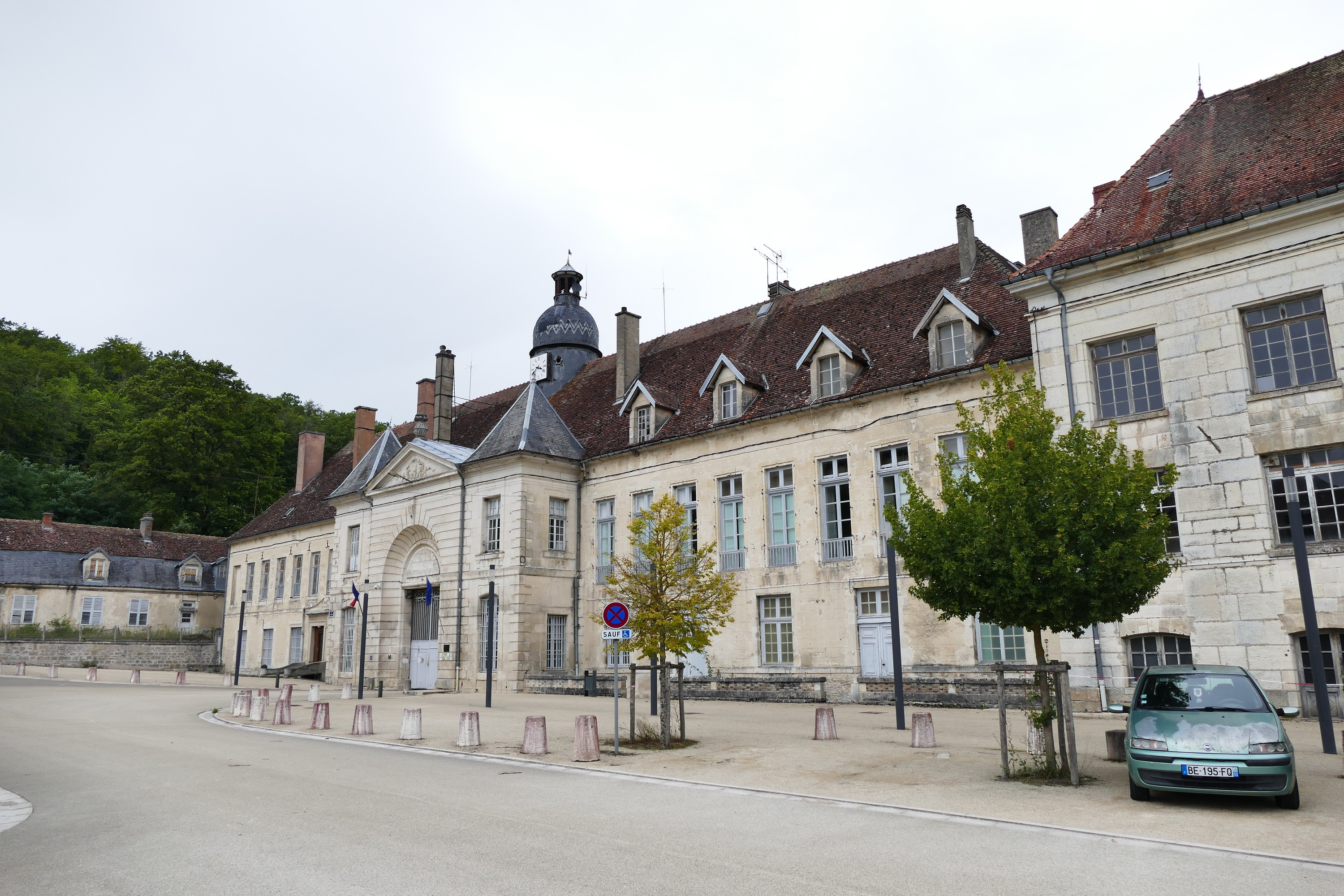
- The main entrance to the abbey

- Location within France

Monastery information
- Order: Cistercian
- Established: 1115
- Disestablished: 1789
- Mother house: Cîteaux Abbey
- Dedication: Our Lady of Clairvaux

People
- Founder: Bernard of Clairvaux

Architecture
- Status: inactive

Site
- Location: Ville-sous-la-Ferté, France
- Coordinates: 48°08′50″N 4°47′20″E
- Visible remains: substantial
- Public access: yes

Clairvaux Abbey (/klɛərˈvoʊ/, French: [klɛʁvo] l’abbaye de Clairvaux; Latin: Clara Vallis) was a Cistercian monastery in Ville-sous-la-Ferté, 15 kilometres (9.3 mi) from Bar-sur-Aube. The abbey was founded in 1115 by Bernard of Clairvaux. As a primary abbey, it was one of the most significant monasteries in the order. Dissolved during the French Revolution, it was used from 1808 to 2023 as Clairvaux Prison, a high-security correctional facility. As of 2024, the site was being converted to a tourist destination.

Its layout was significantly altered by construction in the 18th and 19th centuries. Before it was a prison, Clairvaux Abbey served as an archetype for Cistercian monasteries; significant portions of the ancient abbey remain standing.

== History ==
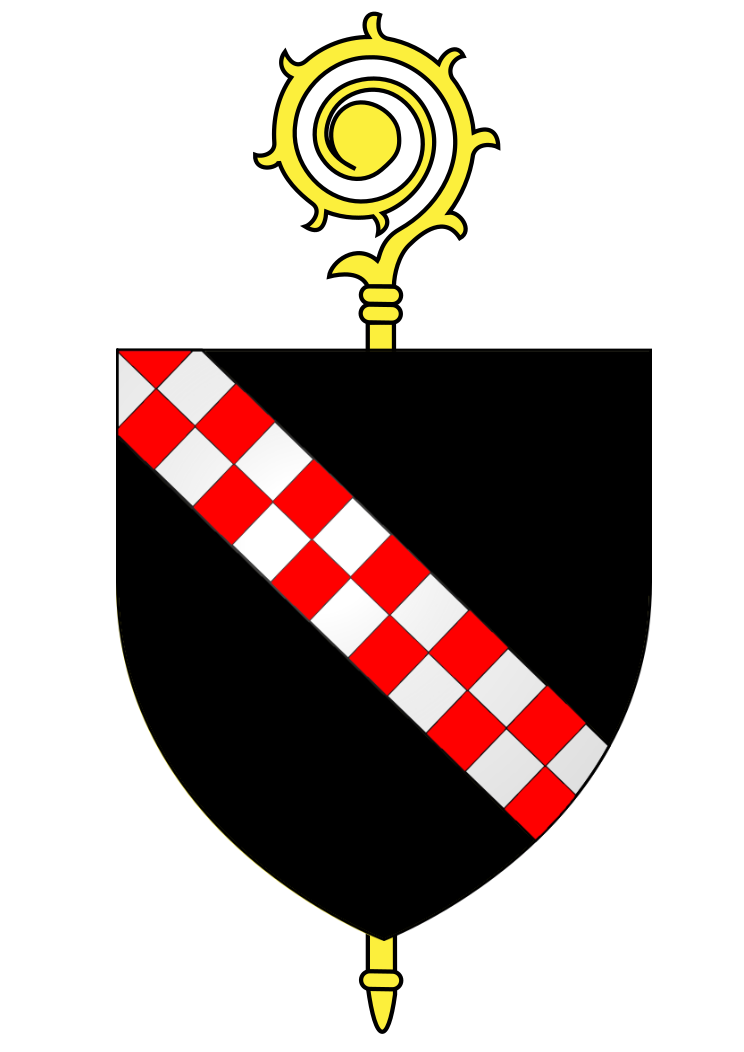
Abbatial arms

=== Founding to dissolution ===
According to legend, on 25 June 1115 the Cistercian monk Bernard was sent from Cîteaux Abbey with a group of twelve other monks to found a new monastery at Vallée d'Absinthe. Hughes I, Count of Troyes and a relative of Bernard, donated this valley to the Cistercians. The monastery was dedicated to the Virgin Mary on October 13, 1115, which became the feast day of Our Lady of Clairvaux. Bernard was installed as first abbot by William of Champeaux, Bishop of Châlons-sur-Marne.

The abbey developed rapidly, eventually reaching its peak in numbers at 700 members belonging to Clairvaux alone, thus the largest Cistercian abbey in France. Many daughter monasteries followed. In 1118 Trois-Fontaines Abbey was founded from Clairvaux on land donated by Hugh de Vitry. Many nobles were buried there. Later, Clairvaux founded Foigny Abbey (1121), and Cherlieu Abbey was founded in 1131. During Bernard's lifetime over sixty monasteries were founded from Clairvaux all over Europe and reaching into Scandinavia. Many ("over a third of them") were pre-existing communities of monks, canons, or hermits who had decided to join the Cistercian movement.

Construction of the abbey in its medieval form (named Clairvaux II by historians, in the manner of Cluny I, II, and III) began in 1135, and the abbey church was dedicated in 1174. However, the only building surviving from this time is a large 12th-century lay brother's building, eventually converted into a barn. By the end of the Middle Ages, it had founded 530 abbeys across Europe. As the mother of so many, Clairvaux occupied a central place in the Cistercian world.

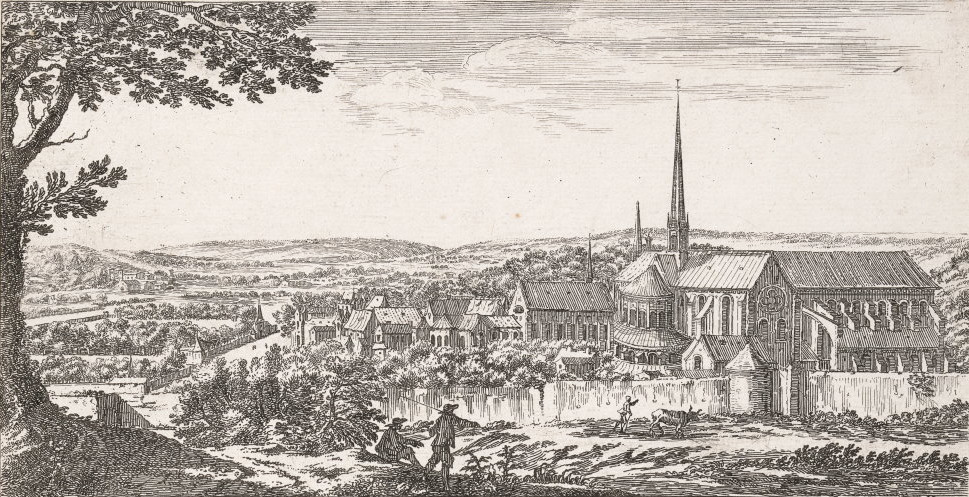
An early 18th-century view of the abbey, prior to the reconstruction that began in 1708

Clairvaux continued to attract promising monks; one of them became a pope (Eugene III), twelve became cardinals, and over thirty were elevated to the episcopacy. The manuscripts copied and written at Clairvaux were of great importance. Research about the monks' literary and theological studies have led to a research project that seeks to reconstruct the abbey's medieval library. In the 13th century, Clairvaux Abbot Stephen Lexington founded the Cistercian college at the University of Paris and it remained under the abbey's responsibility for generations.

In the early modern period, Clairvaux was the nucleus of the movement toward stricter observance, particularly under Abbot Denis Largentier in the 16th and 17th centuries. Starting in 1708, comprehensive reconstruction of the abbey's buildings in the classical style began, dubbed Clairvaux III by historians. The works were wide-ranging, and records indicate that construction was not complete upon the arrival of the revolution.

Clairvaux's library was of particular note, it expanded continuously through the Middle Ages and early modern period. At the time of its dissolution, it housed 40,000 volumes. Its collection of medieval manuscripts inventoried by Abbot Pierre de Virey, of which 1,115 of 1,790 survive, constitutes the largest of its kind, and is exceptionally well-preserved. This collection is today housed in the Troyes-Champagne Médiathèque, the Bibliothèque nationale de France, and the University of Montpelier's Faculty of Medicine.

=== Revolution to present day ===
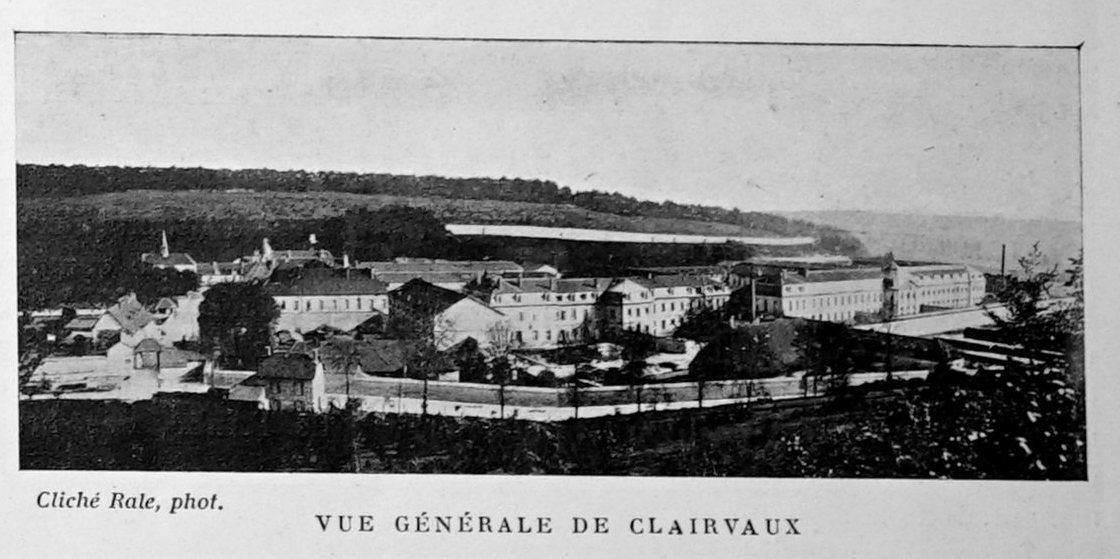
The prison as it appeared in 1901

At the time of the French Revolution in 1789, Clairvaux had only 26 professed religious, counting the abbot, Louis-Marie Rocourt, ten lay brothers, and ten affiliated pensioners of the house; 19 of the religious and all the lay brothers were secularized. The relics of Bernard of Clairvaux were moved from the abbey church to Troyes Cathedral.

Having become state property according to the decree of 2 November 1789, the abbey was purchased in 1792 and converted into a glassworks, which was repossessed by the state upon its bankruptcy in 1804 and turned into a prison. This fate was not uncommon for former monasteries following the penal reforms of Napoleon, it also befell others like Fontevraud and Mont-Saint-Michel. Because the abbey church was sold off as a quarry in 1812, a small new chapel was built inside the former refectory in 1828. During the 19th century, the abbey held 2,700 prisoners, including 500 women and 550 children. Deplorable conditions at the abbey inspired Victor Hugo to write his short story "Claude Gueux", based on a real prisoner at Clairvaux, in 1834. Following a reform in 1875 that required individual cells for prisoners, "chicken cages", cells measuring 1.5 x 2-meter (5 x 6.5 ft), were installed, they remained in use until 1971. The abbey was designated a monument historique in 1926 by the French Ministry of Culture. Only one of the surviving buildings, that of the lay brothers, is medieval in origin (albeit erected after Bernard had died).

Starting in the 2000s, the prison was gradually dismantled. Comprehensive restorations began in 2013, and the prison was finally shut down in 2023. Renovation of the historic Abbey buildings has been underway since 2021, the 20th century correctional additions will be demolished as part of the conversion of the campus to a tourist site.

== List of abbots ==
- 1115–1153 — Bernard of Clairvaux
- 1153–1157 — Robert I of Bruges
- 1157-vers 1161 — Fastradus
- 1162–1165 — Geoffrey of Auxerre
- 1165–1170 — Pons of Polignac
- 1170–1175 — Gerard I
- 1176–1179 — Henry of Marcy
- 1179–1186 — Peter I Monoculus
- 1186–1193 — Garnier de Rochefort
- 1193–1196 — Guy of France
- c. 1214–1216 — Conrad I of Urach
- 1217–1221 — William I
- 1221–1223 — Robert II
- 1223–1224 — Lawrence
- 1224–1232 — Raoul de la Roche-Aymon
- 1233–1235 — Dreux de Grandmont
- 1235–1238 — Evrard
- 1238–1239 — William of Dongelberg
- 1242–1255 — Stephen I of Lexington
- 1257–1260 or 1261 — John I
- 1262–1273 — Philip I
- 1273–1280 — Beuve
- 1280–1284 — Thibaud de Sancey
- 1284–1285 — Gerard II
- 1286–1291 — Jean II de La Prée
- 1291–1312 — Jean III de Sancey
- 1312 — William III
- 1313–1316 — Conrad II of Metz
- 1316–1330 — Mathieu I d'Aumelle
- 1330–1345 — Jean IV d'Aizanville
- 1345–1358 — Bernard II de Laon
- 1358–1359 — Jean V de Bussières
- 1363–1380 — Jean VI de Deulemont
- 1380–1402 — Étienne II de Foissy
- 1402–1405 — Jean VII de Martigny
- 1405–1428 — Mathieu II Pillaert
- 1428–1448 — Guillaume IV d'Autun
- 1449–1471 — Philippe II de Fontaines
- 1471–1496 — Pierre II de Virey
- 1496–1509 — Jean VIII de Foucault
- 1509–1552 — Edmond de Saulieu
- 1552–1571 — Jérôme Souchier
- 1571–1596 — Lupin Lemire
- 1596–1626 — Denis Largentier
- 1626–1653 — Claude Largentier
- 1654–1676 — Pierre III Henry
- 1676–1718 — Pierre IV Bouchu
- 1718–1740 — Robert III Gassot du Deffend
- 1740–1761 — Pierre V Mayeur
- 1761–1784 — François Le Blois
- 1784–1792 — Louis-Marie Rocourt

== Burials ==
- Henry of France, Archbishop of Reims (1175)
- Philip I, Count of Flanders
- Saint Malachy
- Bernard of Clairvaux
- Theresa of Portugal, Countess of Flanders
- Giacomo da Pecorara

== See also ==
- Chiaravalle Abbey, a monastery in Milan, Italy
- Claraval in Brazil: the same name in Portuguese; also the seat of a former territorial abbey
