= Wāli =

Administrative title used for governors in the Muslim world

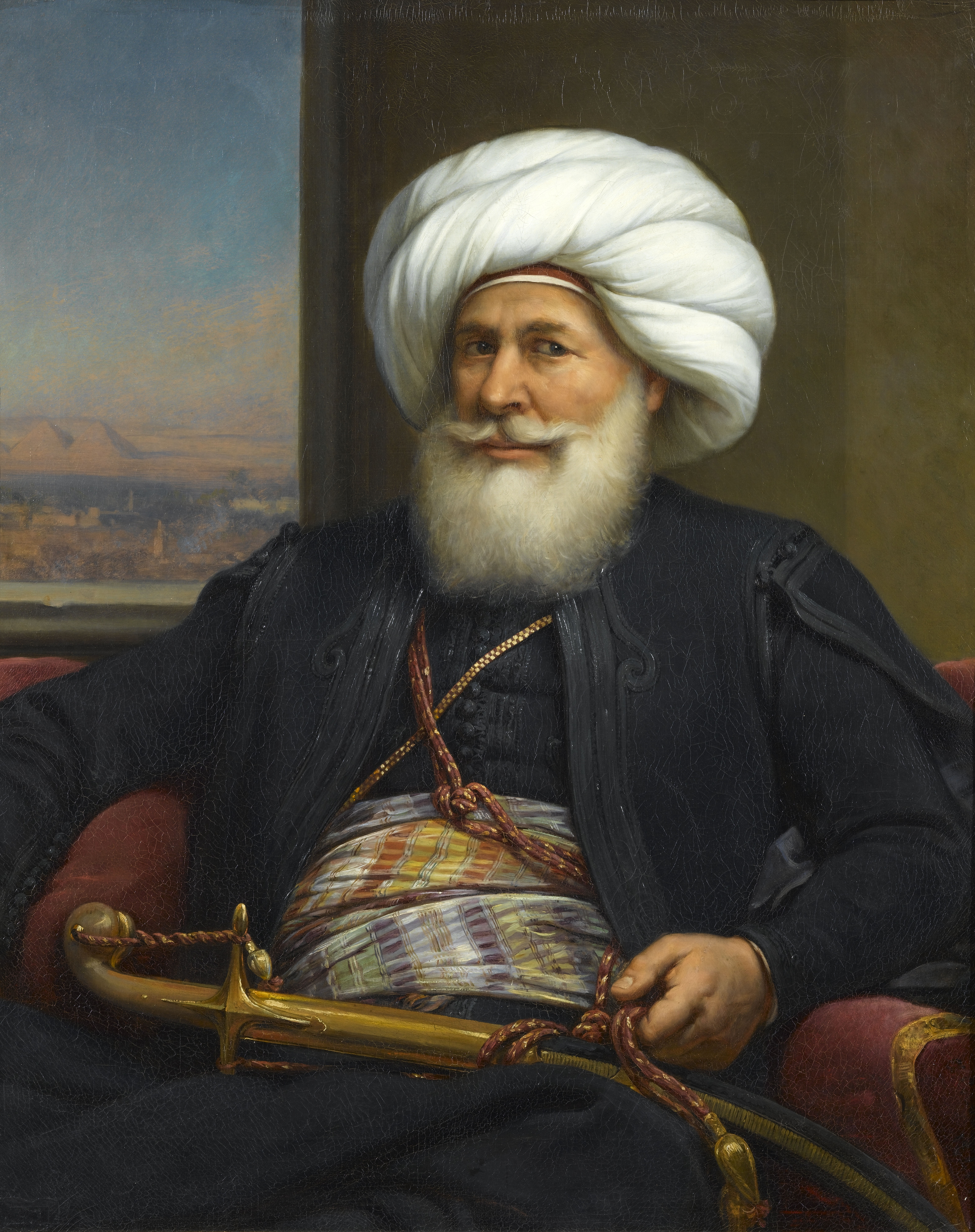
Mehemet Ali Viceroy of Egypt, by Auguste Couder, 1841.

Rostom (Rostam Khan), Safavid viceroy of Kartli, Georgia.

Wāli, wā'lī or vali (from Arabic: والي) is an administrative title used in the Muslim world to designate the governor of an administrative division. It was used in a number of historical Islamic states, including the Rashidun, Umayyad, Abbasid and Ottoman empires. The division governed by a wāli is called a wilaya; in the Ottoman Empire, the corresponding term was vilayet. The title remains in use in some countries influenced by Arabic or Ottoman administrative traditions.

== Historic usage ==
=== Iran ===
In the history of Iran, Vāli referred to a high-ranking provincial governor or, in some cases, a semi-autonomous local ruler. During the Safavid era (1501–1736), the title was applied to rulers of strategically important frontier regions. These included the Georgian kingdoms of Kartli and Kakheti, the Kurdish principality of Ardalan, and tribal regions such as Lorestan and Khuzestan in western Iran.

These Vālis were often hereditary rulers who retained a degree of autonomy while acknowledging Safavid suzerainty. They were considered roughly equivalent in status to governors of major provinces (beylerbeyliks) and played a key role in defending Iran’s frontiers, particularly against the Ottoman Empire.

During the Qajar era (1789–1925), central authority increased and many hereditary governorships were replaced by appointed officials. Members of the royal family and prominent elites were frequently assigned as Vāli of major provinces. Notably, the crown prince traditionally served as the Vāli of Azerbaijan, which functioned as an important administrative and military center.

=== Ottoman Empire ===
Vali (Ottoman Turkish: والی) was the title of a provincial governor in the Ottoman Empire, responsible for administering a vilayet (province). The term became standardized following the administrative reforms of the 19th century, particularly the Vilayet Law of 1864.

Under this system, the empire was organized into a hierarchy: vilayet—sanjak—kaza—nahiye. The Vali governed the vilayet and was appointed by the Sultan. Subordinate officials included the mutasarrif (governor of a sanjak), the kaymakam (district governor), and the mudür (subdistrict administrator), with village affairs handled by a muhtar.

Before these reforms, provincial administration was organized differently. Large provinces were governed by beylerbeys, and the provinces themselves were called beylerbeyliks. The shift to the vilayet system marked a move toward centralization and bureaucratic standardization.

Valis were often experienced statesmen or military officials, commonly holding the rank of pasha. Their duties included tax collection, maintaining order, overseeing local administration, and implementing imperial policies. (Note: Translations of vali in languages used within the Ottoman Empire included: Armenian: կուսակալ (kusakal), meaning “governor”; Greek: γενικός διοικητής (genikos dioikētēs), νομάρχης (nomarchēs), or valē (βαλή); Judaeo-Spanish: governador de provinsiya; Ottoman Turkish: والی (vali); Bulgarian: vali, sometimes explained as glaven upravitel (“governor-general”); Serbo-Croatian: valija.)

=== Oman ===
In the history of the Sultanate of Oman, the title wali was used for governors appointed to administer territories under Omani control. During the 17th to 19th centuries, when Oman exerted influence over parts of the East African coast, including Mombasa in present-day Kenya, a wali was appointed as the السلطان’s representative in the city.

In modern Oman, the term Wilayat refers to an administrative division (district), and a wali serves as its appointed governor. The system remains part of the country’s administrative structure today.

=== Pakistan ===
In the history of Pakistan, the title Wali was used by the rulers of the former princely state of Swat. The Wali of Swat governed the region as an autonomous ruler under indirect British rule during the colonial period and later under the government of Pakistan until the state was formally integrated in 1969.

== Contemporary usage ==
=== Algeria ===
In Algeria, a wāli is the governor and chief executive of each of the country's 69 provinces (wilayas). Wālis are appointed by the President and are responsible for implementing national policies, overseeing local administration, and coordinating public services at the provincial level.

=== Morocco ===
In Morocco, following the regionalisation reforms of 1997 and their expansion in 2015, a wāli is the representative of the central government in one of the country's regions. The wāli oversees regional governance, coordinates state services, and supervises provincial governors (governors) within the region.

=== Philippines ===
In the Philippines, the Wa'lī is the ceremonial head of the Bangsamoro, an autonomous region in Mindanao. The position was established under the Bangsamoro Organic Law. The Wa'lī performs symbolic and constitutional functions, including administering oaths of office, convening and dissolving the Bangsamoro Parliament, and acting as a moral guardian of the region’s autonomy. The role is non-executive and distinct from the Chief Minister, who serves as the head of government.

=== Tunisia ===
In Tunisia, a wāli is the governor of one of the country's 24 governorates. Wālis are appointed by the President and act as representatives of the central government, overseeing regional administration, security, and public services.

=== Turkey ===
In Turkey, a vali is the governor of one of the country's 81 provinces. Valis are appointed by the President upon nomination by the Ministry of the Interior. They serve as the highest-ranking state officials at the provincial level, responsible for implementing government policy, maintaining public order, and supervising local administrations.

During the state of emergency (OHAL) from 1987 to 2002 in southeastern Turkey, a regional governor (sometimes informally referred to as a "super vali") was appointed with authority over multiple provinces to coordinate security and administrative measures.

== See also ==
- Governor
- Governor-general

== Sources ==
- Strauss, Johann (2010). "A Constitution for a Multilingual Empire: Translations of the Kanun-ı Esasi and Other Official Texts into Minority Languages". In Herzog, Christoph; Malek Sharif (eds.). The First Ottoman Experiment in Democracy. Würzburg: Orient-Institut Istanbul. pp. 21–51.

Regnal titles
Preceded by Sultan of Egypt	Style of the Egyptian sovereign 1517–1805	Succeeded by Khedive
