= Oriental Institute =

Oriental Institute may refer to a number of university faculties, departments, and institutes of Oriental studies:

== United States ==
- Institute for the Study of Ancient Cultures, formerly the Oriental Institute, University of Chicago

== United Kingdom ==
- Faculty of Asian and Middle Eastern Studies, formerly the Oriental Institute, University of Oxford
- SOAS University of London (School of Oriental and African Studies)
- Oriental Institute, Woking, a late 19th-century educational establishment

== Continental Europe ==
- Oriental Institute in Sarajevo, a research institute in Sarajevo, Bosnia
- Oriental Institute, ASCR, part of the Academy of Sciences of the Czech Republic in Prague
- Pontifical Oriental Institute, a Roman Catholic university in Rome, Italy
- Institut national des langues et civilisations orientales, Paris, France
- Orient-Institut Istanbul, a research institute in Istanbul, Turkey

== Asia ==
- Oriental Institute, Maharaja Sayajirao University of Baroda, India
- Bhandarkar Oriental Research Institute, Pune, India
- Oriental Institute, Far Eastern Federal University, Vladivostok, Russia

== See also ==
- Oriental Institute of Science and Technology, Bhopal, India
- Oriental Institute of Technology, now the Asia Eastern University of Science and Technology, Taiwan
- Orient-Institut Beirut, Lebanon
- Institute of Oriental Studies (disambiguation)
- Oriental Research Institute (disambiguation)
