= Abd Al Raouf Sinu =

Lebanese author

- Born: 1948 (age 76–77); Beirut, Lebanon
- Occupation: Author
- Awards: Sheikh Zayed Book Award

Abd Al Raouf Sinu (Arabic:عبد الرؤوف سنو; born 1948) is a Lebanese author who was born in Beirut. He was a member of the international delegation for Election Observation in Germany, 2009. Sinu received his PhD in philosophy of history from (The Free University of Berlin) in 1982. He served as Dean of the Faculty of Education in (The Lebanese University) from 2001 to 2004. He became a member of (The advisory board of the Orient-Institut Beirut) in Germany from 2008 till date. Also, he is a member of plenty of international and local boards, most notably are: 'The International Delegation of Germany's Election Observation', and 'The Board of Trustees of the Development, Studies, and Pedagogic Clinic Foundation in Beirut'.

Sinu won the Sheikh Zayed Book Award for his book which is titled as 'Lebanon War 1975–1990, Disintegration of the State and Fracture of Society'.

== Works ==
He has published several literary works, including:

- "The Clergy – Property and Power – Research in the Social History of Lebanon" (original title: al'iiklirus walmulkiato walsulta; 'abhath fi tarikh lubnan alaijtimaeii).
- "German Interests in Syria and Palestine 1841–1901" (original title: almasalih al'almania fi suria wa filastin 1841–1901), Arab Development Institute 1987.
- "Germany and Islam in the Nineteenth and Twentieth Centuries" (original title: 'almanya wal'iislam fi alqarnayn altaasie eashar waleishrin), Beirut: Al-Furat, 2007.
- "Lebanon War 1975–1990, Disintegration of the State and Fracture of Society" (original title: harb lubnan 1975–1990, tafakuk aldawla wa tasado almujtamae), Beirut: Arab Scientific Publishers, 2008.
- "Islamic Internal Conflicts in the Ottoman Empire 1877–1881, the Levant, Hijaz, Kurdistan, Albany" (original title: alnizaeat alkiania al'iislamia fi aldawla aleuthmania 1877–1881, bilad alshaam, alhijaz, kurdistan, 'albania ), Bissan Publishers and Distributors, 1998.
- "Saudi Arabia During the Reign of King Abdullah bin Abdulaziz" (original title: alsueudia fi eahd almalik Abd Allah bin eabd aleaziz), 2017.
- "Saudi Arabia and Lebanon: Politics and Economy, 1943–2011 – Volume II" (original title: alsueudia wa lubnan: alsiyasa waliaqtisad, 1943–2011), Al-Furat For Publishing & Distributing, Beirut, 2016.
- "Polar Cities in Lebanon: Beirut-Tripoli-Zahlé-Sidon" (original title: almudun al'aqtab fi lubnan: bayrut – tarabulus – zahla – sayda), 2018.
- "Lebanon -The Country of Communities- Post The Taif Agreement: Problems of Coexistence, Supremacy, and External Roles" (original title: lubnan altawayif fi dawla ma baed altaayif : 'iishkaliaat altaeayush walsiyadat wa'adwar alkharij), 2015.
- "The Great Lebanon, Or is Lebanon a Historical Mistake? Disputes over Entity Genesis and Identity" (original title: lubnan alkabir am lubnan khata tarikhi? : nizaeat alaa alkian nash'atan wa huiatan), written by Dr. Louis Slyba, presented by Dr. Abdel-Raouf Sinno, Dar Byblion, 2015.

== Awards ==
- Sheikh Zayed Book Award (Contribution to the Development of Nations) for his book: Lebanon War 1975–1990 Disintegration of the State and Fracture of Society.
