= Prostitution in France =

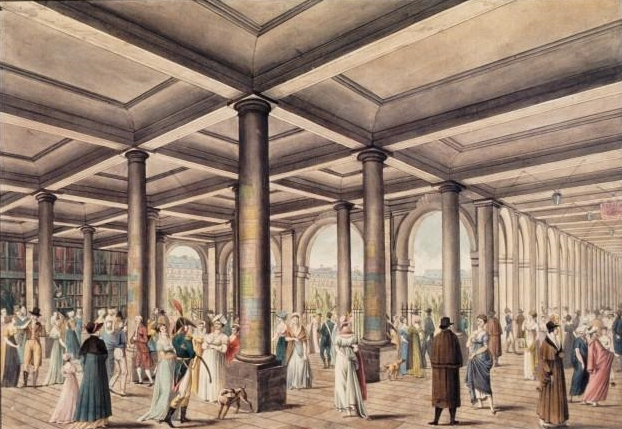
Prostitutes and clients conversing at the Palais Royal, Paris, in 1800. Ink and watercolour. Bibliothèque nationale de France

Prostitution in France (the exchange of sexual acts for money) was legal until April 2016, but several surrounding activities were illegal, like operating a brothel, living off the avails (pimping), and paying for sex with someone under the age of 18 (the age of consent for sex in France is 15).

On 6 April 2016, the French National Assembly voted to subject those found engaging with prostitutes with a fine of €1,500.

In the Napoleonic era, France became the model for the regulatory approach to prostitution. In the 20th century, however, a policy shift became apparent. Brothels became illegal in 1946, and France signed the Convention for the Suppression of the Traffic in Persons and of the Exploitation of the Prostitution of Others in 1960, thus becoming a major supporter of the international abolitionist movement for the eradication of prostitution (see Abolitionism in France).

== History ==
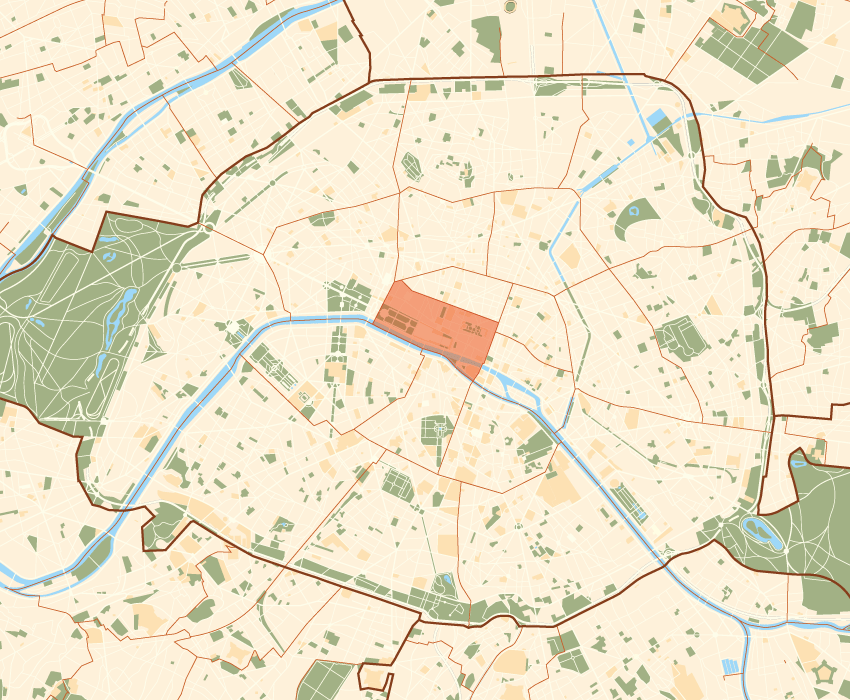
Paris arrondissements, 1st highlighted, the 2nd and 3rd to the N. & 4th to the E

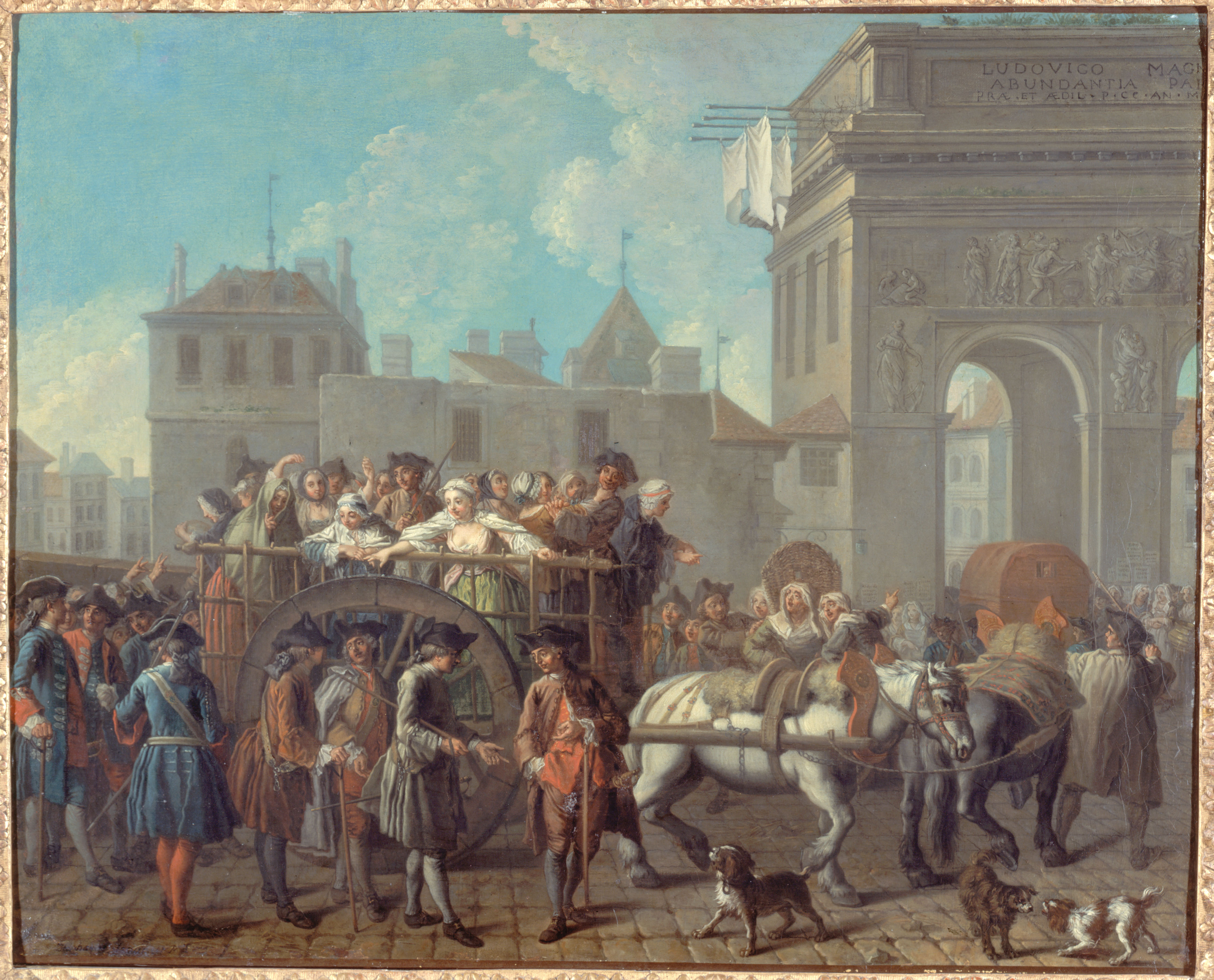
Étienne Jeaurat (1699–1789). "Filles de joie" being taken to the Salpêtrière 1745. Oil on canvas, Musée Carnavalet, Paris

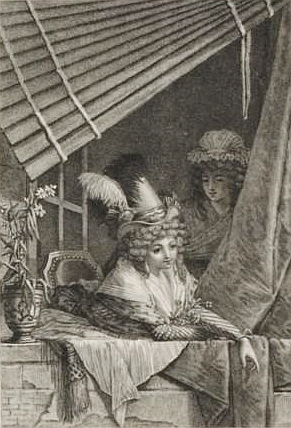
Prostitutes in Paris during the revolutionary period, c. 1793–95. Engraving by Jacques-Louis Copia (1764–1799), after Jean-Baptiste Mallet (1759–1835). Bibliothèque nationale de France

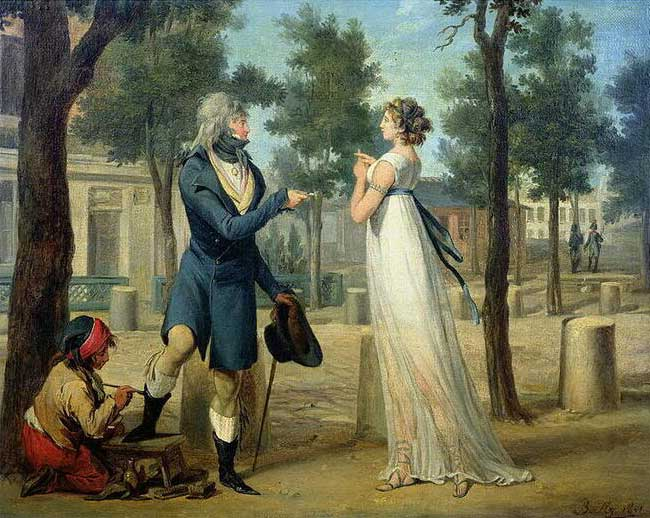
Louis-Léopold Boilly (1761–1845). "Point de Convention" c. 1797 (Woman refusing money offered by a gentleman who has assumed she is a prostitute)

The history of prostitution in France is similar to that in other European countries, with alternating periods of tolerance and repression (Tolérance générale, répression occasionnelle), but is marked by the length of time during which the maisons (brothels) were tolerated. Prostitutes were not marginalized, but integrated into society where they had a role to play. In stories (which were often ribald), prostitutes would be complicit with other women in avenging men. The great Cathedral of Chartres had a window endowed by prostitutes (The Prodigal Son) in the same way as other windows were endowed by various other trade guilds (The Trade Windows).

=== Early period ===
After the period of Roman rule, the Visigoth monarch Alaric II (485–507 AD) seems to be the first French ruler to prosecute prostitution.

=== Middle Ages ===
During the Middle Ages, the various authorities, civil or noble, oversaw prostitution as an institution. Regulation was largely at the municipal level, restricting activity on certain streets, travel, liaisons, required distinctive dress (gold belts, or ceinture dorée) and opening hours of the maisons (10–6, or 10–8 in Paris).

Charlemagne (768–814 AD) was amongst those rulers who attempted to suppress prostitution, declaring flogging (300 lashes) as a punishment in his capitularies. This was primarily aimed at the common man, since harems and concubines were common amongst the ruling classes. Some idea of the seriousness with which the state regarded the offense is provided by the fact that 300 lashes was the severest sentence prescribed by the Code Alaric. Offenders also had their hair cut off, and in the case of recidivism, could be sold as slaves. There is no evidence that those sentences effectively decreased prostitution. Under Philip II (1180–1223) an irregular militia, the Ribauds were created in 1189 to police prostitution and gambling, headed by a Roi des Ribauds, but abolished by Philip IV (1285–1314) due to their licentiousness.

==== Saint Louis IX (1226–1270) ====
In the interim, Louis IX (1226–1270) attempted to ban prostitution in December 1254, with disastrous social consequences and widespread protests. The decree ordered the expulsion of all "women of evil life" from the kingdom and confiscation of their belongings, but simply drove the trade underground. Eventually he was forced to revoke this by 1256. Although still railing against women who were "free with their bodies and other common harlots", he acknowledged the pragmatic desirability of housing them away from respectable streets and religious establishments, and so obliged them to reside outside of the borders of the city walls. His resolve to do away with prostitution was affirmed in a letter of 1269 to the regents, as he set out on the Eighth Crusade, in which he refers to the need to extirpate the evil, root and branch. The punishment for infraction was an 8 sous fine and risking imprisonment in the Châtelet (see below). He designated nine streets in which prostitution would be allowed in Paris, three of them being in the sarcastically named Beaubourg quartier (Beautiful Neighbourhood) (Rue de la Huchette, Rue Froimon, Rue du Renard-Saint-Merri, Rue Taille pain, Rue Brisemiches, Rue Champ-Fleury, Rue Trace-putain, Rue Gratte-cul, and the Rue Tire-Putain) (see below)

Today, this area corresponds to the 1st–4th arrondissements clustered on the Rive Droite (right bank) of the Seine (see map). These streets, associated with prostitution, had very evocative if indelicate names including the Rue du Poil-au-con (or hair of the con, from the Latin cunnus meaning female genitalia, hence Street of the Pubic Hair, or Poil du pubis), later altered to the Rue du Pélican, in the 1st arrondissement, near the first Porte Saint-Honoré, and the Rue Tire-Vit (Pull-Cock, i.e. penis, later the Rue Tire-Boudin, Pull-Sausage) now Rue Marie-Stuart, in the 2nd arrondissement, near the first Porte Saint-Denis. It is said that Tire-Boudin was a euphemism invented for Mary Queen of Scots when she asked after its name, and the street is now named after her. The nearby Rue Gratte-Cul (Scratch-bottom) is now the Rue Dussoubs, and the Rue Pute-y-Musse (Whore [who] hides there) the Rue du Petit-Musc by corruption. The "rue Trousse-Nonnain" (fuck nun), later became Trace-Putain, Tasse-Nonnain, and Transnonain; then in 1851 it was amalgamated into the Rue Beaubourg. The Rue Baille-Hoë (Give Joy) is now Rue Taillepain in the 4th arondissement near the Porte Saint-Merri.

In 1358, the Grand Conseil of John II (1350–1364) echoing the "necessary evil" doctrine of Saints Augustine (354–430 AD) and Thomas Aquinas (1225–1274) declared that "les pécheresses sont absolument nécessaires à la Terre" (Sinners are an absolute necessity for the country). Prostitution remained confined to designated areas, as indicated in this decree in the reign of Charles V (1364–1380), by Hugh Aubriot, Provost of Paris in 1367, outlining the areas outside of which prostitutes would be punished 'according to the ordinance of Saint Louis';

Que toutes les femmes prostituées, tenant bordel en la ville de Paris, allassent demeurer et tenir leurs bordels en places et lieux publics à ce ordonnés et accoutumés, selon l'ordonnance de Saint Louis. C'est à savoir : à L'Abreuvoir de Mascon (à l'angle du pont Saint-Michel et de la rue de la Huchette), en La Boucherie (voisine de la rue de la Huchette), rue Froidmentel, près du clos Brunel (à l'est du Collège de France aboutissant au carrefour du Puits-Certain), en Glatigny (rue nommée Val d'Amour dans la Cité), en la Court-Robert de Pris (rue du Renard-Saint-Merri), en Baille-Hoë (près de l'église Saint-Merri et communiquant avec la rue Taille-Pain et à la rue Brise-Miche), en Tyron (rue entre la rue Saint-Antoine et du roi de Sicile), en la rue Chapon (aboutissant rue du Temple) et en Champ-Flory (rue Champ-Fleury, près du Louvre). Si les femmes publiques, d'écris ensuite cette ordonnance, se permettent d'habiter des rues ou quartiers autres que ceux ci-dessus désignés, elles seront emprisonnées au Châtelet puis bannies de Paris. Et les sergents, pour salaire, prendront sur leurs biens huit sous parisis…

Contemporary accounts suggest that this decree was rarely enforced.

The appearance of syphilis at the end of the 15th century had stigmatized these houses by the end of the 16th century, but their continued existence was confirmed by King Henry IV (1589–1610).

=== Réglementation (Regulation) ===
In 1804 Napoleon ordered the registration and bi-weekly health inspection of all prostitutes, the so called Regulation System. State controlled legal brothels (then known as "maisons de tolérance" or "maisons closes") started to appear in Paris and in other cities and became highly popular throughout the century. By 1810, Paris alone had 180 officially approved brothels.

By law, they had to be run by a woman (typically a former prostitute) and their external appearance had to be discreet. Prostitutes working in the maisons, or any woman arrested twice for soliciting had to be registered as such. Registration involved having their name on a national register, and agreeing to abide by the regulations and twice weekly medical examinations. This pattern of regulation rapidly spread throughout Europe, partly aided by the Napoleonic occupations.

Among the most expensive and best known maisons de tolérance in Paris were:

- le Chabanais (opened 1878 and favored by Prince Edward, who had himself made a special "love seat" there),
- le Sphinx,
- la Rue des Moulins,
- le One-Two-Two (opened in the mid-1920s and soon became the top address)
- Hotel Marigny was the best known brothel for male homosexual clients; it opened in 1917 near Opera in the second arrondissement

More sordid brothels, the maisons d'abattage, offering quick and dirty "services", were popular amongst the lower-class.

During the 19th century, Paris was home to several wealthy courtesans, among whom La Païva was perhaps the most prominent.

==== World War I ====
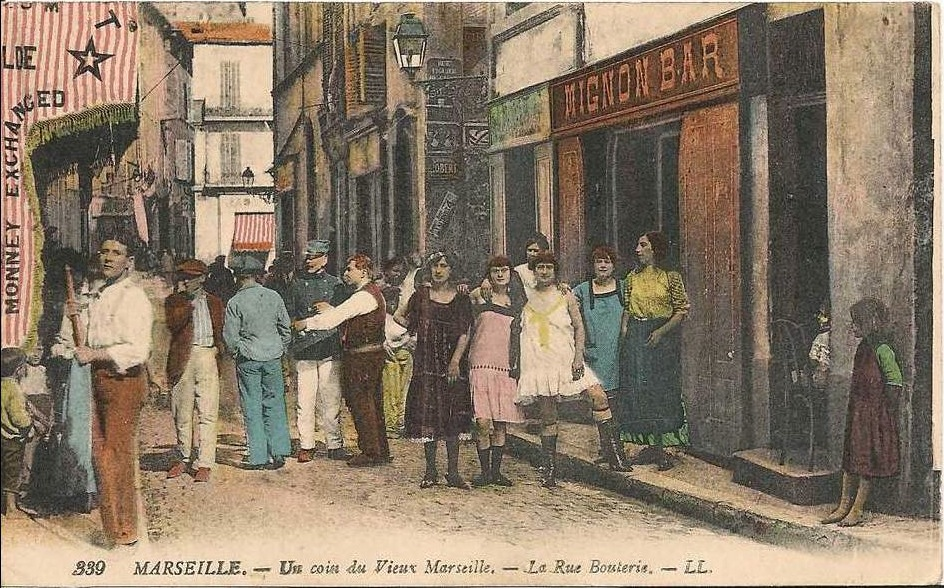
A group of filles de joie in Marseille, 1919

During World War I, in Paris alone, US Army officials estimated that there were 40 major brothels, 5,000 professionally licensed streetwalkers, and another 70,000 unlicensed prostitutes. By 1917, there were at least 137 such establishments across 35 towns on or close to the Western front.

The British Army adopted local codes of ethics when fighting in another country, and so allowed troops on rest periods and days off to visit what became termed maisons tolérées. Such activity was not just tolerated but encouraged for both the young, as well as the married men who were missing their wives. As the war advanced, so did the need and rank of the prostitutes entertained. While British troops paid just six pence per day were often found in the lowest priced institutes, dominion soldiers from Australia, New Zealand, and Canada received six shillings and could afford higher-class "services". British officers preferred to "always indulge with armour (condoms)" and took to patronizing German Army officers' former prostitutes when the lines of conflict were advancing towards the end of the war, with the advantage that they sometimes gained tactical and strategic information as well.

It is unknown how many or what percentage of men visited the institutions, but the French army recorded over a million cases of gonorrhea and syphilis during the war. In 1915, in Le Havre, a survey undertaken by the Royal Army Medical Corps counted 171,000 uniformed British Army visitors to the brothels in just one street. As a result, rates of venereal disease began to climb, with 23,000 British Army men at any time on average during the second half of the campaign hospitalized for treatment, with over 150,000 British soldiers having been infected by the end of the war. The disease at the time had a high social stigma, but a particularly bad infection could get a soldier medically discharged from frontline duty, even on a temporary basis. Syphilis was treated with injections of mercury, administered at a hospital over a 30-day period, thereby guaranteeing escape from the frontline. The result was that some prostitutes with particularly bad VD infections could charge more. Every British army unit had a sexually transmitted disease clinic, where soldiers could gain an ointment consisting of mercury and chlorine to prevent VD infection, or receive a urethral irrigation with potassium permanganate after STI exposure.

The US Army attitude was different, driven by a reformist attitude at home. In October 1917, Secretary of War Newton D. Baker said:

These boys are going to France. I want them adequately armed and clothed by their government; but I want them to have an invisible armor to take with them . . . a moral and intellectual armor for their protection overseas.

Aided by the American Social Hygiene Organization, he closed so called segregated zones close to Army training camps, which included closing the notorious Storyville district in New Orleans. When the two million soldiers of the American Expeditionary Force had been deployed to France, they were guided by a bulletin from AEF commander Gen. John Pershing to just say no:

Sexual continence is the plain duty of members of the AEF, both for the vigorous conduct of the war, and for the clean health of the American people after the war.

This was backed up by additional posters and pamphlets that read "You wouldn't use another fellow's tooth-brush, so why use his whore?" and "A Soldier Who Gets a Dose Is a Traitor!" The US Army had clear instructions on those who did not follow the no indulgence rule. US Army regulations required soldiers who admitted to having sex while on leave to submit to chemical prophylaxis, that included irrigating the penis. Soldiers who did not report for prophylaxis and later contracted VD were subject to court-martial and possibly a hard-labor sentence, while those who contracted disease after treatment only lost pay during treatment. Implemented from the first day of training, the initiative was so successful that US Army doctors reported that 96% of the cases they treated had been contracted while the soldier was still a civilian.

However, on debarkation at the designated port of St. Nazaire, a dispute with French authorities broke out, after the AEF placed the Maisons Tolérée off limits. With the dispute escalating, President Georges Clemenceau sent a memo to Gen. Pershing offering a compromise: American medical authorities would control designated brothels operated solely for American soldiers. Pershing passed the proposal to Raymond Fosdick, who gave it to Secretary Baker. Upon receiving it, Baker responded: "For God's sake, Raymond, don't show this to the president or he'll stop the war." The French later proposed a deal that targeted the Black American troops, most of whom were assigned to unloading freight in segregated stevedore battalions, again flatly turned down by US authorities. But this merely highlighted US differential racial policy, as all black troops were required by US Army regulations to undertake prophylaxis when returning from leave, whether or not they acknowledged sexual contact.

The policy adopted by the US Army worked, with far lower rates of VD across their troops compared to French or British and Dominion combatants. However, after the signing of the Armistice, when the US Army could no longer plead military necessity as grounds for curtailing leave, VD rates among US Army troops shot up.

==== World War II ====
During World War II, Dr Edith Sumerskill raised the issue of Maisons Tolérées in Parliament to Secretary of State for War Anthony Eden after the intervention of the British Expeditionary Force. Further questions were raised in Parliament after the D-Day invasion, to ensure such local practises and medical precautions were continued.

During the German occupation of France, twenty top Paris maisons, including le Chabanais, le Sphinx and le One-Two-Two, were reserved by the Wehrmacht for German officers and collaborating Frenchmen. The brothels flourished during this time, and Hermann Göring visited Le Chabanais, as is related in the 2009 two-volume book 1940–1945 Années Erotiques by Patrick Buisson.

=== Abolitionism in France ===
==== Loi de Marthe Richard (1946) ====
After the war, Marthe Richard, a town councillor in Paris and former street prostitute, successfully campaigned for the closure of all "maisons". On 13 April 1946, the "loi de Marthe Richard" was passed with votes of the Christian-Democratic Party (MRP) and the Communist Party (PCF). The latter considered brothels to be "bourgeois". As a result, the legal brothels were closed. (This serves as a plot point in the first James Bond novel, Casino Royale.) However, prostitution remained a legal activity, with only its organization and "exploitation" (pimping) forbidden.

This ended a system in existence since 1804, which effectively made prostitutes less visible without suppressing the trade, and thus preservied "public morality". Prostitute registries were supposed to be destroyed, but police kept files till 1960. Roughly 20,000 women were affected by this law, and approximately 1,400 houses were closed. Many former brothel owners soon opened "hôtels de passe" instead, where prostitutes could keep on working, but the visibility of their activities was reduced.

Critics of French prostitution policy, such as Mouvement du Nid, question how effective this was, its implementation, and whether it really closed the "maisons". For instance, they point to the presence of military brothels in Algeria till 1960.

In 1958, the Office central pour la répression de la traite des êtres humains (OCRTEH) was created as a branch of the police, to combat pimping and cooperate with Interpol. It is under the direction of the Minister of the Interior.

==== 1960: Ratification of 1949 UN Convention ====
France became officially "abolitionist" in 1960 when it ratified the 1949 UN Convention on the Suppression of Trafficking and the Exploitation of Prostitution.

==== State policy from 1960 ====
In the debates over prostitution in France, "abolition" was used to refer to both the abolition of laws and regulations that make any distinction between someone involved in prostitution and the general population, and the abolition of prostitution itself. At that time, police files on prostitutes were finally destroyed. However, implementation varied considerably locally, although prostitution was rarely on the political agenda over the next 30 years. Exceptions were the demonstrations of prostitutes rights movements against police harassment in 1975, and periodic calls by individual politicians for re-opening the "maisons" (see Maisons closes below). These included that of Michèle Barzach (RPR), a former Minister of health (1986–1988) in 1990, as a public health measure, given the concerns about HIV/AIDS.

State policy has been built on two principles – criminalization, and support. Criminalization of the exploitation (brothels, procuring, pimping) of prostitution, and support and re-integration for those exiting. However, the latter attracted few funds, and was largely left to charitable NGOs. Only a single position within the Department of Social Services had responsibility for this part of policy and funding. The original intention was that the Departments would set up their own Prevention and Rehabilitation Services, but of 100, only 12 were created following the 1960 ordinance, and by 1999, there were only 5, run by NGOs. Other state responsibilities have fallen to the women's rights administration, and also to health, finance, interior, foreign, and education ministries from time to time.

==== Penal Code 1994 ====
In the new Penal Code, pimping became a serious offence if associated with organized crime or barbarity, and overall was defined at three levels of severity with increasing fines, and prison sentences from five years up to life imprisonment. Clients were only criminalized if purchasing from minors under 15 years of age.

In 1998, sex tourism was added if offences against minors were committed by French residents outside France.

==== International policy ====
In the 1990s, France became increasingly assertive internationally as a champion of abolitionism, opposing moves towards liberalization and regulation by the Netherlands and the International Labour Organization. France also opposed the distinction between 'free' and 'forced' prostitution in international discussions. Hubert Védrine the foreign minister asserted France's position at various international venues, such as the protocol to the Convention on the Rights of the Child on the sale and prostitution of children and child pornography (2000) and the Convention on organized crime with the protocol on trafficking (Palermo 2000). French policy emphasised, along with the International Convention, that the real evil was prostitution, not trafficking, defined as an "accompanying evil". At the same time, Nicole Péry, minister for women's rights (Secrétaire d'État aux droits des femmes; 1998–2002), included prostitution in her department's campaign on violence against women, calling it a form of violence at Beijing+5, (New York 2000).

==== Loi Sarkozy (Loi pour la sécurité intérieure) 2003 ====
Active solicitation was also outlawed in the late 1940s. Passive solicitation (being present with revealing clothes at locations known for prostitution) was outlawed in 2003 as part of a package of law-and-order measures by then-interior minister, Nicolas Sarkozy, in his "Domestic Security Bill" (loi pour la sécurité intérieure 2003, or LSI also known as Loi Sarkozy II), and had the effect of reducing the visibility of prostitution on the streets. Prostitutes' organizations decried the measure, which came into force in March 2003, calling it punitive and fated to increase the power of pimps. Many prostitutes started to work out of vans, a strategy authorities attempted to combat by using parking regulation enforcement. The law has been abrogated in 2016 (see below).

==== Law 444 (2016) ====
Law number 2016-444 "visant à renforcer la lutte contre le système prostitutionnel et à accompagner les personnes prostituées" (Eng.: "to strengthen the fight against the prostitution system and to support prostituted persons") was enacted on 6 April 2016, with effect from 13 April 2016.

The most publicised provision of this law is that the buying of sexual acts was made illegal and punishable with a fine of up to €3,750 if the prostitute is an adult. Buying a sexual act from an underage prostitute increases the penalty to three years of jail and fine of €45,000. However, the bulk of this law is concerned with supporting prostitutes exiting the industry and supporting victims of sex trafficking. The law also abrogated the previous law about passive solicitation.

In the first six months after the law was enacted, 249 men were prosecuted for purchasing sexual acts.

== Legal status ==
It is legal for a man or woman to be a prostitute and sell sexual acts. The buying of sexual acts was outlawed in April 2016.

Prostitutes pay taxes as other independent activities.

Owning or operating a brothel is illegal.

All forms of proxénétisme (procuring) are illegal. Proxénétisme is defined as:

- "helping" someone to prostitute themselves
- profiting from the prostitution of another person, or receiving funds from someone who prostitutes themselves habitually (living off the avails)
- hiring or training someone to prostitute themselves, or pressuring someone to prostitute themselves.

== Politics ==
France is an "abolitionist" country – its public policy is the prohibition and eradication of prostitution; however, at the same time, it considers that making it illegal to offer sexual acts in return for goods or services in the context of one's private life is a violation of individual liberty.

The issue has been prominent on the French political agenda since the late 1990s, responding to international pressures on child prostitution and pornography and trafficking, international distinctions between forced and voluntary entry into prostitution (rejected by the dominant "abolitionist" discourse) and increasing migration. This has been accompanied by increasing discourse on la sécurité internally, which has gradually become dominant, affecting the framework in which prostitution is debated. This was heightened in 2002 when Jean-Pierre Raffarin's right-wing government (2002–2005) succeeded the Gauche Plurielle (plural left) coalition of Lionel Jospin (1997–2002). The Jospin construction was that prostitutes were victims and needed to be saved and re-integrated. This was a view shared by state feminists, ministers, delegates, and the powerful abolitionist lobby, and is reflected in the Derycke report as well as the National Commission on Violence Against Women, as well as the debates on modern slavery (esclavage moderne). These consultations in turn enabled agents of the civil society access to the policy process. Very few of these constructed prostitution as a legitimate form of work.

At the municipal level, there was evidence of prostitutes being constructed as public nuisances that needed to be confined, and many mayors of both political groups responded to citizen groups to introduce by-laws restricting prostitutes' activities in early 2002. This was fuelled by an apparent increased visibility. For instance, Françoise de Panafieu (UMP delegate 17th arondissement) campaigned against street prostitution in the summer of 2002. The commitment to abolitionism prevented specific laws aimed at prostitution (which would have been seen as regulation) initially, so they often used traffic and parking by-laws to drive out workers, which ultimately mean that they were moved from well-lit busy areas to much more unsafe areas. As the discourse shifted from abolitionism to security, so did more explicit laws and regulations. This disquiet enabled Nicolas Sarkozy to later mobilize public anxiety about security evident in the elections that year in his Domestic Security bill.

The cultural context is the concept of gender equality as stated in the preamble to the 1946 and 1958 constitution and which had seen an increasing momentum of political gains for women, including the establishment of a women's policy agency in 1974 and a ministry of women's rights in 1981. However, a significant gap still exists in terms of economic and employment opportunities. Meanwhile, immigration policies have become increasingly restrictive, and soliciting can result in the removal of a migrant's work permit.

The 2007 Socialist Party Manifesto calls for holding clients "responsible". The vague language is due to the fact that such measures remain controversial in the Socialist Party. The Manifesto also calls for repealing the ban on "passive solicitation".

In 2010, Chantal Brunel, an MP in Sarkozy's ruling right-wing UMP party, and newly appointed head of the equality office, called for legalizing and regulating maisons closes (brothels), (see Maisons closes, below) akin to the situation in several surrounding countries, claiming that this would make the sex trade safer and transparent. She outlined the strategy in her 2010 book "Pour en finir avec les violences faites aux femmes" (An end to violence against women). This caused considerable discussion. French prostitutes are opposed to this plan to legalize and regulate maisons, arguing that it would limit their options to make their own decisions—dozens of French prostitutes have marched to protest the proposal to legalize brothels. Instead, they demand the repeal of the 2003 law outlawing solication, a demand that Chantal Brunel also supports.

In June 2012, the socialist women's minister Najat Vallaud-Belkacem announced that she wanted to abolish prostitution in France and in Europe.

=== State feminism ===
State feminists dominated the discourse in the left-wing Jospin years, pursuing an anti-male-violence campaign. As Women's Minister, Nicole Péry, confirmed in her New York speech (see above), prostitution, as a form of male violence, was very much part of that State strategy.

This influence has waned under the security agenda of the succeeding right-wing governments, but is still evident in the new political thinking, as stated in Marie-Jo Zimmermann's (UMP) 2002 report to the Delegation on Women's Rights on prostitution in which she echoes the left wing sentiment that the purchase of sex constitutes violence. This thinking was also found in the budget.

== Political and social debates ==
As in many other countries, debates on the nature and regulation of transactional sex are highly polarized. These positions are the familiar ones that define sex work as violence against women on the one hand, and those who see the problem as stigmatisation and poor working conditions on the other. These result in proposals for either the eradication of prostitution, or social reforms. The dominant abolitionist faction consists of Catholics, family values advocates and sections within feminism and the left. As elsewhere, the term abolitionism has seen a shift from the abolition of Réglementation to include abolition of sexual slavery.

From the abolition of Réglementation and the maisons closes (1946) to the late 1990s, there was a broad abolitionist consensus. This resulted from a close fit between the government position and the dominant socio-political discourse, making it acceptable to a broad coalition that included abolitionists, secular and religious NGOs, politicians from both ends of the political spectrum, and most French feminists. This was so dominant under the Jospin years as to appear normative and non-ideological and above any philosophical debate. This provides abolitionists access to both the policy process and to resources, such as the 2000 UNESCO conference (see below), which had high-profile support, including important left-wing figures such as Jean-Pierre Chevènement and Sylviane Agacinski, who was also married to Lionel Jospin.

In the 1990s, a number of changes shifted the focus of debates. These included an increasing globalization of movements on both parts of the debate, Sweden and the Netherlands were moving to change their legislation in two distinct and different directions, there was political instability in Eastern Europe and there was also increasing concern about AIDS, while state feminists were also playing an increasing part in policy debates. There were however occasional dissenting voices such as the debate in Le Nouvel Observateur in 1999, sparked by the Dutch legislation.

=== The 2000 manifestations ===
A manifestation of abolitionism was the declaration of 18 May 2000, published in the centre-left Le Nouvel Observateur, called "Le corps n'est pas une marchandise" ("The body is not a commodity"). This was signed by 35 prominent citizens, and demanded that France and Europe affirm their commitment to the abolition of prostitution, resulting in a debate covering many aspects of the subject, such as choice, autonomy, voice, and agency. Signatories included Francois Hollande, Robert Hue, Dominique Voynet, Isabelle Alonso, Boris Cyrulnik, Françoise Héritier, and Antoinette Fouque. That same week, the Minister of Labour, Martine Aubry, proclaimed in the Assemblée nationale that France would continue to defend its abolitionist position against prostitution, because the commodification of human bodies was not acceptable and a violation of human rights.

UNESCO held a conference in Paris on 16 May of that year (Peuple de l'Abîme. La Prostitution aujourd'hui) organized by Fondation Jean-et-Jeanne-Scelles (Fondation Scelles), an abolitionist NGO, which also published Le livre noir de la prostitution, a strongly worded attack on the subject of prostitution.

In 1999, 189 cases of pimping were tried, and 137 sentenced to prison. Generally the judiciary were satisfied with the existing legislation, although 2000 also saw the creation of a new unit of the Judicial Police using information technology to combat pimping and trafficking. Transnational operators proved a problem to the police.

=== The Senate inquiry (1999–2001) ===
State feminism culminated in the Senate's new Délégation Aux Droits Des Femmes (Delegation for Women's Rights) initiating an inquiry in 1999. The 2001 report of the Delegation (named after its author, Senator Dinah Derycke (1997–2001)) was critical of what it saw as the lack of commitment in the fight against prostitution, mainly the difference between France's official abolitionist position and what was occurring in practice. Although the report received a favourable reception in parliament initially, its political impact was limited. Senator Derycke retired due to ill health and died soon after, while other pressures diverted the debate into other related measures, such as organized crime and trafficking and 'modern slavery'. Outside parliament, there was a new activism and demand for action, led by Bus des femmes. But the focus of the outcry was trafficking, with an emphasis on Eastern Europe. However, the new right-wing government elected in 2002 (Jean-Pierre Raffarin) was to completely change the way prostitution was perceived (see below).

=== Opposition ===
Criticism of the dominant discourse came from prostitutes' rights advocates, health associations, such as Cabiria (Lyons), AIDS groups, and some activists who complained that sex workers were being treated paternalistically and denied voice and moral agency. They demanded eradication of stigma and restoration of rights, access to health and social services, and better "working conditions". Organizations such as Cabiria, ACT-UP Paris, PASTT, and AIDES-Paris Isle-de-France condemned the UNESCO conference (above) as stigmatizing.

All parties claimed they spoke on behalf of and for sex workers, and shared a concern for their welfare, while denying their opponents did. Therefore, both sides held a position that workers should not be penalized, positioned as either victims or legitimate workers.

=== Security debates 2002 ===
New issues arising in 2002 were local residents' complaints and the ascendacy of a law and order discourse on both left and right, leading to a heated debate, notably the suggestion by Françoise de Panafieu (UMP) that the maisons closes (see Maisons closes below) be re-opened. The issue of "security" became a major issue in the presidential and parliamentary elections of 2002. The catch-cry of "to save the Republic" worked in the favour of the right and President Jacques Chirac and Jean-Pierre Raffarin who came to power as Prime Minister that year. Nicolas Sarkozy became minister of the interior in the incoming right-wing Rafferin government (2002–2005), almost immediately announcing a Domestic Security Bill (Loi No 2003-239 pour la sécurité intérieure), and the focus of the debates around prostitution shifted to legislation. (see Public opinion 2002, below)

==== Legislation (Domestic Security Law) 2003 ====
In justifying these measures, Sarkozy claimed large segments of the population were exposed to "anxiety and legitimate exasperation". Article 42 addressed the protection of women in prostitution, considered victims of exploitation, and these were amplified by the Minister for Equality in the Workplace, Nicole Ameline (2002–2004). Sarkozy stated that by criminalizing passive soliciting, he was protecting prostitutes and helping them escape organized crime. The Government position was that action against certain activities would improve the quality of life and sense of security of the poor, who are likely to be victims of crime. Sarkozy stated that the poor supported a tough crime agenda and that the general population wanted a stronger stand on law and order. In particular, he cited an Ipsos poll suggesting that 80% of people on minimum wage approved of his proposals and that the lower the socio-economic class the more support. In February 2002, a poll suggested security was the most important issue on people's minds in an election year, and in October, 70% of the population considered the proposed measures necessary.

The Sarkozy bill both redefined prostitution and transformed policy, making solicitation, previously a minor offence, a serious offence (un délit) (up to six months imprisonment initially, but amended to two), with stiffer fines, and brought back "passive" solicitation as a crime (Article 50). Passive solicitation had been previously decriminalized by another right-wing government, that of Balladur in 1994.

Proposed Article 225-10-1 removed the necessity of the police having evidence of soliciting, allowing 'dress or posture' to be sufficient. He explained that it was inconvenient for the police to have to obtain evidence of active soliciting. In the Senate, a Government amendment subsequently deleted reference to dress after a popular outcry. Article 50 also criminalized purchase of sex from those considered 'particularly vulnerable', such as 'illness, disability, physical or mental deficiency or pregnancy'.

Furthermore, the new legislation allowed for foreigners to have their permits revoked for disturbing public order, allowing deportation to become a penalty for solicitation (active or passive), even if they were legal immigrants. It addressed trafficking, by defining it and attached penalties. In the case of alleged victims of trafficking, collaboration allowed them to stay and work till their case was heard. If an exploiters were convicted (Article 76), they could then receive permanent residence. Finally, article 52 allowed for annual reports to be published on prostitution in France, from 2004 onwards.

==== Reactions ====
Reactions included demonstrations and petitions. Criticism came from the left, trade unions, women's and human rights and poverty groups who saw this bill, which simultaneously addressed begging, squatting and assembling in public areas of buildings, as an attack on the poor, stating that no one chooses to be a beggar or a prostitute. Sarkozy was accused of exploiting people's insecurities. In the Senate, the measures were seen to be street cleaning, rather than addressing the causes of social problems and social exclusion, and that reconstructing prostitution as a law and order issue would merely drive it underground, depriving sex workers from access to services, and damaging AIDS campaigns. it was stated that no-one chooses to be a beggar or a prostitute, to live in neighbourhoods with no facilities and no public services". It was noted that there was no action to deal with organized crime or those who might be exploiting sex workers.

The issue of passive solicitation caused particular concern since it could mean that any woman could be arrested for the way she dressed, and it was particularly hard to define. The judiciary were equally unhappy with evidence that solely consisted of police testimony and were reluctant to convict. It was suggested that concern for victims for trafficking was hardly consistent with punishing them, and that prostitution had become conflated with trafficking. The trafficking policy seemed more aimed at the porousness of borders than at actual criminals, while migrant sex workers appeared to be particularly discriminated against, since they were simultaneously 'rescued' and deported without in any way addressing their vulnerability. Calls for aiming trafficking policy at traffickers rather than sex workers came from the Senate Law Commission, the Delegations for Women's Rights in the Senate and National Assembly, as well as from the opposition.

In the Senate hearings into prostitution that year, Claude Boucher of Bus des Femmes, a sex worker support group, described how sex workers sell sex to survive, unable to make ends meet on social security or the minimum wage. To treat them as criminals, she argued, would just make them more vulnerable. "Cette loi n'est même pas une loi d'ordre moral, c'est une loi contre les exclus, contre les plus vulnérables" (This law is not even a public morals law, it is a law against those who are excluded, against the most vulnerable)

==== Evaluation ====
Sarkozy did not attempt to produce a comprehensive policy on prostitution, but rather a quick fix, addressing immediate concerns of voters in terms of visibility. In this, he succeeded, at least in the short term. The police reported a 40% decrease in prevalence, but also that it had moved to more discreet areas and hours. However, the more profound effect was that Sarkozy had changed the framing of sex workers from victims to criminals, and tied it to immigration debates, focusing narrowly on street transactions. This avoided inconveniencing the middle-class clients, who might have created more opposition. The governmental policy tended to portray all immigrant women in prostitution, the most vulnerable, as victims of trafficking and exploitation, and their pimps as "foreigners".

Following the law coming into effect, 5,619 charges of passive solicitation were laid between March 2003 and July 2004, 90% of these were women, and most from Bulgaria and Albania (40%), Nigeria, Sierra Leone, and Cameroon (35%). 15% were French nationals, another 10% from other areas in Africa and 2% from Asia. There was a notable increase in foreign workers detained and deported. In 2004, the police dismantled many trafficking networks, mainly involving Eastern Europe and Africa. While the law referred to protection, shelter, and re-integration, there was no provision made for this, according to Cimade, an NGO. The results of the law were considered disastrous for the women who were supposed to be protected. The effects were largely those of displacement, pushing their activities into isolated areas, and the 3–7am timeslot, isolated them from service agencies, exposed them to violence and destroyed the historical working relationship with the police. A study by Anne Hidalgo and Christophe Caresche, Deputy mayors in the office of the Mayor of Paris (Bertrand Delanoë), was especially critical:

"En amalgamant prostitution libre et prostitution forcée, qui relèvent de processus totalement différents, en victimisant les personnes qui se prostituent, sans distinction, cette loi légitime et renforce les violences symboliques, physiques, policières, institutionnelles. Elle renforce aussi leur insécurité, les obligeant à investir des lieux éloignés des regards, d'autant plus qu'elle les contraint à travailler davantage puisque toutes ont vu leur clientèle se raréfier, et par conséquent leur revenu diminuer de 50% en moyenne"

Sarkozy had made a sharp distinction between the "classic prostitution" of the traditional French Fille de Joie, who he depicted as unproblematic, even a cultural icon (see Culture), and the presence of "ces malheureuses filles étrangères" (these poor foreign girls) on the streets of France, who he depicted as the security threat. By "rescuing" these victims of trafficking and returning them home, he proposed to solve the situation. He argued that the only way to achieve this was to arrest them and then send them back to their families (Si le racolage est reconnu comme un délit, les forces de l'ordre pourront, parce qu'elles auront commis un délit, ramener ces filles chez elles), which he stated to be a humanitarian duty "c'est un devoir, dirai-je, humanitaire que de raccompagner cette personne chez elle" (I will say it is a humanitarian duty to return such a person to their home).

"Far be it for me to suggest punishing these poor girls: The offense that we are creating must come to their aid ... I hope that these women will have a better future than facing degrading encounters night after night"

In drawing this distinction, Sarkozy made frequent reference to the inability to speak French, constructing the issue as a defense of French. He suggested that this made them vulnerable to exploitation, and that the police would take them home. This last point became a target of those who believed they were being sent back to the conditions that made them leave in the first place.

=== Further legislative attempts ===
Changes to trafficking policy in 2003 were more influenced by European and international influence than domestic concerns, but trafficking was finally defined as well as giving victims residence permits in exchange for testimony. Critics doubted the practicality or whether the benefits were equally distributed between the women and the authorities, an expression of the tension between human rights and public security.

In April 2006, Senator Nicole Borvo (PCF) attempted to introduce a private bill to repeal the Sarkozy law, arguing that it had been ineffective, and turned victims into criminals. The framework was very similar to the 2001 Deryck report, depicting prostitution as violence rather than law and order, and seeking punishment of exploiters, but also measures for prevention and support.

==== 2011 Parliamentary Commission ====
In April 2011, a parliamentary commission report ("En finir avec le mythe du plus vieux métier du monde") recommended the adoption of the Swedish approach of criminalizing the purchase of sex. The social affairs minister, Roselyne Bachelot, supported the proposal, stating, "There is no such thing as freely chosen and consenting prostitution. The sale of sexual acts means women's bodies are made available for men, independently of the wishes of those women." Other support came from Mouvement du Nid. The French sex worker movement STRASS has condemned the proposals.

==== Proposals to punish customers of prostitution (2011–2016) ====
In October and November 2013, French lawmakers began debating a proposal to punish customers of prostitution. On 4 December, the National Assembly passed a bill fining customers of prostitutes by 268 votes to 138, with 79 abstaining, which would impose fines of at least €1,500 on clients caught paying for sexual relations. Within the National Assembly, most of those who supported the bill were MPs from the Socialist Party, which dominated the house. The law was passed in the National Assembly on 4 December 2013. The bill caused considerable controversy in France among politicians and intellectuals, some for legalizing prostitution, and others wanting it banned. The bill was opposed by many sex workers, and was rejected by the French Senate in July 2014.

Finally, on 6 April 2016, the French National Assembly voted to fine customers of prostitutes €1,500.

=== Construction of prostitution ===
Critics say most of the frames (nuisance, victim, deviant, security threat) in which sex work is discussed in France are constructed without the input of sex workers who are depicted as voiceless and agencyless. There are exceptions such as the French lesbian feminist Claudie Lesselier.

== Public opinion ==
CSA, a polling organization, has carried out several surveys on prostitution in France. A 2002 telephone survey analyzed French attitudes about prostitution. 64% of respondents said that prostitution was "a degrading practice for the image and the dignity of the woman (or the man)". 66% of those questioned favored the re-opening of the maisons closes (brothels – see Maisons closes, below), 37% wanted the clients to be criminalized, 22% wanted the prostitutes to be criminalized and 33% wanted all forms of prostitution to be illegal. When analyzed and broken down by age and gender, the survey showed that some people gave contradictory answers: For example, some people appeared to favor both the re-opening of the maisons (brothels) and the interdiction of all forms of prostitution (probably believing that both solutions would work, as the survey showed that most people were dissatisfied with the existing legal situation). Older people and men were more accepting of the idea of having legalized brothels. In the 2006 poll, only 14% thought prostitution should be illegal. Poll results reported in 2010 gave 59% in favor of re-opening of the brothels, and 10% opposed. Liberalization is opposed by abolitionist groups such as Mouvement du Nid.

=== Expert opinion ===
In May 2011, the seventh anniversary of the introduction of the LSI, Médecins du Monde released a very critical report on the poor access to healthcare for prostitutes.

== Forms and extent of prostitution ==
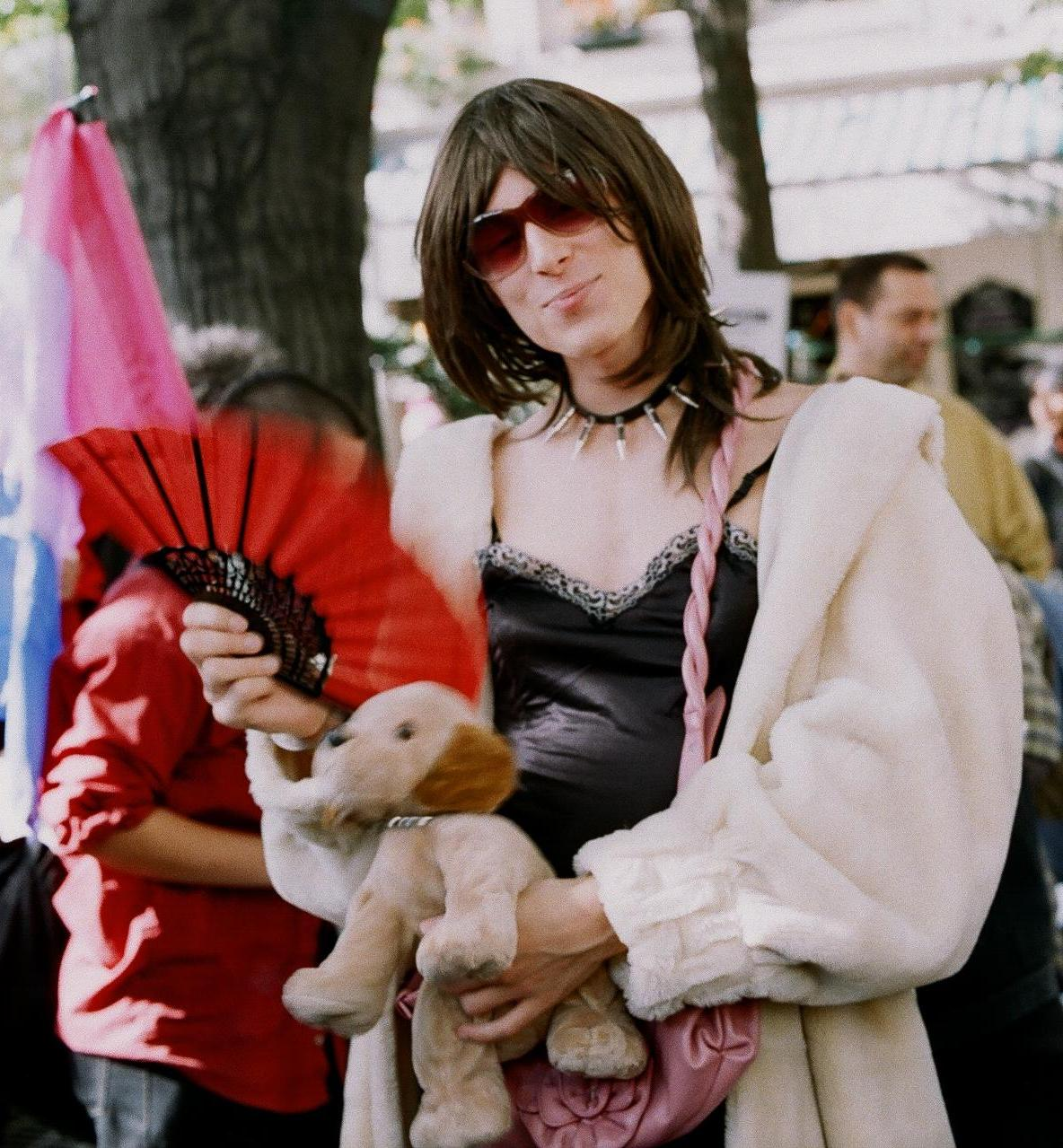
Prostitute activist in Paris, 2005

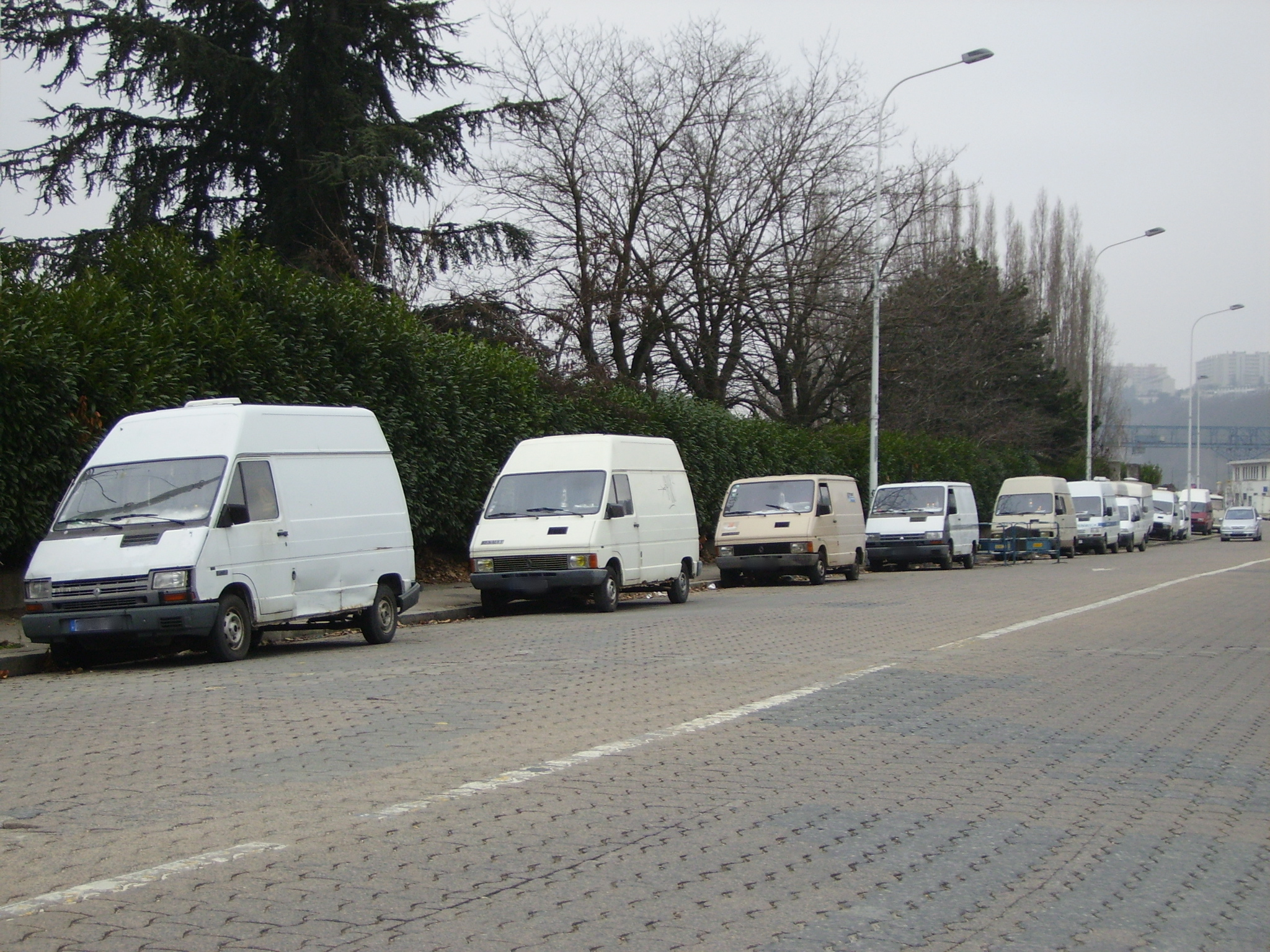
Prostitutes working in vans in Lyon, France

Studies from 2003 estimated that about 15,000 – 20,000 women work as prostitutes in France. In 2010, the number of full-time male and female prostitutes was estimated at 20,000 – 30,000, with 80% being foreigners. In 2018 it was estimated there were 30,000 prostitutes in the country and 90% were foreign.

Sex work in France, like other countries takes many forms. These include street prostitution, escort services, bars, and apartment prostitution. Street prostitution is partly controlled by pimps, while other workers are autonomous prostitutes. In some areas, such as Lyon or the Bois de Boulogne in Paris, sex workers use vans (see illustration). The most famous prostitution street in Paris, the la Rue Saint-Denis, has been somewhat gentrified in recent years and the prostitutes have been moved further north. Escort services where one hires a woman or man for "entertainment" or companionship, but usually including sex, are less common in France, compared to North America. In bars, women try to induce men to buy expensive drinks along with sexual acts. Prices are set by the bar owner, and the money is shared between the owner and the prostitute. Pigalle peepshows are well known for practicing such scams. Prostitution in apartments is advertised in adult newspapers and magazines. Swingers' clubs are places where partner-swapping occurs and sometimes paid prostitutes are in attendance, as well as "amateur" women and couples who get in without paying the flat-rate charge of about 80 to 120 euros that men pay, including food, drink and unlimited sex sessions, with the added twist that these are performed in the open in full view of all the guests.

=== Maisons closes ===
Brothels (Maisons closes) remain illegal, but operate discreetly and clandestinely. Since their official closure in 1946, there have been periodic calls for their re-opening. In 1990, Michèle Barzach (RPR), a former Minister of Health (1986–1988), suggested re-opening them as a public health measure. A row erupted in 2002 with the proposal by Françoise de Panafieu (UMP), which divided French feminists, with Gisèle Halimi denouncing it, but Élisabeth Badinter seeing it as an issue of "the right to dispose freely of one's body".

A 2010 proposal by Chantal Brunel for a return to regulated brothels was opposed by French sex workers (see Politics, above).

Meanwhile, Spain has exploited the difference between the two countries by opening brothels along the French-Spanish border.

=== Earnings ===
In 2004, the average earnings of a French prostitute were estimated at €500 a day. For Sub-Saharian prostitutes living in France, it was less, around €200–300. Some barely made €50–150 a week.

== Prostitution and culture ==
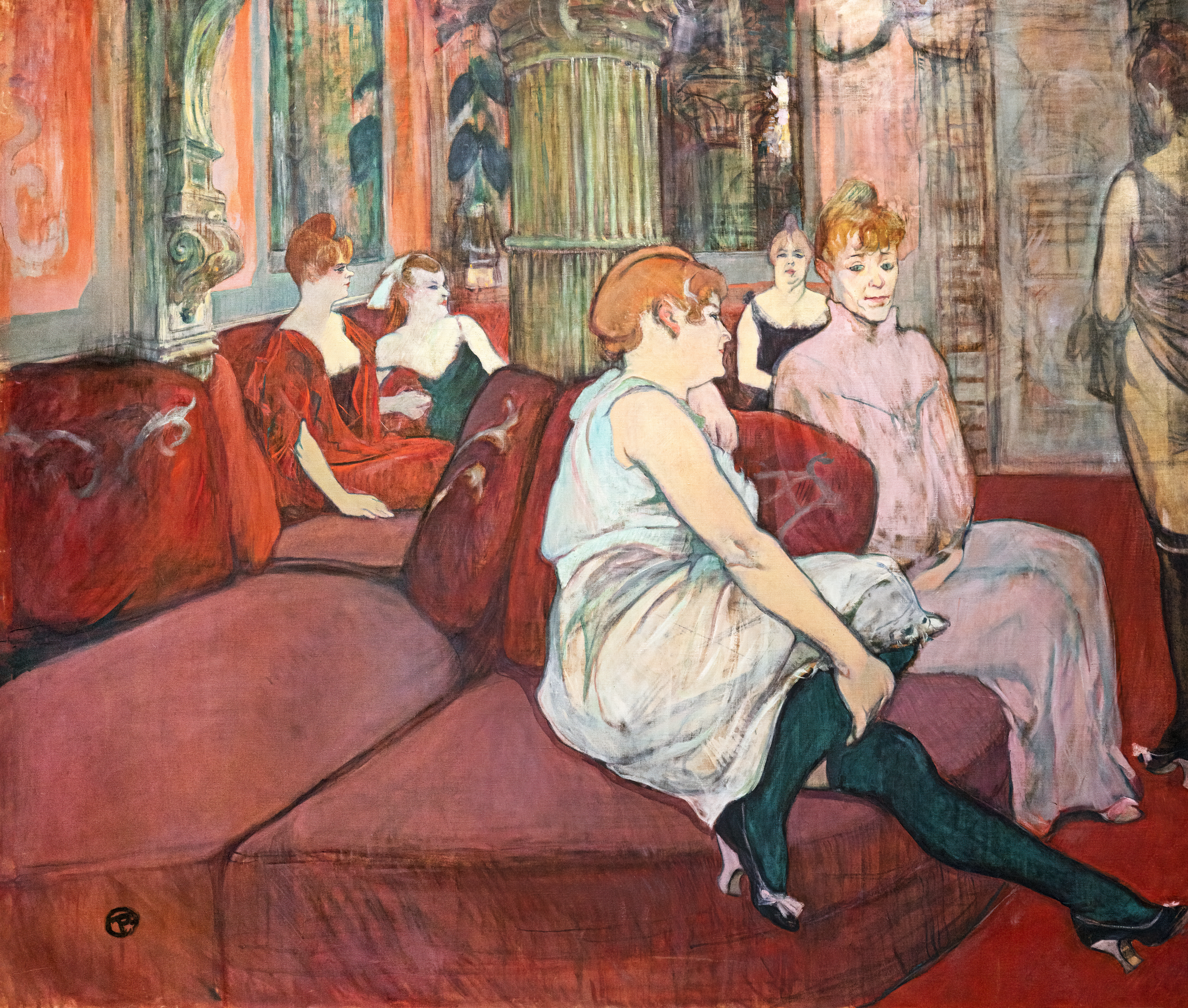
The Salon of the Rue des Moulins, by Henri de Toulouse-Lautrec, 1894

Nicolas Sarkozy recognized that the traditional sex worker was part of France's national cultural heritage. Paintings and drawings of maisons closes (brothels), and prostitution appear frequently in art over the centuries, some of which are shown here. Some of the best known are scenes in brothels produced by Henri de Toulouse-Lautrec, Edgar Degas and Pablo Picasso, among others. Brassaï published photographs of brothels in his 1935 book Voluptés de Paris. A voluminous illustrated work on the phenomenon is Maisons closes. L'histoire, l'art, la littérature, les moeurs by Romi (Robert Miquet), first published in 1952.

Amongst writers depicting the life of women in prostitution in France are Honoré de Balzac and Victor Hugo (see bibliography).

The former Musée de l'Erotisme in Paris devoted one floor to the maisons closes. It exhibits Polissons et galipettes, a collection of short erotic silent movies that were used to entertain brothel visitors, and copies of Le Guide Rose, a contemporary brothel guide that also carried advertising. The 2003 BBC Four documentary Storyville - Paris Brothel describes the maisons closes.

An exhibition about historical Paris brothels took place from November 2009 to January 2010 in an art gallery across the street from the former Le Chabanais.

== Sex trafficking ==
France is a destination, transit, and a limited source country for women and children subjected to sex trafficking. Foreign victims from Eastern Europe, West and North Africa, Asia, and the Caribbean are subjected to sex trafficking. Sex trafficking networks controlled by Nigerians, Bulgarians, Romanians, Chinese, and French citizens force women into prostitution through debt bondage, physical force, and psychological coercion, including the invocation of voodoo and drug addiction. The number of children exploited in commercial sex has increased in recent years. Children, primarily from Romania, West and North Africa, and the Middle East, are victims of sex trafficking in France. The government estimates the majority of the 30,000 people in prostitution in France, about 90 percent of whom are foreign, are likely trafficking victims. Trafficking of male victims for sex trafficking has increased. Nigerian trafficking networks use migrant and drug trafficking routes through Libya and Italy to transport girls to France.

The United States Department of State Office to Monitor and Combat Trafficking in Persons ranks France as a 'Tier 1' country.

== See also ==
- Occupation of Saint-Nizier church by Lyon prostitutes
- Prostitution in Paris
- Prostitution in Overseas France

== Bibliography ==
=== General ===
- French Regulation Laws and the Myth of the Prostitute. Sibyl of Cumae
- Lilian Mathieu. The Emergence and Uncertain Outcomes of Prostitutes' Social Movements. European Journal of Women's Studies February 1, 2003 vol. 10 no. 1 29-50
- Lilian Mathieu. Prostituées et féministes en 1975 et 2002 : l'impossible reconduction d'une alliance. Travail, genre et sociétés 2/2003 (N° 10), p. 31-48.
- Allwood G. Prostitution debates in France. Contemporary Politics 10(2) 145-157, 2004
- Sociétés 2008 n° 99, 2008/1 Prostitution et socialités
- Prostituées. Clio. Femmes, genre, histoire. 2003/1 (n° 17)
- Guillemaut F. et al. État des lieux des actions de prévention VIH auprès des personnes prostituées. Cabiria Dec 2008
- Les Amis du Bus des Femmes. Annual Reports
- Handman, Marie-Élisabeth & Mossuz-Lavau, Janine (eds.) La prostitution à Paris. Paris, La Martinière, 2005
- Marie-Victoire Louis Personal web site: Articles on prostitution Anthology of prostitution literature
- Dossier: Quelles réponses politiques aux problèmes de la prostitution ? March 12 2003

=== Feminism ===
- Claudie Lesselier: Féminisme et prostitution : les contreverses. Nouveau millénaire, Défis libertaires, 2001
- Claudie Lesselier: Combattre le système prostitutionnel. Prochoix March 2001

=== History ===
- Mouvement du Nid: Dates clés en France (key dates in French prostitution)
- Corbin A. Women for Hire: Prostitution and Sexuality in France after 1850. Harvard 1996
- Bernheimer C. Figures of Ill Repute: Representing Prostitution in Nineteenth-Century France. Duke University Press 1997Excerpts
- William Acton: Prostitution in France 1857
- Courtesans: Prostitution in the time of Les Miserables. Mount Holyoke Dept. History
- Leah Lydia Otis. Prostitution in Medieval Society: The History of an Urban Institution in Languedoc. University of Chicago Press, 2009 ISBN 0226640345
- Érica-Marie Benabou: La prostitution et la police des mœurs au XVIIIe siècle, Paris 1987.
- Malte König: Der Staat als Zuhälter. Die Abschaffung der reglementierten Prostitution in Deutschland, Frankreich und Italien im 20. Jahrhundert, Berlin 2016 (Download on perspectivia.net).
- Julia Brüggemann: Review of The State as a Pimp: The Abolition of Regulated Prostitution in Germany, France, and Italy in the 20th Century, in: H-France Review, Vol. 17 (July 2017), No. 121.
- Alain Corbin: Les filles de noce. Misère sexuelle et prostitution au XIXe siècle, Paris 2010 (1978).
- Alain Corbin: Women for Hire. Prostitution and Sexuality in France after 1850, Cambridge 1990.
- Jill Harsin: Policing Prostitution in Nineteenth Century Paris, Princeton 1985.
- Jacques Rossiaud: La prostitution médiévale, Paris 1990.
