= German Historical Institute London =

Academic research institute

Coordinates: 51.51879°N 0.12404°W

- Deutsches Historisches Institut London
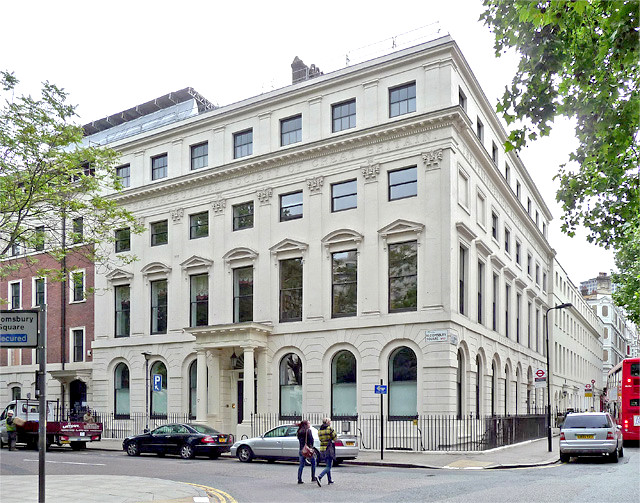
- Abbreviation: GHIL
- Established: 4 November 1976; 49 years ago
- Founder: Carl Haase
- Type: German Historical Institute
- Headquarters: 17 Bloomsbury Square
- Location: Bloomsbury
- Region served: United Kingdom
- Official languages: English; German
- Director: Christina von Hodenberg
- Deputy director: Michael Schaich
- Senior Fellow: Markus Mößlang
- Senior Fellow: Indra Sengupta
- Board of directors: Paul Betts; Jörn Leonhard; Heike Liebau; Rebekka von Mallinckrodt; Gisela Mettele; David Motadel; Jörg Peltzer; Ulinka Rublack; Silke Schwandt
- Publication: GHIL Bulletin
- Parent organisation: Max Weber Foundation
- Website: ghil.ac.uk

The German Historical Institute London (GHIL) is one of the nine independent academic research institutes of the German Historical Institute (German: Deutsche Historische Institute) that are part of the Max Weber Foundation.

== Foundation ==
The creation of the institute was the idea of the German archivist Carl Haase in 1968. A German-British Historical Association was founded in 1969 and, after gaining funding by the German government in 1975, the GHIL officially opened on 4 November 1976.

== Activities ==
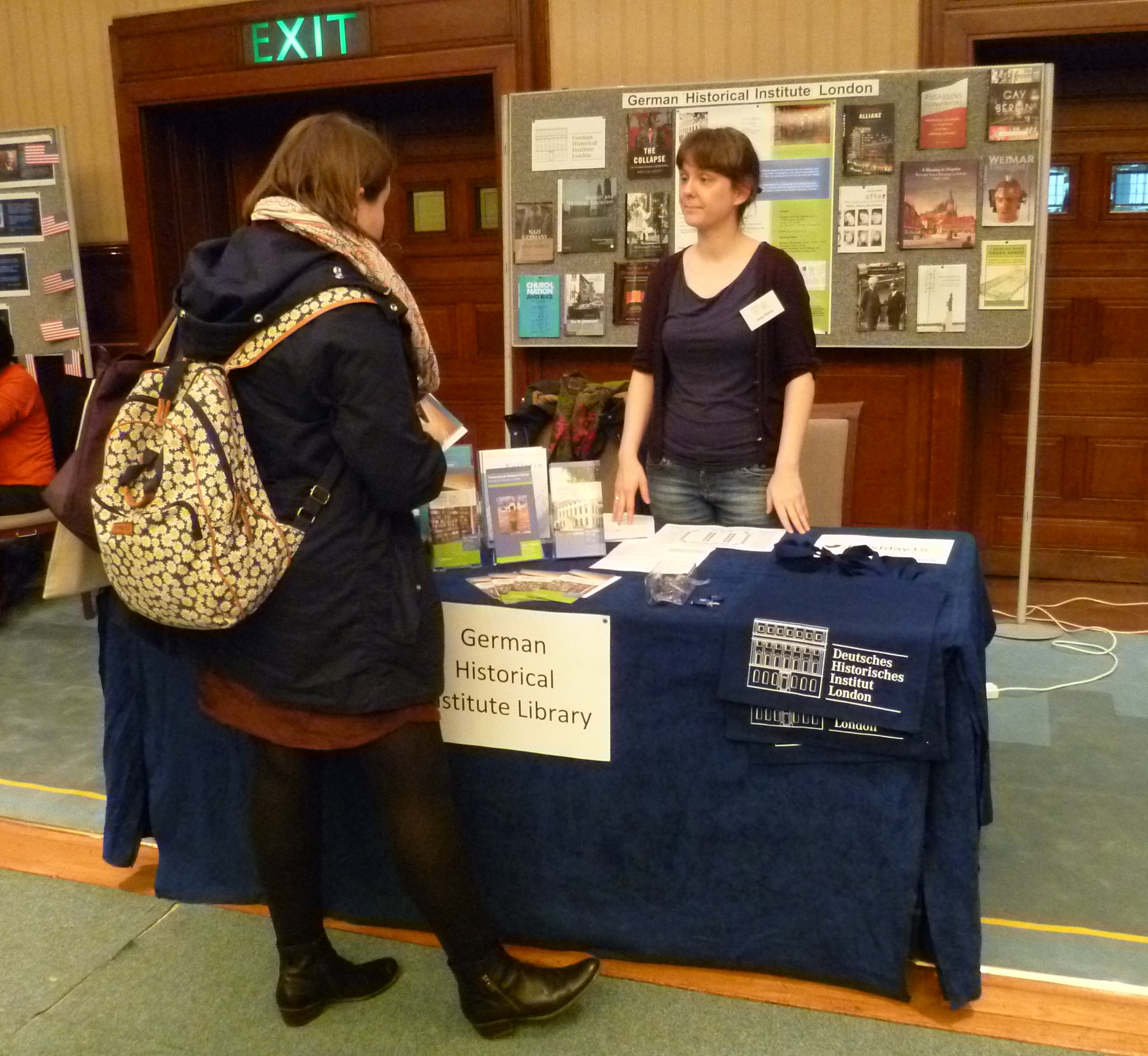
The GHIL at the School of Advanced Study's History Day, November 2015

The GHIL promotes research on "medieval and modern history, in particular on the comparative history of Britain and Germany, on the British Empire and the Commonwealth, and on Anglo-German relations."

It is located at 17 Bloomsbury Square and includes a public library specialising in German history.

== Directors ==
The directors of the GHIL have been:

- Paul Kluke August 1975 - July 1977
- Wolfgang Mommsen August 1977 - July 1985
- Adolf M. Birke August 1985 - August 1994
- Peter Wende September 1994 - August 2000
- Hagen Schulze September 2000 - August 2006
- Andreas Gestrich - September 2006 to August 2018
- Christina von Hodenberg - September 2018 to date

== See also ==
- Germany–United Kingdom relations
- German Association for British Studies..
- German History Society
