= Yazıcı Murtaza =

- A folio from Murtaza's Seyahatnâme showing the section from Beypazarı to Geyve.
- Born: 28 March 1674; Gesi, Kayseri, Ottoman Empire
- Died: After 1743, 1773–1774? Gesi, Kayseri, Ottoman Empire
- Occupations: Traveler, scribe, poet
- Years active: 1696–1715
- Era: 18th-century Ottoman Empire
- Notable work: Seyahatnâme and Eş'âr

NOTE: Content in the edit of 12:03, September 7, 2023 was translated from the existing Turkish Wikipedia article at tr:Yazıcı Murtaza; see its history for attribution.

Yazıcı Murtaza (28 March 1674–after 1743, 1773–1774?) was an 18th-century Ottoman peasant traveler, clerk, and bard. Leaving his native village in his youth, he joined the lower ranks of the Ottoman bureaucracy, serving as a scribe under various provincial governors (beylerbeyis). His tasks took him on extensive travels across the Balkans and Mesopotamia over the course of a decade. He documented his experiences in two different manuscripts, one in prose and one in verse. His records represent the perspective of a provincial Ottoman individual observing the empire's diverse cities and cultural landscapes.

During his travels in Rumelia, Murtaza reached the banks of the Danube and Ottoman Albania, alongside exploring vast regions of Anatolia. Assigned to an Ottoman military campaign sent to suppress a local rebellion along the Tigris River, he traveled down to Basra, where he resided for several years. Although his hopes to visit Mughal India and perform the Hajj were never realized, he eventually returned to his home village, where he spent his remaining years working as a farmer, hodja, muezzin, and vineyard manager.

== Bibliography ==
- Aksu, Batuhan (2025). Clerk of Kayseri: Nature, Society, and Empire in the Manuscripts of Yazıcı Murtaza. Master's Thesis. Istanbul: Boğaziçi University. doi:10.13140/RG.2.2.12747.45600
- Aksu, Batuhan. "Yazıcı Murtaza". Türk Edebiyatı İsimler Sözlüğü (TEİS), Ahmet Yesevi University, 28 Ağustos 2026. Access date: 6 Eylül 2026. ISBN 978-9944-237-86-4.
- Aksu, Batuhan (2025). "Yazıcı Murtaza's Travels - Yazıcı Murtaza'nın Gezileri" (Interactive Map Project). MapHub.
- Demir, Mustafa (2020). Sergüzeşt-i Âşık Yazıcı Murtazâ. Master's Thesis. Çorum: Hitit Üniversitesi.
- Eliaçık, Muhittin (2009). “Bilinmeyen Bir Seyahatnâmede Tüm Yönleriyle İstanbul”. Osmanlı İstanbulu II: II. Uluslararası Osmanlı İstanbulu Sempozyumu. Istanbul: Istanbul 29 Mayıs Üniversitesi Yayınları. 249–265.
- Ertaş, M. Yaşar (ed.) (2020). Arnavutluk'tan Basra'ya: 18. Yüzyılda Kayserili Bir Kâtibin Seyahat Anıları. Istanbul: Kitabevi.
- Ertaş, M. Yaşar (2024). "Bir Benlik İnşası Olarak Kendini Yazmak ve 18. Yüzyılda Sıradan Bir Osmanlı Kâtibinin Benlik Algısı". Osmanlı Araştırmaları. 64: 327-351. doi:10.18589/oa.1597887.
