= Carl Haase =

Carl Haase may refer to:

- Carl Haase (archivist) (1920–1990), German historian and director of the Hanover State Archives
- Carl Friedrich Haase (1788–1865), German obstetrician
