= Albrecht Fuess =

German historian

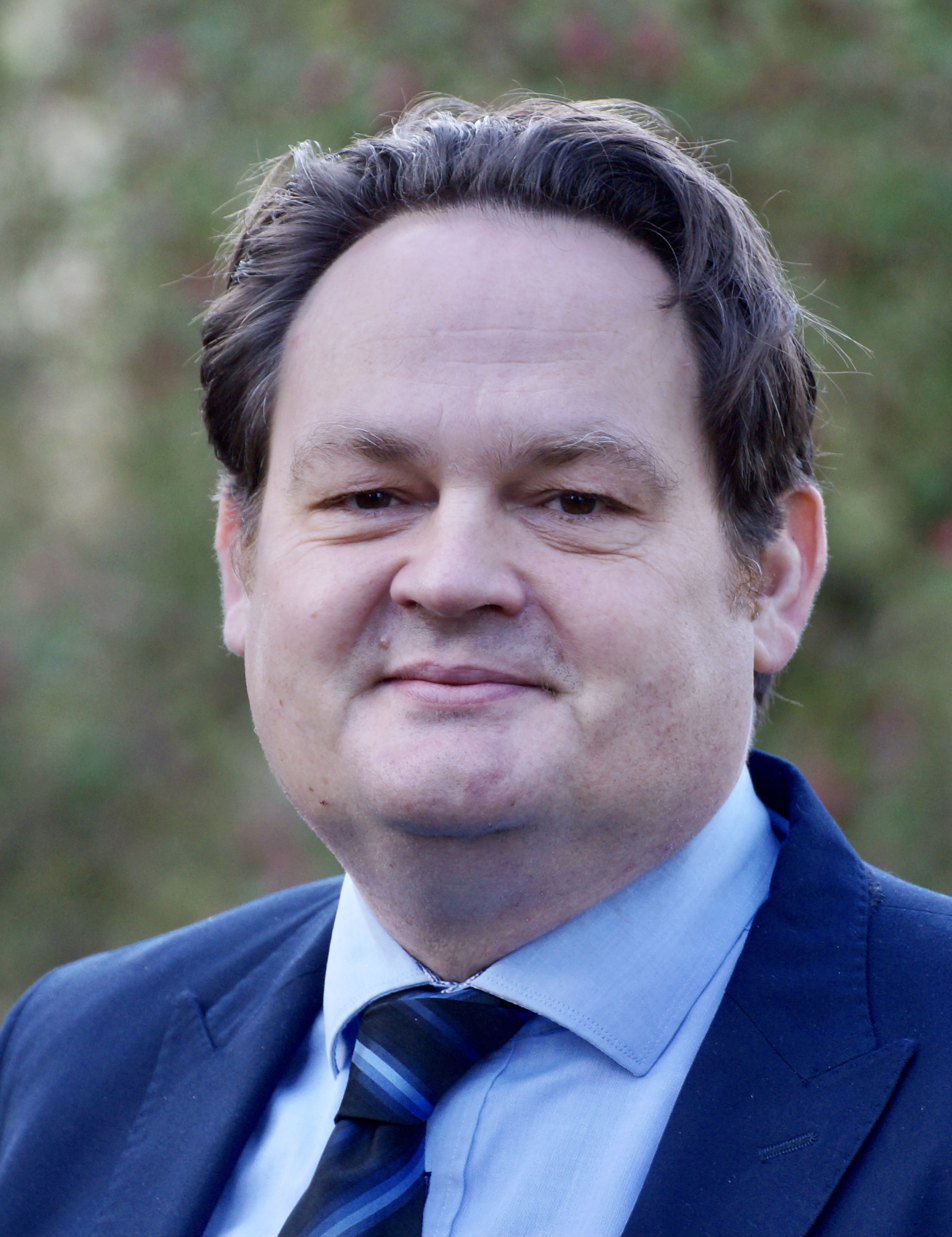
- Born: 1969 (age 56–57); La Tronche, France

Academic background
- Education: University of Cologne (MA, PhD); Cairo University

Academic work
- Discipline: Historian
- Institutions: University of Marburg; Universität Erfurt; University of Tours
- Main interests: Middle Eastern studies, Islamic studies

Albrecht Fuess (1969 in La Tronche) is a German scholar of Islam and the history of the medieval Eastern Mediterranean. He is the professor of Islamic Studies at University of Marburg.

== Education ==
Fuess studied history and Islamic studies at the University of Cologne, where his 1996 master's thesis researched the German community in Egypt between the World Wars. During his graduate work, he also studied at Cairo University. As a scholarship holder of the German National Academic Foundation he completed his doctorate in Cologne in 2000 with a thesis on the Syro-Palestinian coast in the Mamluk period (1250-1517). With the support of his scholarship and during his doctoral studies, Fuess conducted a one-year research stay as visiting scholar at the Orient-Institut Beirut and at the School of Oriental and African Studies in London.

== Career ==
After working as a freelancer in the foreign editorial office of the ZDF in Mainz, he became a research assistant to the chair of Islamic studies at the University of Erfurt in 2002. From 2007 to 2009, he was “Le Studium Fellow” on the Arab and Mediterranean World Team (Equipe Monde Arabe et Méditerranée) of the University of Tours. Here he conducted a research project to compare the systems of the Ottomans, Safavids and Mamluks in the sixteenth century. Since 2010, Prof. Fuess has been the professor of Islamic studies at the University of Marburg. During the autumn and spring of 2019/2020, he was DAAD visiting professor at Ain Shams University in Cairo. He is currently the treasurer of the Medieval Association (in Germany) (German: Mediävistenverband).

== Research Interests ==
His main research interests are the history of the Middle East (thirteenth – eighteenth centuries), the cultural and social history of the Mamluks, Islam in Europe, and contemporary Islamic youth cultures.

== Projects ==
Fuess is also a co-leader for the following international collaborative projects:

- Transottomanica: East European-Ottoman-Persian mobility dynamics. Coordination withStephan Conermann (Bonn) and Stefan Rohdewald (Gießen / Spokesperson) (DFG Priority Program 1981).
- "Mediating Islam in the Digital Age", EU Horizon 2020, Innovative Training Network, German

coordinator, together with colleagues from NISIS (Leiden) / IISMM (Paris) / CISC (Madrid, Barcelona).

- "Land and Landscapes in Mamluk and Ottoman Egypt (13th-18th Centuries)", a.k.a. EGYLandscape Project,

Research Group, ANR-DFG, (with Nicolas Michel (Aix-Marseille Université).

== Bibliography ==
- Fuess, Albrecht; edited with Christoph Werner, Maria Szuppe, and Nicolas Michel (2021). Families, Authority, and the Transmission of Knowledge in the Early Modern Middle East. Tournhout: Brepols. ISBN 978-2-503-59289-3
- Fuess, Albrecht; edited with Stephan Conermann and Stefan Rohdewald (2019). Transottomanica – Osteuropäisch-osmanisch-persische Mobilitätsdynamiken: Perspektiven und Forschungsstand. V&R Unipress. ISBN 978-3-8471-0886-3
- Fuess, Albrecht; edited with Jan-Peter Hartung (2013). Court Cultures in the Muslim World: Seventh to Nineteenth Centuries. London; New York: Routledge. ISBN 978-1-1387-8890-9
- Fuess, Albrecht; edited with Bernard Heyberger (2013). La frontière méditerranéenne du XVe au XVIIe siècle: échanges, circulations et affrontements. Turnhout: Brepols. ISBN 978-2-5035-4815-9
- Fuess, Albrecht (2001). Verbranntes Ufer. Auswirkungen mamlukischer Seepolitik auf Beirut und die syro-palästinensische Küste (1250 - 1517). Leiden: Brill. ISBN 978-9-0041-2108-9
- Fuess, Albrecht (1996). Die deutsche Gemeinde in Ägypten von 1919-1939, Hamburg: Lit-Verlag. (Hamburger Islamwissenschaftliche und Turkologische Arbeiten und Texte 8, hrsg. von Gernot Rotter und Petra Kappert).
