= Hermann Oncken =

German historian

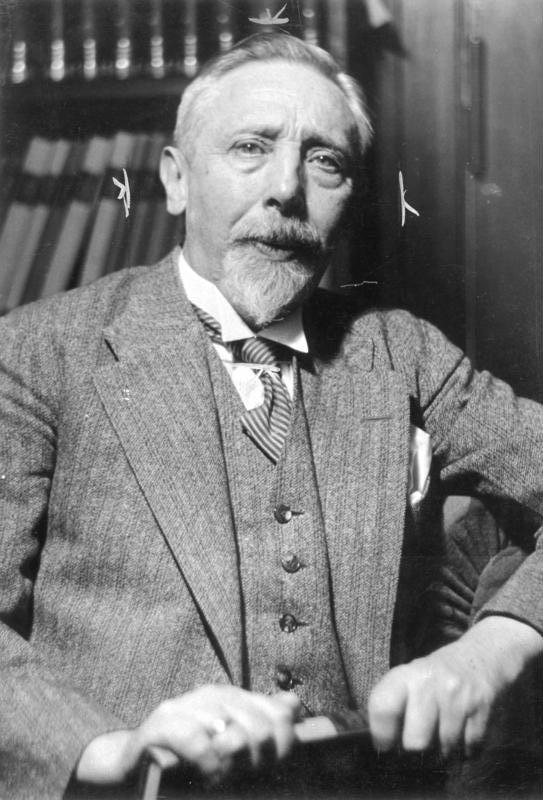
Hermann Oncken

Hermann Gerhardt Karl Oncken (16 November 1869 in Oldenburg – 28 December 1945 in Göttingen) was a German historian and political writer. He was one of the most notable historians of pre-Nazi Germany.

He lectured at the universities of Chicago (1905), Giessen (1906), Heidelberg (1907–1923), Munich (1923–1928), and Berlin (1928–1935). In 1935 he was forced to retire by the Nazi regime, which he opposed.

He specialized in the 19th century, history of historical thought, history of political thought.

Notable students include:

- Franz Schnabel (1887–1966), Ph.D. 1910
- Gerhard Ritter (1888–1967), Ph.D. in 1912
- Ernst Simon (1899–1988), Ph.D. in 1923
- George W. F. Hallgarten (1901–1975), Ph.D. 1925
- Walter Frank (1905–1945), Ph.D. 1927
- Michael Freund (1902–1972), Ph.D. 1928
- Paul Kluke (1908–1990), Ph.D. 1931
- Margret Boveri (1900–1975), Ph.D. 1932
- Felix Hirsch (1902–1982), Ph.D. 1924

== Selected works ==
- Lasalle. Zwischen Marx und Bismarck (Lassalle. Between Marx and Bismarck), 1904
- Rudolf von Bennigsen. Ein deutscher liberaler Politiker (Rudolf von Bennigsen. A German liberal politician), 1910
- Historisch-politische Aufsätze (Historical-political Essays), 1914
- Das alte und das neue Mitteleuropa, 1917
- Die Utopia des Thomas Morus und das Machtproblem in der Staatslehre, 1922
- Die Rheinpolitik Kaiser Napoleons III von 1863 bis 1870 (The Rhine policy of Emperor Napoleon III from 1863 until 1870), 3 vol., 1926
- Napoleon III. und der Rhein. Der Ursprung des Krieges von 1870/71 (Napoleon III. and the Rhine. The Origin of the War of 1870/71), 1926 (= separately published Introduction of Die Rheinpolitik Kaiser Napoleons III (The Rhine policy of Emperor Napoleon III))
- Über das Motiv der "Sicherheit" in der europäischen Geschichte, 1926
- Großherzog Friedrich I. von Baden und die deutsche Politik von 1854–1871 (Grand Duke Friedrich I of Baden and the German policy of 1854–1871, 1927
- Das Deutsche Reich und die Vorgeschichte des Weltkrieges (The German Reich and the Origin of the Great War), 2 vol., 1927
- Cromwell. Vier Essays über die Führung einer Nation, 1935
- Nation und Geschichte. Reden und Aufsätze 1919–1935 (Nation and History. Speeches and Essays 1919–1935), 1935
