= Werner Pascha =

German economist

- Born: 1957 (age 68–69)

Academic background
- Education: Freiburg University; London School of Economics

Werner Pascha (born 1957) is a German economist working on the Japanese and South Korean economies and on the international economic relations of East Asia. He has been influential in introducing an institutional economics and political economy perspective to East Asian studies in the German-speaking area. In addition, he has been very active in academic and semi-official organizations related to East Asia and East Asian studies.

== Career ==
After secondary education in Wuppertal (Abitur at Carl-Fuhlrott-Gymnasium in 1976) he studied economics at the University of Freiburg im Breisgau (Diplom, corresponding M.A., in 1981) and at the London School of Economics. Pascha received a doctoral degree in economics under the supervision of Professor Theodor Dams from the University of Freiburg in 1986, and an advanced doctoral degree (Habilitation) in 1991, in the context of about three years of research at Nagoya University, Japan. He was a full professor of East Asian Economic Studies/Japan and Korea at the University of Duisburg-Essen (UDE, before: University of Duisburg) from 1992 to 2020. Since, he is an Emeritus Professor of UDE and an Associated Member of the Institute of East Asian Studies (IN-EAST) of UDE, which he had co-founded in 1994. He was a visiting professor and researcher at the Institute of Southeast Asian Studies, Singapore, Kyoto University, the Academy of Korean Studies near Seoul, Waseda University, Kobe University, the Korea Institute for International Economic Policy, Doshisha University, and Busan National University.

In 2020, Pascha was honoured with a Festschrift, co-edited by Cornelia Storz and Markus Taube. In 2021, he was awarded the Order of the Rising Sun, Gold Rays with Neck Ribbon, by the Japanese government.

== Contributions ==
In his early academic work, Pascha focused on the dynamics of industrial change in Japan and Pacific Asia, strongly influenced by the concept of the catching-up product cycle as developed by Kaname Akamatsu and others. In his later work, he also got interested in the more conceptional issue of how to understand the evolution of the Japanese and Korean economies as economic systems with inbuilt peculiarities, and to what extent mainstream economics suffices to cover such research issues. Together with the sociologist Karen Shire and the political scientist Paul Kevenhörster he wrote the only textbook in German on Japan´s economy, society and politics (2003, new edition in 2010). In recent years, he got particularly interested in the dynamics of regional and trans-regional economic cooperation schemes and infrastructure initiatives originating in the Indo-Pacific. While a lot of this momentum is often ascribed to China´s Belt and Road Initiative, Pascha pointed out the contribution of Japan in shaping the developments, for instance into the direction of “quality infrastructure”. He has supervised about twenty doctoral dissertations, and several of his former students now hold professorial positions, including Cornelia Storz in Frankfurt, Rüdiger Frank in Vienna, Norifumi Kawai at Sophia University in Tokyo and Sven Horak at St. John´s University in New York. Pascha is listed in WorldCat with 142 works in 349 publications in 3 languages and 4,791 library holdings.

Over the years, Pascha has been very active in governance and advisory functions for various organizations, including the European Association for Japanese Studies, the Institute for Asian Studies (now: GIGA Institute for Asian Studies) in Hamburg, the German Institute for Japanese Studies in Tokyo and the German Association for Asian Studies. For many years, he was a member of the Committee for Economic Systems and Institutional Economics of the German Association for Economics. Since 2015, he is the Vice-President of the Japanese-German Centre Berlin, and since 2013 the Chairman of the Foundation for Japanese-German cultural and academic relations (JaDe Stiftung). Since 2021, he is an Honorary Fellow of EastAsiaNet, a European Research School Network of Contemporary East Asian Studies, of which he had been the permanent member of the steering group since its foundation in 2006. He is the Honorary President of KOPRA, a non-profit platform for internship and job offers with an East Asian focus that he had helped setting up in the early 1990s and supported since.

== Selected publications ==
- Pascha, Werner: Belts, Roads, and Regions: The Dynamics of Chinese and Japanese Infrastructure Connectivity Initiatives and Europe’s Responses, Asian Development Bank Institute (ADBI) Working Paper No. 1114, Tokyo, April 2020
- Bersick, Sebastian and Pascha, Werner (eds.): East Asia and the European Union: Partners in Global Economic Governance, Special Issue, East Asian Community Review, Palgrave, Volume 2, Issue 1-2, June 2019
- Mahlich, Jörg and Werner Pascha (eds.): Korean Science and Technology in an International Perspective, Heidelberg et al.: Physica-Springer, 2012
- Werner Pascha, Cornelia Storz, Markus Taube (eds.): Institutional Variety in East Asia. Formal and informal patterns of coordination, New Horizons in Institutional and Evolutionary Economics series edited by Geoff Hodgson, Cheltenham: Edward Elgar 2011
- Seliger, Bernhard and Pascha, Werner (eds.): Towards a Northeast Asian Security Community: Implications for Korea’s Growth and Economic Development, The Political Economy of the Asia Pacific series edited by Vinod K. Aggarwal, Springer: New York et al. 2011
- Paul Kevenhörster, Werner Pascha and Karen Shire: Japan. Wirtschaft – Gesellschaft - Politik, 2nd updated edition, Wiesbaden: VS Verlag für Sozialwissenschaften 2010
- Pascha, Werner und Cornelia Storz (Hg.): Wirkung und Wandel von Institutionen. Das Beispiel Ostasien, Schriften zu Ordnungsfragen der Wirtschaft Bd. 77, Stuttgart: Lucius+Lucius 2005
- Pascha, Werner (ed.): Systemic Change in the Japanese and German Economies. Convergence and differentiation as a dual challenge, London und New York: RoutledgeCurzon 2004
