= Ursula Ströbele =

German art historian and curator

- Education: Heinrich Heine University Düsseldorf (PhD, Habilitation); University of Wuppertal; Université de Paris
- Occupations: Art historian, curator
- Employer: Braunschweig University of Art
- Known for: Sculpture theory & history; art and ecology; infrastructural studies of art

Ursula Ströbele is a German art historian and curator.

She is currently Professor of Art History with a specialisation in contemporary art at the Braunschweig University of Art (Hochschule für Bildende Künste, HBK Braunschweig).

Her research and teaching addresses the history and theory of sculpture in the 20th and 21st centuries, art and ecology, and infrastructural studies of transport, material flows and production. In 2025, she launched the research project Ecologies of Sculpture in collaboration with the Sprengel Museum in Hanover, funded through the initiative "Potenziale strategisch entfalten" of the Lower Saxony Ministry of Science and Culture and the VolkswagenStiftung.

== Life and Academic education ==
Ursula Ströbele studied art history, information science and economics at Heinrich Heine University Düsseldorf, Bergische University Wuppertal and the Sorbonne in Paris, graduating with a Magister Artium.

Her thesis examined the tomb of Cardinal Richelieu by François Girardon in the Chapelle de la Sorbonne. She completed her PhD at Heinrich Heine University Düsseldorf (HHU) on the sculptural reception pieces (morceaux de réception) of the Académie Royale de Peinture et de Sculpture (1700–1730), and subsequently received her habilitation at HHU on the sculptural aesthetics of the living since the 1960s, with a focus on Hans Haacke and Pierre Huyghe.

From 2009 to 2011, Ströbele served as head of communications and press relations at the studio of artist Anselm Reyle in Berlin. She subsequently held a post-doctoral research position at the Institute for Art History, Art Theory and Aesthetics at the Berlin University of the Arts (UdK) from 2012 to 2018, where she was a co-founder of the DFG-funded research network Theory of Sculpture. From 2019 to 2023, she worked as a research associate at the Zentralinstitut für Kunstgeschichte in Munich, where she led the Study Centre for Modern and Contemporary Art.

In 2019, Ströbele served as artistic director of Kunstverein Arnsberg. Since 2012, she has curated exhibitions at venues including Berlin, Los Angeles, Mönchengladbach, Munich, and Szczecin.

Ströbele has held fellowships from the German Center for Art History (DFK) in Paris, the Evangelisches Studienwerk Villigst, the German Academic Exchange Service (DAAD), Heinrich Heine University Düsseldorf, the Berlin Senate, and the Fritz Thyssen Foundation.
