= Perspectivia.net =

Website

- Perspectivia.net publications page
- Website type: Publication platform
- Available in: German, English, French Italian, Russian, Polish, Arabic and Japanese
- Owner: Max Weber Stiftung – Deutsche Geisteswissenschaftliche Institute im Ausland
- Website: www.perspectivia.net
- Commercial: No
- Registration: Free access to articles and journals, registration for publishers only
- Launched: 2008
- Current status: Open

Perspectivia.net is an international and interdisciplinary online academic publishing platform. The platform publishes articles and reviews in the humanities. Perspectivia.net operates as part of the German Max Weber Foundation – German Humanities Institutes Abroad (Max Weber Stiftung – Deutsche Geisteswissenschaftliche Institute im Ausland), which is financially supported by the German Federal Ministry of Education and Research.

Articles and reviews are primarily submitted throughout the world by the German Historical Institutes and esteemed scholars invited by them. The organization publishes electronic and retro-digitized texts which are then made available to the general public on its website. All material is published according to the open access principle, mostly under a Creative Commons license (CC-BY-NC-ND).

Academic and scholarly articles are published in various languages, including German, English, French, Italian, Polish, and Russian. The website may also be viewed in eight different languages.

Perspectivia.net started as an independent, government-subsidized project in 2007. It officially launched its online publication website in 2008. Since 2018, the publication server is based on MyCoRe.
