= Felix Hirsch =

German journalist

Felix Eduard Hirsch (Berlin, 7 February 1902 – 12 December 1982 Newtown, Pennsylvania) was a journalist for the Berliner Tageblatt and latterly, historian, librarian and professor at Bard College in New York. As a journalist in Berlin, Hirsch was involved in the infamous libel case of Kurt Soelling.

== Biography ==
=== Early life ===
Hirsch studied history at the University of Heidelberg where he graduated under German historian and political journalist, Hermann Oncken in 1924. After university, Hirsch moved to Berlin to pursue a career in journalism at the Berliner Tagelblatt and later became the editor at the Achtuhr Abendblatt. Following the rise of Nazism, Hirsch went into exile in America, and completed a librarian degree at Columbia University in 1936. He subsequently moved to Bard College, where he would teach history and expand the library.

=== Kurt Soelling controversy ===
On 18 May 1932, Judge Kurt Soelling (born Seligsohn), the chairman of the Berlin District Court, brought a libel action against Hirsch for an article he wrote in the Achtuhr Abendblatt that revealed Soelling's Jewish identity. Soelling was born into a Jewish family, but baptised a Protestant in later life. He had been a member of the Social Democratic Party of Germany but in 1931, declared himself a monarchist and became a prominent supporter of the burgeoning Nazi Party and Adolf Hitler. Hirsch's article not only revealed the judge's Jewish identity, but alleged that he had converted to Protestantism to further his judicial career. Hirsch denounced Soelling as a "dishonest politician".

The case concluded on 19 May 1932, with Soelling admitting that he was of Jewish descent, but that he had converted out of conviction. He explained his activities within the Nazi Party as an attempt to understand the organisation, and justified his use of the Nazi salute by the fact that everyone else at the rallies he attended had used it. Hirsch lost the libel case, and was ordered to pay damages of 500 Reichsmark.

According to a dispatch issued by the Jewish Telegraphic Agency regarding the intriguing proceedings:

There was something of a sensation in court when it came out in the course of the proceedings that Judge Soelling is the son of the lay head of the Romberg Jewish Community, and that he had held over his baptism until after the death of a rich uncle who was a strictly observant Jew, so that he should not be cut out of his will, and that he had been baptised only after he had received the legacy.

Justice Soelling was eventually disbarred and forbidden to practice law in Germany as a result of the Nazis' anti-Semitic reforms of 1933.

=== Marriage and children ===
Hirsch married long-term friend, academic Elisabeth Feist in 1938, and they had two children together. Towards the end of his life, he suffered from Parkinson's disease. He died in 1982, at a retirement home in Newtown, Pennsylvania.
