= German Historical Institutes =

Independent academic research institutes of the Max Weber Foundation

The German Historical Institutes (GHI), German: Deutsche Historische Institute, (DHI) are six independent academic research institutes of the Max Weber Foundation dedicated to the study of historical relations between Germany and the host countries in which they are based.

The institutes are:

- German Historical Institute in Rome (established in 1888)
- German Historical Institute Paris (1958)
- German Historical Institute London (1976)
- German Historical Institute Washington DC (1987)
- German Historical Institute Warsaw (1993)
- German Historical Institute Moscow (2005)

== See also ==
- German Studies Association
- Perspectivia.net
