= Institute of Oriental Studies =

Institute of Oriental Studies, sometimes also rendered as Institute of (or for) Orientalism may refer to a number of research and education institutions worldwide in the field of Oriental studies:

- Institute of Oriental Studies of the Russian Academy of Sciences, formerly of the USSR Academy of Sciences, a research institute in Moscow and Saint Petersburg (under this name since 1930)
- Moscow Institute of Oriental Studies, a university-level educational institution in Moscow in 1920–1954
- A number of "Institutes of Oriental Studies" within the Academies of Sciences of many Republics of the USSR

== See also ==
- Oriental Institute (disambiguation)
