= Peter Wende =

German historian and professor

Peter Wende (17 March 1936 in Athens – 26 July 2017 in Frankfurt am Main) was a German historian who was a professor at the University of Frankfurt am Main and later director of the German Historical Institute London from September 1994 to August 2000.
