= Andreas Gestrich =

German historian (born 1952)

Professor Andreas Gestrich (born 3 July 1952) is a German historian who was director of the German Historical Institute London from 2006 to 2018.

== Early life and education ==
Gestrich was born on 3 July 1952. He studied from 1973 to 1979 history, Latin and Russian at the Free University of Berlin and at the Universities of Tübingen and Bristol. In 1979 he completed his studies with the first state examination for teaching at grammar schools in the subjects of history and Latin. Instead of teaching, Gestrich became a research assistant to a DFG project on the social history of childhood, youth and family at the Institute of Education at the University of Tübingen. In 1983 he moved to the University of Stuttgart, where he habilitated in 1992.

== Career ==
From 1992 to 1997 Gestrich held substitute professorships in Würzburg, Karlsruhe and Trier. Since 1997 Gestrich has been professor of modern history at the University of Trier. In September 2006 he became director of the German Historical Institute in London.

His research interests include the history of the family, childhood and youth, the history of poverty and poor relief, media history and the social history of religious groups.

== Honours ==
In February 2006, Gestrich was awarded the Order of Merit of Rhineland-Palatinate. In August 2018, he was awarded the President's Medal of the British Academy "for his contribution to the study of German and Continental European History".

== Selected publications ==
- Traditionelle Jugendkultur in einer ländlicher Arbeitergemeinde Württemberg 1800-1920 (= Kritische Studien zur Geschichtswissenschaft. Band 69). Vandenhoeck und Ruprecht, Göttingen 1986, ISBN 3-525-35728-1 (Dissertation Universität Tübingen 1982/1983).
- Absolutismus und Öffentlichkeit: politische Kommunikation in Deutschland zu Beginn des 18. Jahrhunderts (= Kritische Studien zur Geschichtswissenschaft. Band 103). Vandenhoeck und Ruprecht, Göttingen 1994, ISBN 3-525-35766-4 (Habilitationsschrift Universität Stuttgart 1992).
