= Adolf M. Birke =

German historian (1939–2024)

Adolf M. Birke (12 October 1939 – 10 August 2024) was a German historian who was professor emeritus of modern history at LMU Munich. He was director of the German Historical Institute London from August 1985 to August 1994. Born in Wellingholzhausen on 12 October 1939, he died on 10 August 2024, at the age of 84.
