= Les amis du bus des femmes =

French sex worker association established in 1990

Les amis du bus des femmes is a French association established in 1990 by former sex workers as a support group for sex workers.

The original initiative stemmed from a need to educate sex workers on AIDS. It quickly became established as a bridging organisation between sex workers on the street and the provision of medical, social and administrative services. Its Paris headquarters is open daily to the population it serves. In addition it has eight permanent mobile units (buses) operating day and night in the areas frequented by sex workers in the capital, staffed by organisational and health professionals.

The principal mission of the association, whose administration consists of both sex workers and non-sex workers, is to work with and for sex workers to prevent HIV, hepatitis and sexually transmitted diseases. They distribute condoms and encourage sex workers to visit the office to get help with administrative, medical, and social needs, and conducts job searches for those who decide to transition out of sex work. Emphasis is placed on helping workers access their health, social and human rights. The objective is to enable workers to develop an environment that supports an active role for them in stating their needs and demands. In working with and for sex workers, the association fights against discrimination, social exclusion and human trafficking.

The association opposes abolitionism and its objective to eradicate sex work, and recognizes that some women have freely chosen to engage in sex work and that that choice must be respected. The association deals with both voluntary and involuntary sex workers, such as those trafficked from Eastern Europe, Africa and Asia.

Currently the association has fourteen employees including doctors and nurses, facilitators and an employment counsellor. It is funded from government grants which are allocated by agencies such as DDASS Paris (Direction départementale des Affaires sanitaires et sociales), the Paris conseil général, the CPAM de Paris (Caisse primaire d'assurance maladie) and the Conseil régional. The project also receives funding from the European Commission's Daphne Funding Programme.

The association has been politically active, for instance opposing the Sarkozy laws on solicitation. Claude Boucher appeared for them before the senate hearings.

== See also ==
- Prostitution in France
