= Thomas W. Gaehtgens =

German art historian (born 1940)

Thomas Wolfgang Gaehtgens (born June 24, 1940 in Leipzig) is a German art historian with special interest in French and German art and art history from the 18th to the 20th century. He was the founding director of the Deutsches Forum für Kunstgeschichte in Paris (Centre Allemand d'Histoire de l'Art de Paris; German Center for the History of Art, Paris) and was director of the Getty Research Institute in Los Angeles, California.

== Scholarly life and work ==
In 1966, Gaehtgens completed his Ph.D. dissertation on the French Renaissance sculptor Germain Pilon at the University of Bonn. In 1972 he published his Habilitationsschrift about Joseph-Marie Vien at the University of Göttingen. For some years he worked as an adjunct professor at the Art History Seminar of this university. From 1979 to 1980, he spent some research time at the Institute for Advanced Study in Princeton, New Jersey. From 1980 until his retirement in 2006 he was Professor of Art History at the Free University of Berlin.

Soon after his appointment to Berlin's University, Gaehtgens began turning his attention to pre-twentieth-century American art, which was not a primary field for art historians at German universities at that time. In 1985–86 he was a visiting scholar with the Getty Center for the History of Art and the Humanities. In 1988, this led to a major exhibition of American 18th- and 19th-century painting in Germany. In 1992, Gaehtgens took over the organization of the Twenty-Eighth International Congress of the History of Art in Berlin. From 1992 to 1996, Gaehtgens was president of the Comité International d'Histoire de l'Art (CIHA), which is supported by the Association of Art Historians. In 1997, he founded, with German, French, and Swiss colleagues, the Deutsches Forum für Kunstgeschichte in Paris (Centre Allemand d'Histoire de l'Art de Paris), which organizes conferences, symposia, and workshops, undertakes research projects, and has published many books on art. From 1998 to 1999 he was Chaire européenne at the Collège de France. In 2004, he received an honorary doctorate at the Courtauld Institute of Art, London.

In November 2007, he was appointed director of the Getty Research Institute (GRI) in Los Angeles, California. According to the late James N. Wood, formerly president and CEO of the J. Paul Getty Trust, "Thomas Gaehtgens is uniquely qualified to serve as director of the Getty Research Institute. His contributions to our appreciation and understanding of the visual arts through his own scholarship, his creation of opportunities for others, and his realization of a wide range of publications, combined with his international experience and network of colleagues, assure the continuing dynamism of the GRI and promises new opportunities for its exceptional staff."

In 2009, Gaehtgens received the Grand prix de la francophonie of the Académie française and in 2011 an honorary doctorate from the Paris-Sorbonne University. In 2011, he was elected a Fellow of the American Academy of Arts and Sciences.

In 2009, he published the first issue of the Getty Research Journal, which features the work of established and emerging art historians, museum curators, and conservators around the world as part of the Getty's mission to promote critical thinking in the presentation, conservation, and interpretation of the world's artistic legacy. In 2011/2012, he co-curated Pacific Standard Time: Art in L.A., 1945-1980, a scholarly collaboration of artists, curators, critics and over 60 cultural institutions across Southern California, coming together for six months to produce exhibitions that told the story of the birth of the Los Angeles art scene and how it became a major new force in the art world.

According to James Cuno, "Professor Gaehtgens is a committed internationalist, at home in German, French, and English, with students and scholar colleagues around the world sharing his internationalist values and joining him on research and professional projects that advance our common understanding of our world's shared artistic legacy." Gaehtgens retired from his position at the Getty in 2018.

== Private life ==
Thomas Gaehtgens is married to Barbara Gaehtgens, an art historian specializing in Dutch and French 17th century art. They have two children.

== Select publications ==
- Zum frühen und reifen Werk des Germain Pilon: Stilkritische Studien zur französischen Skulptur um die Mitte des 16. Jahrhunderts. Ph.D. dissertation. Bonn 1966.
- Napoleons Arc de Triomphe. Göttingen 1974.
- Max Klinger. Bielefeld 1976.
- Bilder vom irdischen Glück: Giorgione, Tizian, Rubens, Watteau, Fragonard. Berlin 1983.
- Versailles de la residence royale au musee historique: La galerie des batailles dans le musee historique de Louis-Philippe. Antwerpen 1984.
- Versailles als Nationaldenkmal: Die Galerie des Batailles im Musée Historique von Louis-Philippe. Berlin 1985.
- Johann Joachim Winckelmann, 1717-1768. Hamburg 1986.
- Deutsche Zeichnungen des 18. Jahrhunderts zwischen Tradition und Aufklärung: Eine Ausstellung aus den Beständen des Berliner Kupferstichkabinetts. Berlin 1987.
- (with Jacques Lugand), Joseph-Marie Vien: Peintre du Roi (1716-1809). Paris 1988.
- Anton von Werner, Die Proklamierung des Deutschen Kaiserreiches: Ein Historienbild im Wandel preußischer Politik. Frankfurt am Main 1990.
- Die Berliner Museumsinsel im Deutschen Kaiserreich. Zur Kulturpolitik der Museen in der wilhelminischen Epoche. Munich 1992
- American Icons: Transatlantic Perspectives on Eighteenth- and Nineteenth-Century American Art. Chicago 1992.
- "Künstlerischer Austausch – Artistic Exchange", in Akten des XXVIII. Internationalen Kongresses für Kunstgeschichte, Berlin 15 – 20 July 1992. 3 volumes. Berlin 1993.
- Historienmalerei. Berlin 1996.
- Kennerschaft: Kolloquium zum 150sten Geburtstag von Wilhelm von Bode. Berlin 1996.
- Mein Leben: Wilhelm von Bode. Berlin 1997.
- Kunsthalle Bremen: Gemäldegalerie, Kupferstichkabinett und Neue Medien. Paris 1998.
- Mäzenatisches Handeln: Studien zur Kultur des Bürgersinns in der Gesellschaft. Festschrift für Günter Braun zum 70. Geburtstag. Berlin 1998.
- (with Krzysztof Pomian), Le XVIIIe siècle: Histoire Artistique de l'Europe. Paris 1998.
- L'art sans frontières, Paris-Berlin les relations artistiques franco-allemandes. Paris 1999.
- Collège de France: chaire européenne; leçon inaugurale faite le Jeudi 29 janvier 1999. Paris 1999.
- Menzels Théâtre du Gymnase. Berlin 1999.
- Ludwig Justi: Werden, Wirken, Wissen: Lebenserinnerungen aus fünf Jahrzehnten. Berlin, 2000.
- L'art et les normes sociales au XVIIIe siècle, Paris 2001.
- Das Bauhaus und Frankreich. Paris 2002.
- Adolph Menzel im Labyrinth der Wahrnehmung: Kolloquium anläßlich der Berliner Menzel-Ausstellung 1997. Berlin 2002.
- Place des Victoires: Histoire, architecture, société. Paris 2003.
- Historienmalerei. Darmstadt 2003.
- Corot bis Monet: Von Barbizon zum Impressionismus; Schenkung Bühler-Brockhaus an das Museum der Bildenden Künste Leipzig; zur Eröffnung des Museumsneubaus im Jahr 2004. Leipzig 2003.
- Distanz und Aneignung 1870-1945: Kunstbeziehungen zwischen Deutschland und Frankreich. Berlin 2004.
- Der Bürger als Mäzen: Amerikanische Tradition - europäische Herausforderung? Berlin 2005.
- L'image du roi de François Ier à Louis XIV. Paris 2006.
- " 'Love fleeing slavery': a sketch in the Princeton University Art Museum", Record / Princeton University Art Museum 65 2006), pp. 12–21.
- (with Gregor Wedekind), Le culte des grands hommes 1750-1850. Paris 2009.
- Perspectives croisées: La critique d'art franco-allemande 1870-1945. Paris 2009.
- L'art, l'histoire, l'histoire de l'art. Paris 2011.
- (with Louis Marchesano), Display and Art History: The Düsseldorf Gallery and Its Catalogue. Los Angeles 2011.
- L'art, l'histoire, l'histoire de l'art. Avant-propos d'Andreas Beyer, Préface de Pierre Nora, Editions de la Maison des sciences de l'homme, Paris, 2011. ISBN 978-2-7351-1398-9
