= German Institute for Japanese Studies =

Japanese-based German research institute

The German Institute for Japanese Studies (DIJ Tokyo, German: Deutsches Institut für Japanstudien) is a German government-funded research institute based in Tokyo, focused on the study of modern Japan in a global context. The director is Verena Blechinger-Talcott (since 2026).

== History ==
The DIJ was founded in 1988 and follows in the tradition of Germany’s overseas research institutes, which began with the founding of the German Archaeological Institute in 1829.

The institute joined the Max Weber Foundation on September 1, 2002. In August 2006, the DIJ moved into its new premises in the Jochi Kioizaka Building on the main campus (Yotsuya Campus) of Sophia University.

== Publications ==
The DIJ publishes the international academic journal Contemporary Japan as well as several publication series, including monographs, Miscellanea, working papers, and bibliographies. Audio recordings of some DIJ events are available as well as videos on the DIJ YouTube channel. In addition, the quarterly digital DIJ Newsletter provides information about the Institute’s activities.

== See also ==
- Germany–Japan relations
