= Oriental Research Institute =

Oriental Research Institute may refer to:

- Oriental Research Institute Mysore, India
- Bhandarkar Oriental Research Institute, Pune, India
- Oriental Research Institute & Manuscripts Library, Kerala, India
- Rajasthan Oriental Research Institute, India
