= German Center for Art History =

French-based German art history research institute

The German Center for Art History (Deutsches Forum für Kunstgeschichte or DFK Paris) is an independent art history research institute. Located in the heart of Paris, the DFK Paris is a forum for experts from around the world to exchange ideas.

Here, French and German intellectual traditions engage in a fruitful dialogue with international currents of thought, promoting innovative interdisciplinary research on the arts of both countries, viewed in a global context. From mediaeval to contemporary art, numerous topics are explored in research projects, fellowships and symposia; the results are then made available to a wider public through series published by the institute.

The DFK Paris, like its partner institutes in Beirut, Istanbul, London, Moscow, Rome, Tokyo, Warsaw, and Washington, belongs to the Max Weber Foundation – Foundation of German Humanities Institutes Abroad (DGIA), a public-law foundation under the authority of the German federal government. The DFK Paris is funded through this foundation by the German Federal Ministry of Education and Research (BMBF).

== History ==
The German Center for Art History was founded in 1997 as a project funded by the German Federal Ministry of Education and Research. Its inception fulfilled a longstanding wish in the art history research community, to provide an institutional framework for studies on French art and its reception around the world.

An important goal was to centralize German-language art historical research in France as well as to spark the interest of French researchers in German art and in German-language art history. Over the years, as an independent research institute, the DFK Paris has become a forum for lively international exchange about art history and theory.

Following a recommendation from its Academic Advisory Council, the DFK Paris became a member of the Foundation of German Humanities Institutes Abroad (DGIA) in 2006, operating directly under the German federal government, which became the Max Weber Foundation in 2012. Initially located at Place des Victoires, the DFK Paris has been housed since October 2011in the Hôtel Lully. It is thus located in the immediate vicinity of the French National Institute for Art History (Institut national d'histoire de l'art - INHA), one of its main partner institutions, as well as its library.

== Direction ==
1997 to 2007 Thomas W. Gaehtgens (Founding Director)

2007 to 2009 Julia Drost (Interim Director)

2009 to 2014 Andreas Beyer

In February 2014 Thomas Kirchner, expert for French art of the 17th and 18th centuries, became the head of the institute.

== Fellowships & Scholarships ==
Supporting young researchers from around the world is a core mission of the German Center for Art History. Many different programs, funded by the German Federal Ministry of Education and Research, are available for undergraduate, graduate, and postdoctoral students as well as assistant professors and those seeking accreditation to become full professors. The center also has a mission as a facilitator between researchers in France and Germany, and it encourages networking among young researchers from around the world.

The financial aid programs of the DFK Paris include short-term scholarships, longer-term funding for PhD and postdoctoral researchers, and other formats, such as study trips, courses, and colloquia for specific educational purposes. The extensive scholarship program enables young researchers to conduct research in France and to exchange on their topics with the DFK Paris team of researchers.

Every year, an annual theme is selected to address current debates in the field. The resulting topics provide a starting point from which an international group of grant recipients conducts research in the framework of a study program. The results of their research projects are made available to a wideraudience through specialized symposia, academic conferences, and series published by the German Center for Art History.

== Research projects ==
In addition to individual research activities, the DFK Paris is engaged in long-term projects that involve international cooperations with institutions in France and abroad

- ARCHITRAVE – Art and Architecture in German Travel Accounts to Paris and Versailles in the Baroque Era
- Displaced Images: The Modern Faces of Art
- Surrealism and Money: Dealers, Collectors, and Gallerists
- OwnReality. To Each His Own Reality
- Travelling Art Histories
- Catalog of the historic collections of the Hôtel de Beauharnais in Paris
- Between Art, Science and Occupation Policy
- Digital Humanities

== Publications ==
The German Center for Art History publishes works by its own researchers and accepts essays and monographies by art historians from around the world. The editorial line, at first oriented toward annual themes and long-term projects, has opened up to other methodological and historiographical perspectives. It now incorporates studies on subjects as varied as artistic exchanges, art collections and collectors, classical architecture, art theory, and the political significance of images.

In addition to its Passages/Passagen, Passerelles, and Monographies series, published by Éditions de la Maison des sciences de l'homme (MSH) in France and by the Deutscher Kunstverlag (DKV) in Germany, the DFK Paris recently created the Passages online series, available on Heidelberg University's open access publication platform arthistoricum.net – ART-Books. The institute's publication program is rounded out by numerous co-editions developed with partner institutions.

Alongside print editions, the DFK Paris now produces digital editions, following an open access policy.

=== Passages/Passagen ===
Initially publishing conference proceedings and papers of the annual themes at the DFK Paris, the Passages/Passagen series was expanded to include broader areas of research, mostly from PhD and postdoctoral dissertations in art history. In the Passages/Passagen series, equal attention is paid to the writing, critical apparatus, images, and graphic design, resulting in outstanding scholarly works, accessible to a wide readership.

=== Passages online ===
The DFK Paris fully supports the principle of open access, in order to make the results of its research quickly and easily available to an international readership. In 2017, the two existing publication series, Passages/Passagen and Passerelles, were joined by Passages online, which presents the results of scholarly colloquia and annual themes in digital form. These publications are accessible as Open Access online resources via arthistoricum.net – ART-Books. Additionally, some volumes are available as print-on-demand publications.

=== Passerelles ===
The Passerelles series is dedicated to essays on art history. Short texts analyze the history of critical reception, artistic tastes, and anthropological aspects of art; provide in-depth studies of historiographical works and debates; and delve into theoretical questions or specific genres chosen by artists. As such, these essays offer new possibilities for exploring different times, places, and disciplines.

== Library ==
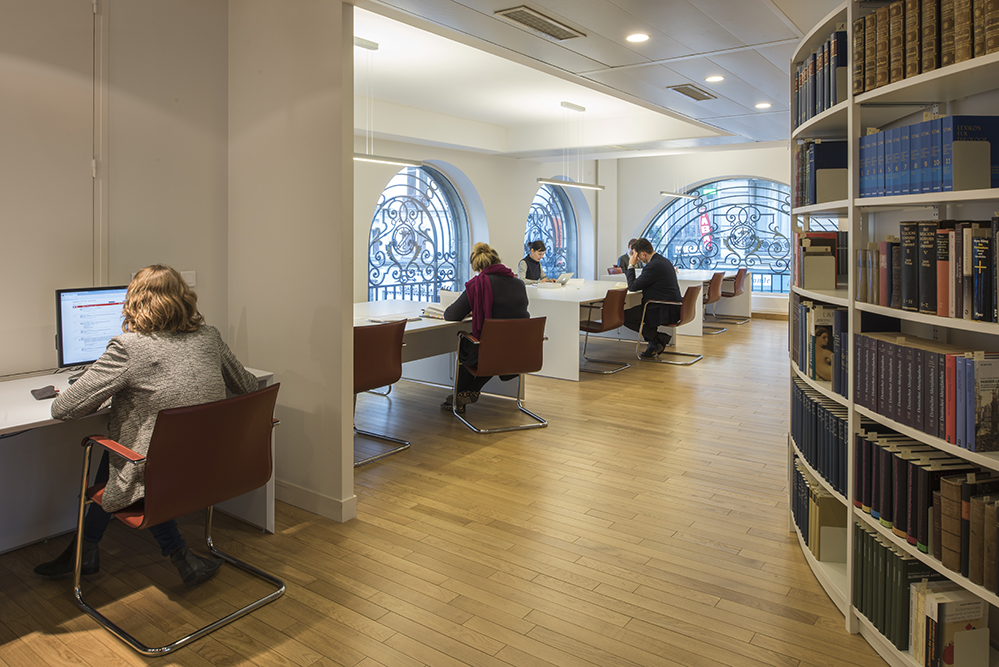
Reading room of the DFK Paris library

The German Center for Art History houses a specialized library on German art, cultural and scholarly history. It offers an overview of art theoretical literature on France as well as French-German artistic relations.

The library supports researchers at the center in their research projects on French art history. With thematic emphases such as fashion, the history of art collecting, the Bauhaus or provenance research, it reflects the vitality of a spectrum of research spanning from the Middle Ages to the present.

A unique collection of art theoretical and aesthetic texts, composed largely of original editions from the seventeenth to the twentieth century, countless rarities, as well as digital collections and databases, can be viewed in the reading room of the Hôtel Lully. Of the 96,000 resources currently available and the 193 circulating, primarily German-language journals, more than 80 percent are on display in open stacks. Readers of the DFK Paris library benefit from its close proximity to its partner libraries at the INHA, with which the library is linked through a cooperation agreement, as well as to the special collections of the Bibliothèque nationale de France (BnF), the Louvre, and the Centre Pompidou.

The forum is a member of the Art Libraries Network Florence-Paris-Munich-Rome, kubikat, whose world-renowned online catalog represents the most comprehensive library database on art history. It currently comprises more than 1.7 million titles, 900,000 of which are articles from scholarly journals, collected volumes, and online publications. The kubikat is in cooperation with the Bibliotheksverbund Bayern (BVB) and the Art Discovery Group Catalogue.

== Hôtel Lully ==
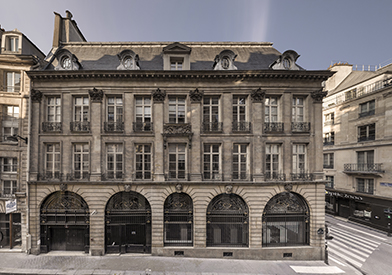
German Center for Art History (DFK Paris), Hôtel Lully

Hôtel Lully, the building housing the German Center for Art History, is located in the first arrondissement of Paris. Built in the seventeenth century, the Hôtel Lully owes its construction to Jean-Baptiste Lully, an Italian-born French composer who became the court composer for Louis XIV. According to a local legend, Lully received 11,000 livres from Molière to help purchase the land and construct the building. The decorative splendor dating from the reign of the Sun King remains visible in the façade, embellished with Bacchanalian masks—a registered historic monument—a bas-relief depicting musical symbols, and the ceiling paintings in the drawing room.

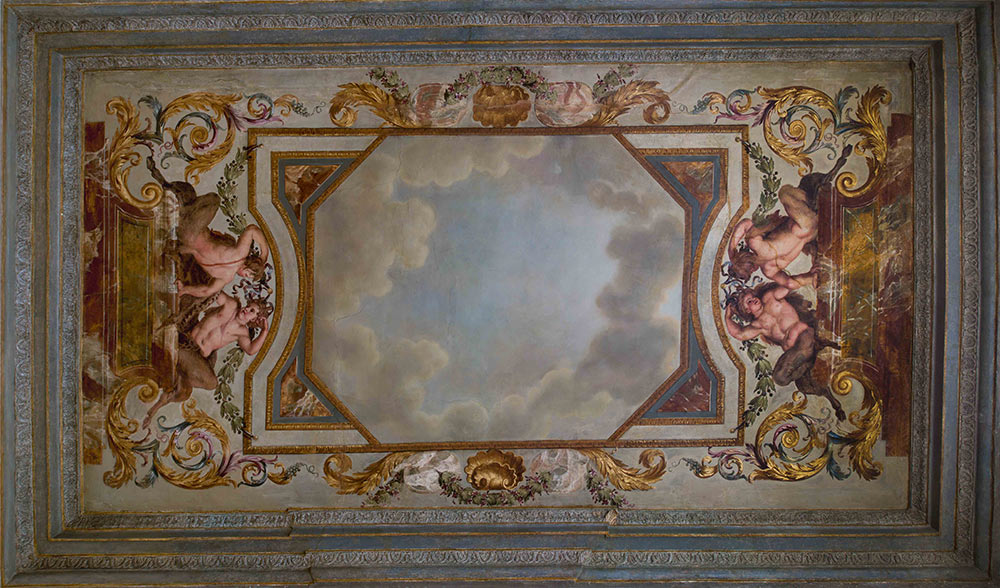
Ceiling paintings in the Salon Lully

In addition to the freely accessible library and its reading room, the now modern interiors feature a conference room in the basement, a meeting room with videoconferencing capabilities, a research studio for grant recipients, and offices for the DFK Paris team and third-party funded research projects.
