= Carl Haase (archivist) =

German historian

Carl Haase (26 January 1920 – 7 January 1990) was a German historian and director of the Hanover State Archives. He was a specialist in the history of the medieval town and the history of Hanover in the 18th to the 19th centuries. It was his idea, in 1968, to create the German Historical Institute London.
