= Beylerbeylik (Safavid Persia) =

Administrative entities in Safavid Iran

In Safavid Iran, a beylerbeylik was a large administrative entity. Each beylerbeylik was governed by a beylerbey ("bey of bey", that is, commander-in-chief). The term was also used in the Ottoman Empire.

In the 17th century, the Safavid state was divided into thirteen beylerbeydoms. Lands under the personal ownership of the shah in the Safavid state were not part of the beylerbeyliks.

Beylerbeys, usually titled khans, possessed administrative power and headed local troops. In the beginning of the 17th century, the Safavid shahs unsuccessfully attempted to limit the beylerbeys' power.

== See also ==
- Beylerbeylik
