= Paul Kluke =

German historian (1908–1990)

Paul Kluke

Professor Paul Otto Alfred Kluke (31 July 1908, in Dabendorf near Zossen – 18 April 1990, in Wiesbaden) was director of the German Historical Institute London from August 1975 to July 1977.
