= Beylerbeylik =

15th–18th century administrative area

A beylerbeylik was a large administrative entity within the Ottoman Empire and Safavid Empire during the 15th-18th centuries. They were governed by beylerbeys ("bey of beys" i.e., commanders-in-chief).

- For Ottoman Beyerbeyliks, see Eyalet
- For Safavid Beylerbeyliks, see Beylerbeylik (Safavid Persia)
