= Max Weber Foundation =

German research organization

The Max Weber Foundation (Ger. Max Weber Stiftung) is a German humanities research organisation based in Bonn and funded by the German Federal Government. It is composed of eleven independent institutes:

- Six German Historical Institutes
- German Forum for Art History Paris
- German Institute for Japanese Studies (Tokyo)
- Orient-Institut Beirut
- Orient-Institut Istanbul
- Max Weber Forum for South Asian Studies in Delhi
