= Orient-Institut Istanbul =

Max Weber Foundation research institute in Turkey

The Orient-Institut Istanbul is a research institute of the Max Weber Foundation based in Istanbul, Turkey. It studies Ottoman, Mediterranean and Turkish culture, history and society. It was separated from the Orient-Institut Beirut as an independent institute in 2009.
