= Orient-Institut Beirut =

Lebanese-based research institute

Coordinates: 33.8934°N 35.4968°E

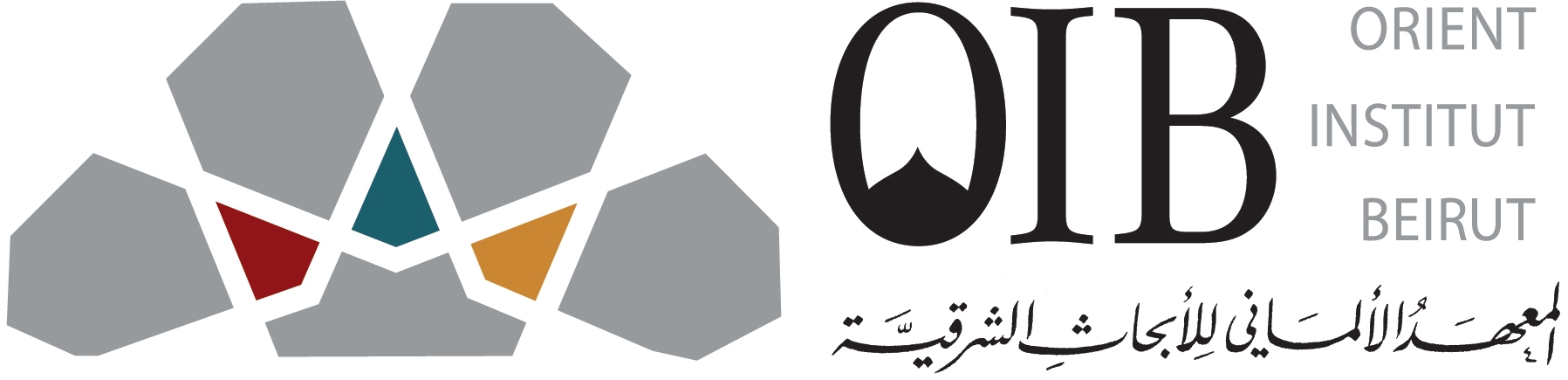
- Founder: German Oriental Society
- Established: 1961
- Mission: Interdisciplinary academic research on the Middle East and the Arab world
- Staff: ca. 23
- Address: Rue Hussein Beyhum 44, Zokak el-Blat, POBox 11-2988 Beirut
- Location: Beirut, Lebanon
- Website: http://www.orient-institut.org

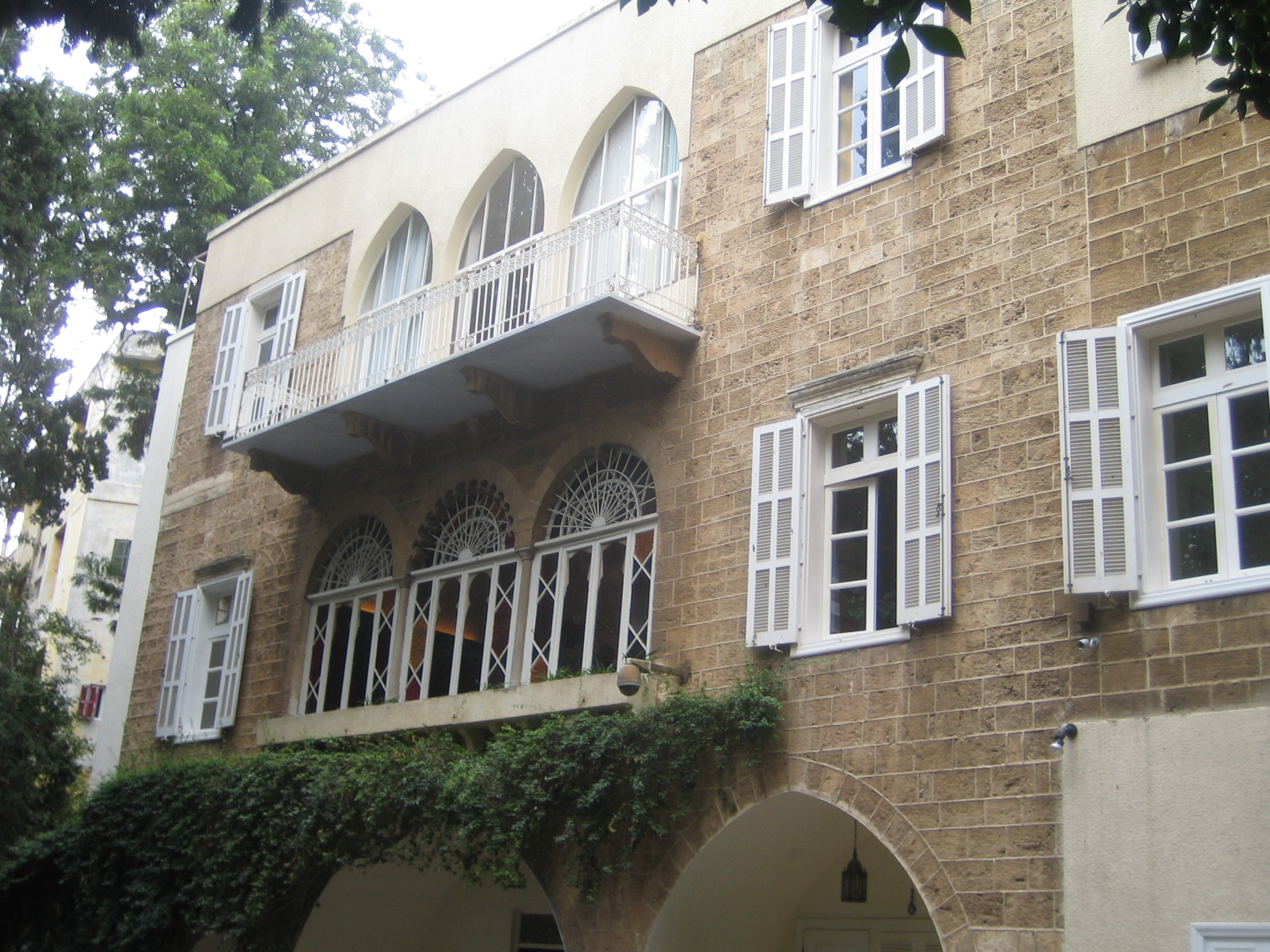
Orient-Institut Beirut

The Orient-Institut Beirut (OIB; Arabic: المعهد الألماني للأبحاث الشرقية) is one of ten German Humanities Institutes Abroad which belong to the Max Weber Foundation. The OIB was established in 1961 by the Deutsche Morgenländische Gesellschaft (German Oriental Society) and is part of the Max Weber Foundation since 2003. The OIB supports and promotes independent research on the historical and contemporary Middle East and the Arab world in cooperation with researchers and academic institutions throughout the region.

== History ==
The Orient-Institut Beirut was founded in 1961 by the German Oriental Society (Deutsche Morgenländische Gesellschaft), an academic association founded in 1845 to promote the study of the languages and cultures of the “Orient”. It was financed by the German Federal Ministry of Research and Technology, the Fritz Thyssen Foundation, the VolkswagenStiftung and the German Research Association (DFG). In 1963, the institute gained the legal recognition of the Lebanese government and moved to its present premises in the former Villa Maud Farajallah in the quarter of Zokak al-Blat, near the downtown area of Beirut.

Since 2003 the Orient-Institut Beirut belongs to the Max Weber Foundation – German Humanities Institutes Abroad. After the German staff had to be temporarily evacuated to Istanbul in 1987, the Orient-Institut Istanbul (OI Istanbul) – which had been a branch of the Beirut institute for 20 years – became an independent institution inside the Max Weber Foundation in 2009.

== Academic profile and tasks ==
The OIB is an interdisciplinary research institute. The study of social, religious, and intellectual history, as well as the study of literature, language and politics figures among the various projects undertaken at the institute.

== Library ==
The library of the OIB is open for public use and offers around 140.000 volumes and 1.700 periodicals. Its collection includes studies on religion, philosophy, and law as well as on literature, history and contemporary themes related to the Middle East. Material is gathered in Western languages, in Arabic and occasionally in Persian and Turkish.

== Publication series ==
The OIB publishes two series of publications and one online-publication.

- In the series Bibliotheca Islamica (Arabic: النشرات الإسلامية) manuscripts dating back from the 11th century onwards are edited as books. These critical editions include Arabic, Persian and Turkish texts - on topics ranging from history, prosopography, philosophy, literature and theology to Sufism.
- In the series Beiruter Texte und Studien (Beirut Texts and Studies) academic studies, monographs, and conference proceedings are published in German, English, Arabic and French.
- In cooperation with the Orient-Institut Istanbul, the OIB publishes the online series Orient-Institut Studies on perspectivia.net. This series is meant to combine regional and trans-regional perspectives in Middle Eastern and Euro-Asian Studies.

== List of directors ==
- 1961 – 1963 Hans Robert Roemer
- 1963 – 1968 Fritz Steppat
- 1968 – 1973 Stefan Wild
- 1974 – 1978 Peter Bachmann
- 1979 – 1980 Ulrich Haarmann
- 1981 – 1984 Gernot Rotter
- 1984 – 1989 Anton Heinen
- 1989 – 1994 Erika Glassen
- 1994 – 1999 Angelika Neuwirth
- 1999 – 2007 Manfred Kropp
- 2007 - 2017 Stefan Leder
- 2017 - 2022 Birgit Schäbler
- 2022 - 2023 Thomas Würtz
- 2023 - Now Jens Hanßen

== Bibliography ==
- Peskes, Esther/ Strohmeier, Martin (Hrg.): 1961-1991: Orient-Institut der Deutschen Morgenländischen Gesellschaft. Istanbul: Türk Hoechst 1991.
- Orient-Institut Beirut (Hrg.): 50 Years of Orient-Institut Beirut: Five Decades of German Research in/on the Near East. 1961 – 2011, Beirut 2011.
- Rotter, Gernot / Köhler, Wolfgang: Orient-Institut der Morgenländischen Gesellschaft in Beirut. Beirut: Imprimerie Catholique 1981.
