= Aux Belles Poules =

Brothel in Paris

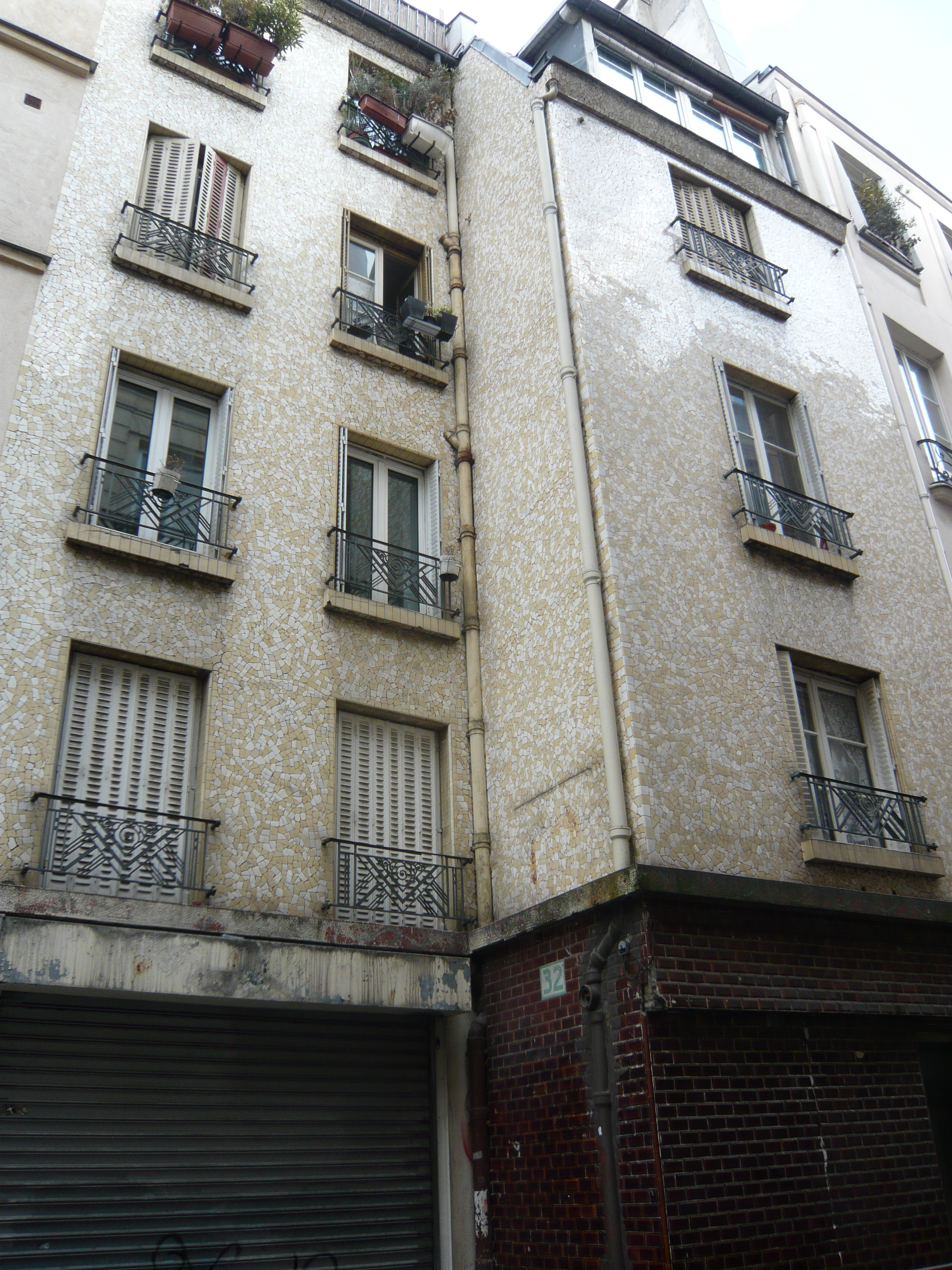
- Aux Belles Poules facade

- Location in Paris
- Address: 32-34 Rue Blondel, 2nd Arrondissement
- Location: Paris, France
- Coordinates: 48°52′8.18″N 2°21′9.42″E

Construction
- Built: c1904
- Closed: 1946

The Aux Belles Poules (French: literally to beautiful hens, poule is a colloquialism for prostitutes) was a well-known Parisian maison close (brothel), established at 32-34 Rue Blondel in the 2nd Arrondissement.

== Operation ==
The Aux Belles Poules was built around 1904 in an Art deco style. It featured walls covered with magnificent erotic mosaics.

A special attraction of the establishment was that the women employed there staged small erotic shows, with which they proved special craftsmanship in the application of their vulva. The writer Henri Calet describes this in his book La Belle Lurette, published in 1935:

The ladies won forty sous at a game; we had to put the coins on the table edges, while the ladies "sucked" them with the slit of their belly [...]

The writer Pierre Deveaux also describes the brothel in his book La Langue verte and describes in detail a mechanical piano, the guests and anecdotes about the women:

The ladies standing for the dance are dressed with gentlemen, before they "climb up". In doing so, they invent jokes, which are always old and young: they put a burning cigarette in their fiddle or try to suck the coins lying on the edges of the table with the same organ, which then turns into an open box.

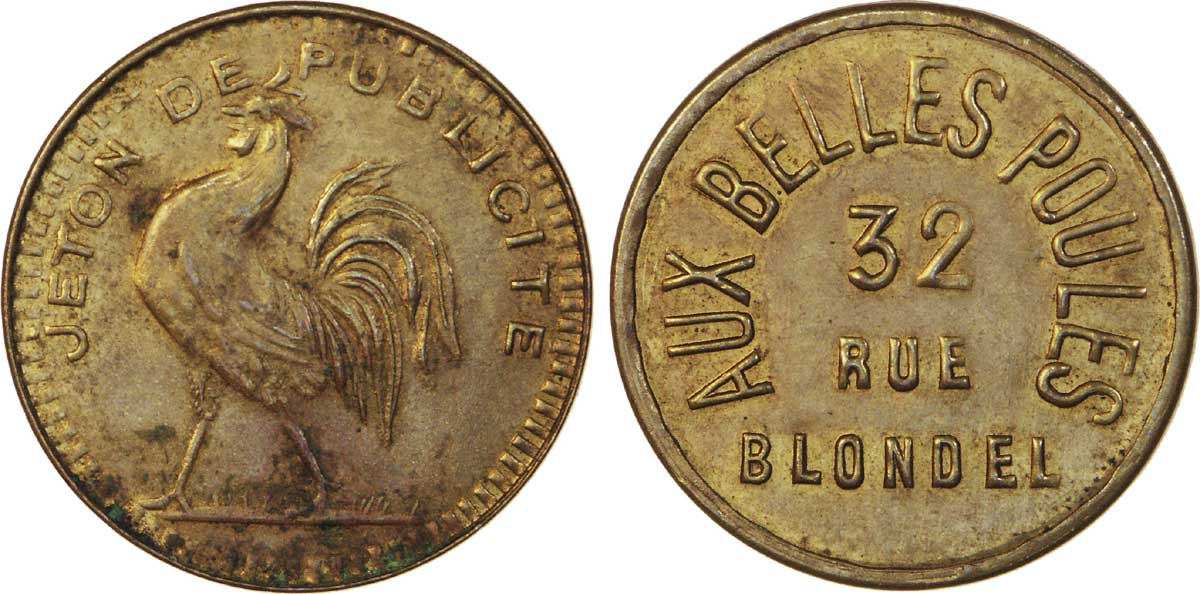
Brothel token from the Aux Belles Poules

The coins were in-house coins, similar to the chips in the casino. They had a diameter of about 22 mm and on the one hand "AUX BELLES POULES 32 RUE BLONDEL" and on the other a large chicken with the inscription "PIECE DE PUBLICITÉ". Other brothels also had such coins, these are now auctioned as curio coins.

The brothel was also known for its tableaux vivants, in which erotic scenes were portrayed by women who were partly equipped with strap-ons.

The establishment was visited by well-to-do couples from the city as well as traveling tourists. Guests of the house included Jules Pascin and Henry Miller, accompanied by Anaïs Nin.

During the German occupation, Aux Belles Poules, like several other luxury Parisian brothels, was requisitioned for the use of German officers, in order to prevent their contacts with the local population. The health services of the Wehrmacht were responsible for organizing the sanitary control of these establishments. Captain Haucke, commissioner of Geheime Feldpolizei, was responsible for managing prostitution in Paris.

== Closure ==
In 1946 Aux Belles Poules, like all the Parisian brothels, was closed in the course of the Loi Marthe Richard, with whom the government wanted to fight prostitution. The last opening evening is described by historian Louis Chevalier in his book Histoire de la nuit parisienne.

The building was converted into a student accommodation.

In 1996, the building in Rue Blondel was declared a Historic Monument because of its previous importance.

== Modern day ==
Unlike other maisons close of the same era, the interior of the building has been preserved. The erotic mosaics and huge mirrors are still in place.

It currently used as a restaurant and event venue. Events include readings of naughty plays and burlesque shows. It can also be hired as a film set.

== See also ==
- Prostitution in France
- Parisian Brothels
- One-Two-Two
- Le Chabanais
- Le Sphinx
- La Fleur blanche
