= History of prostitution in France =

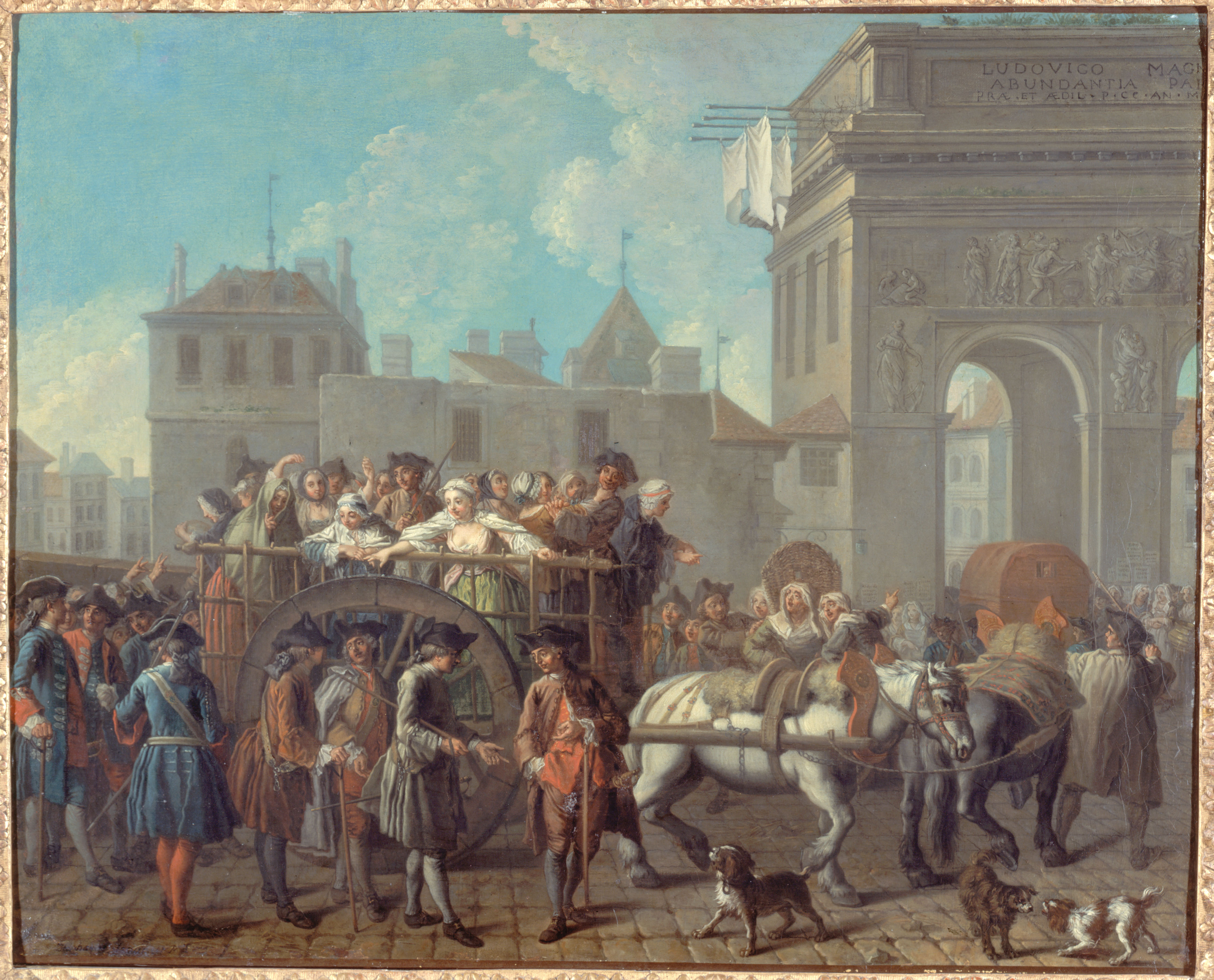
Étienne Jeaurat, Le transport des filles de joie de l'Hôpital, 1755, musée Carnavalet

The history of prostitution in France has similarities with the history of prostitution in other countries in Europe, namely a succession of periods of tolerance and repression, but with certain distinct features such as a relatively long period of tolerance of brothels.

== Middle Ages ==
=== Early Medieval Period ===
After the period of Roman rule, the Visigoth monarch Theodoric I (ruled 418–451) persecuted pimps, violence was often used against them, the maximum penalty being death. His grandson Alaric II promulgated the Breviary of Alaric in 506, one of its provisions was the prohibition of prostitution. A public flogging was the proscribed penalty. Under this code both pimps and prostitutes were included. Clovis I introduced the code to Frankish Gaul.

Charlemagne (768–814 AD) further attempted to suppress prostitution, declaring flogging (300 lashes) as a punishment in his capitularies. This was primarily aimed at the common man, since concubines were common amongst the ruling classes. Some idea of the seriousness with which the state regarded the offense is provided by the fact that 300 lashes was the severest sentence prescribed by the Code Alaric (Breviary of Alaric). Offenders also had their hair cut off, and in the case of recidivism, could be sold as slaves. There is no evidence that any of this was effective.

=== General tolerance ===
In the Middle Ages, the authorities, whether the municipalities, lords or kings, organised or supervised prostitution within institutions. Buildings run by the bourgeois or the church, (particularly abbesses in the 14th and 15th centuries) paid a lease to the authorities. These public brothels were indicated by a red lantern lit by the keeper of the house during opening hours.

In general, prostitutes were not marginalised but integrated into a society where they have a role to play. In the fabliaux of the Middle Ages, the prostitutes were accomplices of other women and helped them to avenge the so-called seducers. The cathedral of Chartres has a stained glass window of the Parable of the Prodigal Son which was given by prostitutes, in the same way that other windows were given by other trade guilds.

The regulations of this time were often municipal, and limited to supervising the activity:

- Freedom of activity in certain streets or neighbourhoods;
- Restrictions on the freedoms of prostitutes (travel, associates);
- Compulsory clothing to distinguish prostitutes from other women (girdles);
- Days and hours of opening the houses (10 am to 6 pm or 8 pm in Paris; Monday to Saturday, closing during Sunday Mass and Holy Week).
- Alongside this legal public prostitution, are private institutions (hotels, taverns and fr:bordelages) and prostitutes who worked on the street or went from hotel to hotel.

Under Philippe-Auguste an irregular militia, the Ribauds, was instituted around 1189, to whom the policing of the public girls was entrusted in Paris. Its leader, the "King of Ribald" ruled over the prostitution in Paris. The Ribauds were abolished by Philip IV (1285–1314) due to their licentiousness.

=== Occasional repression ===
This general tolerance has exceptions. The very devout Louis IX (the future Saint-Louis), after returning from the Seventh Crusade, sought to make the kingdom conform with his religious views of morality and initially tried to prohibit prostitution. By a Royal Decree of December 1254, he pronounced the expulsion of all "women of evil life" from the kingdom and confiscation of their belongings. It also outlined punishment for prostitutes and pimps. The prostitutes went into hiding and the king was pressured to restore the previous situation. Faced with the impossibility of applying this decree, a second ordinance of 1256 was introduced. Although still railing against women who were "free with their bodies and other common harlots", he acknowledged the pragmatic desirability of housing them away from respectable streets and religious establishments, and so obliged them to reside outside of the borders of the city walls. These measures did nothing to reduce prostitution and the number of prostitutes continued to rise.

In 1269, Louis IX, who was preparing to embark on the Eighth Crusade, again sought to root out evil from the realm. Once again, the clandestine activities of the prostitutes and the disorder created made the king revoke the order. His resolve to do away with prostitution was affirmed in a letter of 1269 to the regents in which he refers to the need to extirpate the evil, root and branch. The punishment for infraction was an 8 sous fine and risking imprisonment in the Châtelet (see below). He designated nine streets in which prostitution would be allowed in Paris (Rue de la Huchette, Rue Froimon, Rue du Renard-Saint-Merri, Rue Taille pain, Rue Brisemiches, Rue Champ-Fleury, Rue Trace-putain, Rue Gratte-cul, and the Rue Tire-Putain) (see below), three of them being in the sarcastically named Beaubourg quartier (Beautiful Neighbourhood).

Today, this area corresponds to the 1st–4th arrondissements clustered on the Rive Droite (right bank) of the Seine (see map). These streets, associated with prostitution, had very evocative if indelicate names including the Rue du Poil-au-con (or hair of the con, from the Latin cunnus meaning female genitalia, hence Street of the Pubic Hair, or Poil du pubis), later altered to the Rue du Pélican, in the 1st arrondissement, near the first Porte Saint-Honoré, and the Rue Tire-Vit (Pull-Cock, i.e. penis, later the Rue Tire-Boudin, Pull-Sausage) now Rue Marie-Stuart, in the 2nd arrondissement, near the first Porte Saint-Denis. It is said that Tire-Boudin was a euphemism invented for Mary Queen of Scots when she asked after its name, and the street is now named after her. The nearby Rue Gratte-Cul (Scratch-bottom) is now the Rue Dussoubs, and the Rue Pute-y-Musse (Whore [who] hides there) the Rue du Petit-Musc by corruption. The "rue Trousse-Nonnain" (fuck nun), later became Trace-Putain, Tasse-Nonnain, and Transnonain; then in 1851 it was amalgamated into the Rue Beaubourg. The Rue Baille-Hoë (Give Joy) is now Rue Taillepain in the 4th arondissement near the Porte Saint-Merri.

In 1358, the Grand Conseil of John II (1350–1364) echoing the "necessary evil" doctrine of Saints Augustine (354–430 AD) and Thomas Aquinas (1225–1274) declared that "les pécheresses sont absolument nécessaires à la Terre" (Sinners are an absolute necessity for the country). Prostitution remained confined to designated areas, as indicated in this decree in the reign of Charles V (1364–1380), by Hugh Aubriot, Provost of Paris in 1367, outlining the areas outside of which prostitutes would be punished 'according to the ordinance of Saint Louis';

Que toutes les femmes prostituées, tenant bordel en la ville de Paris, allassent demeurer et tenir leurs bordels en places et lieux publics à ce ordonnés et accoutumés, selon l'ordonnance de Saint Louis. C'est à savoir : à L'Abreuvoir de Mascon (à l'angle du pont Saint-Michel et de la rue de la Huchette), en La Boucherie (voisine de la rue de la Huchette), rue Froidmentel, près du clos Brunel (à l'est du Collège de France aboutissant au carrefour du Puits-Certain), en Glatigny (rue nommée Val d'Amour dans la Cité), en la Court-Robert de Pris (rue du Renard-Saint-Merri), en Baille-Hoë (près de l'église Saint-Merri et communiquant avec la rue Taille-Pain et à la rue Brise-Miche), en Tyron (rue entre la rue Saint-Antoine et du roi de Sicile), en la rue Chapon (aboutissant rue du Temple) et en Champ-Flory (rue Champ-Fleury, près du Louvre). Si les femmes publiques, d'écris ensuite cette ordonnance, se permettent d'habiter des rues ou quartiers autres que ceux ci-dessus désignés, elles seront emprisonnées au Châtelet puis bannies de Paris. Et les sergents, pour salaire, prendront sur leurs biens huit sous parisis…

Contemporary accounts suggest that this decree was rarely enforced.

Under Charles VI, in an effort to prevent wives and daughters being mistaken as prostitutes, brothels were permitted in designated, segregated areas. Prostitutes were given royal protection from rape, allowing them to refuse clients if they wanted.

In 1446 new rules reinforced the measures being taken by prohibiting the wearing of certain outfits considered to be highly provocative; feather, fur and the infamous gold belts.

== Early modern era ==
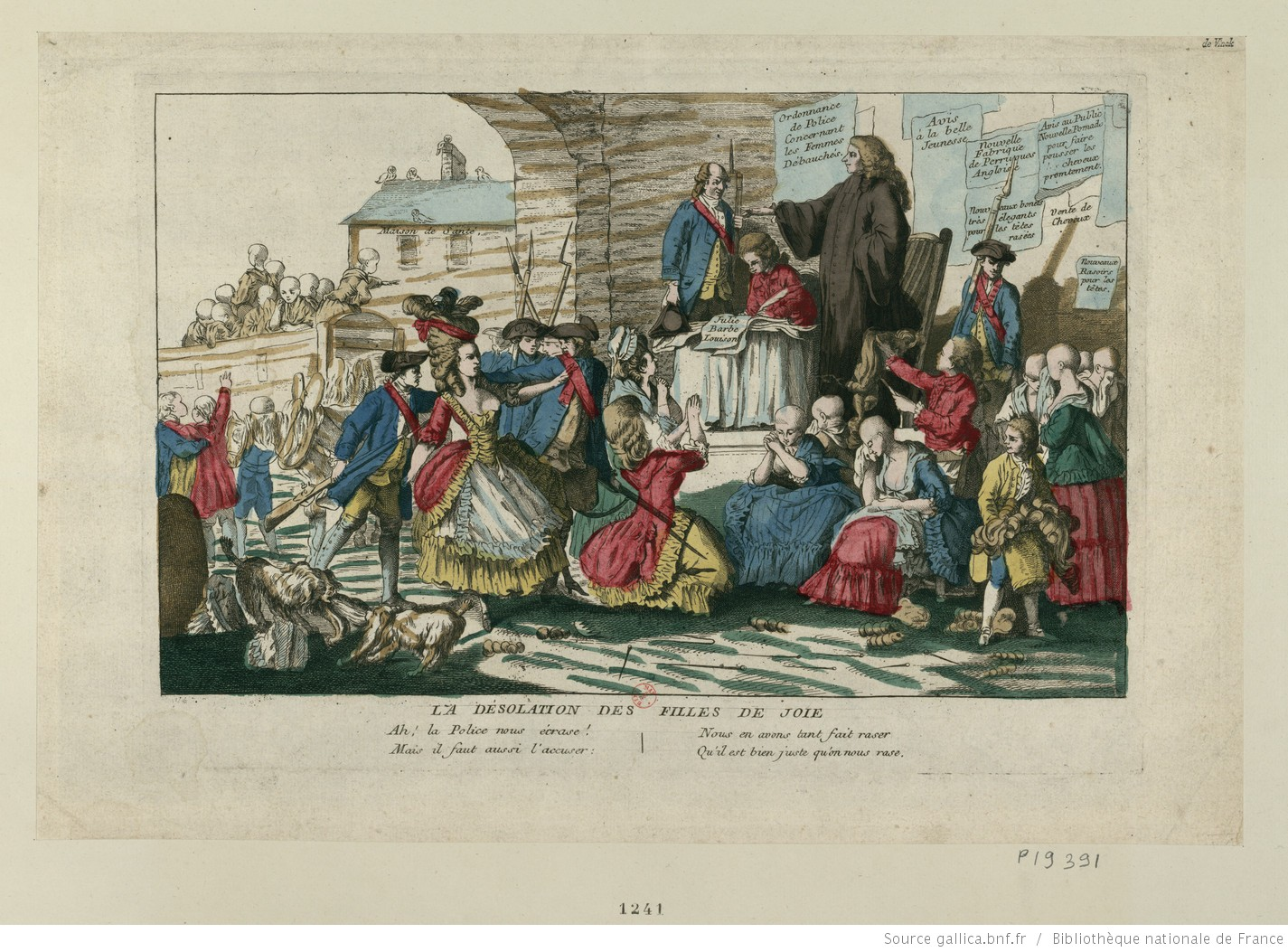
Prostitutes arrested and shorn following the police order of 1778, print by Jean-Baptiste Huet.

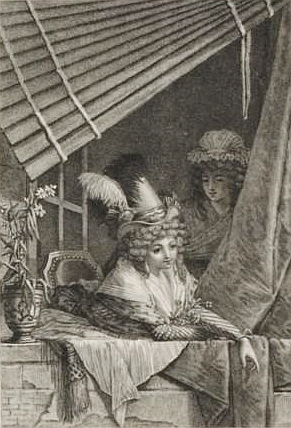
Prostitutes in Paris during the revolutionary period, c. 1793–95. Engraving by Jacques-Louis Copia (1764–1799), after Jean-Baptiste Mallet (1759–1835). Bibliothèque nationale de France

The tolerance period continued in the 15th century, but the 16th century saw a return to repression. Among the factors that may explain this change is the emergence of syphilis in the late 15th century (possibly in Naples in 1494, though recent studies challenge this) and the reformation in Catholic cities returning to more rigid morality.

In 1560, the Edict of Blois made prostitution an illicit activity and a new moral order swept over France. Imprisonment or banishment was applied to those who did not respect the new prohibitions.

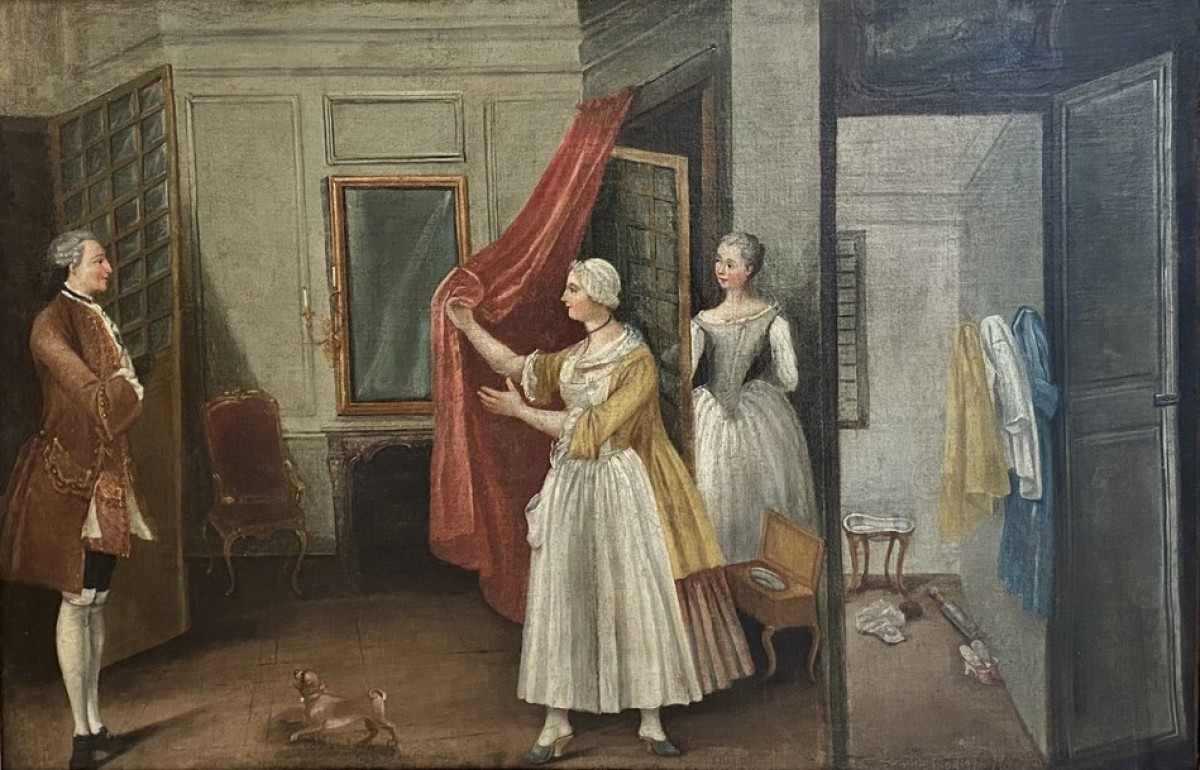
Brothel scene, France, 18th century

Despite these measures the number of prostitutes did not decrease. Thus in 1658, Louis XIV ordered all women guilty of prostitution, fornication, or adultery be imprisoned in the Pitié-Salpêtrière until the priests or religious officials say they have repented and changed. It is also Louis XIV who created, in 1667, the function of lieutenant-general of police, who will be in control of the surveillance of the public girls. In 1687, orders were issued that prostitutes should not be within two leagues of Versailles or in the company of soldiers. Punishment was severe and consisted of cutting off of nose and ears. The women should have their morals be corrected by work and piety.

The police had full power to repress indiscriminately debauchery, prostitution and adultery, but in 1708 and 1713 (Ordinance of July 26, 1713 on "women debauchery" which enshrines the offence of prostitution), the conditions of repression are somewhat formalised (Louis XIV was in the end influenced by devout influences and ended his life of libertinage). Whistle-blowers have to sign their denunciation, and a distinction is made between public debauchery (punished by fine or injunction to leave the premises) and acts of prostitution (banishment or imprisonment). This distinction however, has little effect.

The death of Louis XIV stopped the repression. Louis XV, restored licensing and the morality police were limited to supervising the brothels and transforming the tenants into police auxiliaries. The advent of Louis XVI signalled the return of repression. On November 6, 1778, an order of police lieutenant Lenoir prohibited solicitation in all its forms. Every month, three or four hundred women were arrested in Paris. Those who could buy their freedom were freed, others are put in hospital or in prison.

After the French Revolution, the revolutionaries removed prostitution from the domain of the law, refusing to make it a matter of legislation. In a break with the proliferation of the previous royal ordinances and their prohibitionist approach, the revolutionaries established, by absence in the main codes of law in 1791, the tolerance of this activity. Only the surveillance of places of prostitution is prescribed by the Code of Police and procuring minors is punishable by the Penal Code in the name of the violation of morality, a legal category created by revolutionaries. The practice of prostitution itself is not outlawed.

On October 4, 1793, the Commune of Paris issued a regulatory order forbidding prostitutes to stand in public spaces to "incite to debauchery". Although it led to the arrest and sanitary control of more than 400 prostitutes in 1794, this decree did not prevent the continued development of prostitution, particularly at the Palais-Royal, which became the first sex market in the capital. There were many "daughters" that crisscrossed the garden paths and galleries of the Palace, and erotic shows and shops dedicated to prostitution.

At the turn of the century, the authorities estimated that there were 30,000 prostitutes in Paris alone, plus an additional 10,000 high-class prostitutes. To measure the extent of the phenomenon, most contemporary historians point out that if the proportion of prostitutes was the same today (about 13% of women), Paris would have a population of more than 100,000 prostitutes.

== Contemporary era ==
=== Official tolerance ===
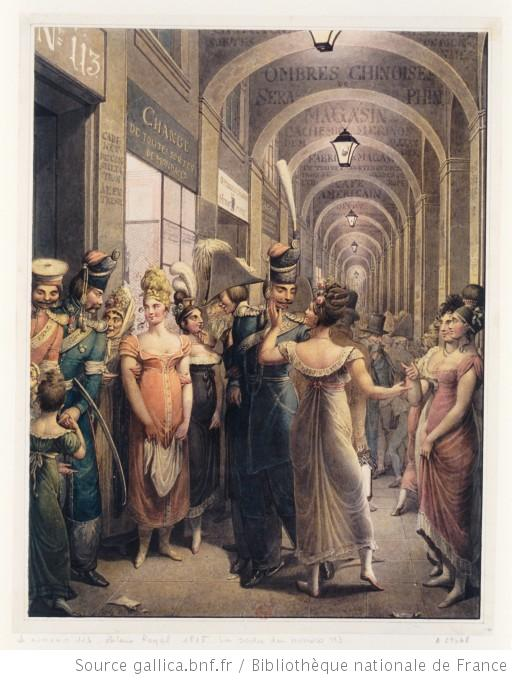
Prostitution at the Palais Royal in 1815 (Opiz).

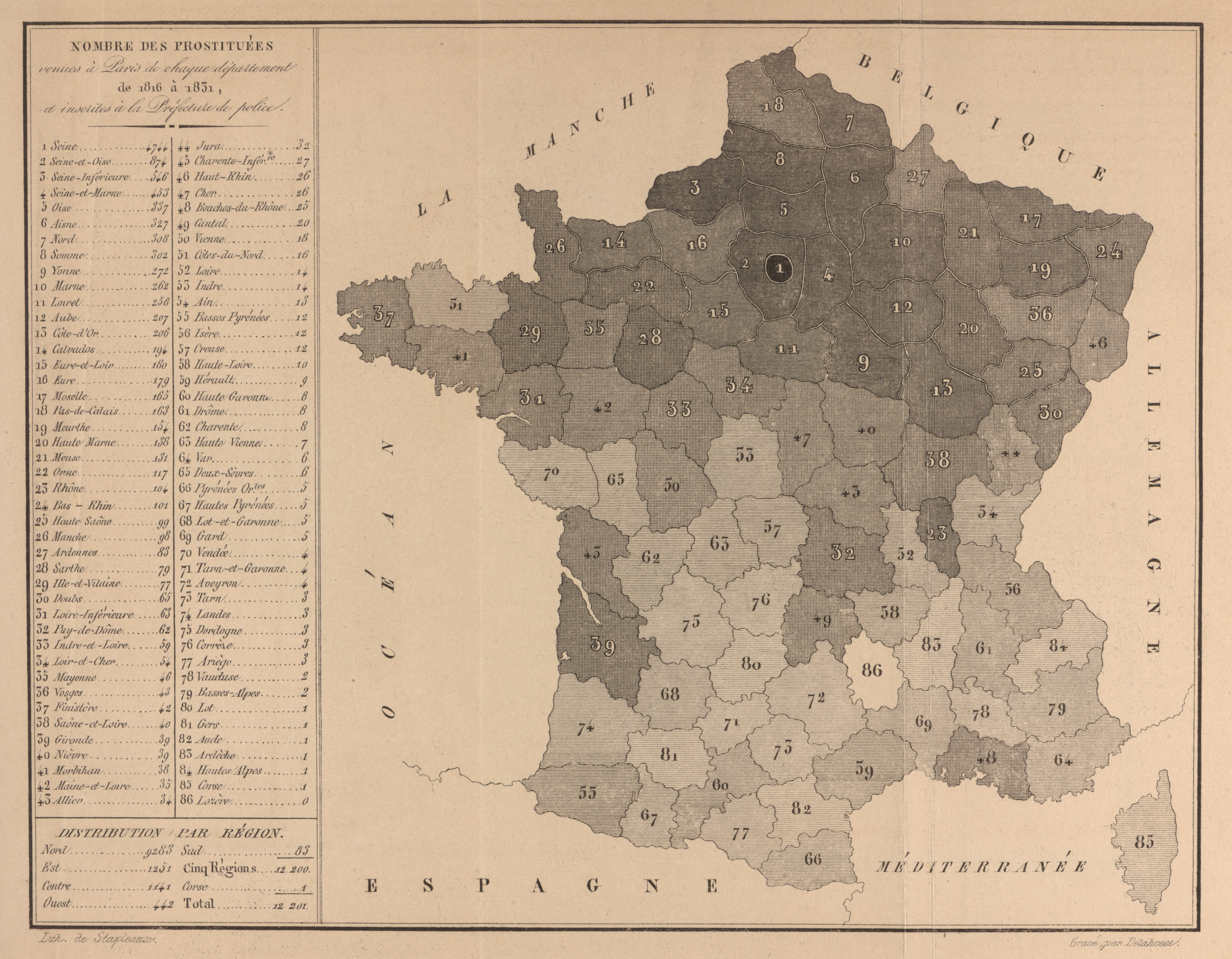
Map of France: the origin of prostitutes in Paris, published by Alexandre Parent du Chatelet in 1836 in a book entitled De la Prostitution dans la ville de Paris, considérée sous le rapport de l’hygiène publique, de la morale et de l’administration (1836)

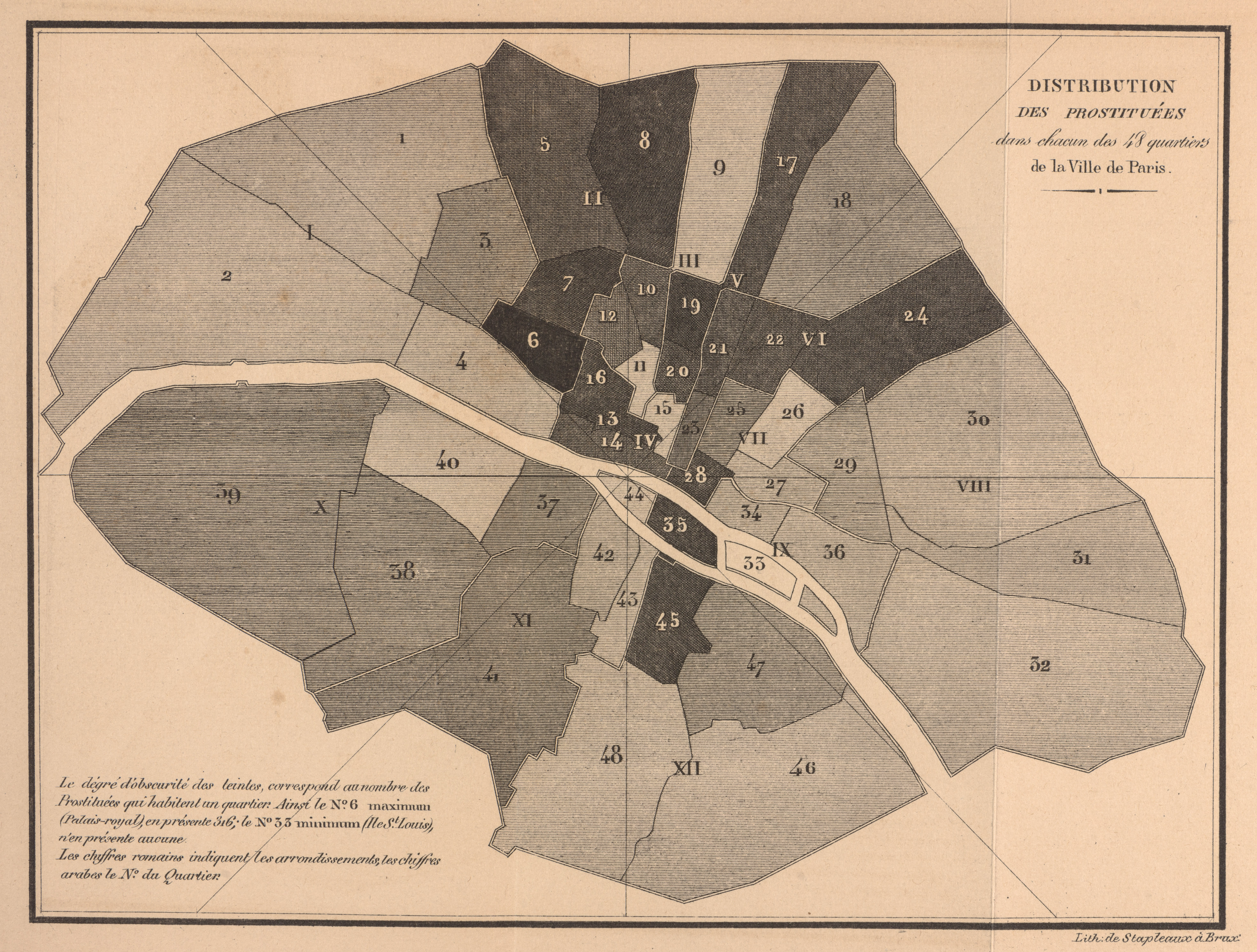
Map of prostitutes in Paris, published by Alexandre Parent du Châtelet in his book De la Prostitution dans la ville de Paris, considérée sous le rapport de l’hygiène publique, de la morale et de l’administration (1836)

Henri de Toulouse-Lautrec, Salon de la rue des Moulins, 1894

Decriminalized during the French Revolution, prostitution was not accepted by French society. In Paris, in the name of the preservation of public order, the police continue to arrest women who prostitute themselves on public roads. By a decree of October 4, 1793, the Commune makes the "raccrochage" in public space a crime against morality and establishes the principle of health control of prostitutes. In 1796, an attempt by the Directorate to fight prostitution by making it an offence fails in the face of the difficulty of defining prostitution. MP Joseph Vincent Dumolard, a moderate deputy, explains that "It is not to the legislators of a great people that we must present regulations of monks. The abuses denounced (...) are all too true, the disorders are all too real, but perhaps they are inseparable from the existence of a commune such as the one we inhabit." After this failure, the Central Office of the Canton of Paris, ancestor of the Prefecture of Police, inaugurates the principles of registration and census of prostitutes in the capital.

The Consulate (1799–1804) continued the tolerance and paves the way for maisons de tolérance. A Decree of 3 March 1802 legislates mandatory health inspection prostitutes in an attempt to stem the spread of syphilis, which was endemic at the time. On Napoleon's order of October 12, 1804, the prefect of police in Paris, Louis Dubois, prescribed the official organisation of the houses of pleasures. The year 1804 saw the legalisation of tolerance and brothels. Women and houses are controlled by the Brigade des mœurs.

The women had to register at the prefecture in order to work in a brothel. Each woman had to have a twice-weekly medical check-up, which is perceived as the most degrading part of their job and abhorred by the prostitutes. In April 1831, 3,131 girls registered at the Paris Prefecture.

The women received a registration card, and the brothels a registration number. Prostitutes recognised by the state were said to be "soumises", as opposed to those working clandestinely, known as "insoumises", who were punished. This regulation lasted until the closing of brothels in 1946 by the Loi Marthe Richard. Soliciting was prohibited and the women were confined to registered brothels. It was at this time that Alexandre Parent-Duchâtelet published De la prostitution dans la ville de Paris (Prostitution in the City of Paris), in which he noted the misery of prostitutes, which he estimated to be 10,000 in Paris, and the poor functioning of medical control.

The Third Republic was the golden age of brothels, and they were accepted as part of social life. The state, and especially the tax authorities, benefited from this trade by taking 50 to 60 per cent of profits. This is the era of famous houses, such as Le Chabanais and Le Sphinx, whose reputation is known internationally. In Paris there were about 200 official establishments in the middle of the century, under the control of the police and doctors. This fell to about sixty at the end of the century as a result of the multiplication of illegal brothels which were then employing 15,000 prostitutes. From approximately 1871 to 1903, the writer Maxime Du Camp counted 155,000 women officially registered as prostitutes, but during the same period, the police stopped 725,000 others for clandestine prostitution.

The prostitute, on the other hand, was reduced to a status of sub-citizen, subject to regulations whose application is left mostly in the hands of corrupt police officials. A series of scandals lead to the dissolution of the Brigade des mœurs in 1881 (although it was reformed in 1901). In 1911, the police prefect Lépine authorises "houses of rendezvous" where prostitutes do not live, but where they come only to work. These include cafes with "waitresses", 115 of which opened in Paris that year. Other houses of rendezvous included perfumeries and bathing and massage premises. The police estimated that 40,000 clients a day frequented the various houses, which would be equivalent to saying that a quarter of Paris men had relations with prostitutes.

Historian Charles Virmaître was particularly interested in Paris, its sexual mores, prostitution, brothels, and the various regulations and penalties. Many books deal with these themes: Les virtuoses du trottoir (1868), Les maisons comiques; détails intimes et inédits de la vie de célébrités artistiques (1868), Paris-police (1886), Paris impur (1889), Paris-galant (1890), Paris cocu (1890), Paris documentaire : Trottoirs et lupanars (1893).

The traditional brothel, inherited from the brothels of the 19th century, underwent two major changes from around 1920. The prostitutes tended not to live in the brothels, under the changed regulations, the brothel was to occupy an entire building and the girls were boarders in order to contain prostitution. In the 1920s, in the face of real estate pressure, regulations allowed girls to become increasingly free to live outside. Secondly the hygiene requirements became increasingly important.

=== Appearance of the abolitionist movement in France ===
The abolitionist movement, born of the opposition to the "French-style" regulation in the United Kingdom, started to develop in France at the end of the 19th century. Most notably because of the campaign of opinion initiated by Josephine Butler. The French section of the International Abolitionist Federation was founded in 1926 under the name of the Union contre le trafic des êtres humains (Union against Trafficking in Human Beings) by feminist Marcelle Legrand-Falco. France had approved the International Agreement for the suppression of the White Slave Traffic in 1912, which had been one of the international achievements of the abolitionist movement. In 1925, brothels were closed in Bas-Rhin the prefect of police.

=== World War I ===
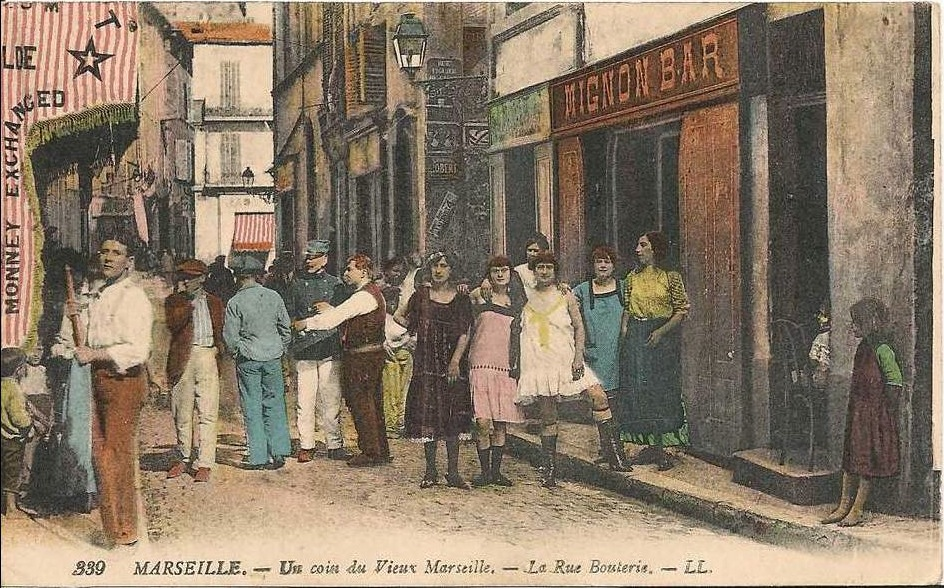
A group of filles de joie in Marseille, 1919

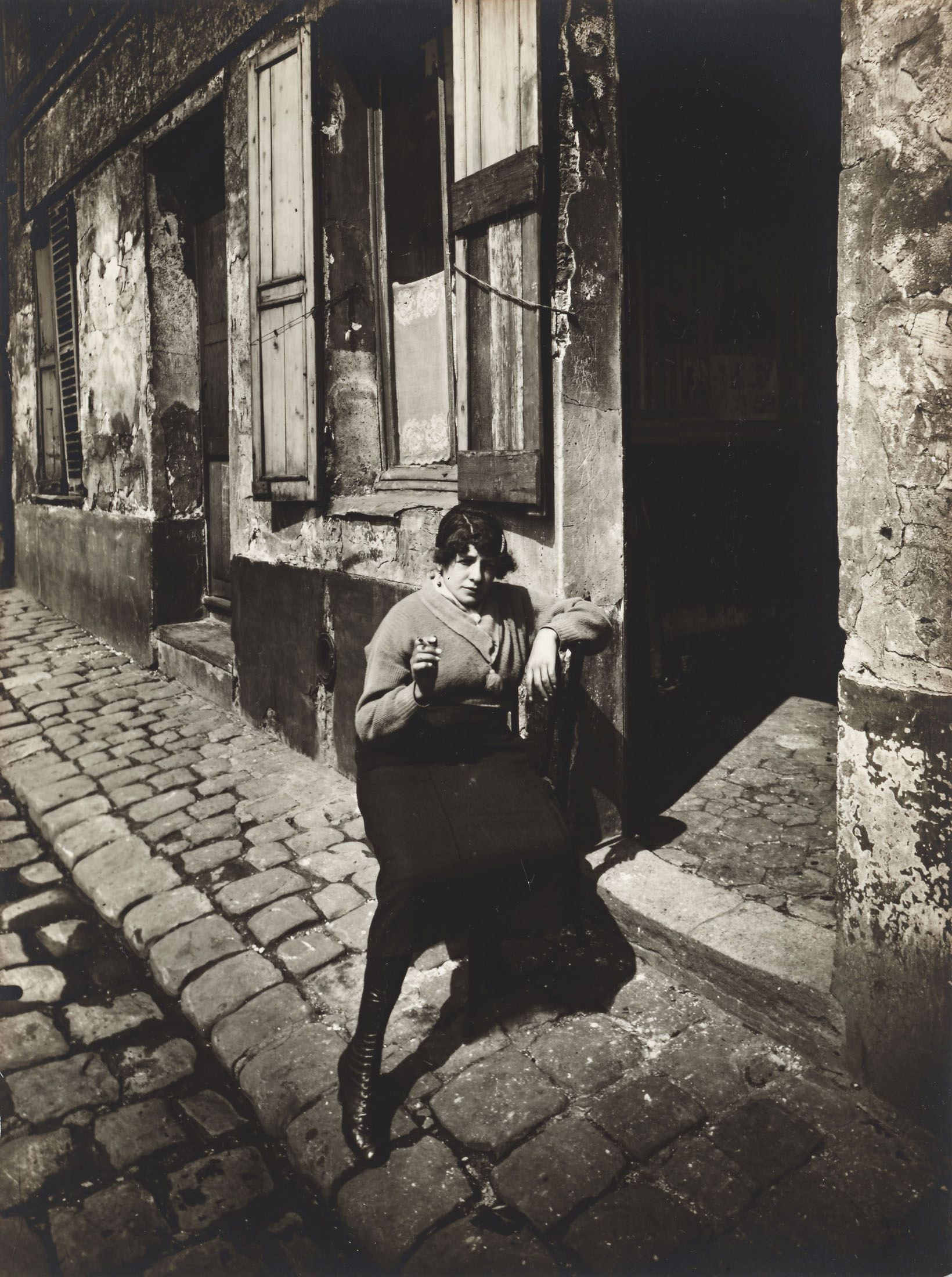
Paris, district of Villette, "public girl in the quarter"; photograph by Eugene Atget, 1921.

During World War I, in Paris alone, US Army officials estimated that there were 40 major brothels, 5,000 professionally licensed streetwalkers, and another 70,000 unlicensed prostitutes. By 1917, there were at least 137 such establishments across 35 towns on or close to the Western front. Many were operated by the French authorities in an attempt to control STIs. Some of the prostitutes were recruited from the French colonies in North Africa. Brothels that had a high incidence of infections were closed.

The British Army adopted local codes of ethics when fighting in another country, and so allowed troops on rest periods and days off to visit what became termed maisons tolérées. Such activity was not just tolerated but encouraged for both the young, as well as the married men who were missing their wives. As the war advanced, so did the need and rank of the prostitutes entertained. While British troops paid just six pence per day were often found in the lowest priced institutes, dominion soldiers from Australia, New Zealand, and Canada received six shillings and could afford higher-class "services". British officers preferred to "always indulge with armour (condoms)" and took to patronizing German Army officers' former prostitutes when the lines of conflict were advancing towards the end of the war, with the advantage that they sometimes gained tactical and strategic information as well.

It is unknown how many or what percentage of men visited the institutions, but the French army recorded over a million cases of gonorrhea and syphilis during the war. In 1915, in Le Havre, a survey undertaken by the Royal Army Medical Corps counted 171,000 uniformed British Army visitors to the brothels in just one street. As a result, rates of venereal disease began to climb, with 23,000 British Army men at any time on average during the second half of the campaign hospitalized for treatment, with over 150,000 British soldiers having been infected by the end of the war. The disease at the time had a high social stigma, but a particularly bad infection could get a soldier medically discharged from frontline duty, even on a temporary basis. Syphilis was treated with injections of mercury, administered at a hospital over a 30-day period, thereby guaranteeing escape from the frontline. The result was that some prostitutes with particularly bad STI infections could charge more. Every British army unit had a sexually transmitted disease clinic, where soldiers could gain an ointment consisting of mercury and chlorine to prevent STI infection, or receive a urethral irrigation with potassium permanganate after STI exposure.

The US Army attitude was different, driven by a reformist attitude at home. In October 1917, Secretary of War Newton D. Baker said:

These boys are going to France. I want them adequately armed and clothed by their government; but I want them to have an invisible armor to take with them . . . a moral and intellectual armor for their protection overseas.

Aided by the American Social Hygiene Organization, he closed so called segregated zones close to Army training camps, which included closing the notorious Storyville district in New Orleans. When the two million soldiers of the American Expeditionary Force had been deployed to France, they were guided by a bulletin from AEF commander Gen. John Pershing to just say no:

Sexual continence is the plain duty of members of the AEF, both for the vigorous conduct of the war, and for the clean health of the American people after the war.

This was backed up by additional posters and pamphlets that read "You wouldn't use another fellow's tooth-brush, so why use his whore?" and "A Soldier Who Gets a Dose Is a Traitor!" The US Army had clear instructions on those who did not follow the no indulgence rule. US Army regulations required soldiers who admitted to having sex while on leave to submit to chemical prophylaxis, that included irrigating the penis. Soldiers who did not report for prophylaxis and later contracted STIs were subject to court-martial and possibly a hard-labor sentence, while those who contracted disease after treatment only lost pay during treatment. Implemented from the first day of training, the initiative was so successful that US Army doctors reported that 96% of the cases they treated had been contracted while the soldier was still a civilian.

However, on debarkation at the designated port of St. Nazaire, a dispute with French authorities broke out, after the AEF placed the Maisons Tolérée off limits. With the dispute escalating, President Georges Clemenceau sent a memo to Gen. Pershing offering a compromise: American medical authorities would control designated brothels operated solely for American soldiers. Pershing passed the proposal to Raymond Fosdick, who gave it to Secretary Baker. Upon receiving it, Baker responded: "For God's sake, Raymond, don't show this to the president or he'll stop the war." The French later proposed a deal that targeted the Black American troops, most of whom were assigned to unloading freight in segregated stevedore battalions, again flatly turned down by US authorities. But this merely highlighted US differential racial policy, as all black troops were required by US Army regulations to undertake prophylaxis when returning from leave, whether or not they acknowledged sexual contact.

The policy adopted by the US Army worked, with far lower rates of STIs across their troops compared to French or British and Dominion combatants. However, after the signing of the Armistice, when the US Army could no longer plead military necessity as grounds for curtailing leave, STI rates among US Army troops shot up.

=== World War II ===
During the German occupation, the Wehrmacht promoted and organised a system of prostitution to avoid problems caused by relationships with women carrying venereal diseases or abuse. Brothels were controlled and classified, some reserved for officers and the Gestapo, others for enlisted soldiers. Soldiers and prostitutes were regularly monitored to prevent problems.

During World War II, Dr Edith Sumerskill raised the issue of Maisons Tolérées in Parliament to Secretary of State for War Anthony Eden after the intervention of the British Expeditionary Force. Further questions were raised in Parliament after the D-Day invasion, to ensure such local practises and medical precautions were continued.

After liberation, US soldiers encouraged by the propaganda of the US military, including via his newspaper Stars and Stripes, engaged in an uncontrollable debauchery. For the American soldier, France "is a huge mess in which live 40 million hedonists who spend their time eating, drinking and making love" according to Joe Weston, a journalist for Life. Propaganda largely conveying this image was aimed to encourage recruits to join the army. Persuaded that the French are a people of depraved, the soldiers seek prostitutes and promotes prostitution. In some cities such as Le Havre, one of the places the US Army arrives in France, public places are filled with soldiers seeking a relationship or practising it in plain view. French women also contributed to prostitution to support themselves. Poverty drives many girls to engage in it. Prostitution was out of control, the French authorities lack resources and the US military oscillates between an official regulation (organising brothels near military camps, followed in prophylactic stations to limit venereal diseases) and an informal indifference which promotes the spread of venereal disease and lack of control of the soldiers.

This difficult period led towards the prohibition of prostitution, especially towards the owners of brothels, who were accused of collaboration with the Nazi occupiers.

=== The end of brothels ===
At the end of the Second World War, there were 1,500 officially recognised brothels in France, including 177 in Paris.

Although France was the country of origin of regulationism, there were frequent proposals for the abolition of brothels (1903, 1920, 1930, 1931 and 1936). With public opinion against brothel owners due to accusations of collaboration during the German occupation, Marthe Richard revived the process in 1945. The Loi Marthe Richard closes brothels and provides for the creation of prevention and social rehabilitation services (SPRS) in large French cities.

The law allowed brothels six months to close, the closure coming in to force on November 6, 1946. Although the law provided for reception and reeducation centres to help prostitutes to exit the industry, there was not enough budget allowed to set up the centres, so 40,000 "subjects" were found in the street. They join the "insoumises" or move to the colonies (which are not subject to the new law) or to European countries to exercise their trade. A minority started work in factories or cafes. The brothel owners open clandestine establishments, known as clandés, especially in big cities and around US and French military barracks. The brigades des mœurs, with the green light of the prefecture, practised a forced tolerance. Freed from police supervision, prostitution multiplies: in 1953, the lowest estimates were of 40,000 prostitutes in Paris (the highest being 70,000), while there are nearly 500 clandestine brothels, a number which was increasing.

However, the Loi Marthe Richard did not apply in the colonies, which is one of the reasons France did not sign the UN Convention for the Suppression of the Traffic in Persons and of the Exploitation of the Prostitution of Others until 1960. Indeed, the colonial authorities consider it necessary to maintain brothels around the colonial troops, and thus organise this prostitution.

Active solicitation was also outlawed in the late 1940s. Passive solicitation (being present with revealing clothes at locations known for prostitution) was outlawed in 2003 as part of a package of law-and-order measures by then-interior minister, Nicolas Sarkozy, in his "Domestic Security Bill" (loi pour la sécurité intérieure 2003, or LSI also known as Loi Sarkozy II), and had the effect of reducing the visibility of prostitution on the streets. Prostitutes' organizations decried the measure, which came into force in March 2003, calling it punitive and fated to increase the power of pimps. Many prostitutes started to work out of vans, a strategy authorities attempted to combat by using parking regulation enforcement.

=== Prostitutes activism ===
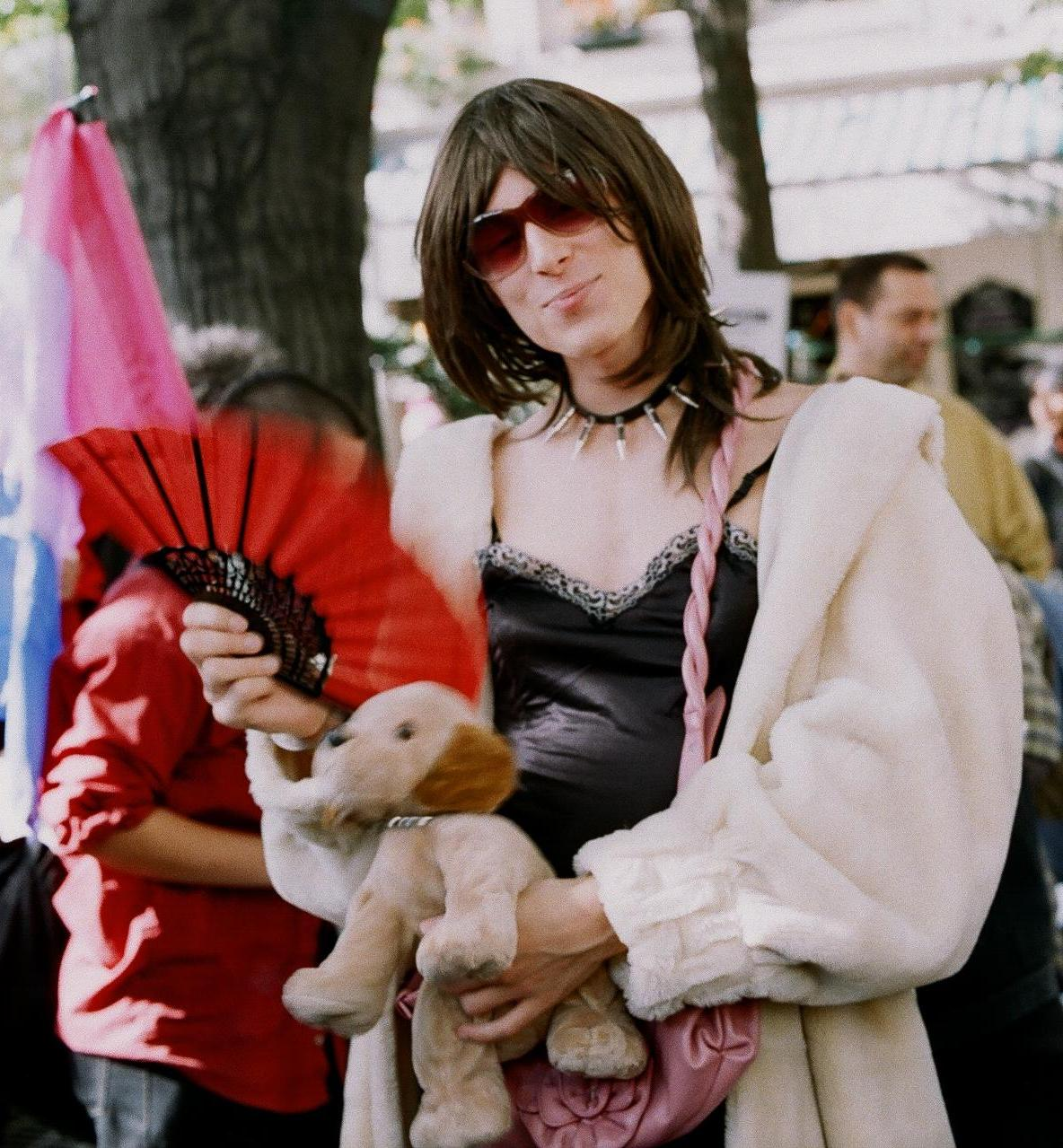
Demonstration by prostitutes in Paris, France, in October 2005.

In August 1973, Jacqueline Treppler created an association of prostitutes, Les petites sœurs des cœurs (Little Sisters of Hearts), which proposed the creation of a chain of Eros centres, based on the German model, to decriminalize the profession. She also calls for a tax on prostitution. She received the support of Martha Richard, whose battle led the closure of brothels, who was in favour of a revision of "her" law".

In June 1975, after roundups, closures of love hotels, and repressions of all kinds by the police, prostitutes, who claimed to work without pimps, complained of not being able to exercise their profession. On June 2, 1975, a hundred prostitutes from Lyon occupied the church Saint-Nizier in protest. This precipitated the occupation of other churches in Montpellier, Toulouse, Cannes, and the Chapel of Saint Bernard de Montparnasse in Paris on June 7, by over 500 prostitutes who demand recognition of their rights. Grisélidis Réal is one of the leaders of this movement that demands a recognised status for prostitutes, social security, the end of police repression, and opposes the reopening of brothels.

In the 21st century, the fight against pimps has grown and caused the closure of many brothels. A law for internal security known as the Sarkozy law, whose article 225-10-1 was aimed at soliciting and was promulgated on March 19, 2003, provoking the appearance of a second movement of prostitutes in 2002. Since 2006, the Pute Pride has been held every year in Paris as a pride march for sex workers.

Some sex workers in France are not in favour of binding legislation such as brothels, which do not allow them to retain the choice of their customers, practices, schedules, prevention, etc. Sex workers, gathered in Assisi on 16 March 2007, concluded unanimously that they will "march for the defence of our rights".

In November 2007, prostitutes and their allies continued to protest the repression of soliciting by gathering before the Senate and protest for their rights.

Soliciting on the street became more and more repressed and dangerous. As a result, some prostitutes started to establish contacts on the Internet in 2008.

On March 20, 2009, at the end of the European Conference on Prostitution held at the Théâtre de l'Odéon, the STRASS (Syndicat du Travail Sexuel) was born. Since its creation, this union has received the support of at least 200 members and created 5 federations at the national level, as well as a representation in Great Britain.

=== Law to penalise the clients of prostitution ===
In April 2011, a parliamentary commission report ("En finir avec le mythe du plus vieux métier du monde") recommended the adoption of the Swedish approach of criminalizing the purchase of sex. The social affairs minister, Roselyne Bachelot, supported the proposal, stating, "There is no such thing as freely chosen and consenting prostitution. The sale of sexual acts means women's bodies are made available for men, independently of the wishes of those women." Other support came from Mouvement du Nid. The French sex worker movement STRASS has condemned the proposals.

In October and November 2013, French lawmakers began debating a proposal to punish customers of prostitution. On December 4, the National Assembly passed a bill fining customers of prostitutes by 268 votes to 138, with 79 abstaining, which would impose fines of at least €1500 on clients caught paying for sexual relations. Within the National Assembly, most of those who supported the bill were MPs from the Socialist Party, which dominates the house. The law was passed in the National Assembly on December 4, 2013. The bill caused considerable controversy in France among politicians and intellectuals, some for legalizing prostitution, and others wanting it banned. The bill was opposed by many sex workers, and was rejected by the French Senate in July 2014.

Finally, on 6 April 2016, the French National Assembly voted to fine customers of prostitutes €1500.

== Bibliography ==
- Allinne, Jean-Pierre (2004). Gouverner le crime: Les politiques criminelles françaises de la révolution au XXIème siècle - Tome 2 - Le temps des doutes 1920-2004 (in French). Editions L'Harmattan. ISBN 9782296369917.
- Barbès, Violette de (1980). Cinquante ans de trottoir (in French). Alain Lefeuvre.
- Benabou, Erica-Marie (1987). "La prostitution et la police des moeurs au XVIIIe siècle". Annales (in French). 42 (5): 1147–1149.
- Du Camp, Maxime (1872). "XVII: De l'état actuel de la prostitution parisienne". Paris, ses organes, ses fonctions et sa vie dans la seconde moitié du XIXe siècle (in French). Hachette et cie.
- Carrez, Jean-Pierre (2008). "La Salpêtrière de Paris sous l'Ancien Régime : lieu d'exclusion et de punition pour femmes". Criminocorpus. Revue d'Histoire de la Justice, des Crimes et des Peines (in French). doi:10.4000/criminocorpus.264. S2CID 191031355.
- Caviness, Madeline H. (October 1990). "Reviews of Les Vitraux Légendaires de Chartres: Des Récits en Images . Jean-Paul Deremble, Colette Manhes & Sermo Corporeus: Die Erzählung der Mittelalterlichen Glasfenster . Wolfgang Kemp". Speculum. 65 (4): 972–975. doi:10.2307/2863588. JSTOR 2863588.
- Chauvin, Charles (1983). Les chrétiens et la prostitution (in French). Editions du Cerf. ISBN 978-2204019323.
- Coquart, Elizabeth; Huet, Philippe (2000). Le livre noir de la prostitution (in French). Albin Michel. ISBN 9782226115737.
- Effinger, John R. (1908). Women of the Romance Countries. Library of Alexandria. ISBN 9781465577481.
- Français du Maroc (August 1954). "Prostitution à Casablanca dans les années 1950: complicité de fonctionnaires français". Esprit: 268–271.
- Houssin, Monique; Tovar, Madia (1991). Européennes: quelles femmes? (in French). Messidor. ISBN 9782209065233.
- Isambert; Decrusy; Taillandier (1830). Des Anciennes Lois Françaises Vol XX (in French). Berlin-Le-Prieur.
- Jouffa, François; Crawley, Tony (2003). L'Âge d'or du cinéma érotique: et pornographique 1973-1976 (in French). Ramsay. ISBN 9782841146772.
- Lecour, Charles Jerome (2008). La Prostitution an Paris Et an Londres, 1789-1870 (in French). BiblioBazaar. ISBN 9780559331862.
- Lemonier, Marc (2015). Guide historique du Paris libertin (in French). Groupe CB. ISBN 9782842716707.
- Massignon, Louis (September 1953). "Le Coran condamne le proxénétisme. La Colonisation européenne a encouragé le développement de la prostitution en terre d'Islam". Esprit (in French): 381–384.
- Mossuz-Lavau, Janine (2015). La prostitution (in French). Dalloz. ISBN 9782247139323.
- Pacaud, Serge (2007). La prostitution à Bordeaux: au temps de la tolérance (in French). Atlantica. ISBN 9782843948442.
- Parent-Duchâtelet, Alexandre Jean B. (1857). De la prostitution dans la ville de Paris (in French). J.B. Baillière et fils.
- Plumauzille, Clyde (1 December 2013). "Le "marché aux putains" : économies sexuelles et dynamiques spatiales du Palais-Royal dans le Paris révolutionnaire". Genre, Sexualité & Société (in French) (10). doi:10.4000/gss.2943. ISSN 2104-3736.
- Plumauzille, Clyde (2014). "Du " scandale de la prostitution " à l'" atteinte contre les bonnes mœurs " Contrôle policier et administration des filles publiques sous la Révolution française". Politix (107): 9–31. doi:10.3917/pox.107.0007.
- Plumauzille, Clyde (2016). Prostitution et Révolution: Les Femmes publiques dans la cité républicaine (1789-1804) (in French). Champ Vallon. ISBN 9791026700678.
- Régis Révenin, Homosexuality and male prostitution in Paris: 1870–1918, Paris, L'Harmattan, 2005 ( ISBN 978-2-7475-8639-9 )
- Richard-Molard, Georges (1976). Avec les prostituées: l'enjeu d'un combat (in French). Chalet. ISBN 9782702302781.
- Robb, Graham (2010). Parisians: An Adventure History of Paris. W. W. Norton & Company. ISBN 9780393067248.
- Roberts, Mary Louise (2013). What Soldiers Do: Sex and the American GI in World War II France. University of Chicago Press. ISBN 9780226923093.
- Roger, Nadine (July 1995). "Soldats et prostituées: un couple indissociable dans la société de Louis XIV". Population (French Edition) (in French). 50 (4/5): 1267. doi:10.2307/1534340. JSTOR 1534340.
- Rossiaud, Jacques (1995). Medieval Prostitution. Wiley. ISBN 9780631199922.
- Scibelli, Pasqua (1987). "Empowering prostitutes: A proposal for international legal reform". Harvard Women's Law Journal. 10: 117–157.
- Shadwell, Arthur (1911). "Prostitution" . In Chisholm, Hugh (ed.). Encyclopædia Britannica. Vol. 22 (11th ed.). Cambridge University Press.
- Teyssier, Paul (2010). Maisons closes parisiennes: architectures immorales des années 1930 (in French). Parigramme. ISBN 9782840966043.
- Toulalan, Sarah; Fisher, Kate (2013). The Routledge History of Sex and the Body: 1500 to the Present. Routledge. ISBN 9780415472371.
