= Palais Oriental (Reims) =

Brothel in Reims, France (1926–1946)

- PO
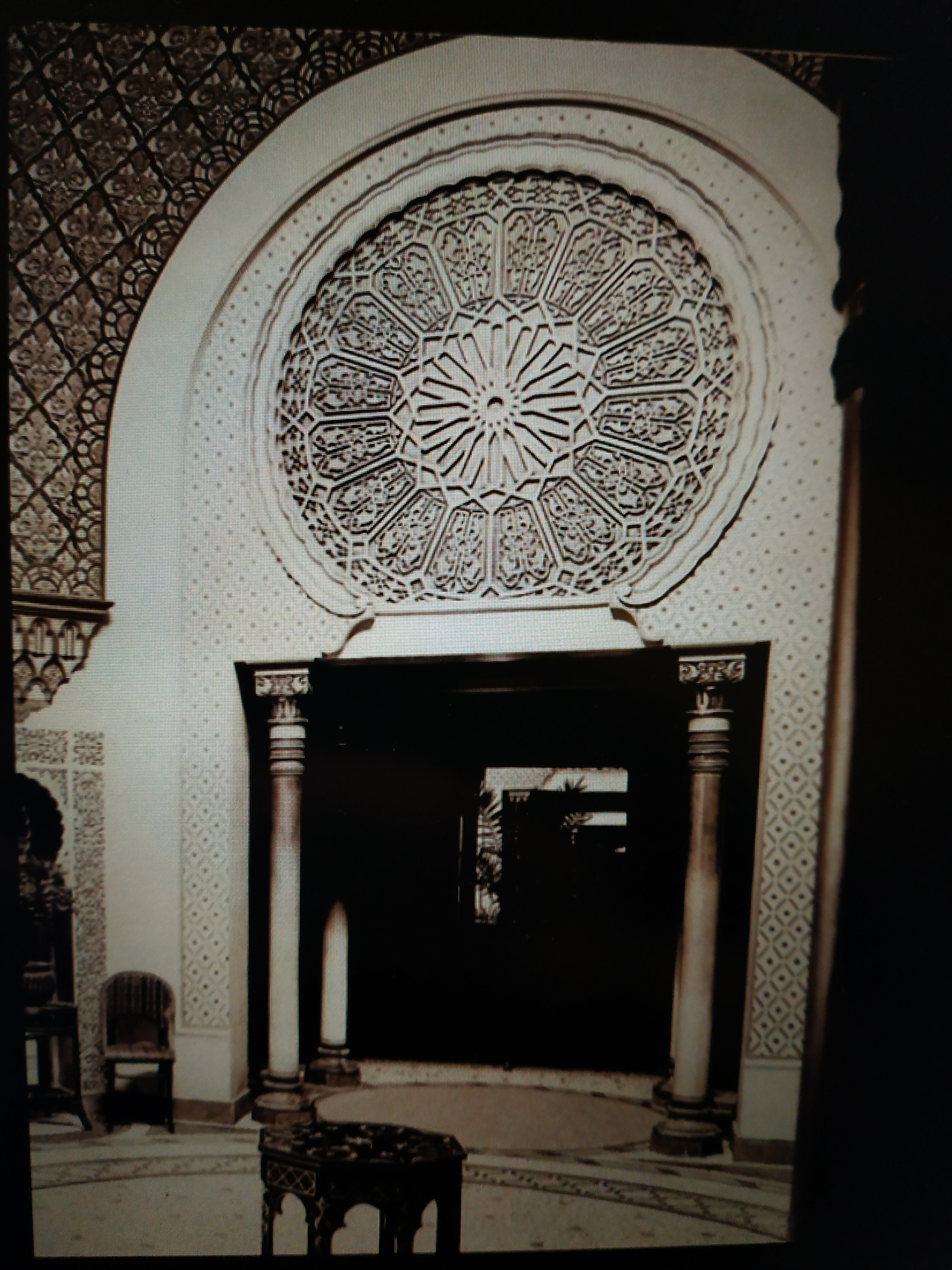
- Ottoman Gate in the Palais Oriental

- Location in France
- Address: Rue de la Magdeleine
- Location: Reims
- Coordinates: 49.2525407°N 4.02109°E
- Type: Maison close

Construction
- Opened: 15 April 1925
- Closed: 30 September 1946

The Palais Oriental, known locally as the PO, was a luxury maison close (brothel) in Reims, France. It opened in 1926 and closed in 1946, following the introduction of the Loi Marthe Richard, which abolished brothels in France. It was located on the corner of the rue de la Magdeleine and rue Bacquenoi. The prestige of the Palais Oriental rivalled that of Paris's most luxurious maison closes, the One-Two-Two and Le Chabanais.

== Overview ==
Work on the Palais Oriental started in 1924 and the establishment first opened its doors on 15 April 1925. Like many other French brothels of the time it had an Oriental theme. The building itself drew heavily from Moorish architecture, looking like an Arab fortress, and the interior was adorned with mosaics and hand-painted frescos.

On the ground floor was the main reception room. This was open to the public with no obligation to use the other services of the brothel. Cabaret shows were produced for the entertainment of patrons. The room had a well stocked 25m bar. It is reputed that the patrons consumed more Champagne here than in the rest of the bars and restaurants in Reims combined. Also on the ground floor was a Moorish lounge where the 30 or so women, known as petits cœurs à louer (little hearts for rent), awaited clients. A grand staircase took the women and clients up to the 7 small salons, each one having a different oriental theme. Amongst the clients were politicians, Princes, Maharajas, and celebrities of the day.

After WW2, following campaigning by ex-prostitute Marthe Richard, a law was passed outlawing brothels in France. As a consequence of this, the Palais Oriental closed on 30 September 1946. The building was demolished and a garage built on the site.

== Legacy ==
The only surviving parts of the brothel building are a floor mosaic and a small back door.

In 2009, researcher Nicole Canet published Maisons closes, 1860-1946: bordels de femmes, bordels d'hommes, of the brothels featured in the book, the Palais Oriental was the only one outside Paris.

Historical author Michelle Andrée Roy wrote a book, Chronique d'une maison close: le palais oriental, about the brothel in 2013.

== Bibliography ==
- Canet, Nicole (2009). Maisons closes, 1860-1946: bordels de femmes, bordels d'hommes. Eds. Nicole Canet. ISBN 9782953235104.
- Dupouy, Alexandre (2019). City of Pleasure: Paris Between the Wars. Korero Press. ISBN 9781912740055.
- Maginn, Paul J.; Steinmetz, Christine (2014). (Sub)Urban Sexscapes: Geographies and Regulation of the Sex Industry. Routledge. ISBN 9781135008321.
- Mankoff, Allan H. (1972). Mankoff's lusty Europe: the first all-purpose European guide to sex, love and romance. Viking Press. ISBN 9780670452910. "palais oriental reims."
- Roy, Michelle Andrée (2013). Chronique d'une maison close: le palais oriental : roman (in French). Thélès. ISBN 9782303005128.
