= Love chair =

Chair made for Edward VII

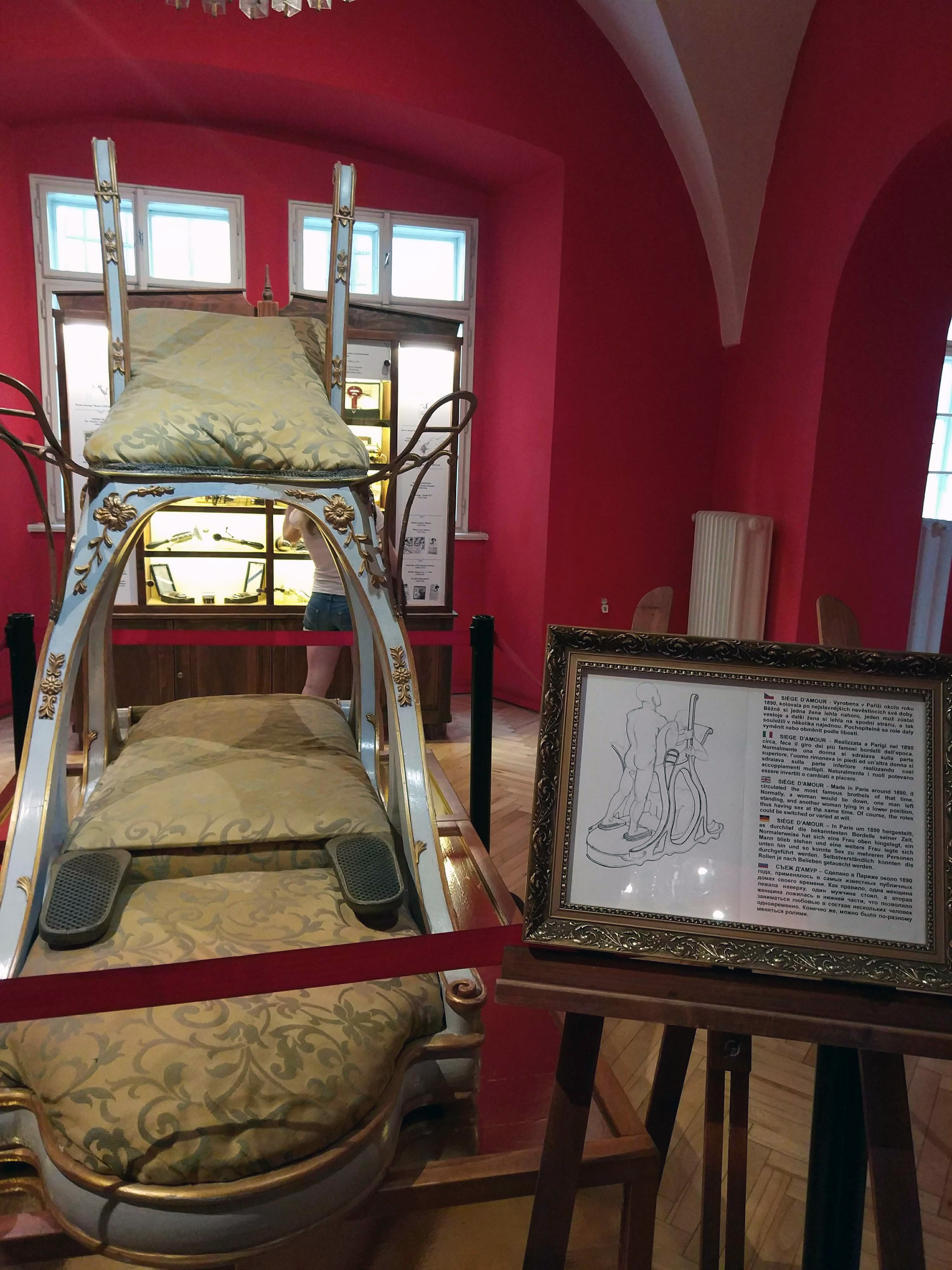
Similar piece now in Prague

The love chair (French: siège d'amour) is a device created by French furniture manufacturer Soubrier to allow the British King Edward VII to have sexual intercourse with two women simultaneously.

== History ==
King Edward was known for his affairs with the most famous French aristocrats, prostitutes, actresses and cancan dancers; his father, on learning of his licentiousness, described him as "depraved". He was a regular visitor to the most exquisite and lavish bordello of Victorian Paris, Le Chabanais, where the chair, designed specifically to cater for his various copulatory tastes, was installed. Created by furniture manufacturer Soubrier, it was reported in 2018 as being owned by the Soubrier family and it was included in an exhibition at the Musée d'Orsay in 2015.

At least three versions of the chair are known to exist, including the original owned by the Soubrier family. Two replicas also exist, one of which is located in the Sex Machines Museum in Prague. The other replica was put on sale in February 2020 by an antique furniture store in New Orleans for $68,000.
