= Le Sphinx =

Brothel in Paris (1931–1946)

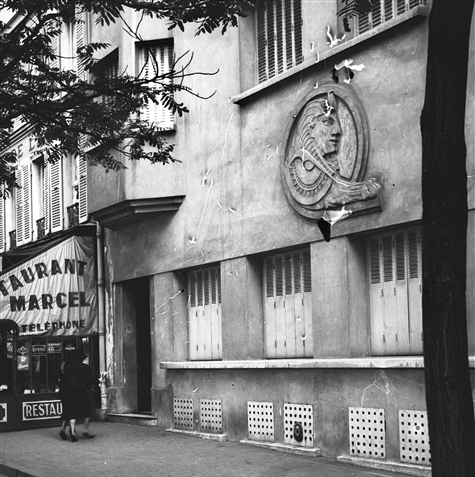
- Le Sphinx facade

- Location in Paris
- Former names: American Bar
- Address: 31 Boulevard Edgar-Quinet
- Location: Paris, France
- Coordinates: 48°50′29.63″N 2°19′22.28″E
- Type: Maison Close (brothel)

Construction
- Built: 1931
- Opened: 24 April 1931
- Closed: 1946
- Demolished: 1962

Le Sphinx was a maison close (brothel) in Paris in the 1930s and 1940s. Along with the "Le Chabanais" and "One-Two-Two" it was considered one of the most luxurious and famous Parisian brothels.

It was the first luxury brothel and opened on the left bank of the Seine. Because of its location in the triangle of "literary" cafés (La Coupole, Rotonda and the Cafe du Dome in Montparnasse, it was popular with literary and artistic bohemians.

== Inside the Brothel ==
"Le Sphinx" was not a brothel in the usual sense of the word. The main attraction in it was not in the richly decorated rooms with air conditioning and nickel-plated beds, but in the dance bar on the first floor, where you could also make a haircut or a pedicure. There were normally 15 girls, selected by the madame, in the bar. However, no one forced them to have sex with the clients, the girls decided themselves. Some Sphinx workers never engaged in prostitution, but worked in as "hostesses", receiving commission from drinks drunk by guests. Probably, this feature of the Sphinx made it so popular among French bohemians of that time.

"Everyone who visited the Sphinx remembers the quiet atmosphere of a delicate, amiable and exquisite participation, reigned in a diffused pink light with a huge hall on the ground floor where customers were met by girls dressed in light dresses. For many artists, writers, journalists, actors, this institution has become something of a club. Meetings were arranged here, they would drop by to chat for a glass in the bar. Kisling came to choose his models, they posed for him in the morning, and, after all, the walls of the Sphinx were hung with portraits painted by him. Well-known journalists: Albert Londres, André Salmon, Pierre Bénard, Georges Simenon and Brewford transformed the "house" into a branch of their offices. From here they were called from the editorial office to be sent to the next report. Henry Miller, another inhabitant of the "house", created an advertising brochure in exchange for a free "service."

— Jean-Paul Crespelle, La vie quotidienne à Montparnasse à la grande époque 1905-1930 1903-1930.

Unlike the "One Two Two" and "Le Chabanais", the rooms of which were executed in the styles of different countries and eras, the "Le Sphinx" was completely sustained in the Egyptian style. The frescos of Le Sphinx were created by Kees van Dongen (the best brothels of the time attracted the attention of famous artists; for example, the walls of Le Chabanais and La Fleur blanche were painted by Toulouse-Lautrec).

"One evening, when all the cafes had already closed, we all went to Le Sphinx. The experience of Toulouse-Lautrec and Van Gogh convinced me that brothels are places that are not devoid of poetry. However, it did not shock me at all. The decoration, more flashy and tasteless than the interiors of Sacré Coeur, light, half-naked women in their airy multi-colored tunics, all seemed much more decent than idiotic pictures and parks with entertainment institutions that Rimbaud liked so much."

— Simone de Beauvoir, quote from the book: Espedal Thomas "Let's Go!" Or the Art of Walking

The greatest commercial success of the Sphinx came in 1937, when the famous Exposition was held in Paris. During the exhibition "Le Sphinx" had 120 girls and in the most successful evenings took up to 1,500 customers.

== History ==
=== Before World War II ===
The initiator and inspiration for the opening of the brothel was Marthe Lemestre, nicknamed "Madame Martun".

Marthe Lemestre began her career in New York City, where during prohibition she opened a bar illegally selling alcohol. A few months before the Wall Street crash and the beginning of the Great Depression, she sold the bar, which gave her start-up capital to start a new business.

Moving to Paris, Madame Martuna decided not to convert an existing building to a brothel, as was done by the owners of "One Two Two" and "Le Chabanais", and built a new five-story mansion in the Art Nouveau style, decorating its facade with a gypsum mask of the Sphinx, from which institution and got its name.

The main investors of the brothel were French criminals Paul Carbone and François Spirito, who already had experience in organizing brothels in Marseille and on the Cote d'Azur.

The absence of trouble with the law was guaranteed by the secret protection of the Préfet de police Jean Chiappe and Minister Albert Sarraut.

The brothel opened with great pomp on April 24, 1931, at 31 Boulevard Edgar-Quinet and was presented as the "American Bar". Guests at the opening included the Mayor of Montparnasse and his wife. The public were informed that the bar is located on the site of the former workshop of the cemetery masons, and is connected by an underground passage to the famous Parisian catacombs.

=== German occupation of Paris ===
During the German occupation, Le Sphinx, like several other luxury Parisian brothels, was requisitioned for the use of German officers, in order to prevent their contacts with the local population. The health services of the Wehrmacht were responsible for organizing the sanitary control of these establishments. Captain Haucke, commissioner of Geheime Feldpolizei, was responsible for managing prostitution in Paris.

Eva Braun and her friends were reported to have visited Le Sphinx, and Hitler supposedly ate in the brothel's restaurant in June 1940.

=== After World War II ===
In 1946, after the adoption of the "Loi Marthe Richard", the brothel was closed. The building was requisitioned to accommodate convalescent students of the Fondation de France.

In 1962, the building was demolished; the van Dongen frescoes and Egyptian interiors were destroyed.

"... there is no more brothel on the corner: that same "Sphinx" (Edgar-Keen Boulevard, 31) with his gypsies, where Henry Miller disposed of the money he did not have. Now this branch of "Bank Popular" with an ATM at the entrance. Now you can get money here when there are none!"

— Frédéric Beigbeder, "Windows on the World (novel)"

A branch of the Banque Populaire rives de Paris now stands on the site.

== La Brigade Mondaine ==
La Brigade Mondaine (National Police Department responsible for the surveillance of prostitution) monitored "Le Spinx" during the 1930s. Photographs were taken to monitor the clientele, and the phones were tapped. Snapshots of the hygiene record drawn up during a health check on November 10, 1936, show that the house employs 5 sub-mistresses and 65 boarders in fancy outfits. The house opened from 3 pm to 5 am, with 3 passes per woman per day during the week, 2 on Sunday, for a single rate of 30 francs plus tip.

== Famous visitors ==
- Writers: Joseph Kessel, Georges Simenon, Blaise Cendrars, Jacques Prévert, Jean-Paul Sartre, Colette, Simone de Beauvoir, Henry Miller, Ernest Hemingway, Lawrence Durrell
- Artists: Moïse Kisling, Kees van Dongen
- Musicians Duke Ellington
- Film actors: Gary Cooper, Errol Flynn
- Politicians: Albert Sarraut, Paul Reynaud
- Alexandre Stavisky, the famous swindler
- There is evidence that in 1932 "Le Sphinx" was visited by Eva Braun with her friends, and on 23 June 1940, during his brief visit to Paris, Hitler ate in the brothel's restaurant.

== Interesting facts and legends ==
Since 1905, opposite "Le Sphinx", at number 16 Boulevard Edgar-Quinet, Maximilian Voloshin rented a studio. Some sources suggest that Voloshin visited the "Le Sphinx" and hired models there. This is incorrect; Voloshin left Paris long before the opening of the famous brothel.

== In literature ==
- "Le Sphinx" is mentioned in Henry Miller's novel Tropic of Cancer

"Over time, having won the trust of Kruger, I penetrated into his heart. I brought him to such a state that he caught me on the street and asked if I would allow him to lend me a few francs. He wanted my soul not to part with the body before moving to a higher level. I was like a pear ripening on a tree. Sometimes I had a relapse, and I admitted that I really need money to meet more earthly needs, such as a visit to the Sphinx or St. Apollina, where he sometimes came in when his flesh was stronger than the spirit."

— Henry Miller, Tropic of Cancer
- In 1975, the former madame of the institution Marthe Lemestre published a book of memoirs "Madame Sphinx".
- The "Sphynx" is mentioned in W. Somerset Maugham's novel The Razor's Edge (1944), when Isabel, Gray, Larry and Willie are making a tour of the tough joints in Paris, sometime in the early 1930s

"We dined late, went to the Folies-Bergère for an hour, and then we set out. I took them first to a cellar near Notre Dame frequented by gangsters and their molls where I knew the proprietor, and he made room for us at a long table at which were sitting some very disreputable people, but I ordered wine for all of them and we drank to one another's healths. it was hot, smoky, and dirty. Then I took them to the Sphynx where women, naked under their smart, tawdry evening dresses, their breasts, nipples and all, exposed, sit in a row on two benches opposite one another and when the band strikes up dance together listlessly with their eyes on the lookout for the men who sit round the dance hall at marble-topped tables. We ordered a bottle of warm champagne. Some of the women gave Isabel the eye as they passed us and I wondered if she knew what it meant." (Chapter V, section 2)

— W. Somerset Maugham, The Razor's Edge

== See also ==
- Prostitution in France
- Parisian Brothels

== Other Paris brothels 1920-1940s ==
- Le Chabanais
- One-Two-Two
- La Fleur blanche
