= La Fleur blanche =

Brothel in Paris

- rue des Moulins
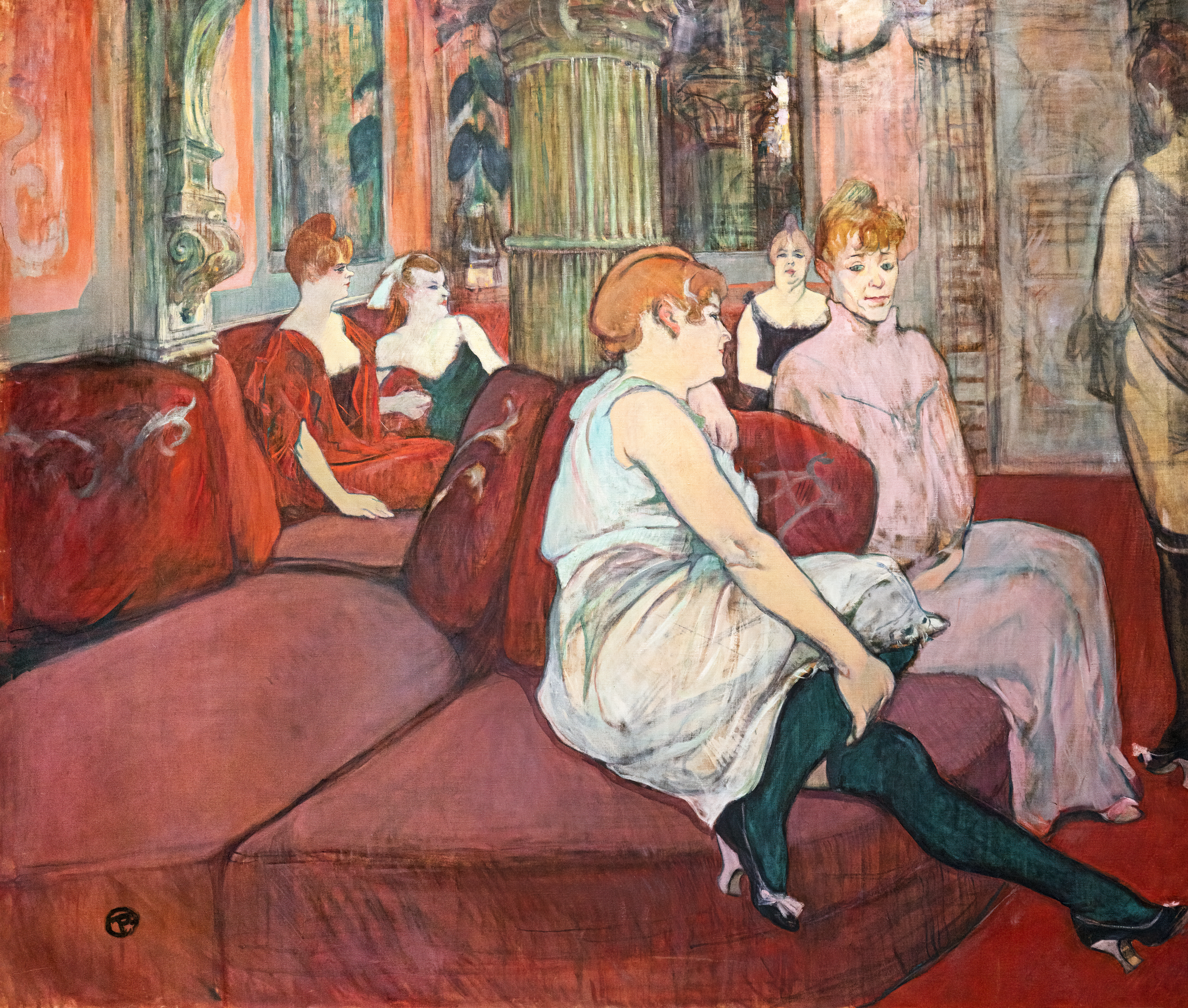
- Au Salon de la rue des Moulins: Toulouse-Lautrec, 1894

- Location in Paris
- Address: 6 rue des Moulins, 1st Arrondissement
- Location: Paris, France
- Coordinates: 48.8666°N 2.3352°E

Construction
- Opened: 1860
- Closed: 1946

La Fleur blanche was a famous maison close (brothel) in the city of Paris, located at 6 rue des Moulins in the 1st Arrondissement. The property was also known as rue des Moulins and was famous for its torture room.

== History ==
The building was originally the home of a regency financier, and became a brothel in 1860 during the Second Empire.

It was one of the most luxurious brothels in Paris. Its clientele included kings, crown princes, members of the aristocracy, and numerous heads of state.

The brothel was known for its extremely lavish bedrooms, each one having its own theme; for example, one was in a Moorish style, another was ducal.

During the German occupation, La Fleur blanche, like several other luxury Parisian brothels, was requisitioned for the use of German officers, in order to prevent their contacts with the local population. The health services of the Wehrmacht were responsible for organizing the sanitary control of these establishments. Captain Haucke, commissioner of Geheime Feldpolizei, was responsible for managing prostitution in Paris.

In 1946, after the adoption of the "Loi Marthe Richard", the brothel was closed. The contents were auctioned off by Maurice Rheims.

== Works of Toulouse-Lautrec ==
La Fleur blanche was notably frequented by Toulouse-Lautrec (where he had a room, according to legend), He was called The Coffee Pot by the girls due to his small size.

The artist painted Griserie the beautiful stranger on a wall in the brothel. The brothel also gave inspiration for forty paintings and drawings, including Mills Street Fair (1894), The Sofa (1894) and Ces dames au réfectoire (1893).

He also painted the prostitutes in the "Rue des Moulins" at the time of a medical inspection of which they were obliged to have regularly. In Medical Inspection rue des Moulins (1894), two girls raise their shifts in preparation for the examination. A physician was sent to perform these weekly medical examination in deplorable conditions of hygiene, examining them with a disposable non-disinfected speculum.

Toulouse-Lautrec paintings inspired by La Fleur blanche
Salon de la rue des Moulins (1894)

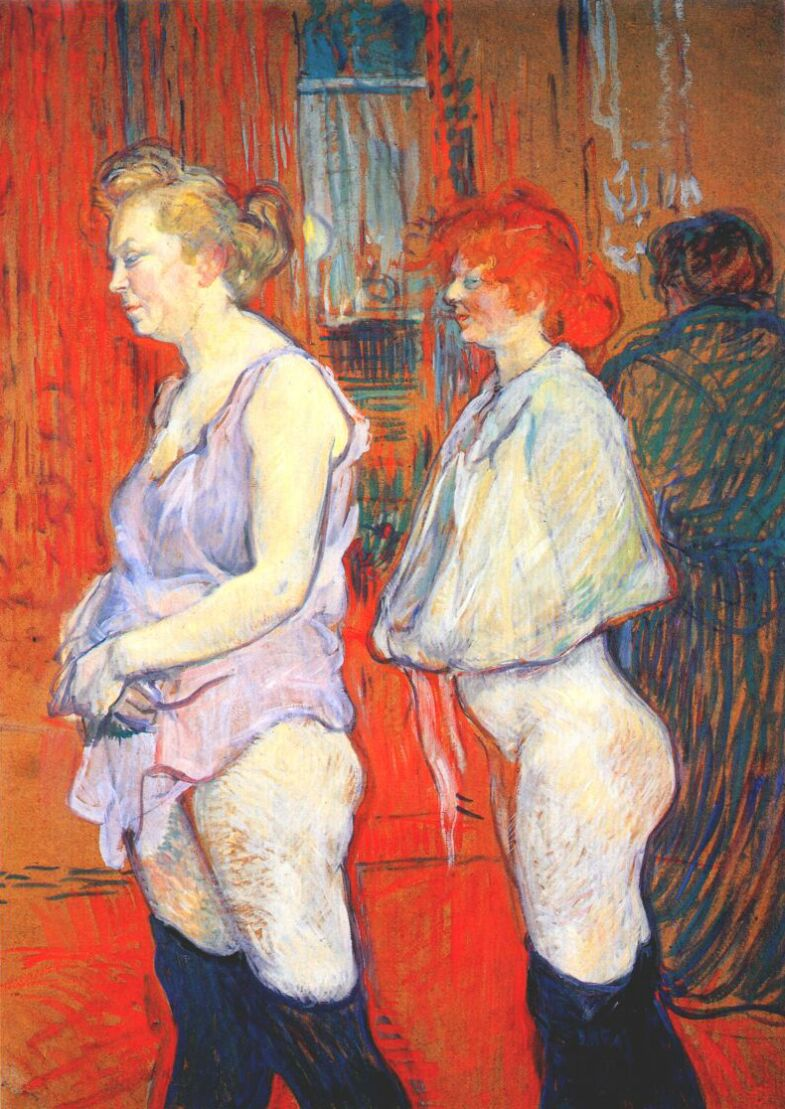
Inspection médicale rue des Moulins (1894)

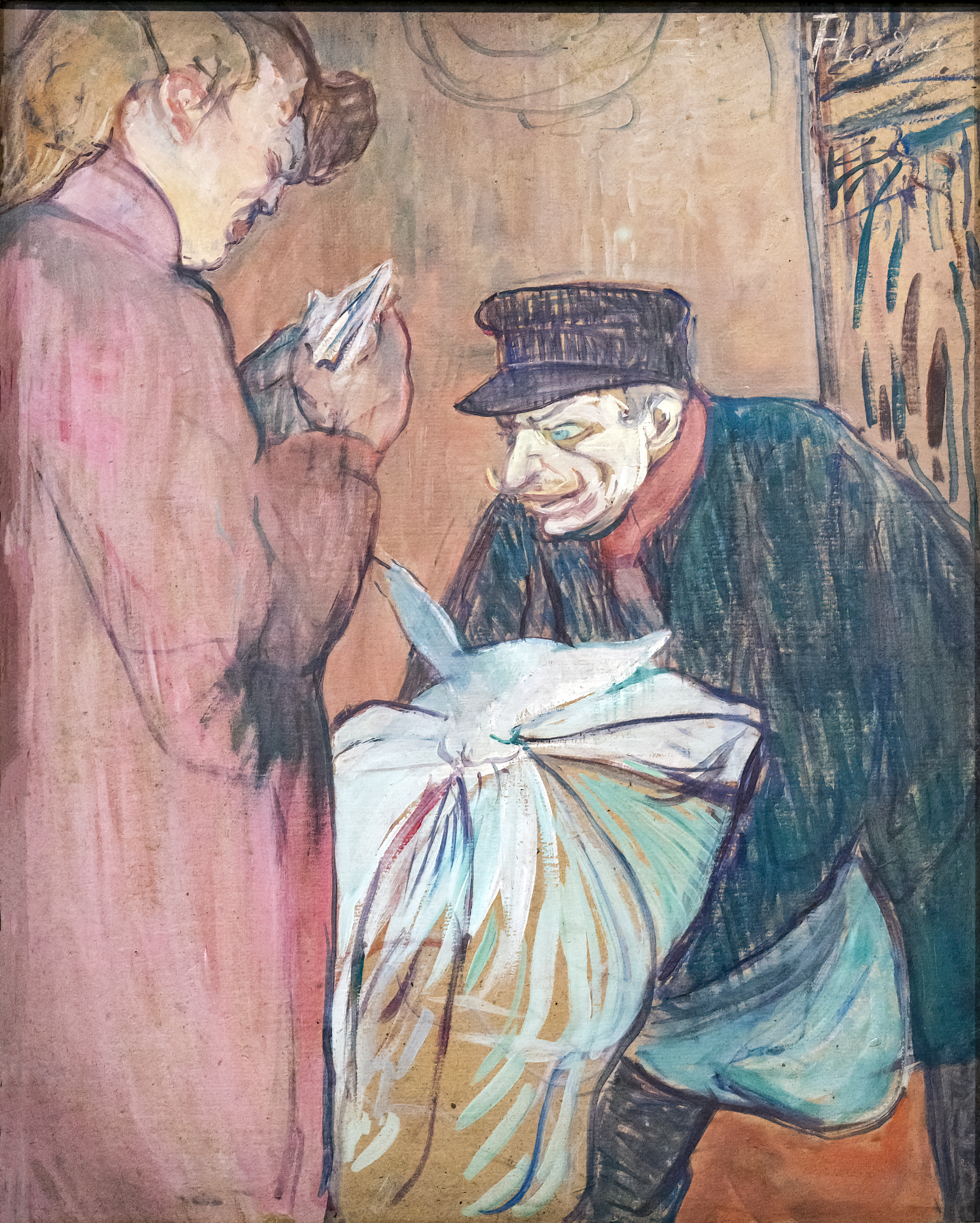
Le Blanchisseur de la Maison (1894)

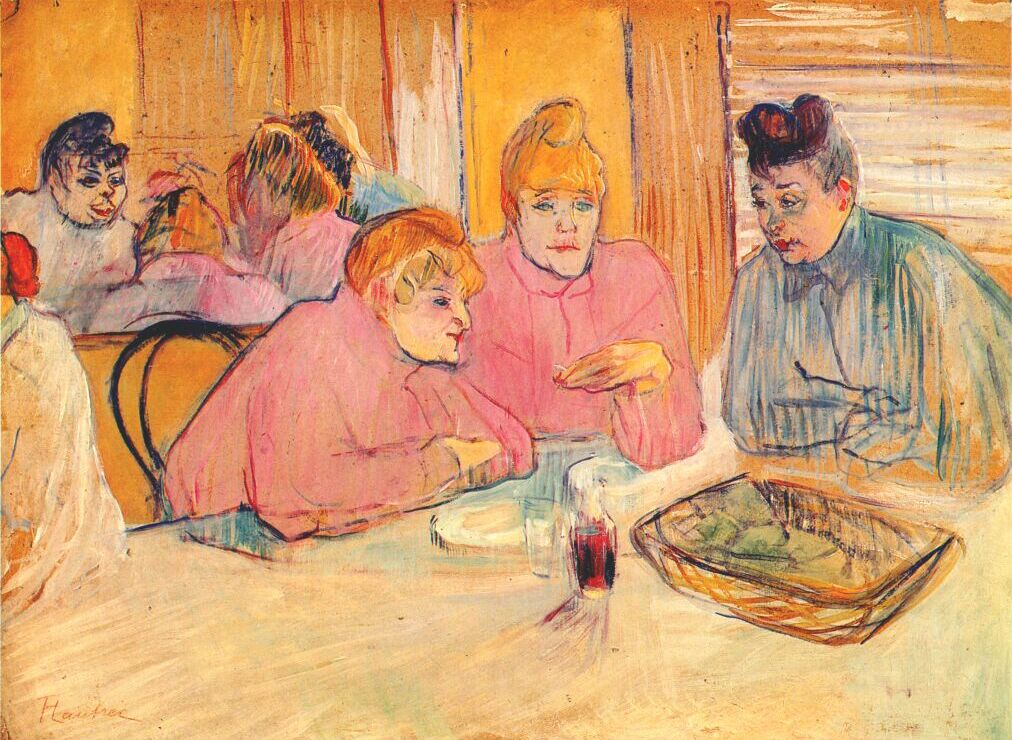
Ces dames au réfectoire (1893)

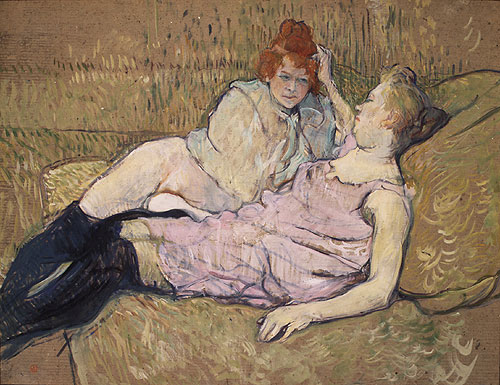
Le Sofa (1894-1896)

== La Païva bed ==
La Fleur blanche contained a lavishly carved mahogany bed. It was reputed to have been commissioned by French courtesan La Païva, but she never took delivery. Instead, it ended up in La Fleur blanche. The bed was put up for auction in 2017 by Sotheby's with a guide price of £500,000 - £800,000. Sotheby's described to bed as:

An exceptional carved mahogany bed in the form of a shell-shaped vessel upon which a two-tailed figure of mermaid, carved in the round, is seated, her right arm upraised; the shell with ribbed mouldings and carved with scrolls and stylised shells, two swans guiding the boat on each side
210cm. high, 302cm. wide, 210cm. deep;

== See also ==
- Prostitution in France
- Parisian Brothels
- One-Two-Two
- Le Chabanais
- Le Sphinx

== Bibliography ==
- Marc Lemonier et Alexandre Dupouy, Histoire(s) du Paris libertin, La Musardine, 2003 (ISBN 978-2842711771).
- Véronique Willemin, La Mondaine, histoire et archives de la Police des Mœurs, Hoëbeke, 2009 (ISBN 978-2842303594).
- Nicole Canet, Maisons closes, 1860-1946 [archive] 328 pages, octobre 2009 (ISBN 978-2-9532351-0-4), édition simultanée à *l'exposition éponyme de décembre 2009, et Décors de bordels, entre intimité et exubérance [archive]. Paris, Province, *Afrique du Nord, 1860–1946, 408 pages, préface de Claude Croubois, textes d'Étienne Cance, octobre 2011 (ISBN 978-2-9532351-3-5). Tiré à 1 000 exemplaires. Chapitres consacrés à la Fleur Blanche.
