= Loi Marthe Richard =

1946 law that abolished prostitution in France

National Assembly (France)
- Long title: "Dite Marthe Richard for closing houses of tolerance and strengthening the fight against proxenetism"
- Citation: Loi n°46-685 du 13 avril 1946 "Online facsinilie".
- Territorial extent: Metropolitan France
- Enacted by: National Assembly (France)
- Enacted: 13 April 1946
- Commenced: 14 April 1946
- Introduced by: Marthe Richard
- Status: In force

Loi Marthe Richard (Marthe Richard Law) of 13 April 1946 abolished the regime of regulated prostitution in France that had been in force since 1804. It required the closure of brothels ("maisons de tolérance"), and the abolition of the Regulation System or registered prostitution. The law bears the name of Marthe Richard, who was a municipal councillor of Paris but not a parliamentary representative.

== Build up to the law ==
On 13 December 1945, Marthe Richard, elected councillor of the 4th arrondissement of Paris, presented to the Conseil municipal de Paris a proposal for the closure of Paris brothels. In her speech, she did not attack prostitutes as much as society, responsible in her view for "organised and patent debauchery" and organized crime, which she argued benefitted from regulated prostitution. She also reminded the council that prostitutes were complicit with the German occupation during WW2. The proposal was accepted and on 20 December 1945, the police prefect, Charles Luizet, was authorised to close, without notice, the houses of prostitution in the Department of the Seine within 3 months (by 15 March 1946 at the latest).

Encouraged by this success, Marthe Richard started a press campaign for a vote on a law generalising these measures to all France. It was supported by the Ligue pour le relèvement de la moralité publique (League of Social and Moral Action) and by the Minister of Public Health and Population, Robert Prigent.

On 9 April 1946, MP Marcel Roclore presented the report of the Committee on the Family, Population and Public Health, and concluded that the closure of brothels was necessary. The deputy Pierre Dominjon, member of the Ligue pour le relèvement de la moralité publique, tabled a proposal for a law which was voted on 13 April 1946 in the Chamber of Deputies. The closure of brothels took effect from 6 November 1946. Withdrawing the administrative authorizations without compensation marked the end of legalisation and the start of a policy of abolitionism.

== Consequences ==
After the adoption of the law, Marthe Richard ensured that article 5, which ended keeping national files on prostitution, in which she was still recorded, was enacted. These police records were replaced by a health and social file for prostitutes (law of 24 April 1946) in order to prevent prostitutes with sexually transmitted infections trying to evade the treatment of their disease. This law was little applied and was repealed on 28 July 1960, the date of French ratification of the United Nations Convention of 2 December 1949 for the Suppression of the Traffic in Persons and of the Exploitation of the Prostitution of Others. (France's late ratification of the convention was due to the existence of brothels in its colonial empire).

Approximately 1,400 establishments were closed, including 195 in Paris (177 official establishments): the best known were Le Chabanais, Le Sphinx, La Fleur blanche, One-Two-Two but also the maisons d'abattage ("slaughterhouses") such as Le Fourcy and the Lanterne Verte.

This law caused amusement at the Brigade Mondaine on the 3rd floor of 36, quai des Orfèvres, since Richard was herself a prostitute until around 1915, when she decided to make a clean sweep of her past. Some police officers were opposed to the law because it risked depriving them of one of their main sources of information (the prostitutes themselves). Prostitution was still a legal activity, only its organization, exploitation (procuring), its visible manifestations and the offense of soliciting were prohibited by law; however. the police continued to tolerate bawdy houses. Many brothel owners turned themselves into owners of clandestine inns concentrated around French and American military barracks as well as in major cities. Whilst the law provided for the collection of prostitutes in "reception and outplacement centers", many continued their activities clandestinely.

Critics of French prostitution policy, such as Mouvement du Nid, question how effective this was, its implementation, and whether it really closed the "maisons". For instance, they point to the presence of military brothels in Algeria till 1960.

== Bibliography ==
- Natacha Henry, Marthe Richard, l'aventurière des maisons closes, La Librairie Vuibert, 2016
- Alphonse Boudard, La fermeture : 13 avril 1946, la fin des maisons closes, Robert Laffont, 1986
