= Brigade de répression du proxénétisme =

The Brigade de répression du proxénétisme (BRP) is a judicial police service of the French National Police, responsible for the surveillance of prostitution and the repression of procuring.

The service has had various forms of organization during the course of its history. It previously had been designated as the Brigade of Manners and the Brigade de Mondaine (Social Brigade), expressions that remain popular to this day.

There are several brigades of this type; the most important is that of the Paris judicial police.

== History ==
The history of the BRP can be traced back to the creation of the general police lieutenant under the command of Gabriel Nicolas de la Reynie. Based on a network of paid informers and provocateurs (known as les mouches, or "flies"), he succeeded in dismantling the "court of miracles". However, the first mention of a department devoted to the "policing of morals" dates from 1747, with the creation of the "Office of the discipline of manners" by Nicolas René Berryer, the lieutenant general of police. It was known as the Brigade of Manners.

The essential function of this office was as an intelligence service that used prostitutes and housewives to obtain compromising information about their clients, even if this led to repression. As an example the police searched for religious libertines.

This intelligence function remains central in the vice squad in the 21st century.

From 1796, under the Directory, an era of tolerance began. Insertion of prostitutes into the register of prostitution and compulsory medical examination were under the control of the BRP, which occupied the second office of the first division of the police prefecture.

During the 19th century, the reputation of the police was poor and there were many scandals. There was also agent misconduct; 32 of 40 officers were dismissed in a few months. Prostitutes were subjected to police abuse, and some preferred death to being arrested by this brigade. The most publicized incidents related to honest women being confused with "girls of joy" and arrested by police officers, who seemed to have become uncontrollable. The scandal resulted in the Paris city council opposing the brigade at the prefecture. It designated a Commission of the Police des mœurs, whose work culminated in the dissolution of the vice squad in 1881. Yves Guyot, a journalist and city councilor, was one who held the vice/morality police in contempt.

The brigade was renamed as the "Social Brigade" in 1901. It was defined as a section of the Service des garnis within the Prefecture of Police. Its function was limited to an intelligence service. The duties were quickly extended to the suppression of begging (1907). In 1914, following the reorganization of the police by Célestin Hennion, this brigade was transferred to the newly created judicial police. It reverted to its former title, the vice squad.

Its functions were defined for a long time as controlling the following:

- Prostitution and related crimes (control of brothels, repression of soliciting and clandestine houses, white slave trade...)
- Morality (repression of pederasty, obscene publications ...)
- Suppression of drug trafficking

In 1930, the name was officially changed to the Brigade mondaine (because of the confusion with the service and agents of the municipal police, who were responsible for monitoring prostitutes on public roads), a name it kept until 1975.

In 1946, following the closure of the brothels, the control function of these disappeared, at least officially: in addition to the repression of procuring, the brigade managed and supervised the hundreds of illegal lupanars (clandestines) which had replaced the brothels. The agents were at this time organized in groups (the group of "OBM" - offenses against morality, the bars group ...).

Michel Poniatowski transformed the Brigade's drugs and pimping policy in February 1975, redefining its powers by limiting the fight against procuring, white slavery and drug trafficking and strengthening its workforce.

In 1989, the brigade was split into a narcotics brigade and a pimping unit; Martine Monteil became the first female commissioner appointed to head the BRP.

== Bibliography ==
- Alliaume, Laurence (2008). Le fléau de la drogue (in French). INHES. "(Institut national des hautes études de sécurité)"
- Berlière, Jean-Marc (1992). La police des mœurs sous la IIIe République (in French). Editions du Seuil. ISBN 9782020125543.
- Berlière, J.-M. (1990). "Police et libertés sous la III e République : le problème de la police des mœurs". Revue Historique (in French). 283 (2 (574)): 235–275. JSTOR 40954914.
- Cancès, Claude (2014). L'ancien patron du 36 quai des Orfèvres raconte la brigade mondaine. Sexe, pouvoir, argent... - Claude Cancès (in French). Pygmalion. ISBN 9782756410647.
- Frachon, Matthieu (2011). 36, quai des Orfèvres: Des hommes, un mythe (in French). Editions du Rocher. ISBN 9782268004921.
- Willemin, Véronique (2009). La Mondaine: Histoire et archives de la police des mœurs (in French). Hoëbeke. ISBN 9782842303594. ASIN 2842303598.
