= One-Two-Two =

Brothel in Paris

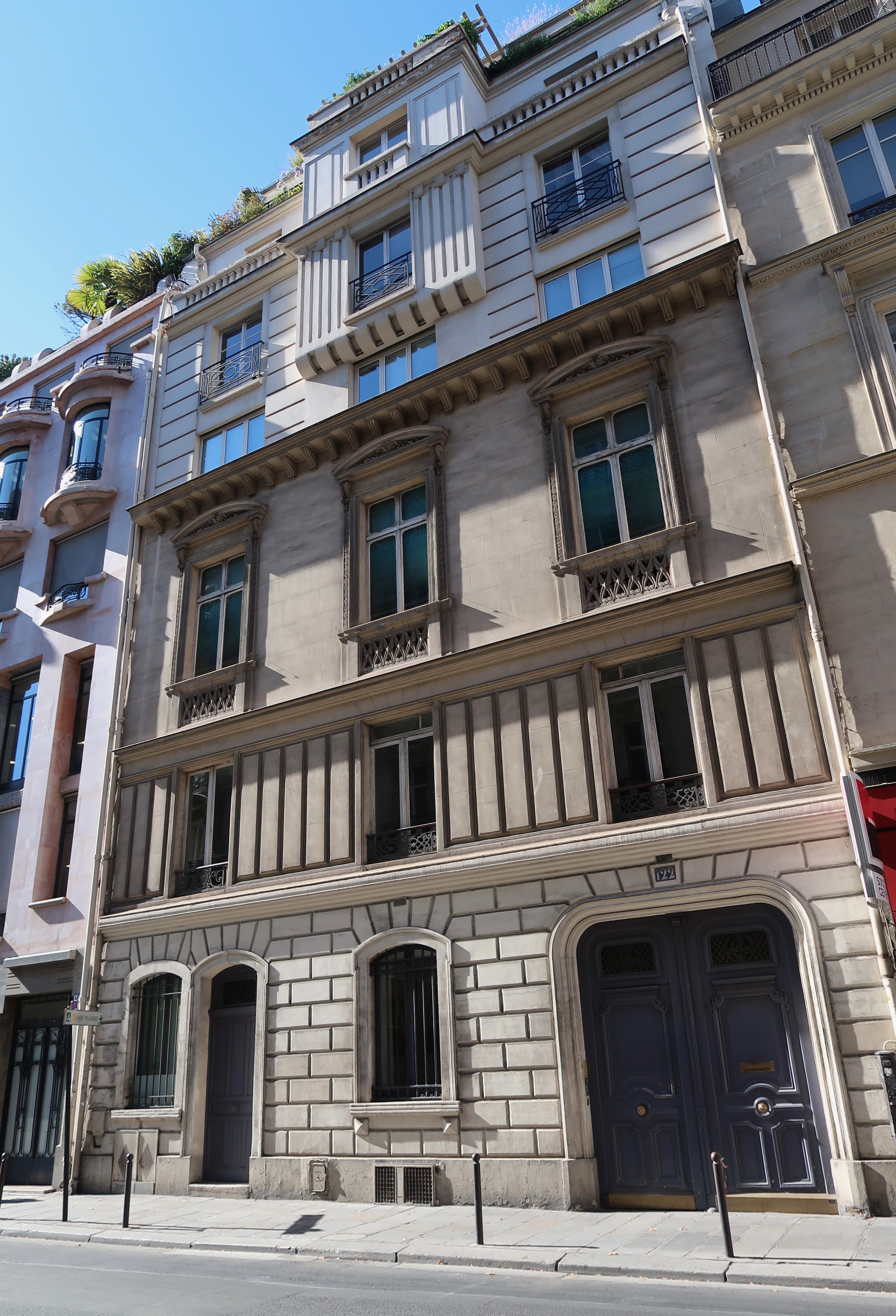
- The building in 2020

- Location within Paris

General information
- Type: Hôtel particulier
- Architectural style: neoclassical
- Location: Paris, France, 122, Rue de Provence; 75008 Paris, France
- Coordinates: 48.8741861°N 2.32641389°E
- Completed: circa 1800

Technical details
- Floor count: 7

The One-Two-Two was one of the most luxurious and illustrious brothels of Paris in the 1930s and 1940s. The name was taken from the address, 122 Rue de Provence, 8th arrondissement of Paris. The numbers were translated into English to ensure that foreign tourists would be able to find the brothel and as a password for French people.

Opened in 1924, the "One-Two-Two" closed its doors in 1946 when the Loi Marthe Richard prohibited brothels in France. The building is now used for various businesses.

== Operation ==
The building had twenty-two decorated rooms. Forty to sixty-five prostitutes worked for 300 clients per day. It was open from 4:00 pm to 4:00 am and the sub-mistresses filtered the men at the entrance. The girls of the establishment had to have four sex-sessions a day at twenty francs each, excluding tips, and two sessions on Sundays. There was also a bar, a refectory for the girls, and a doctor's office.

There was also a restaurant, the Bœuf à la Ficelle (lit. 'beef on a string', named after a recipe of roast beef filet dipped in a broth of vegetables and spices on the end of a string). The waitresses were naked, except for aprons and high-heeled shoes, with camellias in their hair. Guests were welcome for dinner, coffee and cigars.

== German occupation ==
The establishment was not affected by rationing. Hermann Brandl, a head of Abwehr operations in France after September 1940, was involved in the Parisian black market. He and Wilhelm Radecke ran their black market operations from the One-Two-Two. After the Liberation of Paris, Fabienne traded with the Americans, who she remarked were racist.

== "The journey around the world" ==
Each room had its own women, highlighted on pedestals, with fitting outfits and lighting. The rooms were decorated like théatrical scenes of many periods and countries of the world. Some guests practiced "the journey around the world", which consisted of adopting positions inspired by the Kama Sutra, in the rooms of different countries, thereby making a world tour of erotic pleasures.

The main rooms were:

- The transatlantic steamer cabin, with sea view, porthole and deck chair.
- The pirate room, which included a four-poster bed that would mechanically swing like a boat in a tempest whilst jets of water, hidden in the walls, would drench the occupants for what Fabienne called "the ultimate leaky boat sex experience".
- The Orient Express room, an exact replica of a cabin in the famous train. This included the shaking and bouncing effect of being on a train and included a railway soundtrack. As an option, patrons could demand for an intrusive conductor to enter the room and join in the festivities.
- The hay loft with real straw.
- The igloo room.
- The "Indian" tipi.
- The Provençal room.
- The country room.
- The Egyptian chamber, inspired by Cleopatra.
- The Roman triclinium.
- The Greek chamber.
- The African chamber.
- The Renaissance room with the courtesans of King Francis I of France.
- The mirrored gallery, inspired by the Palace of Versailles, with huge swiveling mirrors.

The rooms on the upper floors were devoted to BDSM pleasures. As Fabienne said: "The closer one got to the heavens, the closer they would get to Hell".

- The torture chamber of the Middle Ages, with shackles, chains and whips.
- The torture room with crucifixion staging, where handcuffs replace the nails to tie the victim to the cross.

== See also ==
- Brothels in Paris – Venues for indoor prostitution in Paris, France
- Le Chabanais – Brothel in Paris (1878–1946)
- La Fleur blanche – Brothel in Paris
- Prostitution in France

== Bibliography ==
- Fabienne Jamet, One Two Two – 122 rue de Provence, Olivier Orban, 1975.
- Editions Galerie Au Bonheur du Jour | Décors de bordels, Nicole Canet Entre Intimité et Exubérance, Paris-Province 1860–1946, Ed. Nicole Canet, 2011

== Filmography ==
- One, Two, Two : 122, rue de Provence is a 1978 French film directed by Christian Gion. The film chronicles the eventful daily life of the establishment.
