= Le Chabanais =

Brothel in Paris (1878–1946)

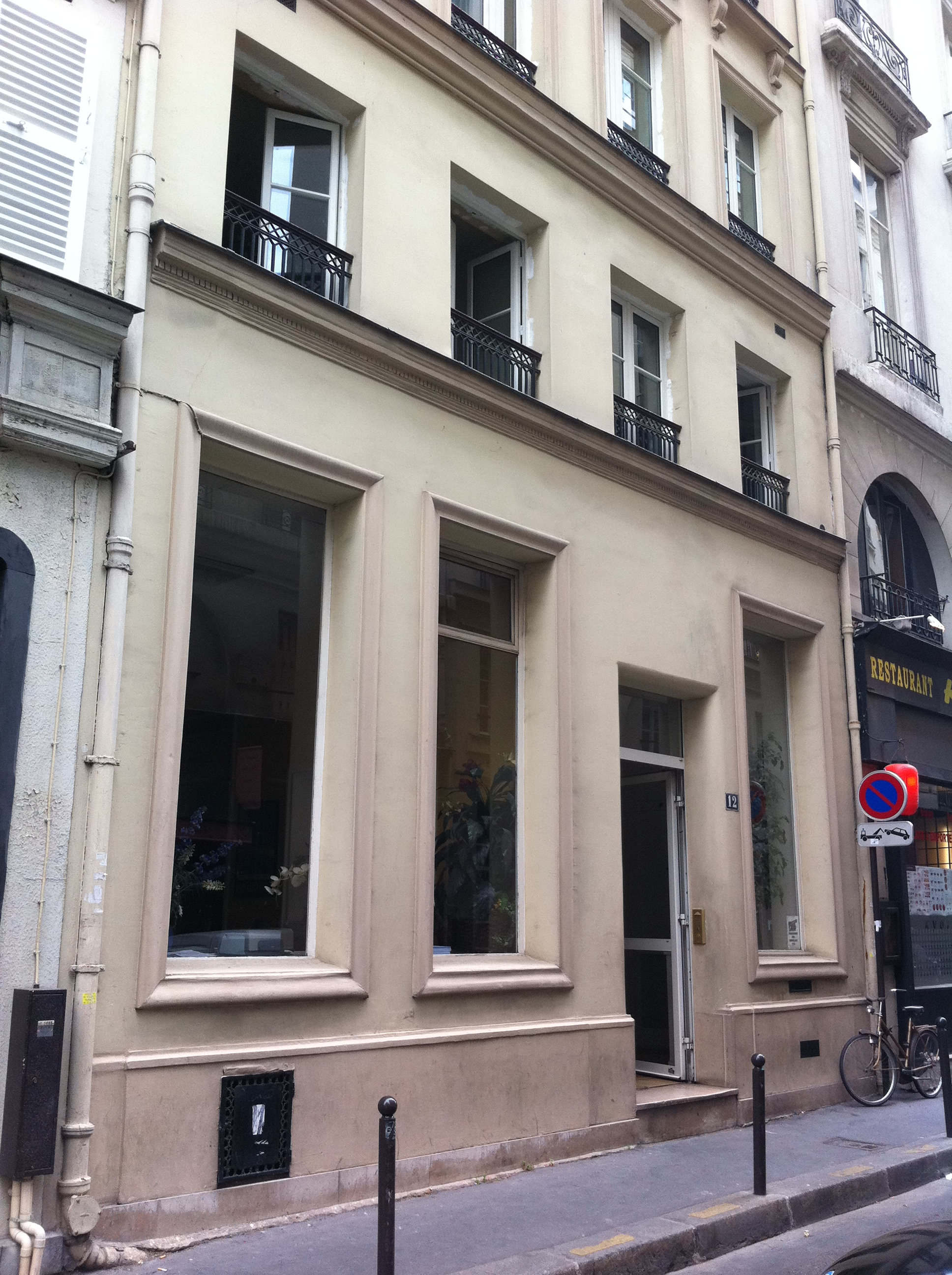
- 12 rue Chabanais today

- Location in Paris
- Address: 12 rue Chabanais
- Location: Paris, France
- Coordinates: 48°52′3.41″N 2°20′13.50″E
- Operator: Madame Kelly; (Alexandrine Joannet)

Construction
- Opened: 1878
- Closed: 1946
- Cost: 1.7 million francs

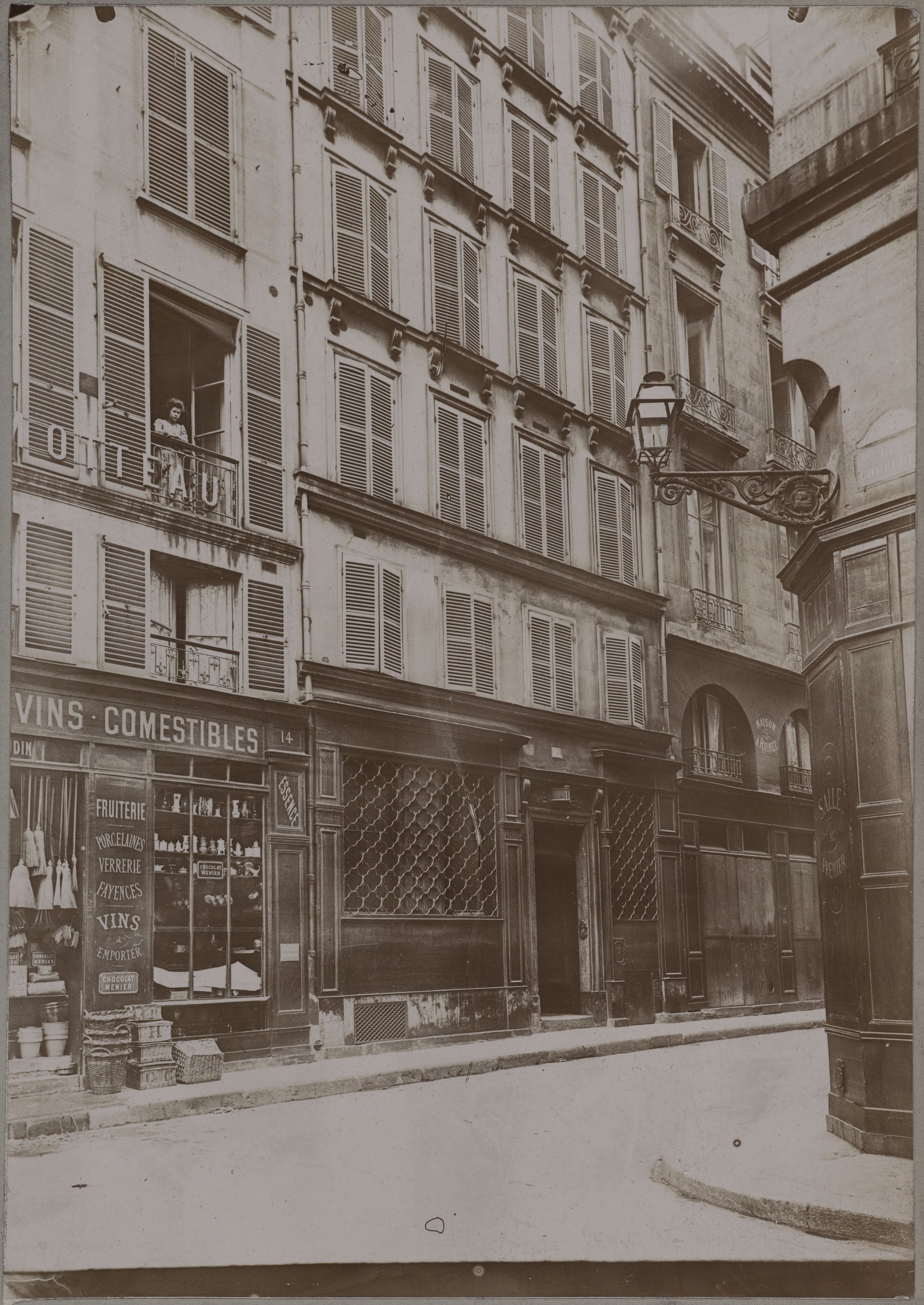
Le Chabanais, circa 1900.

Le Chabanais was one of the best known and most luxurious brothels in Paris, operating near the Louvre at 12 rue Chabanais from 1878 until 1946, when brothels were outlawed in France. It was founded by the Irish-born Madame Kelly, who was closely acquainted with several members at the Jockey-Club de Paris. Among the habitués were Albert, Prince of Wales (later Edward VII of the United Kingdom); Henri de Toulouse-Lautrec; Cary Grant; Humphrey Bogart, Mae West and diplomatic guests of the French government.

== History ==
=== Belle Époque ===
The brothel, famous enough to warrant mentioning in the 7-volume Nouveau Larousse illustré encyclopaedia of 1904, was founded by the Irish-born Madame Kelly (real name Alexandrine Joannet, or possibly Jouannet), who was closely associated with several members at the prestigious Jockey-Club de Paris. She sold shares in the profitable business to wealthy anonymous investors. The total cost of the establishment was reported to be the exorbitant sum of 1.7 million francs. The entrance hall was designed as a bare stone cave; the bedrooms were lavishly decorated, many in their own style: Moorish, Hindu, Japanese, Pompeii, and Louis XVI. The Japanese room won a design prize at the 1900 World Fair in Paris. Madame Kelly died in 1899.

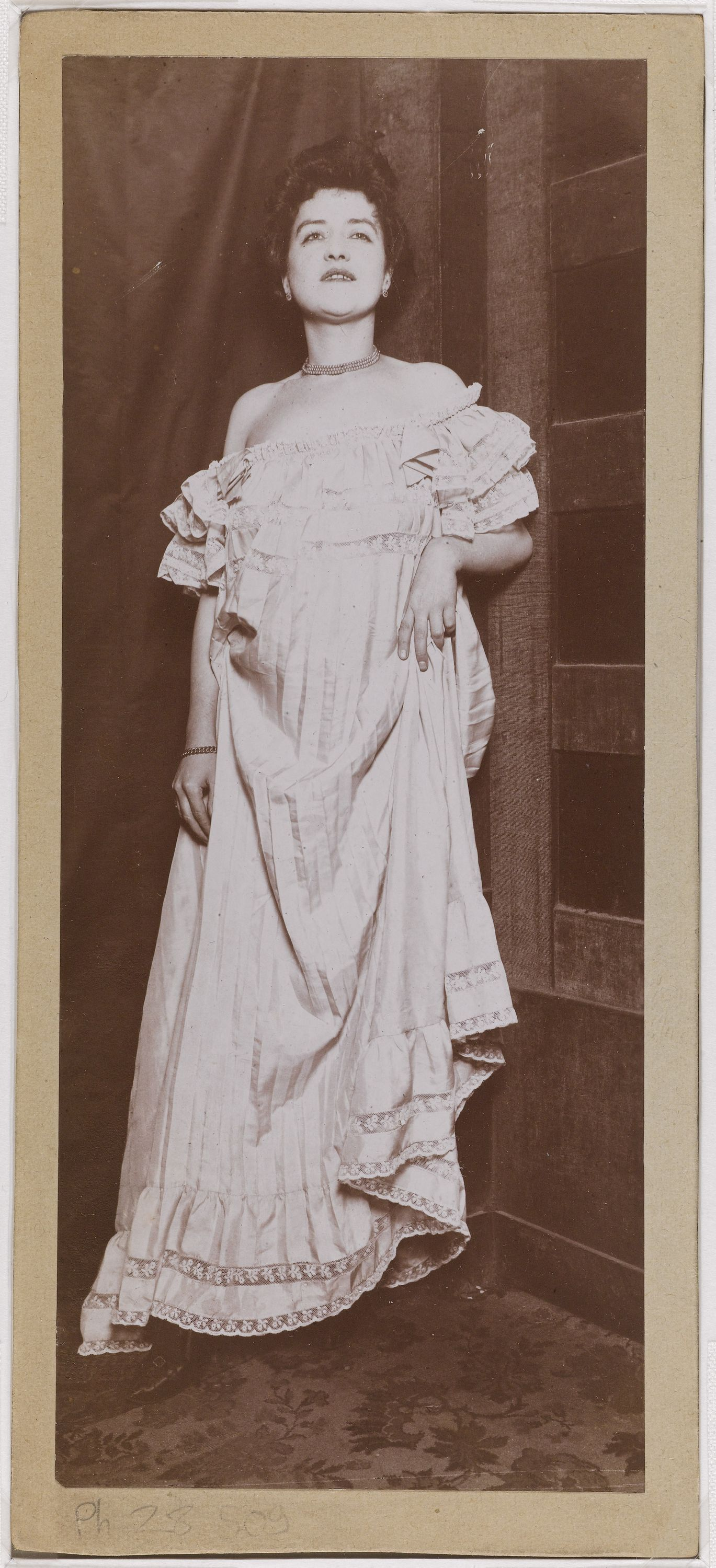
Irma

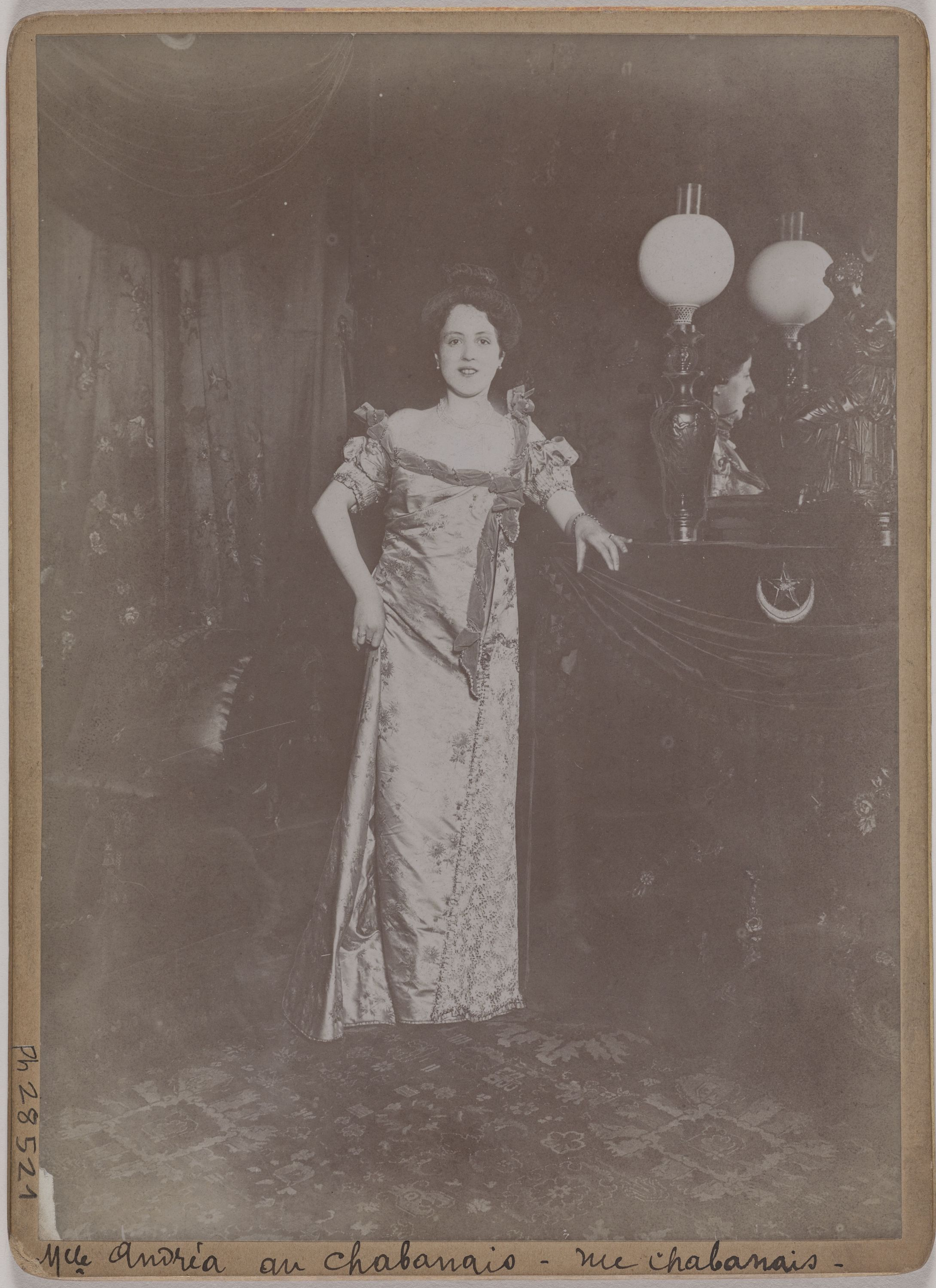
Andréa

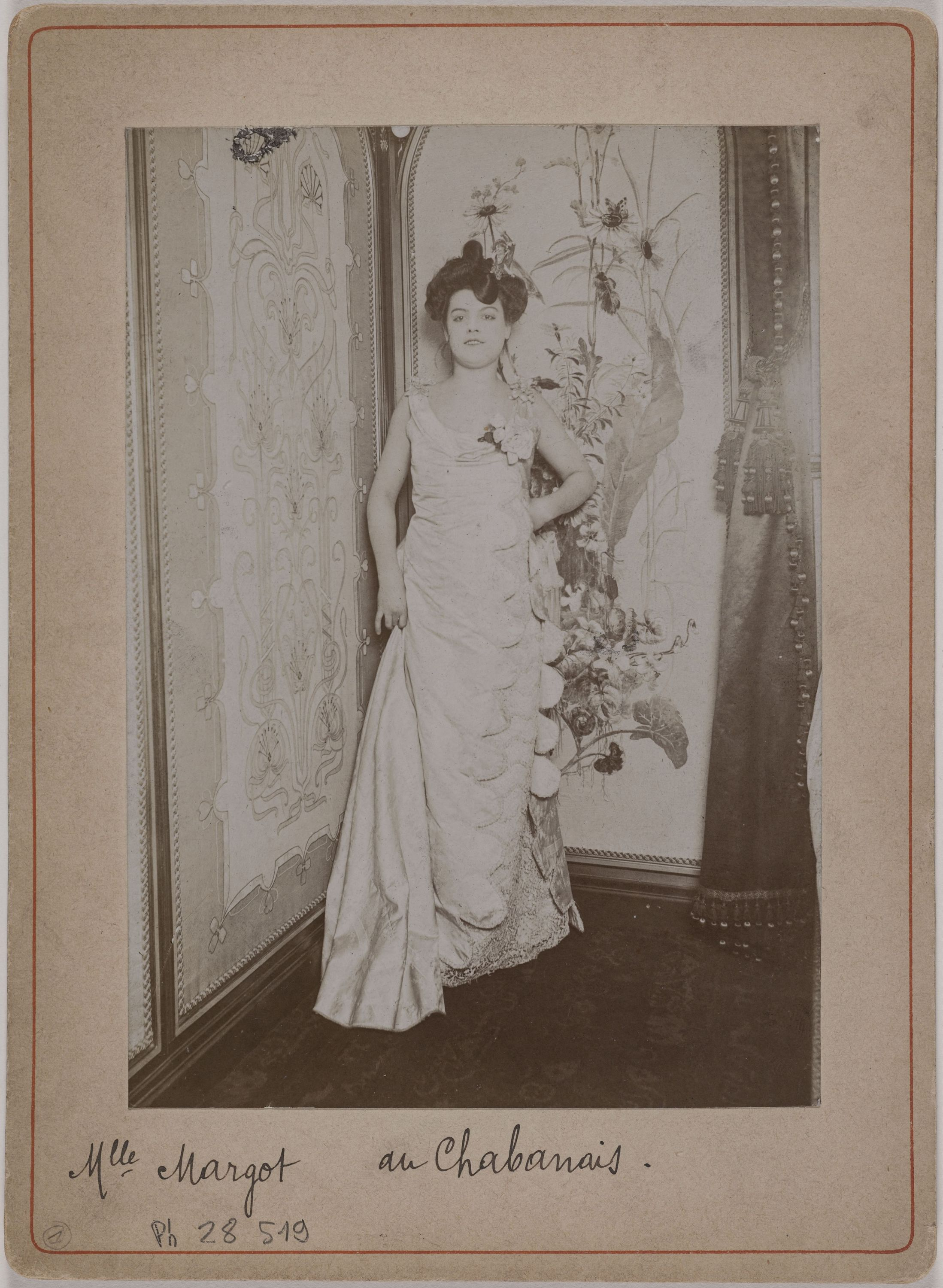
Margot

=== Post-World War I ===
In the mid-1920s, Le Chabanais was overtaken by the One-Two-Two as the top luxury brothel in Paris.

=== World War II ===
During the World War II German occupation of France, 20 top Paris brothels, including Le Chabanais, Le Sphinx, One-Two-Two, La Fleur blanche (fr), La rue des Moulins, and Chez Marguerite, were reserved by the Wehrmacht for German officers and collaborating Frenchmen. The brothels flourished and Hermann Göring visited Le Chabanais, as is related in the 2009 two-volume book 1940–1945 Années Erotiques by Patrick Buisson.

=== Post-World War II ===
The French legal brothels, known as "maisons closes" or "maisons de tolérance", were closed by law in 1946, after a campaign by Marthe Richard. The backlash against the brothels was in part due to their collaboration with the Germans. A 2002 survey showed that, despite the fact that 64% of French people thought that prostitution was "a degrading practice for the image and the dignity of the woman (or the man)", nearly two-thirds believed that reopening the brothels would be a good idea.

=== Closure and auction ===
On 8 May 1951, the contents of La Chabanais were sold at auction by Maurice Rheims, publicly revealing the furnishings, furniture and equipment including Edward VII's chaise de volupté and his copper champagne bath decorated with a sphinx. The bath was bought for 110,500 francs by the antiques dealer Jacob Street and was acquired in 1972 by Salvador Dalí, who placed it in his room at the Hotel Meurice.

== Notable visitors ==
The French government sometimes included a visit to Le Chabanais as part of the programme for foreign guests of state, disguising it as "visit with the President of the Senate" in the official programme at the opening of the World's Fair in 1889.

Prominent visitors included King Carlos I of Portugal; Jagatjit Singh, Maharaja of Kapurthala; writer Pierre Louÿs; Cary Grant; Humphrey Bogart; Mae West; Roscoe Arbuckle, and Marlène Dietrich on the arm of Erich Maria Remarque.

=== Toulouse-Lautrec ===
The artist Henri de Toulouse-Lautrec was a frequent visitor; he painted 16 tableaux for the house, now held in private collections.

=== Guy de Maupassant ===
The author Guy de Maupassant built a copy of the Moorish room in his mansion at the sea, so that he would not have to miss it during his vacations.

=== Edward, Prince of Wales ===
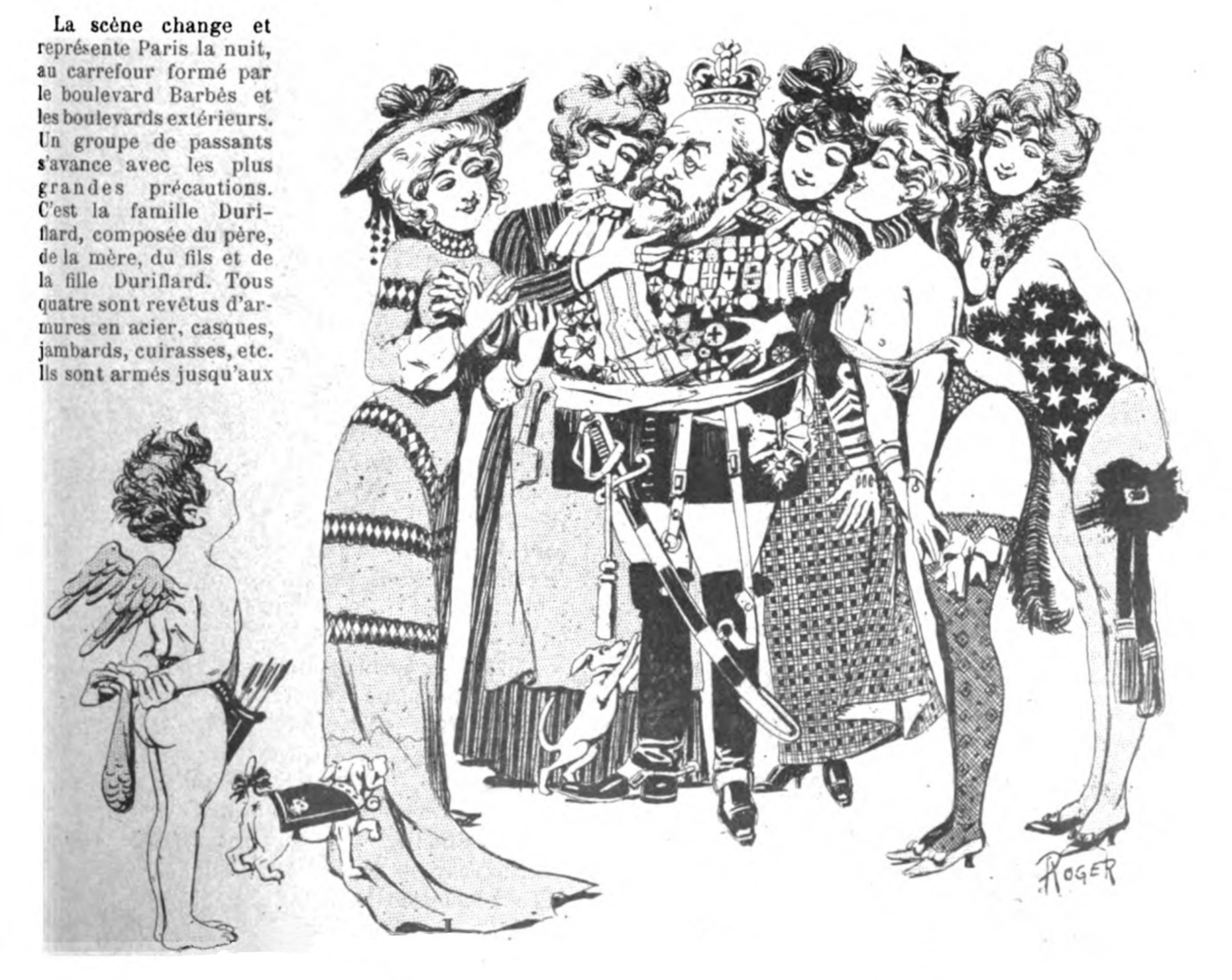
Caricature of Edward VII in Le Chabanais, published 1903 in L'indiscret

Prince Edward, Prince of Wales, who would later become King Edward VII (nicknamed "Bertie"), often visited during the 1880s and 1890s. One room carried his coat of arms over the bed and a large copper bath-tub with a half-woman-half-swan figurehead, which he liked to fill with champagne and which, in 1951 after the closure, Salvador Dalí bought for 112,000 francs. Edward, who was heavily overweight, also had a "love chair" (siège d'amour) manufactured by Louis Soubrier, a cabinetmaker of the Rue du Faubourg Saint-Antoine, allowing easy access for oral and other forms of sex with several participants.

== Modern usage ==
Today, the six-story building previously housing Le Chabanais is used as an apartment house.

=== Musée de l'érotisme ===
While it was open, the Musée de l'érotisme in Pigalle devoted one floor to the maisons closes, exhibiting Polissons et galipettes, a collection of short erotic silent movies that were used to entertain brothel visitors, and copies of Le Guide Rose, a contemporary brothel guide that also carried advertising. The 2003 BBC Four documentary Storyville – Paris Brothel describes the maisons closes and contains footage of the Chabanais. A replica of Edward's love seat is exhibited in a Prague sex museum; the original was sold at auction in 1996 to a private party.

=== Exhibition ===
An exhibition about historical Paris brothels took place in a gallery across the street from the building at 12 rue Chabanais from November 2009 to January 2010.

== See also ==
- Prostitution in France
- Parisian Brothels
