= Military occupation of France =

Military occupations of France may refer to:

- Sixth Coalition occupation of France, after the Napoleonic Wars (1814)
- Seventh Coalition occupation of France (1815–1818), under the command of the Duke of Wellington after the Hundred Days
- Prussian occupation of northern France, during the Franco-Prussian War (1870–1871) and afterwards (1871-1873) as a guarantee of the payment of war reparations
- German occupation of north-east France, during World War I by the German Empire (1914–1918)
- German military administration in occupied France, during World War II by Nazi Germany (1940–1944)
- Italian occupation of France, during World War II (1940–1943)
- Case Anton, the military occupation of all of France by Nazi Germany and Italy (November 1942)

== See also ==
- Military Administration in Belgium and Northern France
- Italian occupation of Corsica (1942–1943)
- Zone occupée (occupied zone), in parts of western and northern France, administered by the Militärverwaltung in Frankreich
- Zone libre (free zone), in parts of southern France, where the rump state Vichy France was established until occupied in 1942
- Zone interdite (Forbidden Zone), may refer either to the zone with restricted access to civilians along the Atlantic coast or the zone forbidden for refugees to return to
- Alsace-Lorraine during World War II
