= Lanterne Verte =

Brothel in Paris

- Location in Paris
- Address: Rue de Chartres/Rue de la Goutte d'Or, 18th arrondissement
- Location: Paris, France
- Coordinates: 48.8852894°N 2.3509884°E
- Type: Brothel

Construction
- Closed: 1921

The Lanterne Verte (Fr. Green Lantern) was a brothel in Paris. It was located on the corner of Rue de Chartres and Rue de la Goutte d'Or in the Goutte d'Or district in the 18th arrondissement, and was one of the more moderate brothels of Paris. The unusual thing about this brothel was that it had no rooms. The writer and poet Sylvain Bonmariage describes it in his book Gagneuses as follows:

"The Lanterne Verte was a brothel; it was declared as such, and in its large hall, furnished as a cafe, naked girls served the offer of the house. A schoppen white wine cost a franc and who wanted to fuck with the girls or wank one, the waitress was paid forty sous. Everything happened on a bench or chair of the establishment: there were no rooms. Customers entering were usually surprised at two or three pairs who were just in full swing. This Lanterne Verte was a prosperous business; each waitress served thirty customers on average between twelve o'clock and five o'clock in the morning, which brought her sixty francs".

In contrast to other brothels of Paris, such as Le Fourcy, the prostitutes were treated more justly there.

"[...] a quarter of them gave off the Puffmutter. The daily wages of a worker were then at most ten francs!"

But it was not all good in the green lantern:

"The chairs were in broken condition, [...]"

The Lanterne Verte was closed in 1921.

== See also ==
- Prostitution in France
- Parisian Brothels
- Le Fourcy
