= Zone réservée =

Area within German-occupied France in World War II

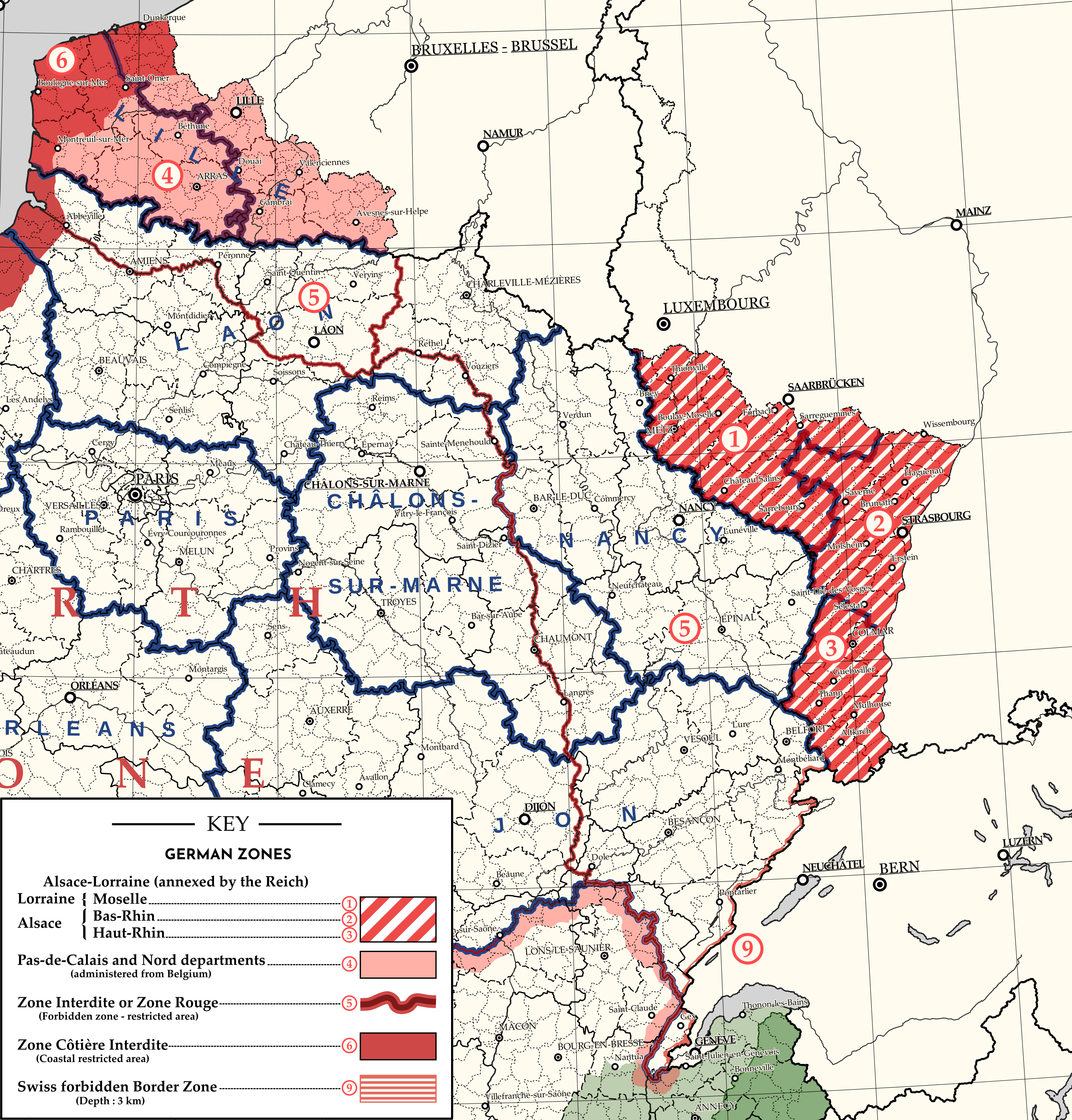
Reserved Zone (Zone réservée) in northeastern France.

The zone réservée (French; lit. 'reserved zone') was an administrative area within German–occupied France during World War II.

A vast expanse of territory in northern and eastern parts of occupied France comprising a total of five départements and parts of five others running from the mouth of the Somme to the Swiss frontier in the Jura was separated from the rest of the Occupied Zone by a demarcation line and was effectively isolated from the rest of France.

Although also referring to a separate occupation zone, the terms zone réservée and zone interdite were often used interchangeably, but some sources distinguish a smaller forbidden zone, comprising parts of Somme, Aisne and Ardennes départements, from the larger reserved zone. This extra demarcation line seems to have been theoretical only.

Although Adolf Hitler did not initially have plans to expand territorially in France except for the return of the formerly German Alsace–Lorraine, the total German hegemony gained after the Battle of France enabled him to plan the annexation of regions of France deemed strategically or economically important.

This was especially true of frontier regions, the incorporation of which could be justified on the basis of historical Franco-German borders. At the end of May 1940 (before the Armistice), Hitler instructed Wilhelm Stuckart, State Secretary in the Ministry of Interior, to make proposals for a new western frontier. A memorandum written on 14 June 1940 by Stuckart or someone close to him in the Interior Ministry discusses the annexation of certain areas which had been part of the historic German Holy Roman Empire in Eastern France to the German Reich. The document presents a plan to weaken France by reducing the country to its late medieval borders with the Holy Roman Empire and re-Germanizing the populace of the region, whom Hitler considered "in reality German", while he also planned to have these annexed territories settled with German settlers. This memorandum formed the basis for the so-called "North-east line" (also known as the "Black line" and the "Führer line"), which marked the territorial extent of the forbidden zone.

On 28 June 1940, the zone was closed, because of devastation caused by heavy fighting during the German campaign. The refugees who had fled the German advance during the Battle of France were not initially allowed to return to the territory, but passes were gradually issued for workers in short-staffed occupations. After August 1940, the land of farmers who had not returned to the zone was confiscated by the Ostdeutsche Landbewirtschaftungsgesellschaft ("East German Land Management Company") which managed confiscated Polish farmland. The company used the name Westland in the forbidden zone, and by the summer of 1942 was managing some 4 million hectares of farmland. Land redistribution to German peasants was however not immediately possible because of the limited quantity of potential settlers, a problem exacerbated by the ever-increasing manpower needs of the Wehrmacht. In any event, the German forces guarding the line were insufficient in number to prevent the return of the territory's inhabitants, and thus by the end of 1940 only about a million of them were still missing (amounting roughly to one-seventh of the pre-war population).

After the start of Operation Barbarossa in June 1941, the German ambitions to expand the Reich westward beyond annexation of Alsace-Lorraine and Luxembourg were temporarily abandoned. The war with the USSR brought vast casualties in the East. Hitler, who had always believed Germany's destiny lay in the east, lost interest in diverting German resources from the East in an effort to colonize what he believed to be Romanized German land. During the night of 17–18 December 1941, the German troops guarding the line were simply withdrawn, as the military commander of France Otto von Stülpnagel decided that diverting increasingly limited German manpower to guard a line that he deemed as being merely illusory (since most of the population had returned) could no longer be justified. Nevertheless, in theory the line continued to exist for the rest of the German occupation.
