= Le Fourcy =

Brothel in Paris

- Location in Paris
- Address: Saint-Paul district, 4th arrondissement
- Location: Paris, France
- Coordinates: 48.8549246°N 2.3571099°E
- Type: Brothel

Construction
- Closed: 1946

Le Fourcy was the most famous mass brothel of Paris, a so-called Maison d'abattage. It was located in the Saint-Paul district in the 4th arrondissement at 10 rue de Fourcy, and was notorious for treating its women very badly. In his book Le Petit Simonin, novelist Albert Simonin wrote:

"The Fourcy in the district of Saint-Paul, the most famous of the Paris maisons d'abattage, demanded 5.50 francs per session. "Five francs per lady and room," as if it were a chorus's chorus, who goes to the room? "The ten sous (fifty centimes), which were asked for as a supplement to the five francs, is not a tip, but a tariff for the towel attracted so many customers on working days that some ladies who were not too bad, were anything but unemployed and able to cope with seventy sessions."

Since the rooms on the first floor, the prostitutes and customers were always encouraged to use the right side of the stairs to lose as little time as possible.

In 1947 the former employee Emile G. told some anecdotes from the house, among other things how was billed:

"After the last suitor went, I swept and rinsed the glasses. The patron counted the girls takings. He fetched the 1-numbered box of pink cardboard and shouted: "No. 1!" (the boxes were numbered and arranged behind him in a shelf). The girl with the number 1 got herself off the counter and went to the boss. Monsieur Maurice opened the box, into which Madame had put five francs at each session of the girl. "One hundred twenty toads, twenty-four customers, not exactly brilliant, you will not stay here for long if you do not work better." Of the hundred and twenty francs, he took forty off for "for dinner," and gave her half of the rest. In the Fourcy, the iron rule was that the girls had to share their humble drinking with the patron. Marchel Maurice said, "Do not try to cheat me, my wife will search you!". After he had settled with number one, he cried: "number two!" After the counting: "Two hundred and fifty-five toads, forty-nine stitches, not bad, but you could work even better." Then it was number 3, number 4 and so on until he finally settled with number 18. When the lights were finally dimmed, the girls ran home to their chaps. Every evening the same game."

Le Fourcy was closed in 1946 because of the ban on bordellos (loi Marthe Richard).

== Facts and figures ==
- Staff: 18 women
- Prices: 5.50 francs per guest (For comparison: a good meal in a high-end restaurant cost 5 francs)
- Working hours: 9am to 2am
- Average per woman: 35 guests peak up to 70
- Average time per guest: 7.5 minutes
- Equipment of the brothel: room with a small bed, table, laundry bowl and jug,
- Service for women: linen change once a month

== See also ==
- Prostitution in France
- Lanterne Verte
- Parisian Brothels
