= Collaborationism in France during the Second World War =

1980 book by Bertram M. Gordon

- Title page for Collaborationism in France during the Second World War (1980)
- Author: Bertram M. Gordon
- Language: English
- Subject: World War II
- Genre: History, non-fiction
- Publisher: Cornell University Press
- Publication date: 1980
- Pages: 424
- ISBN: 978-0801412639

Collaborationism in France during the Second World War is a book written by Bertram M. Gordon and published by Cornell University Press. The book explores the collaboration between French citizens and the Nazi German regime during World War II.

== Reviews ==
- Irvine, William D. (1982). "Reviewed work: Collaborationism in France during the Second World War, Bertram M. Gordon". The Journal of Modern History. 54 (2): 380–382. doi:10.1086/244163. JSTOR 1906187.
- Milward, Alan S. (1981). "Reviewed work: Collaborationism in France during the Second World War, Bertram M. Gordon". The International History Review. 3 (4): 601–604. JSTOR 40105188.
- Knipping, Franz (1990). "Reviewed work: Collaborationism in France during the Second World War, Bertram M. Gordon". Historische Zeitschrift. 250 (2): 482–483. JSTOR 27627110.
- Smith, Murray (1981). "Reviewed work: Collaborationism in France during the Second World War, Bertram M. Gordon". The Annals of the American Academy of Political and Social Science. 454: 220–221. JSTOR 1044270.
- Peyre, Henri (1982). "Reviewed work: Collaborationism in France during the Second World War, Bertram M. Gordon". The French Review. 55 (5): 690–691. JSTOR 390873.
- Watson, D. R. (1983). "Reviewed work: Collaborationism in France during the Second World War, Bertram M. Gordon". The English Historical Review. 98 (389): 937–938. doi:10.1093/ehr/XCVIII.CCCLXXXIX.937. JSTOR 567896.

== Citation ==
- Gordon, B. M. (1980). Collaborationism in France During the Second World War. Cornell University Press.

== Similar or related works ==
- Passivity, Resistance, and Collaboration: Intellectual Choices in Occupied Shanghai, 1937—1945 by Poshek Fu
- Vichy France: Old Guard and New Order, 1940-1944 by Robert O. Paxton

== See also ==
- Collaboration with the Axis powers
- Vichy France
