= Brothels in Paris =

Venues for indoor prostitution in Paris, France

The authorities of medieval Paris attempted to confine prostitution to a particular district. Louis IX (1226–1270) designated nine streets in the Beaubourg Quartier where it would be permitted. In the early part of the 19th century, state-controlled legal brothels (then known as "maisons de tolérance" or "maisons closes") started to appear in several French cities. By law, they had to be run by a woman (typically a former prostitute), and their external appearance had to be discreet. The maisons were required to light a red lantern when they were open (from which is derived the term red-light district), and the prostitutes were only permitted to leave the maisons on certain days and only if accompanied by its head. By 1810, Paris alone had 180 officially approved brothels.

During the first half of the 20th century, some Paris brothels, such as le Chabanais and le Sphinx, were internationally known for the luxury they provided.

France outlawed brothels in 1946, after a campaign by Marthe Richard. At that time there were 1,500 of them across the country, with 177 in Paris alone. The backlash against them was in part due to their wartime collaboration with the Germans during the occupation of France. Twenty-two Paris brothels had been commandeered by the Germans for their exclusive use; some had made a great deal of money by catering for German officers and soldiers. One brothel in the Montmartre District of the French capital was part of an escape network for POWs and shot-down airmen.

== Luxury brothels ==
=== Le Chabanais ===
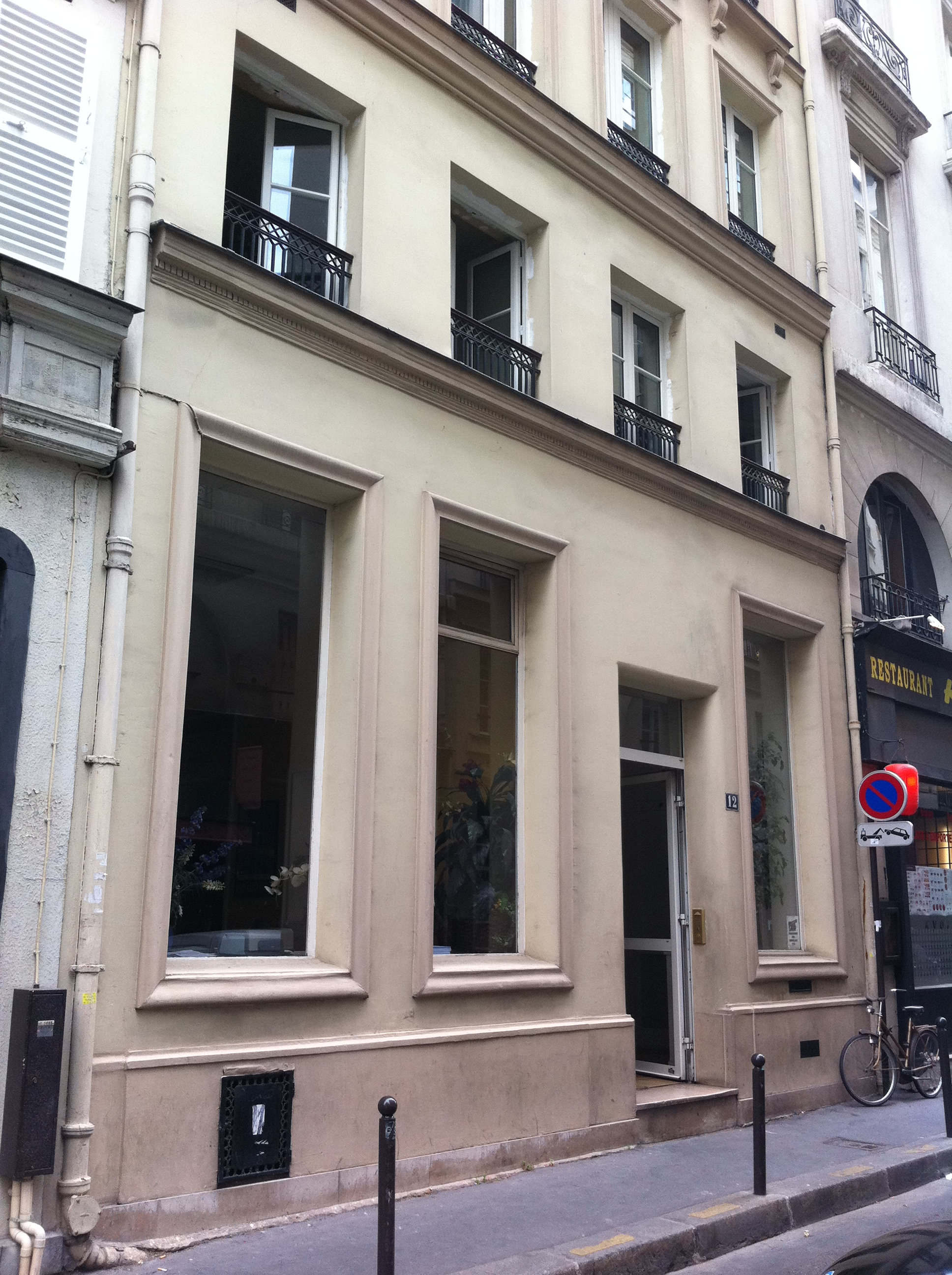
12 rue Chabanais in 2011

Le Chabanais was one of the best known and most luxurious brothels in Paris, operating near the Louvre at 12 rue Chabanais from 1878 until 1946, when brothels were outlawed in France. It was founded by the Irish-born Madame Kelly, who was closely acquainted with several members at the Jockey-Club de Paris. Among the habitués were Edward VII, Prince of Wales; Toulouse-Lautrec; Cary Grant; Humphrey Bogart, Mae West, and diplomatic guests of the French government.

The brothel, famous enough to warrant mentioning in the 7-volume Nouveau Larousse illustré encyclopaedia of 1904, was founded by the Irish-born Madame Kelly (real name – Alexandrine Joannet (or possibly Jouannet)), who was closely associated with several members at the prestigious Jockey-Club de Paris. She sold shares in the profitable business to wealthy anonymous investors. The total cost of the establishment was reported to be the exorbitant sum of 1.7 million francs. The entrance hall was designed as a bare stone cave; the bedrooms were lavishly decorated, many in their own style: Moorish, Hindu, Japanese, Pompeii and Louis XVI. The Japanese room won a design prize at the 1900 World Fair in Paris. Madame Kelly died in 1899.

=== La Fleur blanche ===
La Fleur blanche was a famous maison close (brothel) in the city of Paris, located at 6 rue des Moulins in the 1st Arrondissement. The property was also known as rue des Moulins and was famous for its torture room.

It was one of the most luxurious brothels in Paris. Its clientele included kings, crown princes, members of the aristocracy, and numerous heads of state.

The brothel was known for its extremely lavish bedrooms, each one having its own theme, for example one was in a Moorish style, another was ducal.

La Fleur blanche was notably frequented by Toulouse-Lautrec (where he had a room, according to legend), He was called The Coffee Pot by the girls due to his small size.

The artist painted Griserie the beautiful stranger on a wall in the brothel. The brothel also gave inspiration for forty paintings and drawings, including Mills Street Fair (1894), The Sofa (1894) and Ces dames au réfectoire (1893).

=== L'Étoile de Kléber ===
L'Étoile de Kléber was a maison close (brothel) in Paris. It obtained notoriety for continuing to run after the 1946 Loi Marthe Richard ban on brothels. It continued its operations for a while in secret. It was located at 4 Rue Paul-Valéry in the 16th Arrondissement. It was founded and managed by a Aline Soccodato, known as Madame Billy. Its clients included King Farouk and Maurice Chevalier.

During the German occupation customers were officers of the German army and of the French Gestapo, whose headquarters were only a short distance away at 93 Rue Lauriston, but this was an advantage inasmuch as they had meat, caviar and champagne which was transferred to L'Étoile's kitchen

After the war occupation clientele changed, and there were more and more allied officers in the L'Étoile de Kléber. The Soccodatos had hidden escaped British military, resistance fighters and Jews in the war and forwarded encrypted messages to the French Resistance.

=== One-Two-Two ===
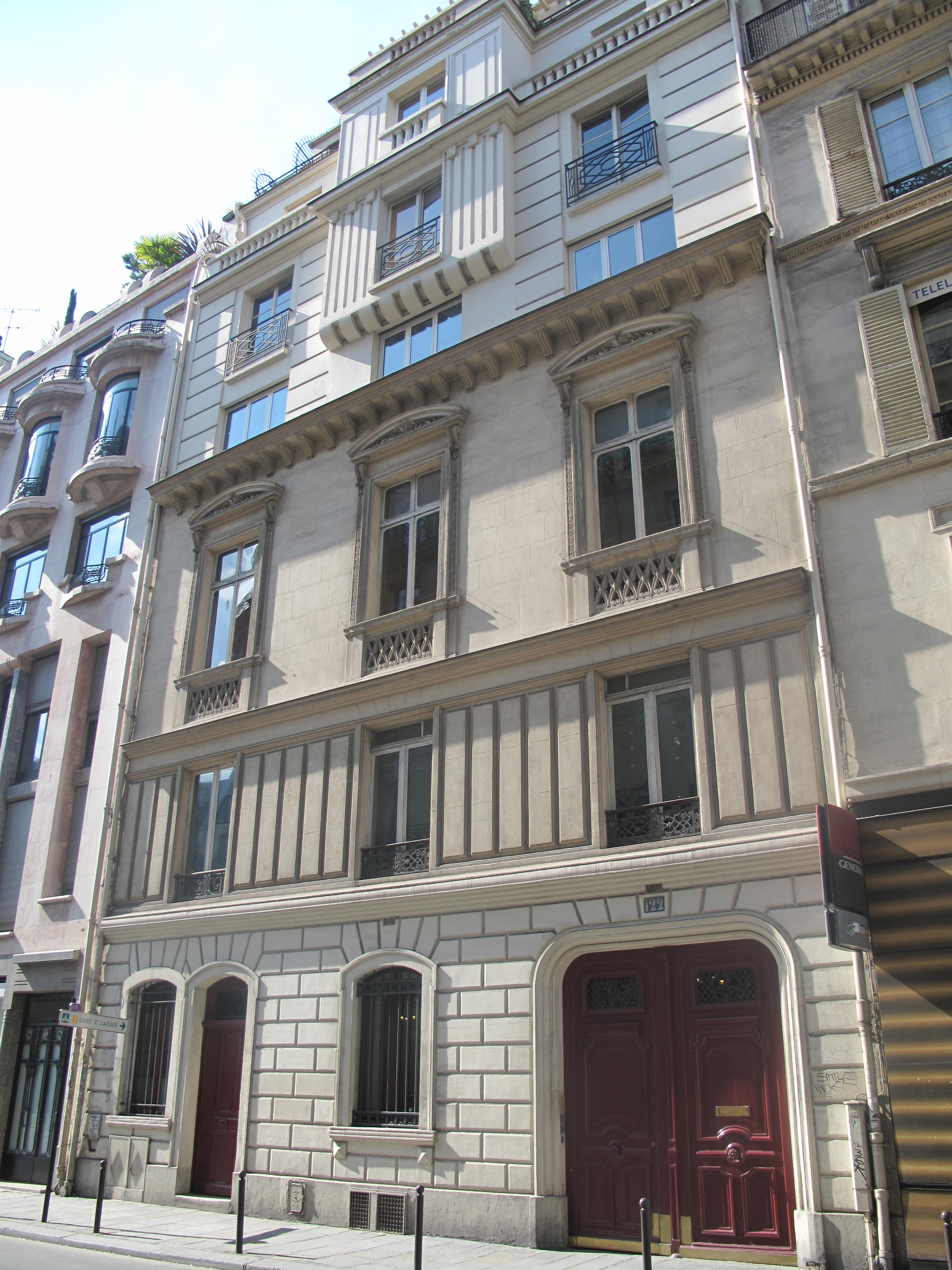
The One-Two-Two building in 2009

The One-Two-Two was one of the most luxurious and illustrious brothels of Paris in the 1930s and 1940s. The name was taken from the address, 122 Rue de Provence, 8th arrondissement of Paris. The numbers were translated into English to ensure that foreign tourists would be able to find the brothel and as a password for French people.

The One-Two-Two was opened in 1924 by Marcel Jamet and his first wife Fernande, who called herself Doriane, a former woman of another brothel in Paris, Le Chabanais. Doriane, through her husband, acquired 122 Rue de Provence. At first, she employed only three women.

The building had twenty-two themed rooms. Forty to sixty-five prostitutes worked for 300 clients per day. It was open from 4:00 pm to 4:00 am. The girls of the establishment had four sex-sessions a day at twenty francs each, excluding tips, and two sessions on Sunday. There was also a bar, a refectory for girls, and a doctor's office.

=== Raspoutine ===
At 58 rue de Bassano. Once a luxury brothel frequented by Serge Gainsbourg, it is now a nightclub. Taking its name from the famous mystic Grigori Rasputin, it had a rich Russian-Baroque decorations designed by the artist Erté, who also designed costumes for the Folies Bergère. It is listed as a Historic Monument.

=== Le Sphinx ===
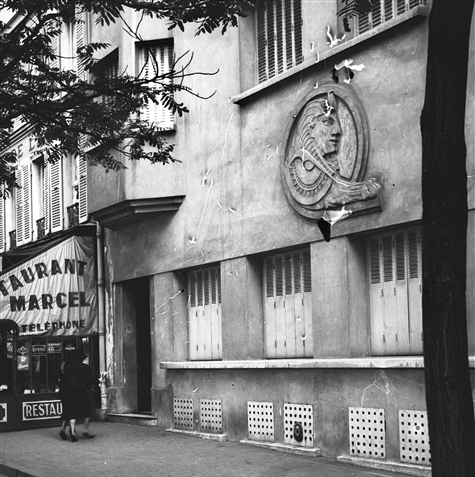
Le Sphinx facade

Le Sphinx was a maison close (brothel) in Paris in the 1930s and 1940s. Along with the "Le Chabanais" and "One-Two-Two" it was considered one of the most luxurious and famous Parisian brothels. It was the first luxury brothel and opened on the left bank of the Seine. Because of its location in the triangle of "literary" cafés (La Coupole, Rotonda and the Cafe du Dome) in Montparnasse, was popular with literary and artistic bohemians.

"Le Sphinx" was not a brothel in the usual sense of the word. The main attraction in it was not in the richly decorated rooms with air conditioning and nickel-plated beds, but in the dance bar on the first floor, where you could also get a haircut or a pedicure. There were normally 15 girls, selected by the madame, in the bar. However, no one forced them to have sex with the clients; the girl decided themselves. Some Sphinx workers never engaged in prostitution, but worked as "hostesses", receiving commission from drinks consumed by guests. Probably this feature of the Sphinx made it so popular among French bohemians of that time.

== Maisons d'abattage ==
Nicknamed maisons d'abattage, these brothels catered to the masses. The clients took numbered tickets and lined up for their turn. The prostitutes would service 60 to 100 clients a day. The girls were often abused by the clients or by the Brigade de répression du proxénétisme, whose job was to find unlicensed prostitutes and brothels.

=== Le Fourcy ===
Le Fourcy was the most famous mass brothel of Paris, a so-called Maison d'abattage. It was located in the Saint-Paul district in the 4th arrondissement at 10 rue de Fourcy, and was notorious for treating its women very badly. In his book Le Petit Simonin, novelist Albert Simonin wrote: "The Fourcy in the district of Saint-Paul, the most famous of the Paris maisons d'abattage, demanded 5.50 francs per session. "Five francs per lady and room," as if it were a chorus's chorus, who goes to the room? "The ten sous (fifty centimes), which were asked for as a supplement to the five francs, is not a tip, but a tariff for the towel attracted so many customers on working days that some ladies who were not too bad, were anything but unemployed and able to cope with seventy sessions."

=== Lanterne Verte ===
The Lanterne Verte (Fr. Green Lantern) was located on the corner of Rue de Chartres and Rue de la Goutte d'Or in the Goutte d'Or district in the 18th arrondissement, and was one of the more moderate brothels of Paris. The unusual thing about this brothel was that it had no rooms. The writer and poet Sylvain Bonmariage describes it in his book Gagneuses: "The Lanterne Verte was a brothel; it was declared as such, and in its large hall, furnished as a cafe, naked girls served the offer of the house. A schoppen white wine cost a franc and who wanted to fuck with the girls or wank one, the waitress was paid forty sous. Everything happened on a bench or chair of the establishment: there were no rooms. Customers entering were usually surprised at two or three pairs who were just in full swing. This Lanterne Verte was a prosperous business; each waitress served thirty customers on average between twelve o'clock and five o'clock in the morning, which brought her sixty francs".

In contrast to other brothels of Paris, such as Le Fourcy, the prostitutes were treated more justly there.

=== Le Moulin Galant ===
In the rue de Fourcy was Le Moulin Galant, it was reserved for the homeless. The brothel consisted of two parts: The Deputies Chamber, where the cost was 10 francs for 5 minutes, and the Senate where the charge was 15 francs.
Also known as Le Fourcaga.

== Gay brothels ==
=== Hotel Marigny ===
Famed novelist Marcel Proust was a frequent patron of gay brothels and invested in two of Paris' specialist maisons closes for gay men. One of these was l'hôtel Marigny, established in 1917 at 11 rue de l'Arcade in the 2nd arrondissement. Proust would visit under an alias almost daily. He made a deal with the brothel managers to spy on the clients through a small window. These experiences would later appear in his writing.

Premises suspected of being gay brothels, including the Hotel Marigny, were however subject to frequent police raids by the groupe des homos, a special police squad formed by Napoleon III.

Hotel Marigny was notorious for supplying minors for adult men. During a raid in 1918 the police arrested 24 underage boys and 24 adult males, including Proust.

== Specialist brothels ==
=== Abbey ===
The Abbey was a brothel catering for Clergymen in rue Saint-Sulpice. Alphonse Boudard wrote of it: "The rooms were laid out based on what was going to happen. The room of torture, with a cross of Saint-André ... the crucifix would have been too sacrilegious ... various pincers, hooks and chains, a gallows for lovers of rope neck as it seems that a certain moment the hanging causes an erection ... Let's go to the room from Satan ... a taste of hell. The patient was received by devils who gave him no respite. It was mistreated there too, but also with the feeling of damnation ... One of the rooms was called the sacristy ... that was self-evident. A confessional was apart in the recess of a room lined with red. A place often asked where the roles were sometimes reversed ... This gave rise to surprises ... the girl was naked or in cassock according to the wishes of the client ... "

=== Chez Christiane ===
Chez Christiane was an SM dungeon. The neo-gothic facade hid endless nights of inquisition reenactments. Collars, chastity belts, whips, chains and even a St. Andrew's Cross were fixtures here. The 1935 'Guide to Love Houses and Secret Museums' noted "Nothing is missing, iron collar, handcuffs, easel, chains and even gibbet. Here imagination can dream of the dark tragedies of the inquisition. The amateur, without great harm, gives himself the illusion of being a victim ... or executioner".

Chez Christiane was listed in the infamous 19th-century sex tourism guide Le Guide Rose as a place famous for fetishes and "special passions". Frequented by very rich French businessmen, royalty and plenty of artists, any fantasy at all could be bought here, no matter how dark, however the girls and the games were not cheap.

At 9 Rue de Navarin, it was directly opposite the Hotel Amour.

=== The Japanese Girls ===
Little information is known about this brothel but its name suggests the prostitutes were Asian.

=== The Medieval ===
32 Rue de Navarin was the location of one of Paris's specialized brothels. Mademoiselle Douska was one of the dominant madams there and was famous for the equipment she would often hide in her clothing to use on clients.

The facilities included a dungeon, cold stone rooms, a 'church' where black masses would be said and other BDSM equipment such as whips, chains and cuffs.

The site is now a convenience store.

=== Miss Betty's ===
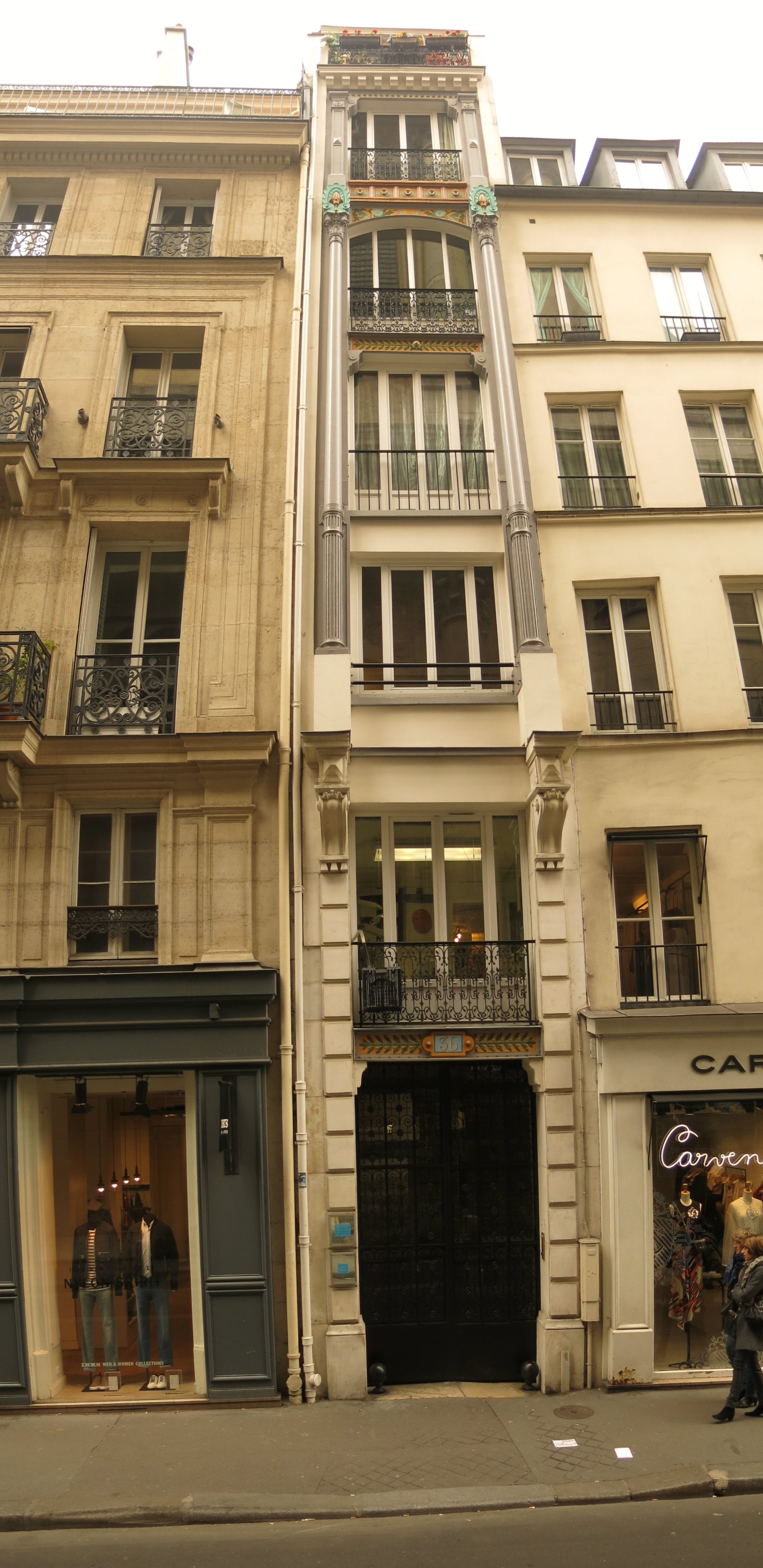
Rue Saint Sulpice, Miss Betty's was on the 2nd floor

Miss Betty's brothel, located on the second floor of 36 Rue Saint Sulpice, specialised in dominatrix role-play including erotic asphyxia, it offered a "crucifixion parlor" and a Satan's Hell torture room.

The brightly coloured house numbers of Parisian houses was usually a clue as to what lay beyond the gates – this house in particular has a gaudy gold and blue number decoration sitting above the thick wrought iron gates to help guide the curious towards it. Inside the gate the mosaic floor tiles carry the name of the former Madame.

=== The Oriental Palace ===
Little information is known about this brothel but its name suggests the prostitutes were Asian.

=== Temple of Peeping Toms ===
The Temple of Peeping Toms at 31 Cite d'Antin was, as its name suggests, a venue for voyeurs. The writer Louis-Ferdinand Céline was a frequent visitor

== Brothels now used as hotels ==
=== Hotel Amour ===
At 8 Rue de Navarin is the Hotel Amour which is now run as a boutique hotel spread over five stories. Back in the 19th century this spacious building was a popular upmarket brothel. Its former use is used as a theme for the hotel. Whilst it was used as a brothel it had a reputation for having the happiest prostitutes in the city. It had a medieval-themed chamber, equipped with iron shackles, a rack and a St Andrew's cross.

There is an iconic picture of the brothel with a naked women at each window, enticing the clients to enter.

=== Hotel Rotary ===
Located at 4 Rue de Vintimille is the Hotel Rotary. It's now a chic boutique hotel but back in the 19th century it was a luxurious brothel. It is located near the Moulin Rouge so was popular with those who liked to mix in theatrical circles. Many prostitutes were 'actresses' just waiting for their break, so the male visitors here were enjoyed good service, in case they were important enough to forward their career on the stage.

=== Maison Souquet ===
Located at 10, rue de Bruxelles in Paris, on the outskirts of Montmartre, Mme. Souquet created a discrete maison close (brothel) in 1905, perfectly echoing the Parisian customs and aesthetics of the Belle Époque period.

From 1907 onwards, Maison Souquet became a regular hotel. It is now a 5-star hotel, part of Maisons Particulieres Collection (hotel group) and decorated by the French designer Jacques Garcia.

== Other brothels ==
=== '4' ===
Very little is known about the brothel "4" located at 4 rue de Hanovre

=== '106' ===
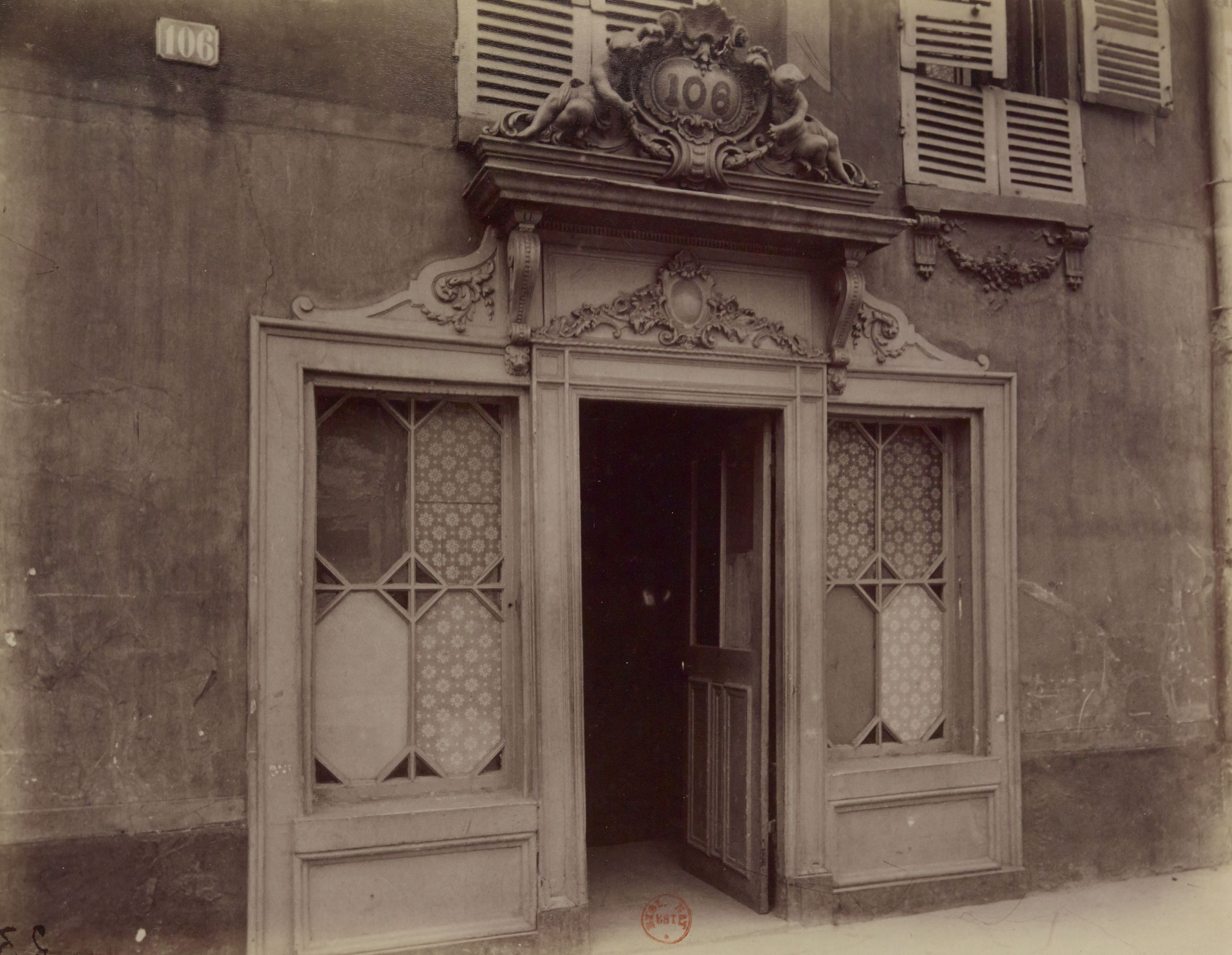
'106' c1910

The '106' was located at 106 Avenue de Suffren. It was a 'third class' maison de tolérance and most of its clientele came from the nearby École Militaire.

On May 12, 1918, a man was stabbed to death in the brothel. The owner, Edward Geslin, and six others were arrested for his murder. The French communist resistance, under "Colonel Fabien", attacked the brothel on February 5, 1942, when members of the German army were inside.

=== Alys ===
Located at 15 rue Saint-Sulpice, it had the name of the owner, Alys, on the floor of the entrance and in the mosaics of the hammam on the 2nd floor.

=== Aux Belles Poules ===
The Aux Belles Poules (French: literally to beautiful hens, poule is a colloquialism for prostitutes) was a well-known Parisian maison close (brothel), established at 32–34 Rue Blondel in the 2nd Arrondissement.

A special attraction of the establishment was that the women employed there staged small erotic shows, with which they proved special craftsmanship in the application of their vulva. The writer Henri Calet describes this in his book La Belle Lurette, published in 1935: The ladies won forty sous at a game; we had to put the coins on the table edges, while the ladies "sucked" them with the slit of their belly [...]

The brothel was also known for its tableaux vivants, in which erotic scenes were portrayed by women who were partly equipped with strap-ons.

=== Brasserie du Moulin ===
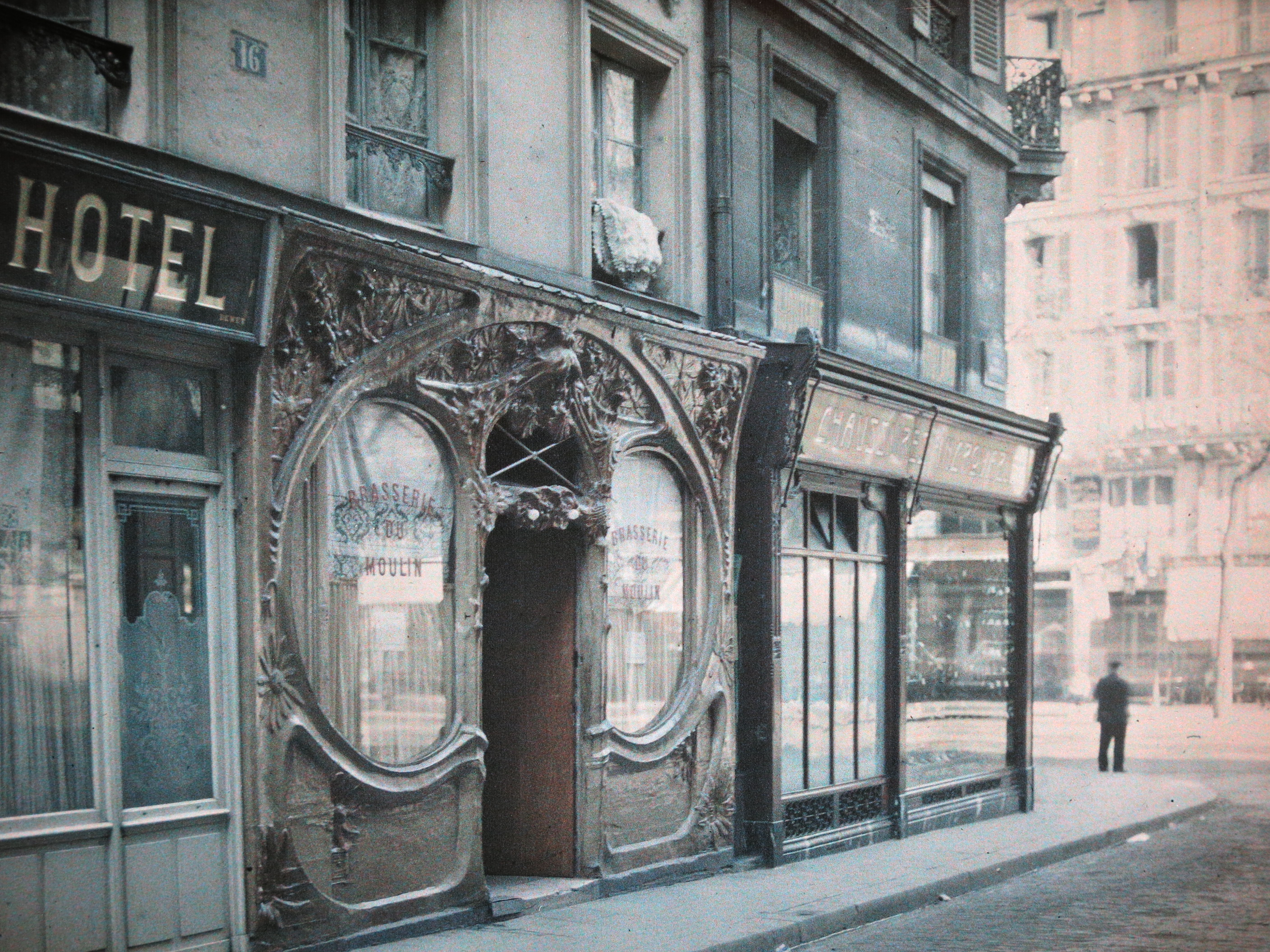
Brasserie du Moulin facade c1920

The Brasserie du Moulin was situated at 16 rue Blondel, Paris. The facade has curved floral art nouveau decoration.

=== Chez Marguerite ===
Located at 50 rue Saint-Georges, Chez Marguerite had a large painting of the abduction of a naked Sabine on the stairs, and a sculpture of a woman in an ancient tunic.

=== Dirty Dick ===
The brothel at 10 Rue Frochot first opened in 1934. It was popular with Allied soldiers during the Second World War. Since the closure of the Paris brothels in 1946 it continued to operate as a sex club filled with cabins for lap dances and provided 'other services'.

In 2013 it was converted into a bar.

=== La Cigarette ===
At 3 Rue Racine was a 'brasserie de femmes', La Cigarette. The price charged was not only for whatever the patrons consumed, but included the waitress. It closed in 1906 and was replaced with the Bouillon Racine restaurant.

=== Madame Billy ===
Aline Soccodato, (known as Madame Billy), opened her first house at Rue Cardinet in 1938, called Madame Billy, and soon became very popular. Personalities from the highest circles quickly went to and fro. She later opened L'Étoile de Kléber.

=== Madame Denis ===
Located on rue du Papillon, the basement was themed as harem of Beirut. Writer Maurice Dekobra described a visit to Madame Denis: "Eleven women without veils, lying pell-mell in languid poses, wait at the edge of a luminous pond for dawn with pink fingers. The dances are beginning. The bodies move ..."

=== Madame Gourdan's ===
The house of Marguerite Gourdan was located at 23 rue Dussoubs in the 2nd arrondissement. It opened in 1774 and shut its doors on clients for the last time in 1783. Madame du Barry, King Louis XV's last official mistress (Maîtresse-en-titre), worked here for a while.

=== Taitbout ===
The Taitbout was located at 58 rue Taitbout.

=== Unknown names ===
- 1st arrondissement
  - Located at 9 Rue Jean-Jacques-Rousseau.
  - Located at 39 Rue Sainte-Anne.
  - Located at 11 rue Thérèse.
- 2nd arrondissement
  - Located at 131 Rue d'Aboukir.
  - Located at 8 & 10 rue d'Amboise.
  - Located at 8 Rue Colbert.
  - Located at 43 rue de la Lune. The door and spyhole of brothel are still visible.
  - Located at 12 rue Feydeau.
  - Located at 37 Rue des Petits-Carreaux.
  - Located at 25 rue Sainte-Apolline.
  - Located at 24 Rue Sainte-Foy.
  - Located at 6 Rue de Tracy.
- 4th arrondissement
  - Located at 15 Rue Jean-Beausire.
- 5th arrondissement
  - Located at 23 Rue Maître-Albert.
- 6th arrondissement
  - Located at 27 Rue de l'Échaudé, this brothel was frequented by writers Alfred Jarry and Guillaume Apollinaire in the 19th century.
  - Located at 42 Rue Mazarine.
  - Located at 5 Rue des Quatre-Vents.
- 8th arrondissement
  - Located at 2 rue de Londres.
  - Located at 5 rue de Londres.
  - Located at 92 rue de Provence.
- 9th arrondissement
  - Located at 4 rue Joubert.
  - Located at 16 rue Laferrière.
  - Located at 22 rue Laferrière.
  - Located at 30 rue Laferrière.
  - Located at 14 rue Monthyon.
- 10th arrondissement
  - Located at 106 Boulevard de la Chapelle.
  - Located at 164 Boulevard de la Villette.
  - Located at 214 Boulevard de la Villette.
  - Located at 226 Boulevard de la Villette.
- 11th arrondissement
  - Located at 70 Boulevard de Belleville.
  - Located at 112 Rue de Montreuil
- 12th arrondissement
  - Located at 19 Rue Traversière.
- 14th arrondissement
  - Located at 7 Rue Jolivet.
  - Located at 17 Rue Jolivet.
- 15th arrondissement
  - located at 22 Avenue de Lowendal.
  - Located at 162 Boulevard de Grenelle.
- 17th arrondissement
  - Located at 2 Passage Bessières, Avenue de Clichy.

== Bibliography ==
- Baxter, John (2014). The Golden Moments of Paris: A Guide to the Paris of The 1920s. Museyon. ISBN 9781938450464.
- Buisson, Patrick (2009). 1940-1945 Années érotiques -: Vichy ou les infortunes de la vertu (in French). Albin Michel. ISBN 978-2-226-19664-4.
- Calet, Henri (1935). La belle lurette (in French). Gallimard. ISBN 9782070299232.
- Стефан, Кларк (2013). Париж с изнанки. Как приручить своенравный город [Paris from the underside. How to Train a Wayward City] (in Russian). Рипол Классик. ISBN 9785386055905.
- Jackson, Julian (2009). Living in Arcadia: Homosexuality, Politics, and Morality in France from the Liberation to AIDS. University of Chicago Press. ISBN 9780226389288.
- Regan, Geoffrey (1992). The Guinness Book of Military Anecdotes. Guinness Publishing. ISBN 9780851125190.
- Rossiaud, Jacques (1995). Medieval Prostitution. Wiley. ISBN 978-0-631-19992-2.
- Sebba, Anne (2016). Les Parisiennes: How the Women of Paris Lived, Loved, and Died Under Nazi Occupation. St. Martin's Press. ISBN 9781466849563.
- Simonin, Albert; Cocteau, Jean; Grimault, Paul (1957). Le Petit Simonin illustré - dictionnaire d'argot (in French). Sillage. ISBN 979-1091896283.
