= Zone interdite =

German occupation zone in France during WW2

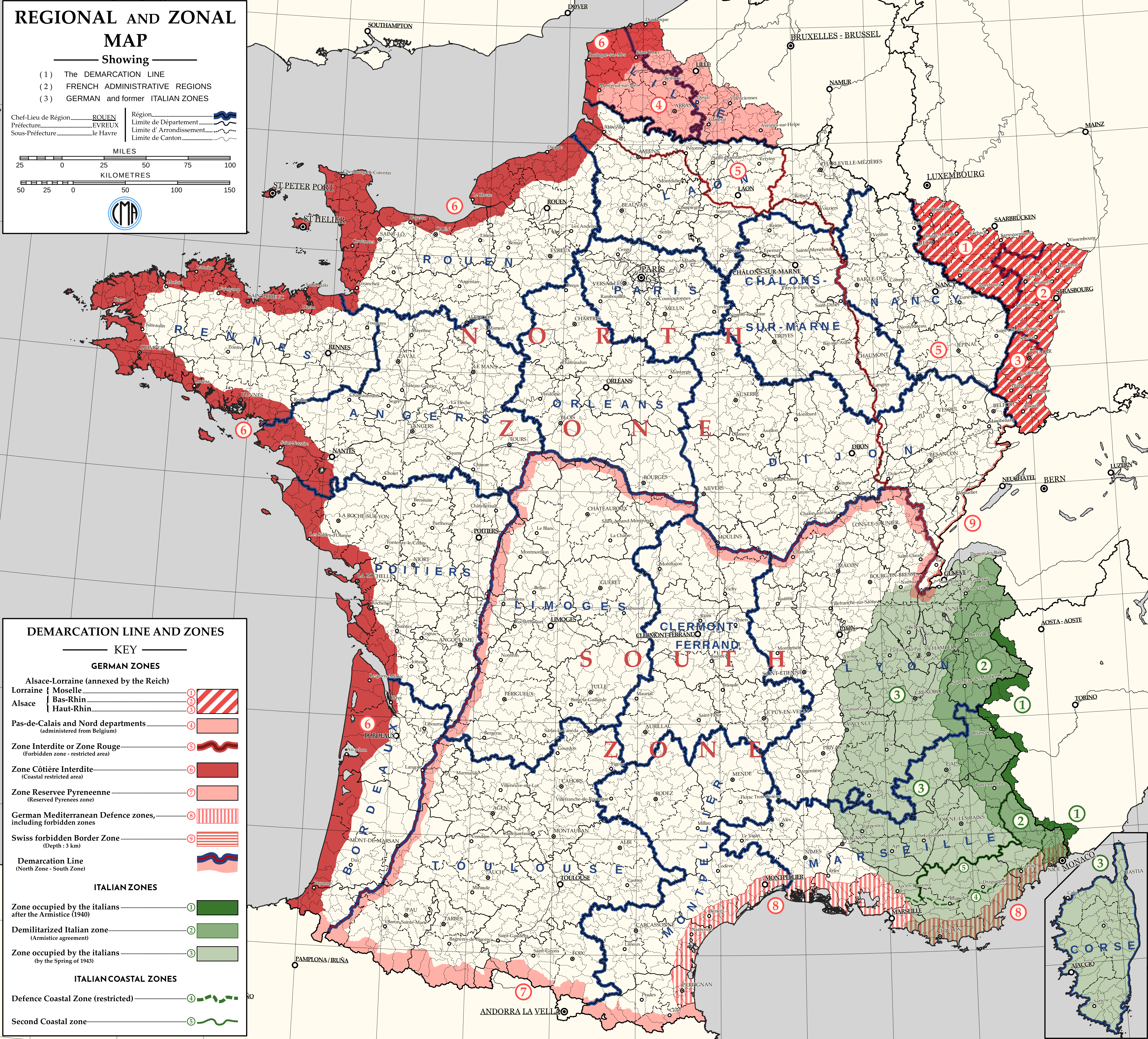
Occupied France during World War II, showing German and Italian occupation zones.

The zone interdite (French; lit. 'forbidden zone') was an administrative area in German–occupied France during World War II along the country's Atlantic coast from Spain to Belgium.

A zone of restricted access to civilians was established to increase the security of the Atlantic Wall. It was 20 km wide and ran along the Atlantic coast from Dunkirk to Hendaye. It was administered by the military administration in Northern France and Belgium (German: Militärverwaltung in Belgien und Nordfrankreich) from Brussels.

Separately, the same term was also sometimes used to refer to the zone réservée (Reserved Zone) in the northeast intended for German settlement.
