= L'Étoile de Kléber =

Brothel in Paris

- L'Étoile de Kléber
- Location in Paris
- Address: 4 Rue Paul-Valéry, 16th Arrondissement
- Location: Paris, France
- Coordinates: 48.87°N 2.2902778°E
- Owner: Madame Billy

Construction
- Opened: 1941

L'Étoile de Kléber was a maison close (brothel) in Paris. It obtained notoriety for continuing to run after the 1946 Loi Marthe Richard ban on brothels. It continued its operations for a while in secret.

L'Étoile de Kléber was located at 4 Rue Paul-Valéry in the 16th Arrondissement. It was founded and managed by Aline Soccodato, known as "Madame Billy". Its clients included King Farouk and Maurice Chevalier.

== The Madame ==
Soccodato was born as Aline Roblot in 1901, in Morey-Saint-Denis. She was orphaned at an early age and left school after primary school. First she worked on a farm and then in 1921, after a short love affair, she became a shop assistant in the Nouvelles Galeries store in Dole. She went to Paris, hoping to earn more as a prostitute. In Paris she met the American billionaire and lesbian Grace Palmier, who introduced her to the higher circles of society and a life of luxury. Grace named Aline Bilitis, referring to the poems of Pierre Louÿs. Bilitis was shortened to "Billy" as a nickname.

== The Brothels ==
Roblot met the singer Soccodato, who appeared under the name of "Josselin" in L'Éuropéen and the Casino de Paris. She lived with him for two years in a wild marriage after they were wed before the mayor of the 16th arrondissement. Aline, who had been working in 'hour hotels' with the knowledge of her partner, had plans for her own brothel. She opened her first house in Rue Cardinet in 1938, called Madame Billy, and it soon became very popular. Personalities from the highest circles quickly went to and fro:

"A former councilor of state played with her "Demoiselle", dressed herself with pantyhose and rustling panties, and slapped with the "maidens", dressed-up girls. She also received a visit from a former Spanish ambassador, so fat that he could be found on his belt the chair if he wanted to get up."

In 1941, her husband was singing at "ABC" and had less time for Aline, so she decided to open a second house in Rue Viellejust (later renamed Rue Paul-Valéry). The new brothel was to be high class. Aline paid 150,000 francs for the takeover and got a four-storey villa with ten rooms, which she furnished with selected furniture. The garden was particularly beautiful. There was a salon with armchairs in the style of Louis XVI, which was full of potted plants. She also ensured that the women who worked for her were of the highest possible level.

"The blonde, seductive Madame Billy knitted behind the bar, watching her band of young, handsome, distinguished girls, some of whom even came from good families."

In the autumn of 1941, Henri Coutet, asked the married couple, with whom he was a friend, to rent rooms on the upper floor to the singer Édith Piaf. So Piaf, with her half-sister Momone, her lover and her musicians, moved into the brothel.

"Piaf: It's expensive with Mother Billy, but you eat at least well."

"At noon she usually ate only a steak that was covered with a lot of garlic. In the evening after her performance, she regularly celebrated and invited friends to come back with her, often more than fifteen. Jean Cocteau, who had written Le Bel Indifférent for her, liked to read his poems to her in the brothel salon, advised her what she was to read, and even gave her a moral education. [...] the guest list one evening: Marie Marquet, Raimu, Mistinguett, Maurice Chevalier, Marie Bell, Madeleine Robinson and Michel Simon."

The salon also hosted private events. For example, in 1942, a Dutch shipowner invited six friends to a very special dinner: Seven large plates were to be served, each with a naked girl sitting in the middle of the meal to be served. The waiters of Maxims had taken over the service and served the plates, on each of which a girl was surrounded with caviar, sole, cheese, fine pastry etc.

In May 1943 Édith Piaf discovered nine young men and presented them to her friend; the group, named Compagnon de la Chanson, was later to become very famous in France. In December 1943 she finally left the brothel.

== The Second World War ==
During the German occupation customers were officers of the German army and of the French Gestapo, whose headquarters were only a short distance away at 93 Rue Lauriston, but this was an advantage inasmuch as they had meat, caviar and champagne which was transferred to L'Étoile's kitchen

After the war occupation clientele changed, and there were more and more allied officers in the L'Étoile de Kléber. The Soccodatos had hidden escaped British military, resistance fighters and Jews in the war and forwarded encrypted messages to the French Resistance. They let their contacts play and were thus fortunate enough to be able to continue their operation and gain influence in the 1946 Law on Closures.

"In my salon [...] writers, journalists, people from film and chanson, representatives of parliament, senate and government met. Members of parliament and senators represented a high proportion of my clientele. Almost all the members of the numerous governments under President Vincent Auriol and René Coty visited my house."

== See also ==
- Prostitution in France
- Parisian Brothels
