= Andreas Daum =

German-American historian

Andreas W. Daum is a German-American historian who specializes in German, European, and transatlantic history.

== Life ==
Daum received his Ph.D. summa cum laude in 1995 from LMU Munich, where he worked with Thomas Nipperdey. He taught for six years as an assistant professor in Munich. In 1996, he joined the German Historical Institute Washington DC as a research fellow and later became the deputy director. From 2001 to 2002, he was a John F. Kennedy Memorial Fellow at the Center for European Studies at Harvard University. Since 2002, Daum has been a professor of European history at the State University of New York (SUNY) at Buffalo and also served as an associate dean for undergraduate education. He was a visiting scholar at the BMW Center for German and European Studies at Georgetown University in 2010–11.

Daum's research covers cultural, political, and transnational topics from the eighteenth to the twentieth centuries. He is known as a biographer of Alexander von Humboldt and for his studies on popular science, emigrants from Nazi Germany, and the United States’ special relationship with "America’s Berlin". His book Kennedy in Berlin highlights the role of emotions in the Cold War and explains John F. Kennedy's 1963 "Ich bin ein Berliner" speech.

In 2019, Daum was awarded the Humboldt Research Prize for international scientists and scholars by the Alexander von Humboldt Foundation. In 2024, he received the Meyerson Award for Distinguished Undergraduate Teaching and Mentoring. He was recognized with the Senior Award for Excellence in International Exchange by the DAAD (German Academic Exchange Service) Alumni Association in 2025.

He has received fellowships and grants from the American Philosophical Society, National Endowment for the Humanities, Smithsonian Institution, Gerda Henkel Foundation, DAAD, and the Studienstiftung des Deutschen Volkes.

== Monographs ==
- Wissenschaftspopularisierung im 19. Jahrhundert: Bürgerliche Kultur, naturwissenschaftliche Bildung und die deutsche Öffentlichkeit, 1848‒1914, Munich: Oldenbourg (1998; 2nd edition 2002), a study on popular science in the 19th century
- Kennedy in Berlin, New York: Cambridge University Press (2007, German edition 2003)
- Alexander von Humboldt: A Concise Biography. Trans. Robert Savage, Princeton: Princeton University Press (2024); in German: Alexander von Humboldt, Munich: C. H. Beck (2019, 2nd edition 2024)

== Edited volumes ==
- America, the Vietnam War and the World: Comparative and International Perspectives, with Lloyd C. Gardner and Wilfried Mausbach, New York: Cambridge University Press (2003)
- Berlin ‒ Washington, 1800‒2000: Capital Cities, Cultural Representations, and National Identities, with Christof Mauch, New York: Cambridge University Press (2005, paperback 2011)
- The Second Generation: Émigrés from Nazi Germany as Historians. With a Biobibliographic Guide, with Hartmut Lehmann and James J. Sheehan, New York: Berghahn Books (2016, paperback 2018)

== Recent Articles ==
- "Ambiguity as Principle: Alexander von Humboldt in the Revolution of 1848." In HiN: Alexander von Humboldt in the Net 26 (2025). https://doi.org/10.18443/378.
- "A 'Temple of Liberty'? Alexander von Humboldt and the French Revolution." In Annals of Science 82 (2025). https://doi.org/10.1080/00033790.2024.2433232 .
- "Humboldtian Science and Humboldt's Science." In History of Science 63 (2024). https://doi.org/10.1177/00732753241252478.
- "Good Bye, Lenin! Coping with Change ‒ and the Future in the Counterfactual." In Deutsche Filmgeschichten (2023).
- "Peter Paret (1924–2020)." In Historische Zeitschrift 314 (2022).
- "Social Relations, Shared Practices, and Emotions: Alexander von Humboldt's Excursion into Literary Classicism and the Challenges to Science around 1800." In Journal of Modern History 91 (2019).
- "German Naturalists in the Pacific around 1800: Entanglement, Autonomy, and a Transnational Culture of Expertise." In Explorations and Entanglements (2019).
- "Georg G. Iggers (1926–2017)." In Central European History 51 (2018).
- "Berlin." In A Companion to John F. Kennedy (2014)
- "The Two German States in the International World." In Oxford Handbook of Modern German History (2011).
- "Varieties of Popular Science and the Transformations of Public Knowledge." In Isis 100 (2009).
- "'Atlantic Partnership' or Simply 'A Mess'? Performative Politics and Social Communication in the Western Alliance during the Kennedy Presidency." In John F. Kennedy and the 'Thousand Days' (2007)
- "Wissenschaft and Knowledge." In Germany 1800–1870 (Short Oxford History of Germany) (2004)
- "America’s Berlin, 1945-2000: Between Myths and Visions." In Berlin: The New Capital in the East (2000)
