= Hartmut Lehmann =

German historian (born 1936)

Hartmut Lehmann (born April 29, 1936) is a German historian of modern history who specializes in religious and social history. He is known for his research on Pietism, secularization, religion and nationalism, transatlantic studies and Martin Luther. He was the founding director of the German Historical Institute Washington DC and was a director of the Max Planck Institute for History. He is an emeritus honorary professor at Kiel University and the University of Göttingen.

== Life and career ==
Born on April 29, 1936, in Reutlingen in Baden-Württemberg, he completed his Abitur at the Nargolder Gymnasium in Nagold in 1955 and was an exchange student in Cortland, New York (1952/1953).

Lehmann first studied history, English, German, political science and philosophy at the University of Tübingen and went on to study at the University of Bristol and Vienna and later again at Tübingen. Lehmann completed his habilitation at the University of Köln under the direction of Adam Wandruszka.

Lehmann was a university lecturer at the University of Köln, a guest professor at the University of California, Los Angeles, and a research fellow at the University of Chicago before becoming a professor at Kiel University. During this time of professorship, Lehmann also had research fellowships and was a guest professor at the Australian National University in Canberra, Princeton University, and Harvard University.

Lehmann moved to Washington, D.C., to become the founding director of the German Historical Institute Washington DC from 1987 to 1993. Lehmann helped the institution gain academic independence and facilitated its incorporation into American academics. Lehmann also became the managing director and was a member of the Max-Planck-Institute for History in the 1990s.

For several years, Lehmann taught as an honorary professor at both Kiel University and the University of Göttingen until his retirement in 2004. Since his retirement, he has been a guest professor at several universities, including Emory University, Dartmouth College, University of California, Berkeley, Pennsylvania State University, and Princeton Theological Seminary.

== Awards ==
- Honorary Member of the American Historical Association (2020)
- Honorary Doctorate in Theology, University of Helsinki (2017)
- Honorary Doctorate in Theology, Lund University (2017)
- Honorary Doctorate in Theology (Dr. theol. h. c.), University of Basel (1999)
- Member of the Göttingen Academy of Sciences and Humanities
- International Honorary Member of the American Academy of Arts and Sciences (1995–present)

== Selected works ==
=== Monographs ===
- Österreich-Ungarn und die belgische Frage im ersten Weltkrieg. 1959 (Dissertation, University of Vienna, 1959).
- Pietismus und weltliche Ordnung in Württemberg vom 17. bis zum 20. Jahrhundert. Kohlhammer, Stuttgart u. a. 1969 (Habilitation, University of Köln, 1967).
- Das Zeitalter des Absolutismus. Gottesgnadentum und Kriegsnot (= Christentum und Gesellschaft. Bd. 9). Kohlhammer, Stuttgart u. a. 1980, ISBN 3-17-005813-4.
- Martin Luther in the American Imagination (= American Studies. Bd. 63). Fink, München 1988, ISBN 3-7705-2478-0.
- Alte und neue Welt in wechselseitiger Sicht. Studien zu den transatlantischen Beziehungen im 19. und 20. Jahrhundert (= Veröffentlichungen des Max-Planck-Instituts für Geschichte. Bd. 119). Vandenhoeck und Ruprecht, Göttingen 1995, ISBN 3-525-35433-9.
- Max Webers „Protestantische Ethik“. Beiträge aus der Sicht eines Historikers (= Kleine Vandenhoeck-Reihe. Bd. 1579). Vandenhoeck und Ruprecht, Göttingen, 1996, ISBN 3-525-33575-X.
- Protestantische Weltsichten. Transformationen seit dem 17. Jahrhundert. Vandenhoeck und Ruprecht, Göttingen 1998, ISBN 3-525-01373-6.
- Protestantisches Christentum im Prozeß der Säkularisierung. Vandenhoeck und Ruprecht, Göttingen 2001, ISBN 3-525-36250-1
- Säkularisierung. Der europäische Sonderweg in Sachen Religion (= Bausteine zu einer europäischen Religionsgeschichte im Zeitalter der Säkularisierung. Bd. 5). Wallstein-Verlag, Göttingen 2004, ISBN 3-89244-820-5 (2., erweiterte Auflage. ebenda 2007, ISBN 978-3-89244-820-4).
- Transformationen der Religion in der Neuzeit. Beispiele aus der Geschichte des Protestantismus (= Veröffentlichungen des Max-Planck-Instituts für Geschichte. Bd. 230). Vandenhoeck & Ruprecht, Göttingen 2007, ISBN 978-3-525-35885-6.
- Die Entzauberung der Welt. Studien zu Themen von Max Weber (= Bausteine zu einer europäischen Religionsgeschichte im Zeitalter der Säkularisierung. Bd. 11). Wallstein-Verlag, Göttingen 2009, ISBN 978-3-8353-0456-7.
- Religiöse Erweckung in gottferner Zeit. Studien zur Pietismusforschung (= Bausteine zu einer europäischen Religionsgeschichte im Zeitalter der Säkularisierung. Bd. 12). Wallstein-Verlag, Göttingen 2010, ISBN 978-3-8353-0597-7.
- Das Christentum im 20. Jahrhundert. Fragen, Probleme, Perspektiven (= Kirchengeschichte in Einzeldarstellungen. Abt. 4: Neueste Kirchengeschichte. Bd. 9). Evangelische Verlags-Anstalt, Leipzig 2012, ISBN 978-3-374-02500-8.
- Luthergedächtnis 1817 bis 2017 (= Refo500. Bd. 8). Vandenhoeck und Ruprecht, Göttingen u. a. 2012, ISBN 978-3-525-55039-7.
- Das Reformationsjubiläum 2017. Umstrittenes Erinnern (= Refo500. Bd. 70). Vandenhoeck und Ruprecht, Göttingen 2021, ISBN 978-3-525-56038-9.

=== Edited volumes ===
- with James J. Sheehan, An Interrupted Past : German-Speaking Refugee Historians in the United States after 1933, Cambridge University Press, Cambridge, 1991.
- with William R. Hutchinson, Many are chosen : divine election and western nationalism, Fortress Press, Minneapolis, 1994.
- with Guenther Roth, Weber's Protestant Ethic: Origins, Evidence, Contexts, Cambridge England: German Historical Institute; Cambridge University Press. 1995.
- with R. Po-Chia Hsia, In and Out of the Ghetto: Jewish-Gentile Relations in Late Medieval and Early Modern Germany Washington D.C. Cambridge: German Historical Institute; Cambridge University Press.
- with Veer Peter van der, Nation and Religion : Perspectives on Europe and Asia. Princeton (New Jersey): Princeton University Press. 1999.
- with Van Horn Melton, James, Paths of Continuity: Central European Historiography from the 1930s to the 1950s Cambridge University Press. 2003.
- with Otto Gerhard Oexle: Nationalsozialismus in den Kulturwissenschaften. 2 Bände. Vandenhoeck und Ruprecht, Göttingen 2004;
- Volume 1: Fächer, Milieus, Karrieren (= Veröffentlichungen des Max-Planck-Instituts für Geschichte. Bd. 200). 2004, ISBN 3-525-35198-4;
- Volume 2: Leitbegriffe – Deutungsmuster – Paradigmenkämpfe. Erfahrungen und Transformationen im Exil (= Veröffentlichungen des Max-Planck-Instituts für Geschichte. Bd. 211). Vandenhoeck & Ruprecht, Göttingen 2004, ISBN 3-525-35862-8.
- with Hermann Wellenreuther, In Search of Peace and Prosperity: New German Settlements in Eighteenth-Century Europe and America, Penn State Press, University Park, 2010.
- with Andreas W. Daum, James J. Sheehan: The Second Generation. Émigrés from Nazi Germany as Historians. With a Biobibliographic Guide. New York 2016, ISBN 978-1-78238-985-9.
- with James Van Horn Melton and Johnathan Strom, Pietism in Germany and North America 1680–1820, London and New York, Routledge, 2019.
