= Global Networks =

- Discipline: Social science
- Language: English
- Edited by: Megha Amrith, Zachary P. Neal, Johanna Waters

Publication details
- History: 2001–present
- Publisher: Wiley
- Frequency: Quarterly
- Impact factor: 2.927 (2020)

Standard abbreviations
- ISO 4: Glob. Netw.

Indexing
- ISSN: 1470-2266 (print); 1471-0374 (web)
- LCCN: 2010250514
- OCLC no.: 556147072

Links
- Journal homepage; Online access; Online archive

Global Networks: A journal of transnational affairs is a quarterly peer-reviewed multidisciplinary academic journal dedicated to the study of globalization and transnationalism. Its focus spans multiple disciplines within social science, including geography, anthropology, and political economy. It was established in 2001 and is published by Wiley. The founding editors-in-chief were Robin Cohen, Alasdair Rogers, and Steven Vertovec. The current editors-in-chief are Megha Amrith (Max Planck Institute for the Study of Religious and Ethnic Diversity), Zachary P. Neal (Michigan State University), and Johanna Waters (University College London). According to the Journal Citation Reports, the journal has a 2020 impact factor of 2.927, ranking it 14th out of 93 journals in the category "Anthropology" and 36th out of 85 journals in the category "Geography".

== Editors-in-chief ==
Past editors-in-chief have been:

- Robin Cohen (2001–2019)
- Alasdair Rogers (2001–2019)
- Steven Vertovec (2001–2019)
- Jonathan Beaverstock (2019–2022)
- Megha Amrith (2022–Present)
- Zachary P. Neal (2022–Present)
- Johanna Waters (2022–Present)

== Special Issues ==
Global Networks regularly publishes special issues addressing a specific topic and organized by guest editors. Recent special issues have included:

- Elites in Transnational Policy Networks. Guest edited by Lasse Folke Henriksen and Leonard Seabrooke (Volume 21, Issue 2, April 2021)
- Multinational Migrations. Guest edited by Anju Mary Paul and Brenda S. A. Yeoh (Volume 21, Issue 2, January 2021)
- After Trust. Guest edited by Magnus Marsden and Paul Anderson (Volume 20, Issue 4, October 2020)
- Theorizing Transnational Labour Markets: Economic-Sociological Approaches. Guest edited by Ursula Mense-Petermann (Volume 20, Issue 3, July 2020)
- Methodological Cosmopolitanism Across The Socio-Cultural Sciences. Guest edited by Anders Blok and Sabine Selchow (Volume 20, Issue 3, July 2020)
