= Marco Martiniello =

Marco Martiniello (born October 15, 1960) is an Italian-Belgian sociologist and political scientist. He teaches sociology of migration and ethnic relations at the University of Liège. He is currently research director at the Belgian National Fund for Scientific Research (F.R.S.-FNRS), and the director of the Centre for Ethnic and Migration Studies (CEDEM)., as well as Vice-Dean for Research at the Faculty of Social Sciences of the University of Liège.

Martiniello holds a B.A. in sociology from the University of Liège and a Ph.D. in social and political sciences from the European University Institute in Florence. He specializes in migration studies, ethnicity, multiculturalism, racism and citizenship in the European Union and in Belgium, and he is the author, editor or co-editor of numerous articles, book chapters, reports and books on these themes. His current research focuses on the integration, political participation and mobilization of immigrant minorities through the arts in super-diverse cities across the world (Belgium, Italy, South Africa, Australia and United States). Along his career, Martiniello has held numerous visiting appointments at New York University, Columbia University, Malmö University, City University of New York, University of Geneva, University of Kwazulu-Natal, University of Queensland, etc.

Besides academic achievements, Martiniello was also awarded with important civic distinctions including the honorary citizenship of the city of Liège in 2015, and the knighthood of the Order of the Star of Italy in 2017.

== Selected publications (books) ==
- Leadership et pouvoir dans les communautés d'origine immigrée, L'Harmattan, 1992.
- Sortir des ghettos culturels, Presses de SciencesPo, 1997.
- Selected Studies in International Migration and Immigrant Incorporation (co-edited with Jan Rath), Amsterdam University Press, 2010.
- La démocratie multiculturelle. Citoyenneté, diversité, justice sociale, Presses de SciencesPo, 2011.
- An Introduction to International Migration Studies. European Perspective (co-edited with Jan Rath), Amsterdam University Press, 2012.
- Penser l'ethnicité Identité, culture et relations sociales, Presses Universitaires de Liège, 2013.
- Multiculturalism and the Arts in European Cities, Routledge, 2014.
