= German Historical Institute Washington DC =

Organization in Washington D.C.

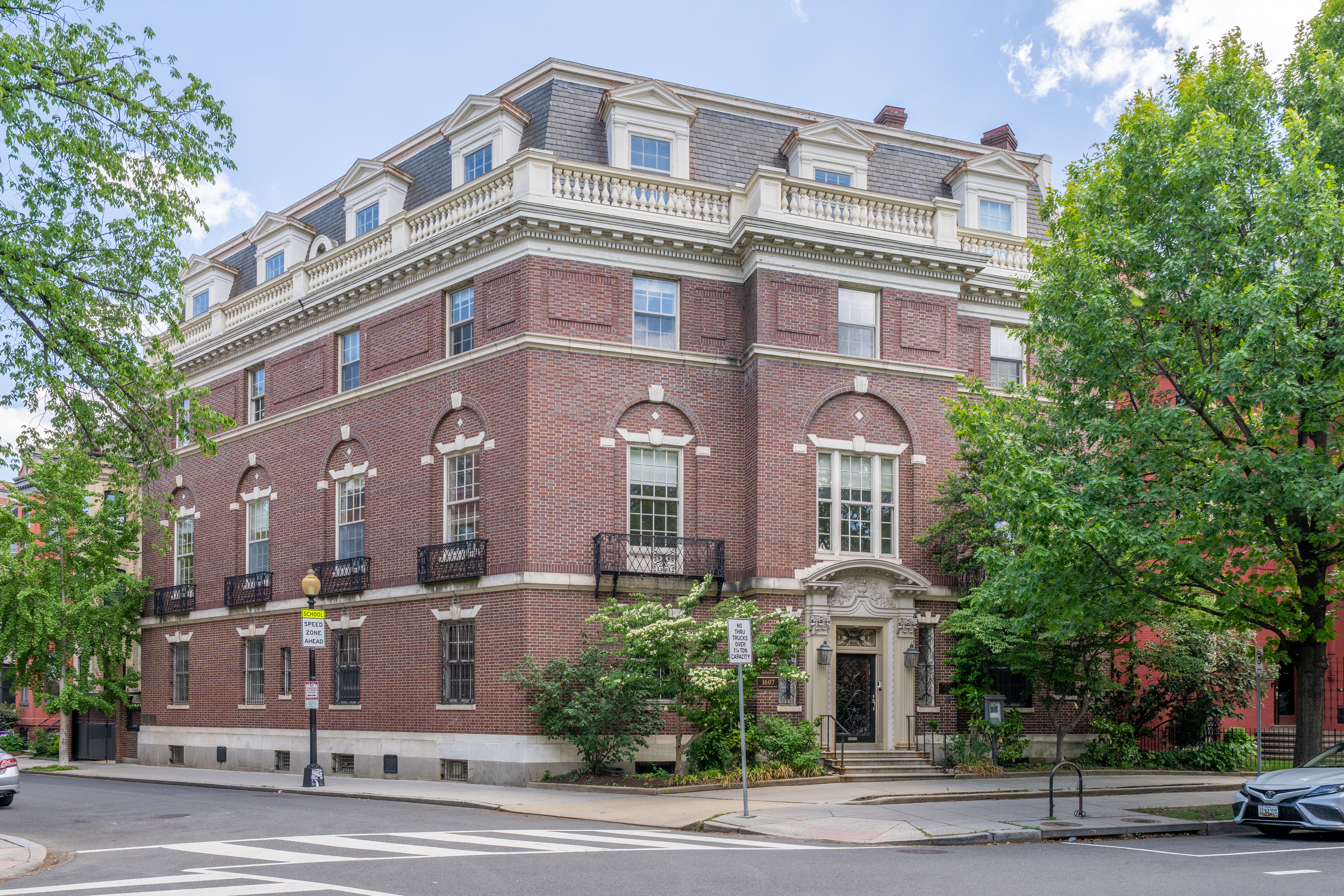
German Historical Institute Washington DC

The German Historical Institute Washington DC is an institute of historical study based in Washington, D.C. It has been part of the Max Weber Foundation: German Humanities Institutes Abroad since 2002. The director is Ulrike von Hirschhausen.

== History ==
The development of a German Historical Institute in America began soon after the establishment of the German Historical Institute London. The German historians Erich Angermann (University of Cologne) and Günter Moltmann (University of Hamburg) and the American historians Gordon Craig (Stanford University) and Gerald Feldman (University of California at Berkeley), Wolfgang Mommsen (director of GHI London), Rudolf Vierhaus (Director of Max Planck Institute for History) and Gerhard A. Ritter (LMU Munich) were part of the initial discussions to inaugurate a new GHI institute in the United States. They developed a proposal that the Minister for Research and Technology and the advisory board of the German Science and Humanities Council in Germany reviewed and which the German cabinet under Helmut Kohl formally accepted.

The GHI Washington DC opened in 1987 with Hermann-Josef Rupieper as director. Historian Hartmut Lehmann became the official founding director a year later and helped establish its academic independence and acceptance into American academia. He initiated conferences, research projects, publications, lecture series, and scholarship programs that became typical of the institute. Since 1991, GHI Washington DC has maintained relations with American scholars through the "Friends of the German Historical Institute." The Federal Ministry for Research and Technology financed the institution as the Stiftung Deutsches Historisches Institut in den Vereinigten Staaten von Amerika. The institute joined the Foundation German Historical Institutes Abroad with institutes in London and Warsaw in 1993 and the DGIA, Foundation German Humanities Institutes Abroad, in 2002. GHI Washington DC became part of the Max Weber Foundation in 2002 and has been funded by the federal government of Germany.

The focus of GHI Washington DC's research and conference programs has reflected the interests of the institute's directors. Under the leadership of Detlef Junker (1994–1999), the GHI devoted itself to the history of the Cold War and international relations. Following the appointment of Christof Mauch as director (1999–2007), the GHI held conferences on "German History in Documents and Images" and "Competing Modernities," supported by the Max Kade Foundation and ZEIT Foundation Ebelin and Gerd Bucerius. Further conferences explored German-American relations and European-American relations and the history of African Americans in Germany. A significant theme in conferences under Mauch was environmental history. The Mauch era also saw the introduction of several public lectures, including the Bucerius Lectures, German Unification Symposia and Feldman Memorial Lectures. Under the direction of Hartmut Berghoff (2008–2015), the institute continued research on transatlantic studies, but focused more on economic history and consumerism.

During her tenure from 2015 to 2025, director Simone Lässig has brought her expertise into the institute's research focus. The institute has concentrated more on international, German, and Central European History in connection to Jewish history. The institute developed an interest in the history of the Americas as a whole and the relations between the Pacific and Atlantic regions. In line with this broader approach, the GHI Washington established a Pacific Office at Berkeley in 2017, emphasizing migrant history.

== Directors ==
The following persons are or have been directors:

- Hartmut Lehmann (1987–1993)
- Detlef Junker (1994–1999)
- Christof Mauch (1999–2007)
- Hartmut Berghoff (2008–2015)
- Simone Lässig (2015-2025)
- Ulrike von Hirschhausen (since 2025)

== Mission ==
The main objectives of the GHI are to advance research, support scholars, and build networks.

The institute's research engages with global, international, and transatlantic themes. The GHI currently furthers research in Jewish history and the themes of history of knowledge, digital history, migrant history and global history.

GHI supports scholars through fellowships for doctoral and postdoctoral students and residential fellowships.

GHI has long sustained relations between German and American scholars. The institute frequently holds conferences that bring together scholars from different countries.

== Notable speakers ==
GHI Washington DC has held lectures and conferences with notable historians and public figures. Natoble guest speakers have included Helmut Schmidt, Joachim Gauck, Joschka Fischer, Gerhard Schröder, Ralf Dahrendorf, Marianne Birthler, Timothy Garton Ash, Rita Süßmuth, Jutta Limbach, Hans Küng, Wolfgang Huber, Michael Blumenthal, Kurt Masur, Kurt Biedenkopf, Jens Reich, Bärbel Bohley, Markus Meckel and Heinz Riesenhuber.

Notable historian speakers have included Heinrich August Winkler, Bernard Bailyn, Wolfgang Mommsen, Felix Gilbert, Stephan Kuttner, Stig Förster, Roger Chickering, Jürgen Kocka, Margaret Lavinia Anderson, and Gerhard A. Ritter.

== Publications ==
GHI publishes the biannual Bulletin of the German Historical Institute that includes reports about the institute's conferences and research, lectures, as well as original research by scholars, GHI fellows, and GHI award recipients. Publications are issued in collaboration with Cambridge University Press. The series editor is the director Simone Lässig.

Publications of the German Historical Institute, in collaboration with Cambridge University Press, includes essays and monographs by scholars connected to the themes and research areas of the institute.

GHI also publishes the series Transatlantic Historical Studies (German: Transatlantische Historische Studien) with Franz Steiner Verlag and Studies in German History with Berghahn Books.

From 2012 to 2020, GHI published Worlds of Consumption with Palgrave Macmillan about consumerism from a transatlantic and global perspective in the 20th century.

== See also ==
- German Historical Institutes
- Germany–United States relations
