= Margaret Walton-Roberts =

Canadian geographer (1968–2025)

Margaret Walton-Roberts (March 13, 1968 – August 11, 2025) was a Canadian human geographer and university professor who focused on international migration, especially of workers in the health sector and earned her doctorate in Canada after moving there. She was instrumental in the creation of the International Migration Research Centre, housed at the Balsillie School of International Affairs in Waterloo, Canada.

== Life and career ==
Walton-Roberts was raised in Essex, England and enrolled at the University of Manchester, graduating with a degree in geography. She moved to Canada to conduct her graduate work at the University of British Columbia in Vancouver, where she earned her master’s and PhD. Beginning in 2002, she taught at Wilfrid Laurier University in Ontario as well as the Balsillie School of International Affairs, in Waterloo, Canada.

She became an immigration policy researcher, especially as it applied to people moving to Canada from elsewhere. Specifically, she studied the experiences of international students, refugees and skilled workers. With regard to healthcare workers with international training, her research focused on the migration of nurses and the resulting restructuring of labor patterns in the country's health care organizations.

Using her already established research collaborations with colleagues in India, especially Punjab and Kerala, she went on to explore similar South Asian communities in Canada. She investigated the negotiations of gender roles, religious identities and citizenship among individuals in that group. Her transnational perspective helped her to "illuminate the processes that drive out-migration, its micro-scale impacts, and the broader political economy of development in migrant-sending states." She also expanded her work by including "a critical feminist perspective, foregrounded the lived experiences of migrants, and sought to influence policies towards a more just and humane treatment of migrants."

Walton‐Roberts died from cancer on August 11, 2025, at the age of 57. Her three sons and partner, Ben, survived her.

== Selected publications ==
- Walton‐Roberts, Margaret. "Transnational geographies: Indian immigration to Canada." Canadian Geographer/Le Géographe canadien 47, no. 3 (2003): 235–250.
- Walton‐Roberts, Margaret. "Contextualizing the global nursing care chain: international migration and the status of nursing in Kerala, India." Global Networks 12, no. 2 (2012): 175–194.
- Walton-Roberts, Margaret. "International migration of health professionals and the marketization and privatization of health education in India: From push–pull to global political economy." Social Science & Medicine 124 (2015): 374–382.
- Connell, John; Walton-Roberts, Margaret. "What about the workers? The missing geographies of health care." Progress in Human Geography 40, no. 2 (2016): 158–176.
