= Heimkehrerdenkmal =

Monument in Friedland, Germany

Coordinates: 51°24′56.781735″N 9°54′31.521664″E

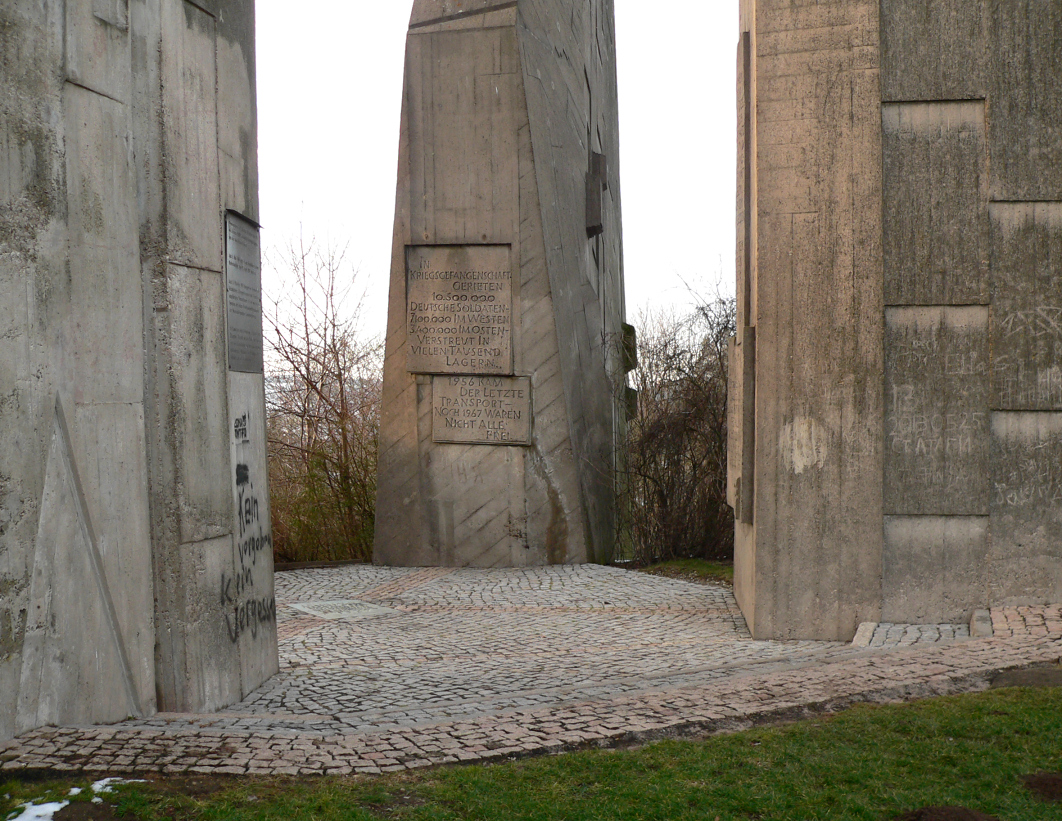

The Heimkehrerdenkmal (also referred to as the Heimkehrermahnmal) is a monument in Friedland, Germany, dedicated to German prisoners of war during the Second World War. Both Heimkehrerdenkmal and Heimkehrermahnmal translate to Monument to Homecomers in English. It is significant as one of the only monuments in Germany dedicated to Germans who served as soldiers in the war. The monument was commissioned by the Verband der Heimkehrer, Kriegsgefangenen und Vermisstenangehörigen Deutschlands (Association of Returnees, Prisoners of War and Relatives of the Missing - VdH), which was founded in 1950 to represent the interests of German former soldiers. The VdH commissioned around 1800 monuments dedicated to German POWs, of which only a few remain. When the monument was inaugurated in 1967, representatives of the German federal government declined to attend because of the monument's controversial focus on German victimhood. The monument has been subject to vandalism, including graffiti referring to German concentration camps.

== Design ==
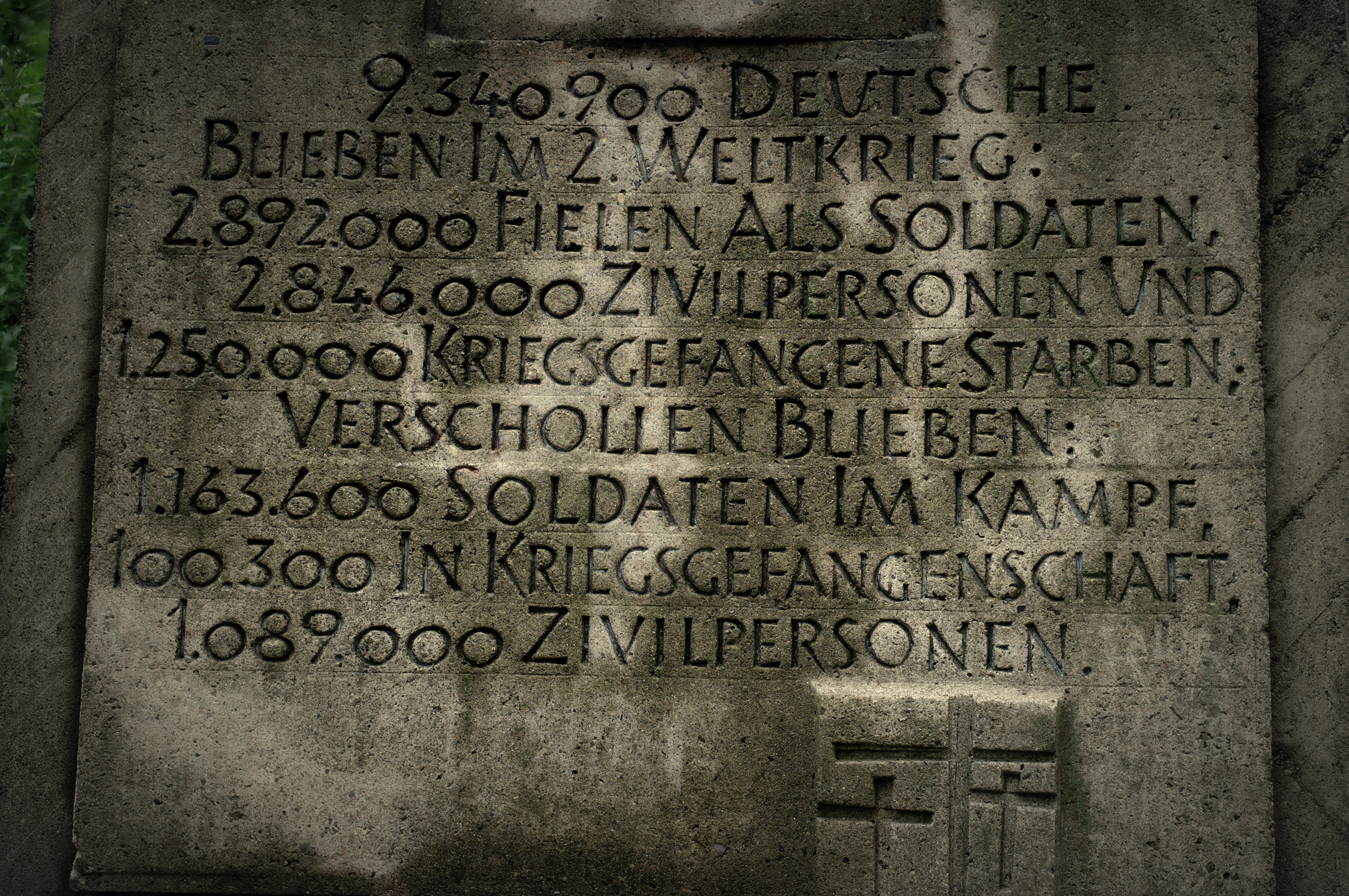
Inscription at Heimkehrerdenkmal.

The Heimkehrerdenkmal consists of four concrete panels representing the suffering of Wehrmacht soldiers. At 28-meters high, the Heimkehrerdenkmal is visible from the nearby highway. The monument sits atop a small hill, surrounded by grass and trees just outside of Friedland, Germany. While the monument does not heroize the German soldiers of World War II, it does conflate the suffering of the soldiers with the German civilians who lost their lives to the war. The monument also makes no mention of the suffering caused by the Wehrmacht soldiers and the Nazi regime.

The Heimkehrerdenkmal is one of the few examples of a German memorial to its soldiers who fought in the Second World War, and it is largely unknown by Germans today. The inscription on the monument lists the number of German soldiers (2,892,000), civilians (2,846,000), and prisoners of war (1,250,000) who died during the Second World War. The next sentence of the inscription lists the numbers of missing people: 1,163,600 German soldiers in combat, 100,300 prisoners of war, and 1,089,000 civilians.

The monument was the first of its kind in Germany. German military historian Jörg Echternkamp wrote "Monuments from the 1950s, usually conceived of in a figurative formal language and featuring local references, recalled the consequences of the war such as imprisonment, flight, and expulsion; the resistance of 17 June 1953; or German partition. After 1967, however, a central monument dedicated to the war and its effects came into existence for the first time."

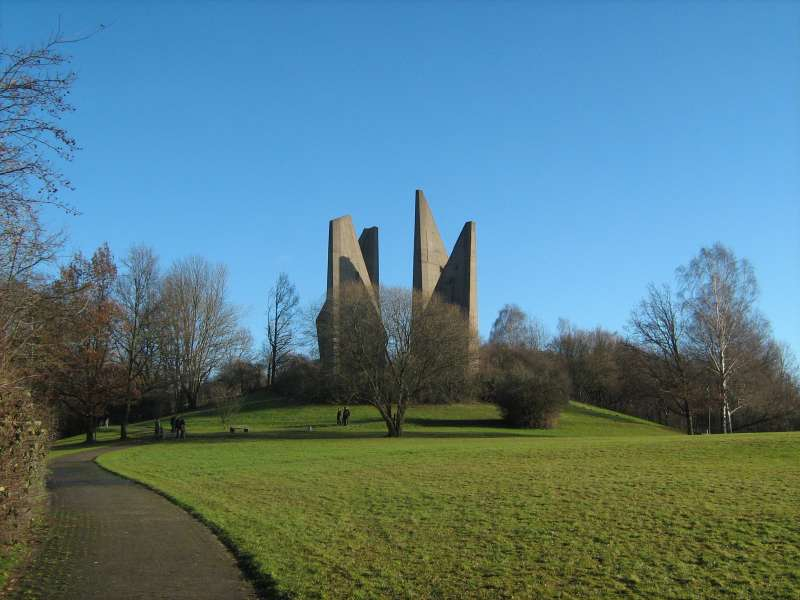
Heimkehrerdenkmal in Friedland, Germany

== Construction ==
In 1957, Chancellor Konrad Adenauer had initiated plans for the memorial as an official site honoring the memory of Germany. Construction on the Heimkehrerdenkmal began in 1966 and finished in 1967. The monument was constructed in Friedland near the Friedland Transit Camp, where the final group of returnees from the war were processed. The memorial was commissioned by the VdH with support from children of former POWs.

== Association of Returnees, Prisoners of War and Relatives of the Missing (VdH) ==
Verband der Heimkehrer, Kriegsgefangenen und Vermisstenangehörigen Deutschlands translates to the Association of Returnees, Prisoners of War and Relatives of the Missing (VdH). The VdH had the primary goal of "working more effectively than before for the interests of homecomers." By 1961 the VdH had 160,000 members advocating for German prisoners of war and veterans. The VdH spread its messages and posted missing soldier ads through the newspaper Der Heimkehrer: Stimme der Kriegsgeneration (roughly "The Homecomer: Voice of the War Generation"). The VdH requested compensation for soldiers whose return had been delayed by the Soviet Union, and successfully advocated for the release of prisoners of war who remained in the Soviet Union. Because of the VdH, Chancellor Adenauer traveled to Moscow in 1955 to negotiate the release of and bring home 10,000 German prisoners of war. The association also collaborated with other German organizations such as the German Red Cross to bring home German soldiers.

== Controversy ==
The Heimkehrerdenkmal has generated controversy for failing to address Germany's culpability in causing the suffering of its own citizens and the deaths of fifty million people worldwide during the Second World War. The ethnographer Peter van der Veer describes hearing such criticisms from visitors at the monument, and he observes "this is a view one encounters more often in conversations with people from the former DDR, that in the DDR they at least had the moral decency to understand these facts in terms of German guilt instead of in terms of victimhood."
