= Ethnic groups in the United Kingdom =

The United Kingdom is an ethnically diverse society. The largest ethnic group in the United Kingdom is White British, followed by Asian British. Ethnicity in the United Kingdom is formally recorded at the national level through a census. The 2021 United Kingdom census recorded a reduced share of White British people in the United Kingdom from the previous 2011 United Kingdom census. Factors that are contributing to the growth of minority populations are varied in nature, including differing birth rates and Immigration.

According to the Office for National Statistics (ONS) based on population census figures from 2021, people from ethnic minority backgrounds make up 17% of the United Kingdom (19% for England, 6.2% for Wales, 12.9% for Scotland and 4.4% for Northern Ireland).

In England and Wales, the second largest high-level category in the 2021 census was "Asian, Asian British or Asian Welsh" (9.3%), followed by "Black, Black British, Black Welsh, Caribbean or African" (4.0%) and "Mixed or Multiple ethnic groups" (2.9%). In Scotland, the 2022 census used a different set of categories, including "Asian, Scottish Asian or British Asian", "African, Scottish African or British African" and "Mixed or multiple ethnic groups".

The categories used to record ethnicity are not fixed: the Government Statistical Service (GSS) has consulted on adding new response options to the harmonised ethnicity standard, which is intended to inform the design of the 2031 census. The category "Other ethnic group" in the 2021 census includes "Arab" and "Any other ethnic group", the latter allowing respondents to write in their own answer.

== History ==
A variety of ethnic groups have settled on the British Isles, dating back from the last ice age up until the 11th century. These populations included the Celtic Britons (including the Picts), Romans, Anglo-Saxons, Gaelic Scots, Norse, Danes and the Normans. Recent genetic studies have suggested that the prehistoric Bell Beaker influx and the Anglo-Saxon migrations had particularly significant effects on the genetic makeup of modern Britons.

William the Conqueror introduced the first Jewish settlers in England in 1070, and later on, in the 16th century, the first Romani were introduced in Britain. The UK has a history of small-scale non-European immigration, with Liverpool having the oldest Black British community dating back to at least the 1730s, during the period of the African slave trade. The oldest Chinese community in Europe, dates back to the arrival of Chinese seamen in the 19th century. In the 19th century, there was an increase of Jewish and Irish people living in Great Britain, with many settling in Glasgow, Liverpool, Manchester, Birmingham and in the East End of London, where these ethnic dialects contributed to the formation of the Cockney dialect.

Ethnic population composition changes from 1991 to 2021 according to the census in the United Kingdom

Since 1948 (and particularly from the mid-1950s), immigration from the West Indies and the Indian subcontinent occurred in substantial numbers due to labour shortages in Britain after World War II. Immigration started to increase in the 1950s and 1960s and the large influx of different cultures created different ethnic communities. However, instances of documented and perceived racism, and heavy-handed policing by the native English population, has led to a number of riots, most notably in 1958, 1981, 1985 and 2011. When Britain joined the EEC in 1973, the level of migration from Western European nations increased and migration from newer EU member states in Central, and Eastern Europe, have resulted in a large Eastern European population over the past two decades. However, after the Brexit Referendum in 2016, numbers began to decline once again.

Sociologist Steven Vertovec presents the idea of superdiversity in Britain; this is a notion that states that the increasing population of ethnic groups and communities are creating new, and smaller, ethnic minorities in Britain. The dynamics of superdiversity influence the social and economic patterns of the United Kingdom and have created complex social frameworks.

== Official classification of ethnicity ==
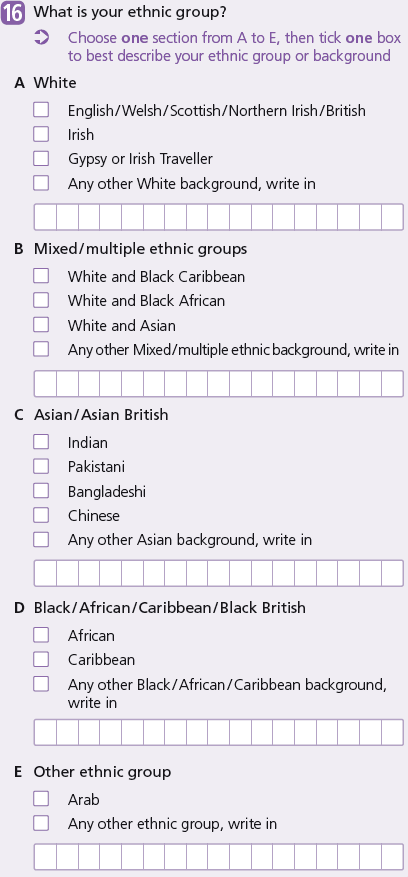
The ethnic group question used in the 2011 census in England. In Wales, "Welsh" and "English" were listed in the opposite order. The options in Scotland and Northern Ireland were slightly different from those in England and Wales.

The definition of ethnicity has been defined as "the social group a person belongs to, and either identifies with or is identified with by others, as a result of a mix of cultural and other factors including language, diet, religion, ancestry and physical features traditionally associated with race".

The 1991 UK census was the first to include a question on ethnicity, before which the census asked country of birth. The 2001 UK Census classified ethnicity into several groups: White, Black, Asian, Mixed, Chinese and Other. These categories formed the basis for all National Ethnicity statistics until the 2011 Census results were issued. A number of academics have pointed out that since 1991, the ethnicity classification employed in the census, alongside other official statistics in the UK have high levels of confusion regarding the concepts of ethnicity and race. David I. Kertzer and Dominique Arel argue that this is the case in many censuses, and the definition of ethnicity should first be illuminated. User consultation undertaken for the purpose of planning the 2011 census revealed that some participants thought the "use of colour (White and Black) to define ethnicity is confusing or unacceptable".

== Population by ethnicity ==
Map showing the percentage of the population who are not white according to the 2011 census.

The population of the United Kingdom and its constituent countries are ethnically diverse today. From the beginning of modern migration to the country, the White population has been in proportional decline; however, the question of ethnicity was only first asked in the 1991 census.

Ethnic Group	Year							
Ethnic Group	1991 (Note: For 1991, Only data from Great Britain itself has been used, due to Northern Ireland not conducting an question on ethnicity within the jurisdiction.)		2001		2011		2021 (Note: Whereas the censuses of England and Wales and of Northern Ireland went ahead as planned in 2021, the census in Scotland was postponed until 2022. The Office for National Statistics reports that these UK-wide statistics "have been created to provide an image of how UK census data may have looked if the most recent UK censuses had been conducted with an aligned date of 21 March 2021".)	
Ethnic Group	Number	%	Number	%	Number	%	Number	%
White: Total	51,873,794	94.5%	54,153,898	92.12%	55,073,552	87.17%	55,577,873	83.1%
White: British	–	–	52,037,485	88.52%	51,736,290	81.88%		
White: Irish	–	–	691,232	1.18%	585,087	0.92%		
White: Gypsy / Traveller / Irish Traveller	–	–	1,710	–	63,193	0.1%		
White: Other	–	–	1,423,471	2.42%	2,690,088	4.25%		
Asian / Asian British: Total	1,834,117	3.34%	2,578,826	4.39%	4,373,339	6.3%	5,752,872	8.6%
Asian / Asian British: Indian	840,255	1.53%	1,053,411	1.79%	1,451,862	2.3%		
Asian / Asian British: Pakistani	476,555	0.86%	747,285	1.27%	1,174,983	1.9%		
Asian / Asian British: Bangladeshi	162,835	0.29%	283,063	0.48%	451,529	0.7%		
Asian / Asian British: Chinese (Note: In 2001, listed under the "Other ethnic group" heading.)	156,938	0.28%	247,403	0.42%	433,150	0.7%		
Asian / Asian British: Other Asian	197,534	0.35%	247,664	0.42%	861,815	1.4%		
Black / Black British: Total (Note: For the purpose of harmonising results to make them comparable across the UK, the ONS includes individuals in Scotland who classified themselves in the "African" category (29,638 people), which in the Scottish version of the census is separate from "Caribbean or Black" (6,540 people), in this "Black or Black British" category. The ONS note that "the African categories used in Scotland could potentially capture White/Asian/Other African in addition to Black identities".)	890,727	1.62%	1,148,738	1.95%	1,904,684	3.0%	2,482,902	3.7%
Black / Black British: African	212,362	0.38%	485,277	0.83%	1,020,973	1.61%		
Black / Black British: Caribbean	499,964	0.91%	565,876	0.96%	598,197	0.94%		
Black / Black British: Other Black	178,401	0.32%	97,585	0.17%	282,336	0.44%		
British Mixed	–	–	677,117	1.15%	1,250,229	2.0%	1,789,368	2.7%
Other: Total	290,206	0.52%	230,615	0.39%	580,374	0.9%	1,309,614	2.0%
Total:	54,888,844	100%	58,789,194	100%	63,182,178	100%	66,912,629	100%

== National minorities ==
The British government recognises the Scottish, Welsh, Irish and Cornish peoples as national minorities under the Council of Europe's Framework Convention for the Protection of National Minorities, which the UK signed in 1995 and ratified in 1998.

== Multiculturalism and integration ==
It is estimated that in 1950 there were no more than 20,000 non-white residents in the United Kingdom, almost all having been born outside the UK and now mainly residing in England.

However, the considerable migration after World War II increased the ethnic and racial diversity of UK, especially in London. The race relations policies that have been developed broadly reflect the principles of multiculturalism, although there is no official national commitment to multiculturalism.

The national identity of 'being British' is to respect the laws and parliamentary structures, as well as all maintaining the right to equality; however, this does not cover the concept of multiculturalism. This concept of 'being British' faces criticism on the grounds that it has failed to sufficiently promote social integration. Some commentators have questioned the dichotomy between diversity and integration. and since 2001 it has been argued that the UK government has moved away from policy characterised by multiculturalism, and towards the assimilation of minority communities.

In 2016, the British government held a European Union membership referendum. The result of the referendum showed that 51.9% of British voters wanted to leave the EU. On 31 January 2020, the deal was reached for the United Kingdom of Great Britain and Northern Ireland to leave the EU on 1 January 2021, also known as Brexit, with terms being agreed to on 24 December 2020. Some have said that Brexit limits multiculturalism and encourages exclusive nationalism and nativism; however, some feel that Brexit supports traditional British identity.

=== Attitudes to multiculturalism ===
Mark Drakeford, First Minister at the Welsh Government in November 2020 wishes a Happy Diwali to all those celebrating in Wales and the rest of the world.

A poll conducted by MORI for the BBC in 2005 found that 62 per cent of respondents agreed that multiculturalism made the UK a better place to live, compared to 32 percent who saw it as a threat. In contrast, Ipsos MORI data from 2008 showed that only 30 per cent saw multiculturalism as making the UK a better place to live, with 38 per cent seeing it as a threat. 41 per cent of respondents to the 2008 poll favoured the development of a shared identity over the celebration of diverse values and cultures, with 27 per cent favouring the latter and 30 per cent undecided.

A study conducted for the Commission for Racial Equality (CRE) in 2005, found that in England, the majority of ethnic minority participants called themselves British, whereas white English participants said English first and British second. In Wales and Scotland the majority of white and ethnic minority participants identified with Welsh or Scottish first and British second. Research suggests that on average ethnic minorities are twice as likely to say their ethnicity is important to them than white British participants, although the extent of this difference also interacted with political beliefs.

Other research conducted for the CRE found that white participants felt that there was a threat to Britishness from large-scale immigration, claiming that they perceived ethnic minorities made a rise in moral pluralism and political correctness. Much of this frustration was directed at Muslims rather than minorities in general. Muslim participants in the study reported feeling victimised and stated that they felt the pressure of choosing between Muslim and British identities, whereas they saw it possible to be both.

== Political representation ==
Ethnic minorities have been under-represented in comparison with their white counterparts in the United Kingdom's political system, particularly in the British Parliament. In 1981, the Home Affairs Select Committee report stated that an "increase in ethnic minority involvement in politics will create ... special representation for ethnic minorities". However, in 2017 Theresa May stated that ethnic minorities were still under-represented. In 2019, 65 Members of Parliament (MPs) or 10% of all MPs were from an ethnic minority background.

=== Representation in Parliament ===
Representation of ethnic minorities in Parliament began in 1987, seeing four ethnic minorities being elected into parliament. Among them was Diane Abbott, Britain's first black female Member of Parliament, who began as a member of the shadow cabinet and was a prominent figure within the Labour Party.

Prior to the 2010 elections, the Conservatives had 2 MPs who were minorities; this increased to 11 after the 2010 General Election. After the 2017 General Elections, 52 minority MPs were elected, shared between Labour (32) and the Conservative (19) and one from the Liberal Democrats. The 2019 general elections showed an increase in these numbers with Labour having 41, the Conservatives having 22 and the Liberal Democrats having 2 ethnic-minority MPs.

=== Representation in Local Councils ===
In 2018, 3.7% of all local government officials had an ethnic minority background. London councils had the highest percentage for representation in their local councils in late 2017, 10.5%; this increased from 5.6% previously in the year. Outside London, councils have an average of 3% minority representation. In Scotland, 3.2% of local government officials are ethnic minorities, almost proportionately representing the 3.32% ethnic minority.

Since the 1980s, the number of minority councillors has been increasing over time, however, the main parties of minorities involved were the Labour party, with 94.4% of minority councillors affiliated with the Labour Party.

There were 35 minority councillors in London local councils in 1978 and this had increased to 193 by 1990. This was 10% of the 1,915 councillors representing 20% of London's population. According to a Census of Local Authority Councillors in 2013, there was 3.7% representation for minorities across all councils, compared to a representation of 13% nationally. Labour continues to have the largest proportion of ethnic minority councillors with 9.2%, followed by the Conservatives with 1.5%.

== Voting by Ethnic group ==
=== 2024 ===
Breakdown of vote in Great Britain into affiliates (%) by demographic
Category	Lab.	Con.	Ref.	LD	Grn	SNP/PC	Others	Margin
All	35	24	15	13	7	4	3	11
Ethnic group
White	33	26	16	13	6	4	2	7
All ethnic minorities	46	17	3	8	11	1	13	29
Asian	39	18	3	8	11	1	20	19
Black	68	16	1	6	8	1	1	52
Mixed	50	14	7	11	13	3	2	36

=== 2019 ===
The 2019 UK general election vote in Great Britain
Social group	% Con	% Lab	% Lib Dem	% Others	% Lead
Total vote	45	33	12	10	12
Ethnic group
White	48	29	12	11	19
BME	20	64	12	4	44

=== 2017 ===
The 2017 UK general election vote in Great Britain
Social group	Con	Lab	Lib Dem	UKIP	Others	Lead
Total vote	44	41	8	2	5	3
Ethnic group
White	45	39	8	2	6	6
BME	19	73	6	0	2	54

=== 2015 ===
The 2015 UK General Election vote in Great Britain
Social group	Con	Lab	UKIP	Lib Dem	Green	Others	Lead
Total vote	38	31	13	8	4	6	7
Ethnic group
White	39	28	14	8	4	7	11
BME	23	65	2	4	3	3	44

=== 2010 ===
The 2010 UK general election vote in Great Britain
Social group	Con	Lab	Lib Dem	Others	Lead
Total vote	37	30	24	19	7
Ethnic group
White	38	28	24	8	11
BAME	16	60	20	4	40

== See also ==
- Ethnic groups in London
- British people
- Demographics of the United Kingdom
- Foreign-born population of the United Kingdom
- Genetic history of the British Isles
- Historical immigration to Great Britain
- Modern immigration to the United Kingdom
- Languages of the United Kingdom
- List of electoral firsts in the United Kingdom
- Romanichal
