= Miriam Rürup =

German historian (born 1973)

Miriam Rürup (born 1973 in Karlsruhe, Germany) is a German historian and director of the Moses Mendelssohn Zentrum in Potsdam (Germany).

== Academic career ==
Miriam Rürup studied history, sociology and cultural anthropology at the universities of Göttingen (Germany), Tel Aviv (Israel) and Berlin (Germany). She worked as a research assistant at the "Topography of Terror" Foundation in Berlin, and as a doctoral fellow at the Franz Rosenzweig Minerva Research Center at the Hebrew University of Jerusalem, and the Simon Dubnow Institute in Leipzig (Germany).

In 2006, she received her doctorate from the Centre for Anti-Semitism Research (Zentrum für Antisemitismusforschung / ZfA) at the Technische Universität Berlin. Her book on the history of German-Jewish student fraternities in Imperial and Weimar Germany was published in 2007. Between 2006 and 2010 she was a postdoctoral fellow/assistant professor at the DFG-Graduiertenkolleg "Generationengeschichte" as well as at the history department of the University of Göttingen. Afterwards, she worked for two years as a research fellow at the German Historical Institute in Washington, DC. In July 2012 Rürup became the director of the IGdJ in Hamburg, where she also taught at the history department of the Hamburg University. In December 2020, she became the director of the MMZ in Potsdam.

Her research focuses on German-Jewish history, contemporary history (especially the history of Nazi Germany and the aftermath), as well as the history of migration and gender. Her ongoing research project deals with a history of statelessness in Europe after both World Wars.

Miriam Rürup serves a member on the advisory boards of several scientific journals, e.g. WerkstattGeschichte (since 2002), Aschkenas (since 2013), and the Leo Baeck Institute Year Book (since 2014). Furthermore, she heads the editorial board of the digital bilingual (German/English) online edition of sources: "Key Documents of German-Jewish History" and she is one of the review editors for Jewish History with the online forum H-Soz-Kult.

She is also a member of the International Advisory Board Bergen-Belsen, of the Study Group Human Rights in the 20th Century by the Fritz Thyssen Foundation (Cologne), and the Wissenschaftlichen Arbeitsgemeinschaft of the Leo-Baeck-Institut in Germany.

== Selected works ==
- Social History of German Jews. A Short Introduction. Berghahn Books, New York 2024, ISBN 978-1-80539-453-2.
- (Ed. with Simone Lässig): Space and Spatiality in Modern German-Jewish History (New German Historical Perspectives; 8). New York: Berghahn, 2017, ISBN 978-1-78533-553-2.
- Alltag und Gesellschaft (Perspektiven deutsch-jüdischer Geschichte, hg. von der Wissenschaftlichen Arbeitsgemeinschaft des Leo-Baeck-Instituts). Paderborn: Schöningh, 2017, ISBN 978-3-506-77175-9.
- (Ed. with Uffa Jensen, Habbo Knoch, Daniel Morat): Gewalt und Gesellschaft. Klassiker modernen Denkens neu gelesen. Göttingen: Wallstein, 2011, ISBN 978-3-8353-0901-2 (review in German).
- (Ed.): Praktiken der Differenz. Diasporakulturen in der Zeitgeschichte. Göttingen: Wallstein, 2009, ISBN 978-3-8353-0509-0 (review in German).
- Ehrensache. Jüdische Studentenverbindungen an deutschen Universitäten, 1886–1937. Göttingen: Wallstein, 2008, ISBN 978-3-8353-0311-9 (download via the IGdJ website) (review in German) (review in German).
- (Ed. with Sabine Moller, Christel Trouvé): Abgeschlossene Kapitel? Zur Geschichte der Konzentrationslager und der NS-Prozesse. Tübingen: edition diskord, 2002, ISBN 978-3-8929-5726-3.
