= Simone Lässig =

German social and cultural historian (born 1964)

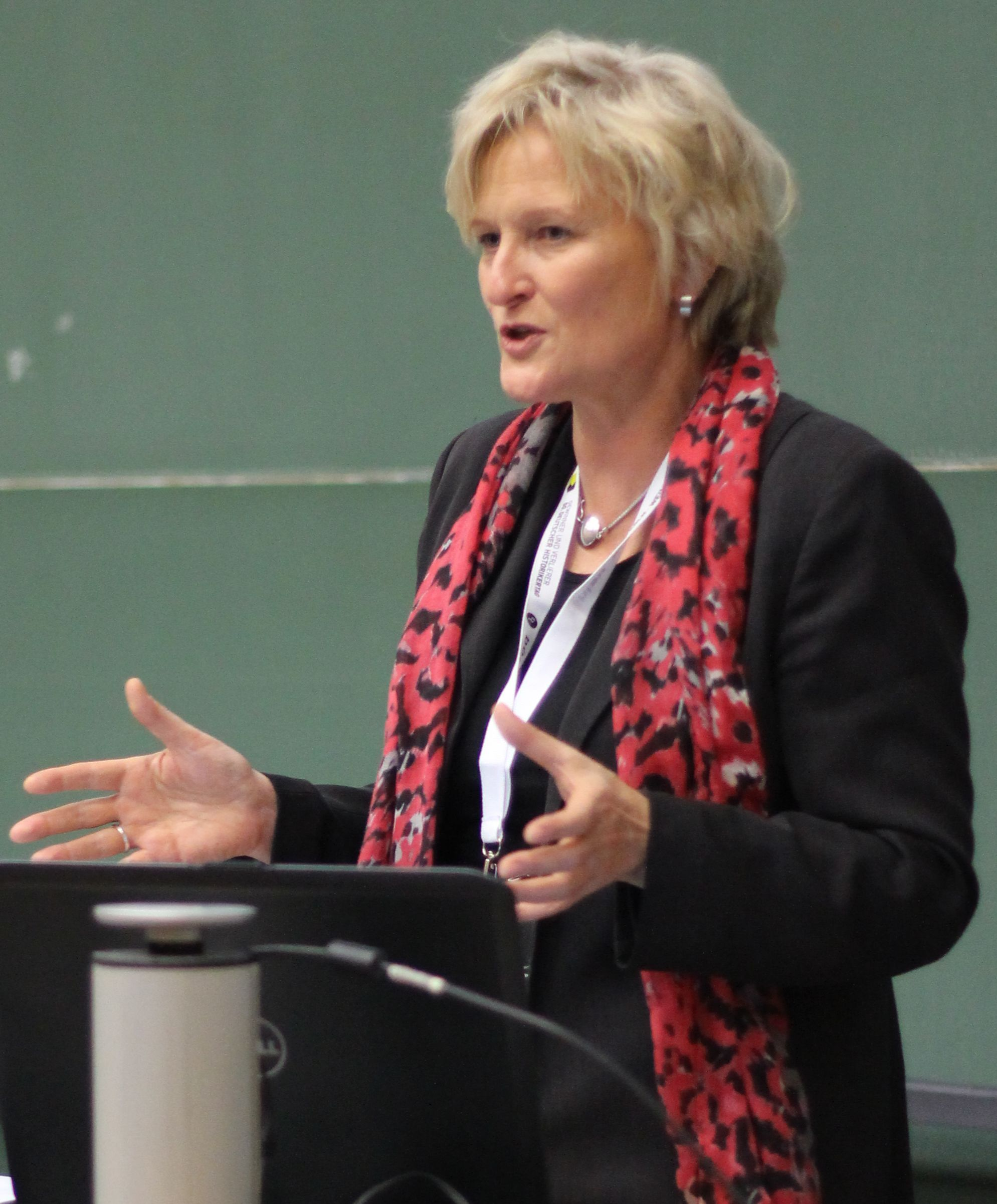
- Simone Lässig at the Historikertag 2014 in Göttingen
- Born: 1964 (age 61–62)
- Occupations: Cultural and social historian

Simone Lässig (born 1964) is a cultural and social historian of the nineteenth and twentieth centuries. From 2015 until 2025, she was the director of the German Historical Institute Washington DC.

== Early life and education ==
Simone Lässig was born in 1964. She graduated from the Extended Secondary School Altenburg in 1982. She then studied until 1987 at the Pedagogical University of Dresden, where in 1990 she obtained her PhD for a thesis on "Military Political action of social democracy in Eastern Saxony".

== Career ==
Lässig worked as a research assistant at the Department of Saxon history of the Technical University of Dresden. She was a Habilitation Fellow of the Deutsche Forschungsgemeinschaft and 2002-2006 Research Fellow at the German Historical Institute Washington (DC). She completed in 2003 a study on the "gentrification of Jews in Germany". Her habilitation thesis, the "Jewish way into the middle class" was later published and she received the 2004 Habilitation prize of the German Historians Association.

Between 2006 and 2015 Simone Lässig was director of the Georg Eckert Institute for International Textbook Research and Professor of Modern History at the Technical University of Braunschweig. From October 2009 to June 2010 she was a visiting professor at St Antony's College of University of Oxford.

From 2015 until 2025 Simone Lässig was the director of the German Historical Institute in Washington. Her research interests include the social - and cultural history of the 19th and 20th centuries, particularly Jewish history, religion and religiosity, entrepreneurs history, European history and issues of history teaching. In October 2025, she returned to her position as Professor of Modern History at the Technical University of Braunschweig.

== Selected publications ==
Monographs

- Wahlrechtskampf und Wahlreformen in Sachsen (1895–1909). Böhlau, Weimar/Köln/Wien 1996, ISBN 3-412-11095-7.
- Jüdische Wege ins Bürgertum. Kulturelles Kapital und sozialer Aufstieg im 19. Jahrhundert. Vandenhoeck & Ruprecht, Göttingen 2004, ISBN 3-525-36840-2.
  - (Habilitationsschrift: Ursachen eines prekären Erfolges. Die Verbürgerlichung der Juden in Deutschland im Zeitalter der Emanzipation. TU Dresden 2003.

Edited collections

- with Karl Heinrich Pohl, James Retallack: Modernisierung und Region im wilhelminischen Deutschland. Wahlen, Wahlrecht und politische Kultur. Verlag für Regionalgeschichte, Bielefeld 1995, ISBN 3-895-34153-3.
- with Karl Heinrich Pohl: Sachsen im Kaiserreich. Politik, Wirtschaft und Gesellschaft im Umbruch. Böhlau, Weimar/Köln/Wien 1997, ISBN 3-412-04396-6.
- with Karl Heinrich Pohl: Projekte im Fach Geschichte. Historisches Forschen und Entdecken in Schule und Hochschule. Wochenschau, Schwalbach/Ts., ISBN 3-899-74323-7.
- with Miriam Rürup: Space and Spatiality in Modern German-Jewish History (New German Historical Perspectives; 8). Berghahn, New York 2017, ISBN 978-1-78533-553-2.
