= Gerald D. Feldman =

American historian (1937–2007)

Gerald Donald Feldman (April 24, 1937 – October 31, 2007) was an American historian who specialized in 20th-century German history. He was professor of history at the University of California, Berkeley, and received several prizes and honors, including the Order of Merit of the Federal Republic of Germany.

== Biography ==
Feldman was born on April 24, 1937, in New York City, the son of Isadore Feldman and Lillian (Cohen) Feldman. He grew up in the Bronx in a Jewish family of modest financial means. He studied at Columbia University, graduating magna cum laude, then went to Harvard University for graduate study. He was awarded a Ph.D. in 1964. In 1963 he started as assistant professor at the University of California, Berkeley. In 1966 he published his dissertation, entitled Army, Industry, and Labor in Germany, 1914–18, a study of the militarization of German society through the collaborative interaction of the country's heavy industry with its socialist labor movement during World War I. In 1977 he published Iron and Steel in the German Inflation, 1916–23 which focused on the history of Germany's heavy industry in the Weimar Republic. His The Great Disorder. Politics, Economics, and Society in the German Inflation, 1914–24 (1993) focused on the inflation from the war economy to the post war hyperinflation. The Journal of Military History described it as "essential reading for anyone who truly wishes to understand what happened to Germany in the first third of the 20th century."

In his last years he focused on business history by reappraising the role of German corporations during the National Socialist regime. He wrote Deutsche Bank (1995), Allianz (2001), and the Österreichische Banken und Sparkassen (2006). He additionally served as an advisor to the Presidential Commission on Holocaust Assets in the United States and to researchers who later published on topics related to German banking and forced labor in the mining industry. He participated in a 2001 symposium on Nazi confiscation of Jewish property, where he was acknowledged as "one of the pioneers" in the investigation of the symposium's topic.

At the University of California, Berkeley he fostered the growth of the Center for German and European Studies, which became the Institute of European Studies. He had a particular interest in promoting connections between academics in the U.S. and Europe, leading him to serve as an advisory board member and president of the "Friends" group for the German Historical Institute in Washington, DC, an organization that facilitates interactions between German and American historians. In 2004 he became a member of the Bavarian Academy of Sciences and Humanities. He was the recipient of a Guggenheim Fellowship and a Woodrow Wilson Fellowship and was a Berlin Prize Fellow in the Classes of Fall 1998 and Spring 1999. For more than fifteen years he was a member of the editorial board of the Contemporary European History. In 2000 he was awarded with the Order of Merit of the Federal Republic of Germany.

Feldman was married twice, to Philippa Blume, from whom he was divorced in 1982, and Norma von Ragenfeld-Feldman, who was living at the time of his death. His first marriage produced two children. He died of lymphoma on October 31, 2007.

== Books ==
Feldman was the author, co-author or editor of at least 27 books, including:

- Army, Industry and Labor in Germany, 1914–1918 (1966), reprint 1992, Berg Publishers, ISBN 978-0854967643
- Iron and Steel in the German Inflation, 1916–1923 (1977), Princeton University Press, ISBN 978-0691042152
- Industrie und Inflation. Studien und Dokumente zur Politik der deutschen Unternehmer 1916 bis 1923 (with Heidrun Homburg, 1977), reprint, Hoffmann und Campe Verlag GmbH, 1982, ISBN 978-3455092097
- Vom Weltkrieg zur Weltwirtschaftskrise. Studien zur deutschen Wirtschafts‑ und Sozialgeschichte 1914 – 1932 (1984), reprint 1997, Vandenhoeck + Ruprecht GmbH, ISBN 978-3525357194
- Industrie und Gewerkschaften 1918 – 1924. Die überforderte Zentralarbeitsgmeinschaft (with Irmgard Steinisch, 1985), Deutsche Verlags-Anstalt DVA, ISBN 978-3421062581
- The Great Disorder: Politics, Economics, and Society in the German Inflation, 1914–1924 (1993), reprint 1997, Oxford University Press, ISBN 978-0195101140
  - DAAD Book Award, 1995
- A History of the Deutsche Bank, 1870–1995 (Lothar Gall, Gerald D. Feldman, Harold James, Carl-Ludwig Holtfrerich, Hans E. Büschgen, 1995), C.H. Beck, ISBN 978-3406389450
  - Financial Times/Booz Allen Hamilton Business Book Award, 1995
- Hugo Stinnes. Biographie eines Industriellen 1870–1924 (1998), C.H. Beck, ISBN 978-3406435829
- Die Allianz und die Deutsche Versicherungswirtschaft 1933–1945 (2001), C.H. Beck, ISBN 978-3406482557
- Allianz and the German Insurance Business, 1933–1945 (2001), Cambridge University Press, ISBN 978-0521809290
