= Jan Blommaert =

Belgian academic (1961–2021)

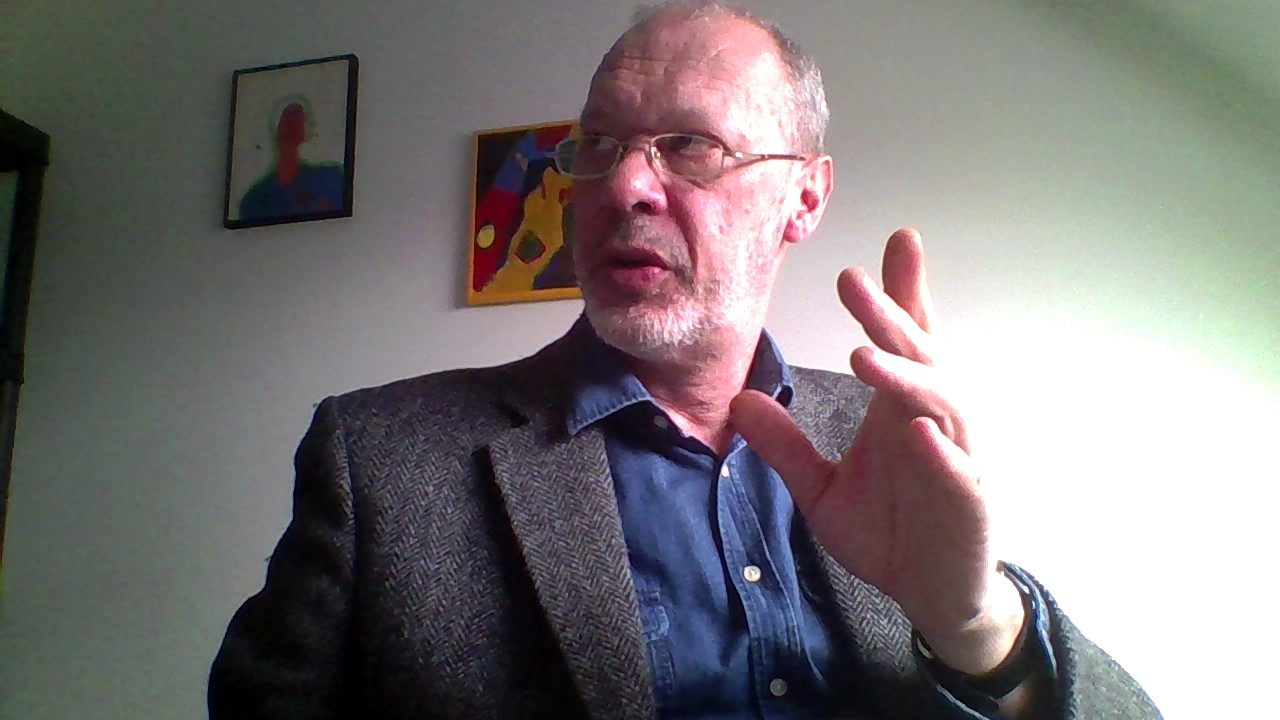
- Born: November 4, 1961; Dendermonde, Belgium
- Died: January 7, 2021 (aged 59)
- Citizenship: Belgian
- Education: Ghent University, University of Antwerp
- Scientific career
- Fields: Sociolinguistics, linguistic anthropology, discourse analysis, linguistics
- Workplaces: Tilburg University
- Website: http://www.tilburguniversity.edu/webwijs/show/?uid=j.blommaert

Jan Blommaert (4 November 1961 – 7 January 2021) was a Belgian sociolinguist and linguistic anthropologist, Professor of Language, Culture and Globalization and Director of the Babylon Center at Tilburg University, the Netherlands. He also held appointments at Ghent University (Belgium) and University of the Western Cape (South Africa). He was considered to be one of the world's most prominent sociolinguists and linguistic anthropologists, who had contributed substantially to sociolinguistic globalization theory that focuses on historical as well as contemporary patterns of the spread of languages and forms of literacy, and on lasting and new forms of inequality emerging from globalization processes.

== Biography ==
Born in Dendermonde, Belgium, Blommaert received his PhD in African History and Philology from Ghent University in 1989. After graduation Blommaert started as research director at the International Pragmatics Association hosted at the University of Antwerp. In 1999 back at the Ghent University he became Associate Professor and head of the Department of African Languages and Cultures. In 2005 he was appointed Professor and Chair at the Institute of Education, the University of London. In 2008 he moved to Finland, where he was appointed Finland Distinguished Professor at the Department of Languages of the University of Jyväskylä, which he held until 2010. In 2007 he was appointed Professor of Language, Culture and Globalization and Director of the Babylon Center at Tilburg University. He was also Professor at Ghent University.

He held honorary professorships at Beijing Language and Culture University, the University of the Western Cape and Hellenic American University. In January 2021, Blommaert died in Antwerp at the age of 59.

== Work ==
Blommaert's work focused on analysing issues of power and social inequality in language and society under conditions of contemporary globalization, from a discourse analytical and ethnographic perspective. His main focus was the ethnographic study of inequality in society, and particularly how it relates to language usage.

Apart from a voluminous academic body of work, Blommaert wrote extensively in Dutch, empirically addressing broader social and political issues in Belgian and Dutch society: nationalism, populism and democracy, asylum politics, issues in language and education, and essays on the sociology of work under neoliberalism. Blommaert's oeuvre in Dutch contributed to the debate on the status of the left on the political spectrum.

=== Language and society ===
Blommaert argued that under globalized conditions, our basic understanding of language and society needs to be redefined, and the discipline of sociolinguistics to move in more materialist, semiotic, and ethnographic directions: all signs, whether written texts, shop inscriptions, internet memes, or bureaucratic interviews, are produced from and circulating within particular "orders of indexicality". Blommaert emphasized the unequal access to universally valuable linguistic resources such as standard English or Dutch, and the social and political injustices as a result. Illustrations of this are given in his 2008 book, Grassroots Literacy, on marginal writing practices in Central Africa.

=== Sociolinguistics of globalization ===
From 2002, Blommaert moved towards a sociolinguistics of globalization, which was basically a new platform for thinking about language in society bearing in mind the fact that "old sociolinguistics" and its terminology could no longer address and do justice to new and unstable sociolinguistic realities, resulting from superdiversity.

Blommaert, drawing on Vertovec, described this superdiversity in terms of an increased mobility and an explosion of new technologies so that consequently, the idea of stability in social, cultural and linguistic formations can no longer be presupposed because of the disappearance of predictability. This superdiversity leads to issues of complexity, and Blommaert addressed these issues in Chronicles of Complexity, in which he argues that seemingly 'chaotic' sociolinguistics environments, turn out to have a particular (but changing) order.

=== Ethnography ===
The key to Blommaert's work is ethnography, including issues on methodology and empirical practice. Ethnography is however not reduced to those elements, but rather sketched as a paradigm, a robust theoretical and methodological framework through which the world is observed. To achieve such a wide view, Blommaert argued for a historical and "patterned" understanding of real language usage in society.

To develop the historical component, he frequently drew on Pierre Bourdieu, arguing that his eclectic methodological approach (ranging from observations to long-term surveys etc.) was essentially ethnographic; on Fernand Braudel, rethinking his concept of longue duree for considering sociolinguistic complexity, and Immanuel Wallerstein's views on the compression of time and space in World Systems Analysis. For the "patterned" component, Blommaert largely drew on Dell Hymes' concept of ethnopoetics, a methodological instrument to analyze narratives in patterned ways.

Like Hymes, Blommaert recognized unfamiliar patterns to have a relevant and particular structure to the speaker, but found that they are mis-recognized in, for example, bureaucratic encounters, in situations where "systems of meaning-making meet". But whereas Hymes largely focused on print data and the reanalysis of others' data, Blommaert refined the methodology by using first-hand, real-life data from Belgian asylum seekers and subsequently developed an applied ethnopoetics.

Blommaert is primarily responsible for the introduction of ethnography into Linguistic_landscape analysis through his Ethnographic Linguistic Landscape Analysis or ELLA (2013), a qualitative method of linguistic landscape analysis that argues that signs must be seen as traces of multimodal communicative practices within a sociopolitically and historically structured field.

== Publications ==
- 1998. Debating Diversity: Analyzing the Discourse of Tolerance (with Jef Verschueren). London: Routledge.
- 1999. Language Ideological Debates. Berlin: Mouton De Gruyter.
- 1999. State Ideology and Language in Tanzania. Köln: Rüdiger Köppe Verlag.
- 2005. Discourse: A Critical Introduction. Cambridge: Cambridge University Press.
- 2008. Grassroots Literacy: Writing, Identity and Voice in Central Africa. London: Routledge.
- 2010. The Sociolinguistics of Globalization. Cambridge: Cambridge University Press.
- 2010. Ethnographic Fieldwork: An Introduction (with Dong Jie). Bristol: Multilingual Matters.
- 2013. Ethnography, Superdiversity and Linguistic Landscapes: Chronicles of Complexity. Bristol: Multilingual Matters.
- 2018. Durkheim and the Internet: On Sociolinguistics and the Sociological Imagination. London: Bloomsbury.

== Awards and honours ==
- Ark Prize of the Free Word, 1993.
- Emile Verhaeren chair, Free University Brussels (VUB), Belgium, 2002-3.
- Finland Distinguished Professor, University of Jyväskylä, Finland, 2008-10.
- first Barbara Metzger Prize, Wenner-Gren Foundation and Current Anthropology, 2010.
