= Ethnopoetics =

Method of recording text versions of oral poetry

Ethnopoetics is a method of recording text versions of oral poetry or narrative performances (i.e. verbal lore) that uses poetic lines, verses, and stanzas (instead of prose paragraphs) to capture the formal, poetic performance elements which would otherwise be lost in the written texts. The goal of any ethnopoetic text is to show how the techniques of unique oral performers enhance the aesthetic value of their performances within their specific cultural contexts. Major contributors to ethnopoetic theory include Jerome Rothenberg, Dennis Tedlock, and Dell Hymes. Ethnopoetics is considered a subfield of ethnology, anthropology, folkloristics, stylistics, linguistics, literature and translation studies.

== A need for ethnopoetics: Rothenberg ==
Jerome Rothenberg coined the term ethnopoetics in the 1960s. According to Catherine S. Quick, Rothenberg had recognized that “most translations of Native American oral traditions . . . failed to capture the power and beauty of the oral performances on the written page,” especially when “Western poetic styles” were imposed upon these written texts (1999, 96). Rothenberg’s influence has increased public awareness of the rich narrative and poetic traditions of cultures all over the world.

== Ethnopoetic theory: Tedlock and Hymes ==
The development of ethnopoetics as a separate subfield of study was largely pioneered from the middle of the 20th century by anthropologists and linguists such as Dennis Tedlock and Dell Hymes. Both Tedlock and Hymes used ethnopoetic analysis to do justice to the artistic richness of Native American verbal art, and while they have disagreed on some analytic details, they agree on the fundamental issues and purposes of ethnopoetics.

=== Dennis Tedlock ===
On the one hand, Dennis Tedlock argues not only that pauses in oral performances indicate where poetic line breaks should occur in the written texts, which he compares to musical scores, but also that words on the page should be formatted to reflect the more subtle qualities of speech used in oral performances. Tedlock explain his perspective in this way,

An ethnopoetic score [or text] not only takes account of the words but silences, changes in loudness and tone of voice, the production of sound effects, and the use of gestures and props. . . . Ethnopoetics remains open to the creative side of performance, valuing features that may be rare or even unique to a particular artist or occasion.

In other words, Tedlock argues that by visually representing oral performance features in the written texts, ethnopoetic methods more accurately convey the aesthetic qualities of the performance than uniformly formatted text in prose paragraphs ever could. Tedlock himself defines ethnopoetics as “a decentered poetics, an attempt to hear and read the poetries of distant others, outside the Western [poetic] tradition as we know it now."

=== Dell Hymes ===
On the other hand, Dell Hymes believes that even previously dictated texts retain significant structural patterns of poetic repetition that “are the ‘reason why’” storytellers use pauses in their oral performances (1999, 97–98). Hymes’s ethnopoetic theories focus on repetitions in the grammar and syntax of transcribed and translated texts that he suggest can still be analyzed and retranslated. For example, accordingly to folklorist Barre Toelken, the poetic beauty and power of Native American texts like “The Sun's Myth” have been restored “because a dedicated anthropological folklorist and linguist, Dell Hymes, dedicated a good part of his life to resuscitating a dry, written text collected . . . by a long-dead anthropologist [i.e., Franz Boas] and stored away in a dusty volume” (2003, 122). When Hymes retranslated “The Sun’s Myth,” he recovered the poetic and stylistic devices that were used in the original recorded performance, but which had been lost in the myth’s earlier translation by Franz Boas.

Hymes’ ethnopoetics revolves around a conception of narratives as primarily organized in terms of formal and aesthetic—‘poetic’—patterns, not in terms of content or thematic patterns. Narrative is therefore to be seen as a form of action, of performance, and the meanings it generates are effects of performance. Narratives, seen from this perspective, are organized in lines and in groups of lines (verses, stanzas), and the organization of lines in narratives is a kind of implicit patterning that creates narrative effect. . . . Content, in other words, is an effect of the formal organization of a narrative: What there is to be told emerges out of how it is being told. (Blommaert 2007, 216)

Also, understanding the native language of oral performers is essential for accurate, ethnopoetic translation of their words into written texts. For example, folklorist Barre Toelken explains that Hymes’s “knowledge of the extant Chinookan languages” helped him to “notice stylistic devices that highlighted certain actions and themes and even performance styles that brought scenes into sharp focus” (2003, 122). In other words, without his knowledge of the native language of oral performers, Hymes could not have placed his ethnopoetic translation of “The Sun’s Myth” within its specific Native American cultural context.

== Ethnopoetics: aesthetic movement or academic discipline? ==
Various other writers and poets can be said to have contributed to the field of ethnopoetics as an aesthetic movement. For example, Tristan Tzara created calligrams and William Bright worked with the Karuk tribe to preserve their native language. However, within the fields of linguistics, folkloristics, and anthropology, ethnopoetics refers to a particular method of analyzing the linguistic features and syntactical structures of oral literature (such as poetry, myths, narratives, folk tales, ceremonial speeches, etc.) in ways that pay attention to poetic patterns within speech. Overall, then, ethnopoetic methods and theories strive to capture on the written page the unique aesthetic elements of individual cultures’ oral poetry and narrative performance traditions, or what folklorists would call their verbal lore. Classicist Steve Reece has attempted to envision how folklorists like Dennis Tedlock or Elizabeth Fine, if transported to an eighth-century BCE social gathering in Ionia where Homer was performing a version of the Odyssey, would transcribe that oral performance into a textual form. This exercise is not entirely hypothetical: Homer’s Odyssey was, after all, written down at some point in history; otherwise it would not have survived.

== Bibliography ==
- Blommaert, Jan. 2007. “Applied Ethnopoetics.” Narrative–State of the Art. Edited by Michael G. W. Bamberg. Amsterdam: John Benjamins Publishing Company. Benjamins Current Topics Series (Number: 595215). 215–224.
- Quick, Catherine. 1999. "Ethnopoetics." Folklore Forum 30(1/2): 95–105.
- Santos, Marcel de Lima. The Ethnopoetics of Shamanism. New York: Palgrave MacMillan, 2014.
- Tedlock, Dennis. Syllabus. “English 699: Ethnopoetics.” Colleges of Arts and Sciences. University at Buffalo. Accessed 22 November 2011.
- Toelken, Barre. 2003. The Anguish of Snails. Vol. 2, Folklife of the West, edited by Barre Toelken and William A. Wilson. Logan: Utah State University Press.

=== Additional resources ===
- Hymes, Dell H. 1981. "In vain I tried to tell you": Essays in Native American ethnopoetics. Studies in Native American Literature 1. University of Pennsylvania publications in conduct and communication. Philadelphia: University of Pennsylvania Press. ISBN 0-8122-7806-2.
- Hymes, Dell H. 2003. Now I know only so far: Essays in ethnopoetics. Lincoln: University of Nebraska Press. ISBN 0-8032-2407-9 (hbk); ISBN 0-8032-7335-5 (pbk).
- Tedlock, Dennis. 1972. Finding the Center: Narrative Poetry of the Zuñi Indians. New York: Dial Press.
- Tedlock, Dennis. 1983. The spoken word and the work of interpretation. Philadelphia: University of Pennsylvania Press. ISBN 0-8122-7880-1.
- Tedlock, Dennis. 1999. Finding the Center: The Art of the Zuni Storyteller (Second Edition). Lincoln: University of Nebraska Press. ISBN 0-8032-4439-8.
