= Where Have All the Soldiers Gone? =

2008 book by James J. Sheehan

- Author: James J. Sheehan
- Language: English
- Genre: Politics, History
- Publication date: 2008
- Publication place: United States
- Pages: 304
- ISBN: 978-0547086330

Where Have All the Soldiers Gone?: The Transformation of Modern Europe, is a 2008 non-fiction book about the rise of national pacifism in post-World War II Europe by James J. Sheehan.
