= Margaret L. Anderson =

American historian

Margaret Lavinia Anderson
- Born: October 18, 1941 (age 83); Washington, D.C., U.S.
- Education: B.A., 1963, Swarthmore College; Ph.D., 1971, Brown University
- Occupation: Scholar
- Employers: Swarthmore College, Asst prof to prof, 1970–1990; University of California, Berkeley, assoc prof to prof, 1990–present
- Known for: Research on Germany between 1850–1925, history of Catholicism 1830–1918, history of elections, political parties, and parliaments, history of Germans in the Ottoman Empire
- Spouses: Mr. Raff; James J. Sheehan (m. 1989)
- Children: Sarah Elizabeth Raff
- Parent: David & Margaret Lavinia Anderson
- Website: history.berkeley.edu/people/margaret-lavinia-anderson

Margaret Lavinia Anderson is professor emerita at University of California Berkeley where she teaches about Europe since 1453; Central Europe from the late 18th century, especially modern Germany; World War I; Fascist Europe. She won a 2001 Berlin prize by the American Academy in Berlin, and was a 2008 Guggenheim Fellow. She was a fellow at Stanford Humanities Center.

== Life ==
Her research is about political culture, including electoral politics, in Imperial Germany and in comparative European perspective; the intersection of religion and politics; religion and society–especially Catholicism in the 19th century. She is now working on the relations (on the level of governments as well as civil society) between Germany and the Ottoman Empire from the time of the Hamidian massacres of the Ottoman Armenians in 1894-1896 to c. 1933. She was on the Academic Advisory Council of the German Historical Institute.

She completed her Ph.D. at Brown University and her B.A. at Swarthmore College.

She is married to James J. Sheehan, a historian at Stanford University.

== Selected works ==
- Windthorst: A Political Biography. Oxford University Press, 1981, ISBN 978-0-19-822578-2
- Windthorst: Zentrumspolitiker und Gegenspieler Bismarcks. Droste, 1988, ISBN 978-3-7700-0774-5
- Anderson, Margaret Lavinia (2000). Practicing Democracy: Elections and Political Culture in Imperial Germany. Princeton University Press. ISBN 978-0-691-04854-3.
- Review article "Piety and Politics: Recent Work on German Catholicism," The Journal of Modern History Vol. 63, No. 4, December 1991
- Anderson, Margaret Lavinia (1992). "History in the Comic Mode: Jonathan Sperber's 1848". Central European History. 25 (3): 333–342. doi:10.1017/S0008938900022147. S2CID 144729906.
- "Voter, Junker, Landrat, Priest: The Old Authorities and the new Franchise in Imperial Germany, 1871-1914," American Historical Review, Volume 98, Issue 5 (December 1993): pages 1448-1474
- "The Limits of Secularization: On the Problem of the Catholic Revival in 19th Century Germany," Historical Journal, 38, 3 (95): 647-670
- "Clerical Election Influence and Communal Solidarity: Catholic Political Culture in the German Empire, 1871-1914," Elections before Democracy. Essays on the Electoral History of Latin America and Europe, Macmillan (NY, New York and London, Eng), 96
- "'Down in Turkey, far away': Human Rights, the Armenian Massacres, and Orientalism in Wilhelmine Germany," The Journal of Modern History Vol. 79, No. 1, March 2007
- "The Divisions of the Pope: The Catholic Revival and Europe's Transition to Democracy," Rivals and Revivals: Religion and politics in Nineteenth-Century Spanish America and Europe, forthcoming.
