= Gerhard A. Ritter =

German historian (1929–2015)

Gerhard Albert Ritter (29 March 1929 – 20 June 2015) was a German historian.

== Biography ==
Ritter was born in and grew up in Berlin and studied from 1947 at the University of Tübingen and at the Free University of Berlin. He died in Berlin in 2015.

== Honors ==
- Honorary Fellow of St. Antony's College Oxford
- B. Lit. of Oxford University
- Honorary degree of University of Bielefeld
- Honorary degree of the Philosophischen Fakultät I of Humboldt-Universität zu Berlin (1999)
- Preis des Historischen Kollegs 2007
- Großes Bundesverdienstkreuz (2008)

== Work ==
- Der Sozialstaat. Entstehung und Entwicklung im internationalen Vergleich. Oldenbourg Verlag, München 1991, ISBN 978-3-486-54992-8
- Über Deutschland. Die Bundesrepublik in der deutschen Geschichte. C. H. Beck Verlag, München 1999, ISBN 3-406-45929-3
- Der Preis der Einheit. Die Wiedervereinigung und die Krise des Sozialstaats. C. H. Beck Verlag, München 2006, ISBN 3-406-54972-1
- Friedrich Meinecke: Akademischer Lehrer und emigrierte Schüler. Briefe und Aufzeichnungen. 1910–1977. Oldenbourg Verlag, München 2006, ISBN 3-486-57977-0 (= Biographische Quellen zur Zeitgeschichte. 23)
- Wir sind das Volk! Wir sind ein Volk! Geschichte der deutschen Einigung. C. H. Beck Verlag, München 2009, ISBN 978-3-406-59208-9.
