= Superdiversity =

Term and concept in social science

Superdiversity, or super-diversity, is a social science term and concept often said to have been coined by sociologist Steven Vertovec in a 2007 article in Ethnic and Racial Studies, but which he first used in a BBC article in 2005.

== Definition and usage ==
The term superdiversity is used to refer to some current levels of population diversity that are significantly higher than before. Vertovec argues superdiversity in Britain "is distinguished by a dynamic interplay of variables among an increased number of new, small and scattered, multiple-origin, transnationally connected, socio-economically differentiated and legally stratified immigrants who have arrived over the last decade". It denotes increased diversity not only between immigrant and ethnic minority groups, but also within them. It has also been called the "diversification of diversity". Vertovec gives the example of Somalis in the United Kingdom, arguing that the Somali community includes British citizens, refugees and asylum seekers, people granted exceptional leave to remain, undocumented migrants, and secondary migrants from other European states. Parveen Akhtar, a sociologist at the University of Bradford, argues that the UK is no longer characterized by diversity but by superdiversity: "Post-1945 you had large waves of immigration from fewer places in the world, largely from the former colonies. Now, since the 1980s, you’ve got smaller waves of immigration from a wider range of places".

According to Nasar Meer, "Super-diversity has emerged both as a description of empirical phenomena (the proliferation of diversities) and as a normative claim that increased pluralism (both associated with migration as well as wider changes in our understanding of identity categories) requires social scientists and policy makers to develop approaches to register this".

According to Fran Meissner and Steven Vertovec, writing in 2015, the concept of superdiversity has been the subject of "considerable attention" since Vertovec introduced it in 2005. They note that Vertovec's 2007 article in Ethnic and Racial Studies is the most cited article in the history of the journal. The concept has started to influence the fields of sociolinguistics and linguistic anthropology.

== Criticism ==
Some authors are critical of the concept of superdiversity. Sinfree B. Makoni argues that the concept "contains a powerful sense of social romanticism, creating an illusion of equality in a highly asymmetrical world, particularly in contexts characterized by a search for homogenization...I find it disconcerting, to say the least, to have an open celebration of diversity in societies marked by violent xenophobia, such as South Africa". Ana Deumert argues: "The use of 'superdiverse' as a descriptive adjective, is a theoretical cul-de-sac, because the complexities brought about by diversity in the social world ultimately defy numerical measurement". The claims of increased migrations and diversity have been challenged by Czajka and de Haas (2014). They observe that while globally the number of migrants has increased so has the world population so the proportion of migrants has actually decreased. In the Americas migration has increased but diversity has not. The fact that migrations have centered on a shrinking pool of prime destination countries" (many of them small countries in Western Europe) led them to conclude that "the idea that immigration has become more diverse may partly reveal a Eurocentric worldview". Aneta Pavlenko argues that superdiversity is an exercise in academic branding which fails as an academic term:

The uptake of the slippery slogan is not surprising. The aesthetic appeal of truthiness and the illusion of novelty, contemporaneity and relevance undoubtedly explain some of the attraction yet we cannot ignore the fact that the advent of superdiversity provided scholars of multilingualism with a new means to move up the academic ladder, distinguish their publications, and fund their work.

== Researchers and research institutes ==
Key researchers working on superdiversity include Vertovec, Jan Blommaert and Jenny Phillimore. The University of Birmingham established the Institute for Research into Superdiversity in 2013. The Max Planck Institute for the Study of Religious and Ethnic Diversity in Göttingen is also an important centre for superdiversity research.

New Zealand's "Superdiversity Stocktake: Impact on Business, Government and on New Zealand" was launched in November 2015 and sponsored by banks, companies, the Human Rights Commission, and the Ministry of Education. A study on "Implications of Superdiversity for NZ's Electoral Laws and Democracy" was also launched. Both projects were carried out by the Superdiversity Centre for Law, Policy and Business, which describes itself as "a multidisciplinary centre specialising in analysing the law, policy and business implications of New Zealand's superdiversity". Its patron is Sir Anand Satyanand and its chair is Mai Chen.

== See also ==
- Cultural diversity
- Multiculturalism

== General references ==
- Karel Arnaut; Martha Sif Karrebæk; Massimiliano Spotti; Jan Blommaert (24 November 2016). Engaging Superdiversity: Recombining Spaces, Times and Language Practices. Channel View Publications. pp. 1979–. ISBN 978-1-78309-681-7.
- Budach, Gabriele; Saint-Georges, Ingrid de (2017). Superdiversity and language. Routledge Handbooks Online. p. Chapter 3. doi:10.4324/9781315754512. ISBN 9781138801981.
