= Steven Vertovec =

American social scientist (born 1957)

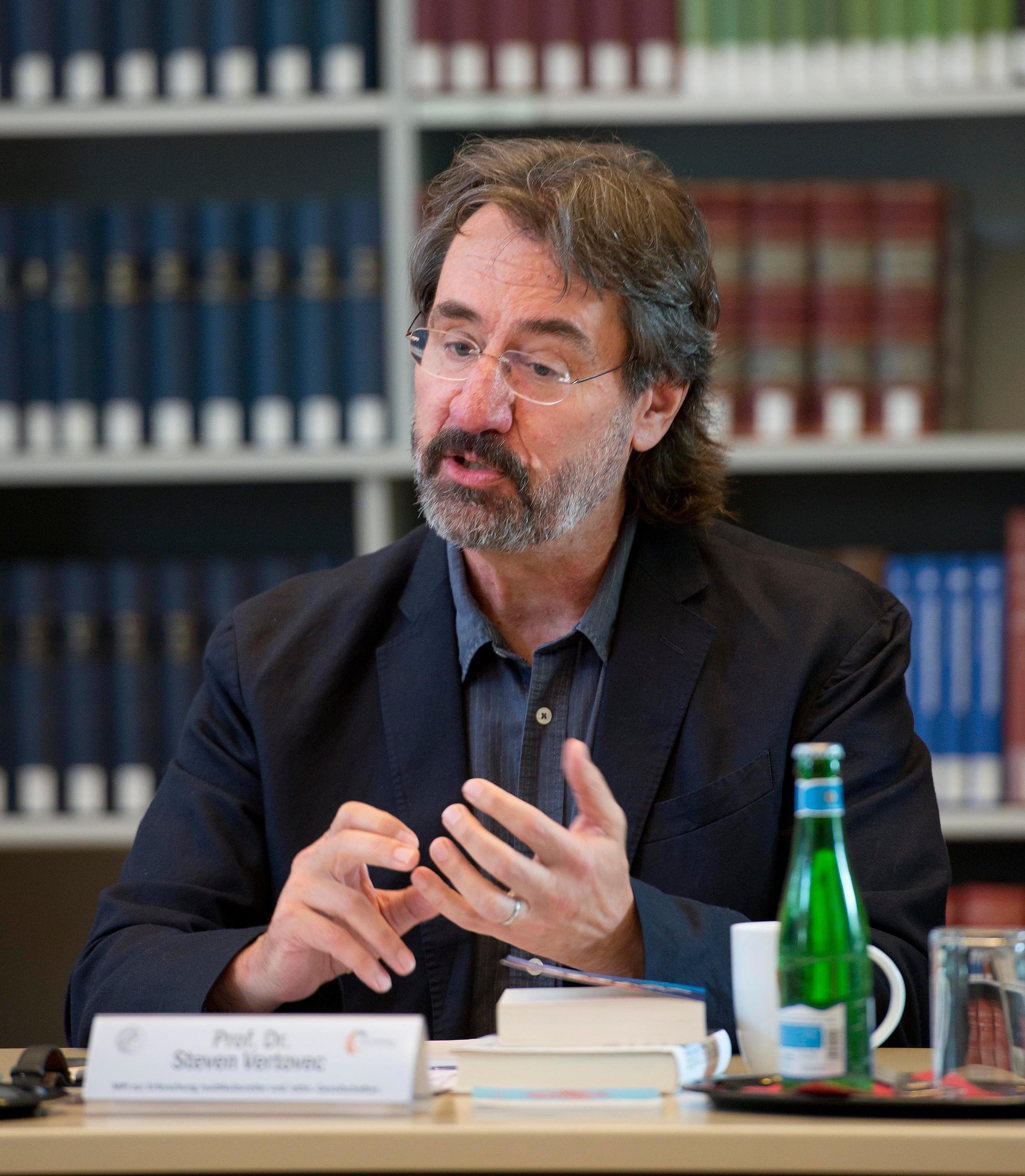
- Born: 2 July 1957; Chicago, United States
- Citizenship: US, British and German
- Education: University of Colorado, University of California, Santa Barbara, Oxford University
- Known for: Superdiversity, Backlash against Multiculturalism, The Urban Context: Ethnicity, Social Networks, and Situational Analysis
- Scientific career
- Fields: Anthropology, Diversity Studies, Transnationalism, Diaspora Studies, Ethnic and Racial Studies
- Workplaces: Max Planck Institute for the Study of Religious and Ethnic Diversity
- Website: www.mmg.mpg.de

Steven Vertovec (born 2 July 1957) is an anthropologist and Director of the Max Planck Institute for Political and Social Science (formerly the Max Planck Institute for the Study of Religious and Ethnic Diversity, based in Göttingen, Germany. He is also currently Honorary Joint Professor of Sociology and Ethnology at the Georg August University of Göttingen and Emeritus Fellow at Linacre College, Oxford.

== Career ==
Born in Chicago, Vertovec completed a double major (Anthropology and Religious Studies) B.A. Magna cum laude at the University of Colorado, Boulder in 1979. Thereafter, he gained an M.A. in Religious Studies at the University of California, Santa Barbara in 1982. In 1988 he was awarded a D.Phil. in Social Anthropology at the University of Oxford, where he was a student at Nuffield College. In 2018, Vertovec was awarded an Honorary Doctorate at the Université de Liège.

Vertovec's doctoral work concerned religion, ethnicity and socio-economic development in Trinidad, West Indies. Since then, his work has examined issues surrounding ethnic and religious minorities, international migration, multiculturalism, cosmopolitanism, diasporas, transnationalism, diversity and super-diversity. He has mainly conducted research in Britain and Germany.

He has been awarded a scholarship from Nuffield College, Oxford and fellowships from the University of California, Alexander von Humboldt Foundation, British Economic and Social Research Council and the Wissenschaftskolleg (Institute for Advanced Study), Berlin. Vertovec has gained grants from among others, the Leverhulme Trust, UNESCO, Volkswagen Foundation, European Commission, Macarthur Foundation, Economic and Social Research Council (UK), Deutsche Forschungs Gemeinschaft, and an Advanced Investigator Award from the European Research Council.

Vertovec has held numerous positions, including: Postdoctoral Fellow (under an award from the Leverhulme Trust) in the School of Geography at the University of Oxford; Principal Research Fellow at the ESRC Centre for Research on Ethnic Relations, University of Warwick; Professor of Transnational Anthropology at the Institute of Social and Cultural Anthropology, University of Oxford; and Senior Research Fellow at Linacre College, Oxford. He has been Distinguished Visiting Professor at Monash University and Visiting Professor at the Erasmus University Rotterdam.

He has managed several large-scale research initiatives, including: Director of 'Multicultural Policies and Modes of Citizenship in European Cities' within UNESCO's MOST programme; Director of the ESRC national research programme on 'Transnational Communities'; and Founding Director of the ESRC Centre on Migration, Policy and Society (COMPAS). Vertovec has acted as expert or consultant for numerous agencies, including the German Expert Council on Migration and Integration, the UK government's Cabinet Office, National Audit Office, Home Office, Department for International Development, Department of Communities and Local Government, the British Council, the European Commission, the G8, World Bank and UNESCO.

After coining the term super-diversity different major news outlets have reported on Vertovec's research and Vertovec himself has actively contributed to debates on immigration and thinking about social complexities

In 2026, Vertovec launched Futures of Difference, a scholarly platform by the Max Planck Institute for the Study of Religious and Ethnic Diversity. The platform features essays by international scholars, a video podcast series co-hosted with journalist Georg Diez, webinars with a range of scholars from the Global South, expert interviews and an event film. The podcast series features conversations with Michele Lamont (Harvard), Dan Hiebert (UBC), Junjia Ye (NTU Singapore), Miri Song (University of Kent / LSE), and Ann Phoenix (UCL), exploring how social categories including race, ethnicity, gender, and migration status are being transformed by demographic, technological, and political shifts worldwide. The platform is published at futuresofdifference.net, on Substack, and YouTube.

== Selected publications ==
- Clarke, Colin, Ceri Peach and Steven Vertovec, eds. [1990] South Asians Overseas: Migration and Ethnicity, Cambridge: Cambridge University Press, ISBN 978-0-521-12965-7.
- Vertovec S. [1992] Hindu Trinidad: Religion, Ethnicity and Socio-Economic Change, Basingstoke: Macmillan ISBN 978-0-333-53505-9.
- Vertovec, Steven [1996] 'Multiculturalism, culturalism, and public incorporation,' Ethnic and Racial Studies 19(1): 49-69 doi:10.1080/01419870.1996.9993898
- Vertovec, Steven and Robin Cohen, eds [1999] Migration, Diasporas and Transnationalism, Aldershot: Edward Elgar ISBN 978-1-85898-869-6.
- Vertovec, Steven [1999] 'Conceiving and researching transnationalism,' Ethnic and Racial Studies 22 (2): 447-62 doi:10.1080/014198799329558
- Vertovec, Steven [2000] The Hindu Diaspora: Comparative Patterns, London and New York: Routledge ISBN 978-0-415-23893-9.
- Vertovec, Steven and Robin Cohen, eds [2002] Conceiving Cosmopolitanism: Theory, Context and Practice, Oxford: Oxford University Press ISBN 978-0-19-925228-2.
- Vertovec, Steven [2004] 'Migrant transnationalism and modes of transformation,' International Migration Review 38(3): 970-1001 doi:10.1111/j.1747-7379.2004.tb00226.x
- Vertovec, Steven [2007] 'Super-diversity and its implications', Ethnic and Racial Studies 29(6): 1024-54: doi:10.1080/01419870701599465
- Vertovec, Steven [2009] Transnationalism, London & New York: Routledge: ISBN 978-0-415-43299-3.
- Vertovec, Steven, Ed. [2009] Anthropology of Migration and Multiculturalism: New Directions, London: Routledge ISBN 978-0-415-50882-7.
- Vertovec, Steven and Susanne Wessendorf, eds [2010] The Multicultural Backlash: European Discourses, Policies and Practices, London Routledge ISBN 978-0-415-55649-1.
- Vertovec, Steven, Ed. [2014] Migration and Diversity, Cheltanham: Edward Elgar: ISBN 978-1-78254-718-1.
- Vertovec, Steven, Ed. [2015] Routledge International Handbook of Diversity Studies, London and New York: Routledge ISBN 978-1-315-74722-4.
- Meissner, Fran and Steven Vertovec [2015] 'Comparing super-diversity,' Ethnic and Racial Studies 38(4): 541-55 doi:10.1080/01419870.2015.980295
- Vertovec, Steven, Ed. [2015] Diversities Old and New: Migration and Socio-spatial Patterns in New York, Singapore and Johannesburg, Basingstoke: Palgrave Macmillan ISBN 978-1-137-49548-8.
- Vertovec, S. (2019). Talking around super-diversity. Ethnic and Racial Studies, 42(1), 125–139. doi:10.1080/01419870.2017.1406128
- Vertovec, S. (2021). The social organization of difference. Ethnic and Racial Studies. doi:10.1080/01419870.2021.1884733
- Meissner, F., Signa, N., & Vertovec, S. (Eds.). (2022). The Oxford Handbook of Superdiversity. Oxford: Oxford University Press. ISBN 978-0-19-754493-8
- Vertovec, S. (2023). Superdiversity: migration and social complexity. London: Routledge. ISBN 978-0-415-83463-6
