= James J. Sheehan =

American historian (born 1937)

Jim Sheehan
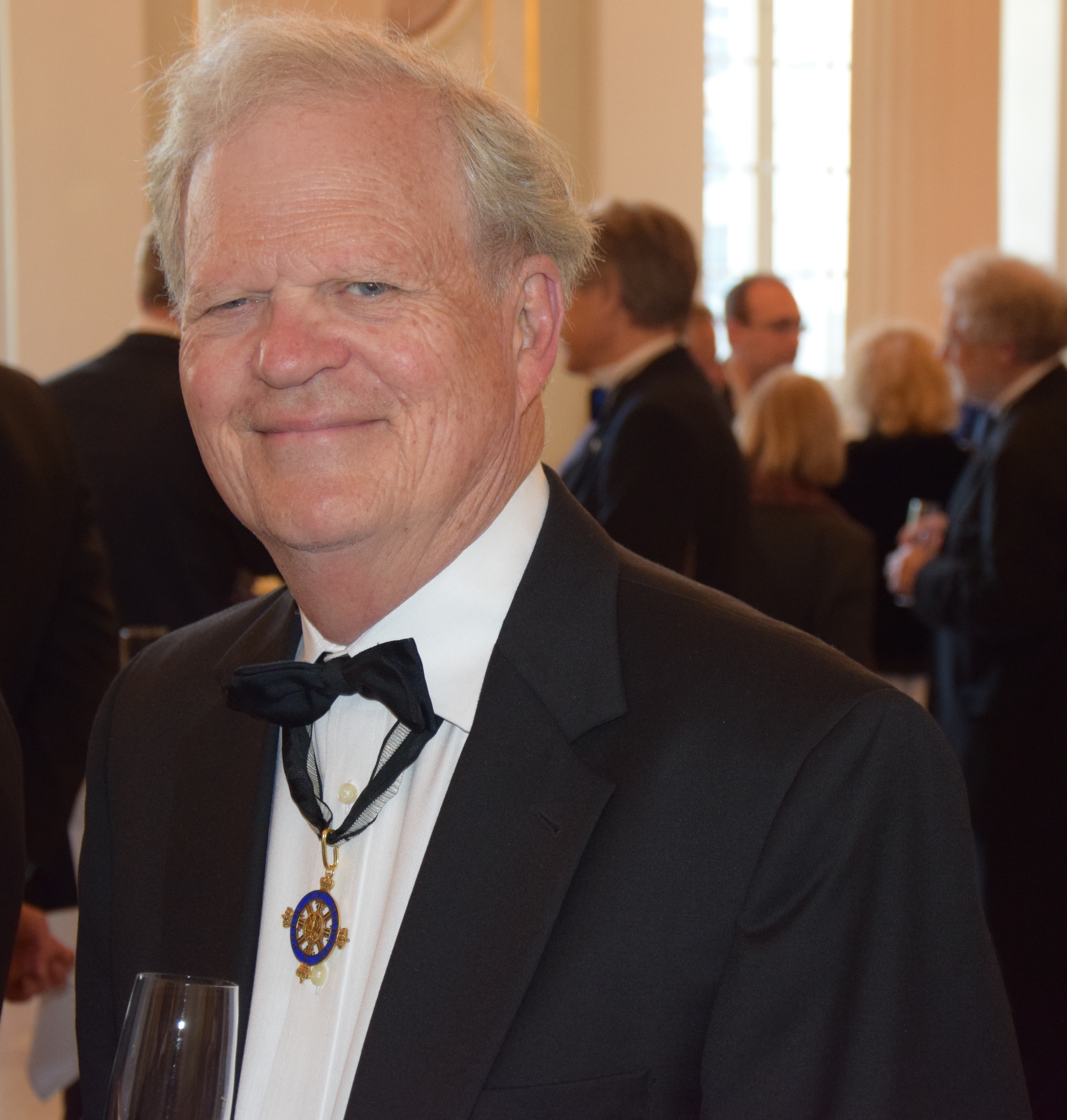
- Sheehan in 2014
- Born: 1937 (age 88–89); San Francisco, California, United States
- Education: Stanford University (BA); University of California (PhD)
- Spouse: Margaret Anderson (m. 1989)
- Awards: Pour le Mérite

James J. Sheehan (born 1937) is an American historian. His scholarship has focused on the history of modern Germany, and he is a former president of the American Historical Association (2005).

== Biography ==
Born in San Francisco in 1937, Sheehan earned a BA from Stanford University in 1958 and a PhD in history from the University of California, Berkeley in 1964. He taught at Northwestern University between 1964 and 1979, then moved back to Stanford to succeed Gordon A. Craig as Stanford's historian of modern Germany. At Stanford, Sheehan is Dickason Professor in the Humanities, Professor of History, and FSI senior fellow (courtesy).

Sheehan's research focuses on German and modern European history, especially the history of German liberalism, the German Empire, and war and the modern European state. He is the author of numerous articles and several important books, including The Career of Lujo Brentano: A Study of Liberalism and Social Reform in Imperial Germany (Chicago and London: University of Chicago Press, 1966); German Liberalism in the Nineteenth Century (Chicago and London: University of Chicago Press, 1978); German History, 1770–1866 (Oxford: Oxford University Press, 1989); and, most recently, Where Have All the Soldiers Gone? The Transformation of Modern Europe (Boston: Houghton Mifflin, 2008). He also co-edited volumes on German émigrė historians.

Sheehan is a recipient of the Humboldt Research Prize and the Cross of Merit of the Federal Republic of Germany, as well as a member of the German Order Pour le Mérite. He was a Guggenheim Fellow (2000–2001), a Berlin Prize Fellow of the American Academy in Berlin (2001), and has been a member of the American Philosophical Society since 2001.

Sheehan is married to Margaret Anderson, a historian at the University of California, Berkeley.
