= Peter van der Veer =

Dutch academic

Peter van der Veer is a Dutch academic who is the Director at the Max Planck Institute for the Study of Religious and Ethnic Diversity in Göttingen in Germany. He has taught anthropology at the Free University of Amsterdam, Utrecht University and the University of Pennsylvania. Van der Veer works on religion and nationalism in Asia and Europe.

Van der Veer published a monograph on the comparative study of religion and nationalism in India and China, entitled The Modern Spirit of Asia. The Spiritual and the Secular in China and India (Princeton University Press, 2013) Among his other major publications are Gods on Earth (LSE Monographs, 1988), Religious Nationalism (University of California Press, 1994), and Imperial Encounters (Princeton University Press, 2001).

== Life and career ==
In 1992 he was appointed Professor of Comparative Religion and Founding Director of the Research Center in Religion and Society in the Social Science Faculty of the University of Amsterdam. He served as Dean of the Social Science Faculty and the Amsterdam School for Social Science Research at Amsterdam, as well as Director of the International Institute for the Study of Islam, and was Chairman of the Board of the International Institute for Asian Studies, both in Leiden. In 1994 he was appointed University Professor at Large at Utrecht University, a position he continues to hold. He has held visiting positions at the London School of Economics, the University of Chicago, University of Michigan, Ecole des Hautes Etudes en Sciences Sociales in Paris, Institute for Advanced Study in Princeton, New School in New York, and National University of Singapore.

Van der Veer received the Hendrik Muller Award for his social science study of religion. He is an elected Fellow of the Royal Netherlands Academy of Arts and Sciences and a member of several advisory boards, including The Prayer Project of the Social Science Research Council in New York.

Van der Veer was editor or co-editor of Orientalism and Post-Colonial Predicament(University of Pennsylvania Press, 1993), Nation and Migration (University of Pennsylvania Press, 1995), Conversion to Modernities (Routledge, 1997), Nation and Religion (Princeton University Press, 1999), Media, War, and Terrorism (Routledge-Curzon, 2003), Patterns of Middle-Class Consumption in India and China (Sage 2007). Most recently he edited the Handbook of Religion and the Asian City. Aspiration and Urbanization in the Twenty-First Century (University of California Press).

Van der Veer serves on the Advisory Board of China in Comparative Perspective, Political Theology, and the Journal of Religious and Political Practice. He has just started a new journal: Cultural Diversity in China.

== Representative publications ==
- Prayer and Politics. Abingdon: Routledge 2017.
- The Value of Comparison. Durham: Duke University Press 2016 .
- The Modern Spirit of Asia: The Secular and the Spiritual in India and China, Princeton: Princeton University Press (also Chinese translation forthcoming 2014.
- Islam en het "beschaafde" Westen. Amsterdam, Netherlands: Meulenhoff, 2002.
- Imperial Encounters: Religion and Modernity in India and Britain. Princeton, NJ: Princeton University Press, 2001.
- Religious Nationalism: Hindus and Muslims in India. University of California Press, 1994.
- Gods on Earth: Religious Experience and Identity in Ayodhya. Oxford University Press, 1989.

Edited works

- The Handbook of Religion and the Asian City. Aspiration and Urbanization in the Twenty-First Century. Oakland: University of California Press 2016.
- Religious Networks in Asia and Beyond. Book Issue Encounters.London: I.B. Tauris and New York: MacMillan.
- Patterns of Middle Class Consumption in India and China (with Christophe Jaffrelot). New Delhi: Sage.
- Media, War and Terrorism: Responses from the Middle East and Asia (with Shoma Munshi). London and New York: Routledge, 2004.
- Nation and Religion: Perspectives on Europe and Asia (with Hartmut Lehmann). Princeton University Press, 1999.
- Conversion to Modernities. The Globalization of Christianity. New York: Routledge 1996 .
- Nation and Migration: The Politics of Space in the South Asian Diaspora, 1995.
- (edited with Carol Breckenridge) Orientalism and the Post-Colonial Predicament. Perspectives on Orientalism and South Asia. Philadelphia: University of Pennsylvania Press 1993.
