= Max Planck Institute for the Study of Religious and Ethnic Diversity =

German research institute

Coordinates: 51°32′27″N 9°56′48″E

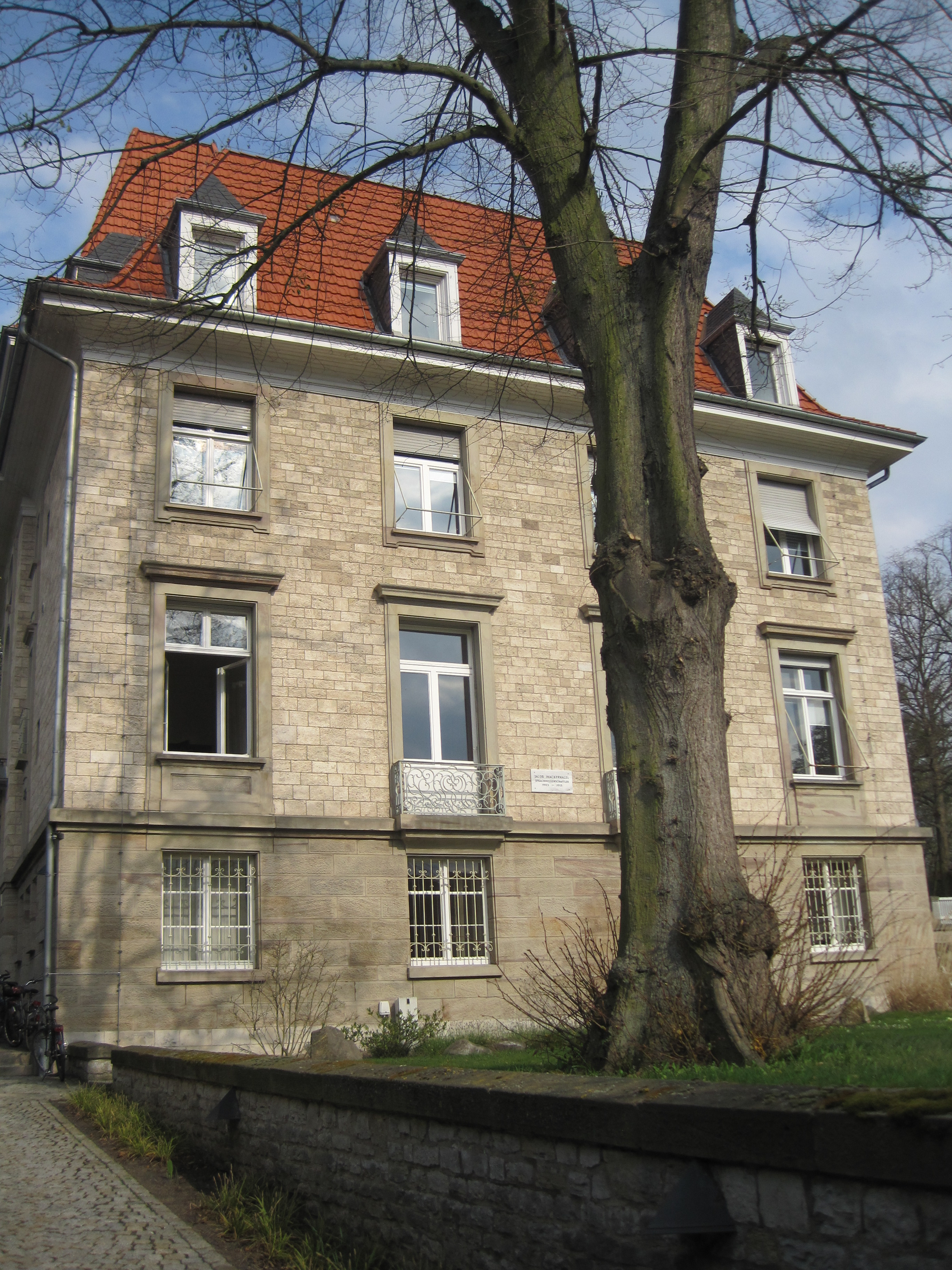
- Institute building in Göttingen
- Abbreviation: MPI-MMG
- Predecessor: Kaiser Wilhelm Institute for German History (1917); Max Planck Institute for History (1956)
- Formation: 2007; 19 years ago
- Type: Scientific institute
- Purpose: Multi-disciplinary study of diversity in contemporary and historical perspectives
- Headquarters: Göttingen, Lower Saxony, Germany
- Parent organization: Max Planck Society
- Website: (in English)

The Max Planck Institute for Political and Social Science (German: Max-Planck-Institut für Politik- und Sozialwissenschaften) is located in Göttingen, Germany. It is one of 83 institutes in the Max Planck Society (Max-Planck-Gesellschaft).

== History ==
The MPI for the Study of Religious and Ethnic Diversity is the successor of the Kaiser Wilhelm Institute for German History, established in 1917 in Berlin. Founded in 1956 as the Max Planck Institute for History (German: Max-Planck-Institut für Geschichte), the institute was renamed following a decision of the Senate of the Max Planck Society in March 2007.

== Research ==
The Max Planck Institute for the Study of Religious and Ethnic Diversity conducts multidisciplinary research on diversity, in its multiple forms, in a globalizing world. Its research addresses questions such as the relationship between mobility and inequality; the interaction of globalization, religious diversity, and the secular state; the legal boundaries of cultural accommodation; global cities and super-diversity within them; new forms of membership and belonging; and the trans-bordering networking of ethnic and religious minorities. Researchers at the Institute approach these topics from a variety of disciplinary perspectives, including anthropology, sociology, political science, and law.

== Departments ==
=== Ethics, Law and Politics ===
The department, led by Ayelet Shachar, focuses on questions of citizenship, identity, and mobility. Its research cuts across traditional disciplinary lines and places special emphasis on three interrelated themes: the relationship between diversity and equality in public law and private dispute resolution; the legal construction of borders and membership boundaries; and the intersection of states and markets in defining "who belongs" within the political community, according to what criteria, and with what implications for new disparities of mobility and opportunity amid migration and globalization pressures. The department focuses on theoretical and legal questions and encourages comparative approaches and international collaboration.

=== Religious Diversity ===
The department, led by Peter van der Veer, has a research program developed within the ideographic tradition of anthropology and religious studies, which allows for a variety of individual projects addressing questions that are not predetermined by theoretical models but developed in ethnographic or micro-sociological fieldwork. The department has a regional focus on South, South-East and East Asia, chosen because of the region's share of the world's population and on the assumption that comparisons can be made across the region. This is because common civilizational histories, as well as common histories of imperialism and cold war politics, have transformed the religious traditions of Hinduism, Buddhism, Confucianism, Daoism, Islam and Christianity into "modern religions" in the Western sense. From the start, the department has sought to establish collaborations with research institutions and researchers in the societies in which fieldwork projects are carried out.

=== Socio-Cultural Diversity ===
The department, led by Steven Vertovec, is devoted to comparative empirical investigation and theoretical development concerning various modes and manifestations of migration-driven diversity and superdiversity. The categories of diversity most relevant to its research are race and ethnicity, religion, gender, class, migration channel and migration status. The department also examines the ways and processes by which patterns of migration-driven diversity are related to other modes of increasing social, cultural, economic and political differentiation.
